= When You Finish Saving the World (soundtrack) =

Film score by Emile Mosseri
- Released: January 20, 2023
- Recorded: 2022
- Genre: Film score
- Length: 26:04
- Label: A24 Music
- Producer: Emile Mosseri

Emile Mosseri chronology
Stutz (2022)	When You Finish Saving the World (2022)

Singles from When You Finish Saving the World (Original Soundtrack)
- 1. "Pieces of Gold" Released: January 11, 2023

When You Finish Saving the World is the soundtrack to the 2023 film of the same name directed by Jesse Eisenberg based on his own audio drama. The film's soundtrack consisted of a score written and produced by Emile Mosseri, and two songs performed by the lead actor Finn Wolfhard as Ziggy Katz (the character he played in the film). The soundtrack was released by A24 Music on January 20, 2023.

== Background ==
Emile Mosseri composed the film's musical score; it marked Mosseri's second collaboration with A24 after Minari (2020) and first with Eisenberg. Eisenberg eventually wrote songs for the audio drama during its development, after he sketched Ziggy's character to be musician over an internet influencer and made Wolfhard actually sing those tracks. He wanted the songs to be simultaneously immature and skilled, raw but well produced, young but not stupid".

The first thought he had on developing the film's score, was the music being an extension of Ziggy's world. He met Mosseri and explained those concepts, and Mosseri eventually sent samples of "homemade" sounds and eventually used the riffs from the Casio CZ synthesizers that is featured throughout the film. He described Mosseri's score as "unusually deceptive" as it played like traditional film score while also seeming like Ziggy's music.

For the song "Pieces of Gold", both Eisenberg and Mosseri asked Wolfhard to sing it over and use specific instruments to improvise them, to which Wolfhard described it as "cool". Wolfhard's contribution, added a level of the authenticity to the film's music as he would contribute it while playing Ziggy and also felt comfortable owing to his music career.

== Release ==
On January 11, 2023, the song "Pieces of Gold" was released as a digital single which led the soundtrack. It was performed by Wolfhard under the film's character, Ziggy Katz. The album was released through A24 Music on January 20. The album was further issued in vinyl editions with the 11-song album being pressed into a 180-gram black and fluorescent, yellow-colored LP disc and accompanied with a cover sleeve with an artwork consisting of sketches and drawings. The disc also featured pictures of Wolfhard and Julianne Moore in the background.

== Reception ==
Ross Bonaime of Collider called the score as haunting, and sounded like it would have been made by the fictional protagonist. Benjamin Lee of The Guardian opined that Mosseri's score does the heavy lifting. Robert Abele of Los Angeles Times attributed that it "fills the non-diegetic holes between Ziggy's songs and Evelyn's calming classical with wheezing electronic-sounding motifs". Siddhant Adlakha of IGN wrote "Composer Emile Mosseri draws from Ziggy's electronic instruments to create a springy, head-in-the-clouds atmosphere". Courtney Lanning of News Center Maine described that the score "masterfully compliments the film". A critic based at the Arkansas Democrat-Gazette called the score "wonderful" and commented "Every piece of music included in this film was right on target in terms of theme and tone."

== Track listing ==
When You Finish Saving the World track listing
No.	Title	Performer	Length
1.	"One of the Good Ones"	Emile Mosseri	1:44
2.	"Mouth of a Liar"	Mosseri	1:54
3.	"Pieces of Gold"	Finn Wolfhard (as Ziggy Katz)	4:01
4.	"Blue Pieces"	Mosseri	1:42
5.	"Cardiac"	Mosseri	1:49
6.	"I Made a Duck"	Mosseri	1:41
7.	"Lila's Poem"	Wolfhard (as Ziggy Katz)	2:13
8.	"We Ate With Our Hands"	Mosseri	1:31
9.	"Evelyn Katz's Son"	Mosseri	3:44
10.	"These Things Are Separate"	Mosseri	2:13
11.	"Naturally Bright"	Mosseri	1:20
12.	"Union Made"	Jeff Tweedy	2:12
Total length:			26:04

== Release history ==
Release dates and formats for When You Finish Saving the World (Original Soundtrack)
Region	Date	Format(s)	Label	Ref.
Various	January 20, 2023	Digital download; streaming	A24	
Various	May 12, 2023	vinyl	A24	
