= Gabriel LaBelle =

Canadian actor (born 2002)

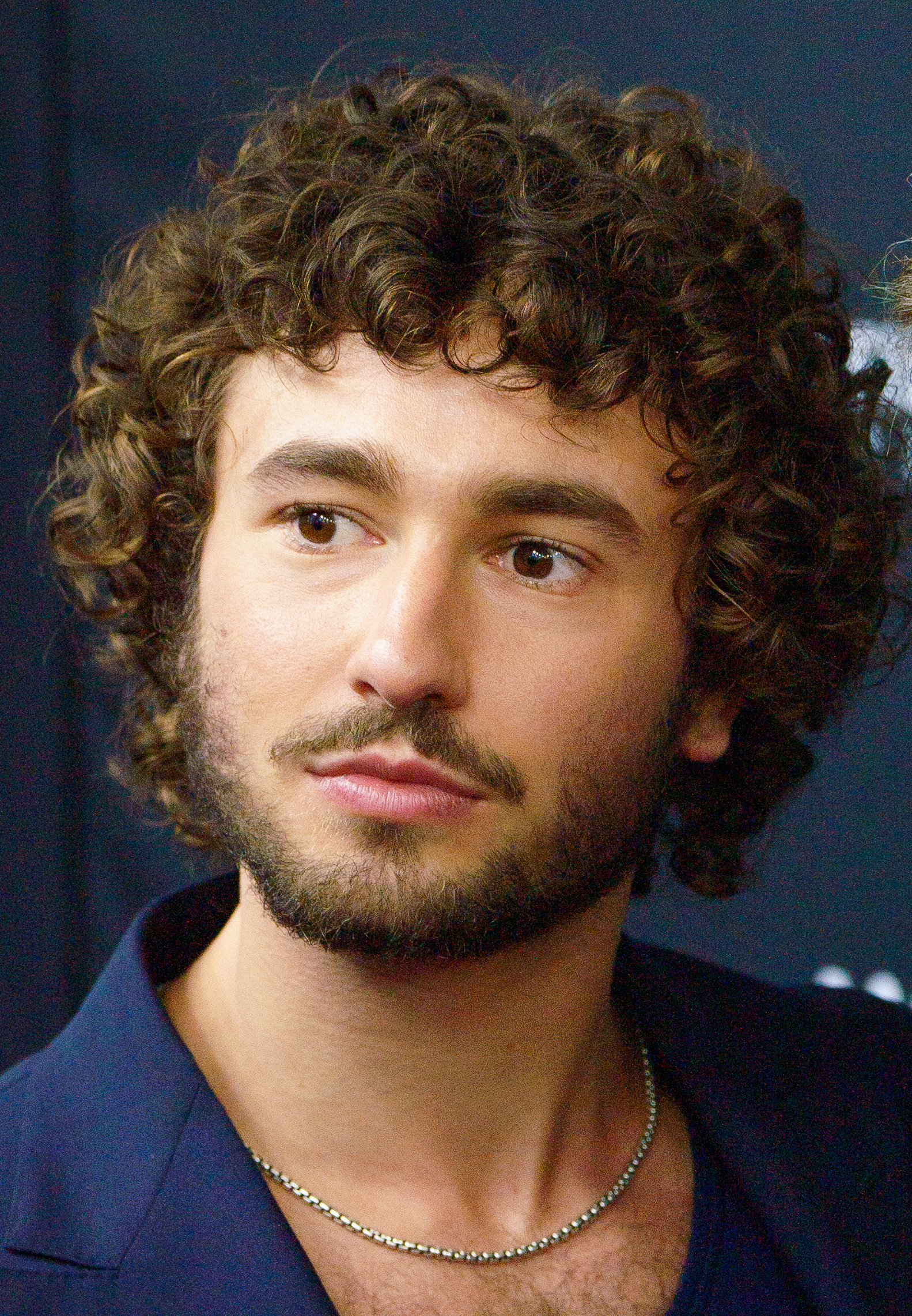
- LaBelle at the 2024 Toronto International Film Festival
- Born: September 2002 (age 24); Vancouver, British Columbia, Canada
- Education: Concordia University
- Occupation: Actor
- Years active: 2013–present
- Parent: Rob LaBelle (father)

Gabriel LaBelle (born September 2002) is a Canadian actor. He is best known for his leading role as young aspiring filmmaker Sammy Fabelman in Steven Spielberg's semi-autobiographical film The Fabelmans (2022), for which he received acclaim and won the Critics' Choice Movie Award for Best Young Performer.

LaBelle has also appeared in the action film The Predator (2018) and in the Showtime drama series American Gigolo (2022). In 2024, he starred as producer Lorne Michaels in the biographical film Saturday Night, for which he received a nomination for a Golden Globe Award for Best Actor in a Motion Picture – Musical or Comedy.

== Early life and education ==
LaBelle was born in Vancouver, and is the son of hair stylist Megan LaBelle and producer and character actor Rob LaBelle and younger brother to Angus Labelle. He was raised Jewish.

LaBelle began interest in acting at the age of 8 at a summer camp, playing roles in its musical productions of Footloose, Shrek the Musical and Aladdin. LaBelle made his on-screen acting debut in 2013 on an episode of the Canadian TV series Motive in a guest role, thanks to his father landing his son an agent and being a producer on the show. In 2017, he starred in the indie horror film Dead Shack, which premiered at the Vancouver International Film Festival and Fantasia Film Festival.

It was in 2020 that LaBelle became fully committed to acting as a career and flew to Montreal to apply for theatre programs, until the COVID-19 pandemic locked down the city. He ultimately got in to Concordia University's drama program, but had to attend classes virtually. He also wanted to pursue a career in acting in New York City, but put the plans on hold to take care of his family at home. He also deleted his social media in early 2020, saying that it made him "a better actor because you want to be focused, creative and confident" without seeking online validation.

== Career ==
=== 2021–2022: Breakthrough with The Fabelmans ===
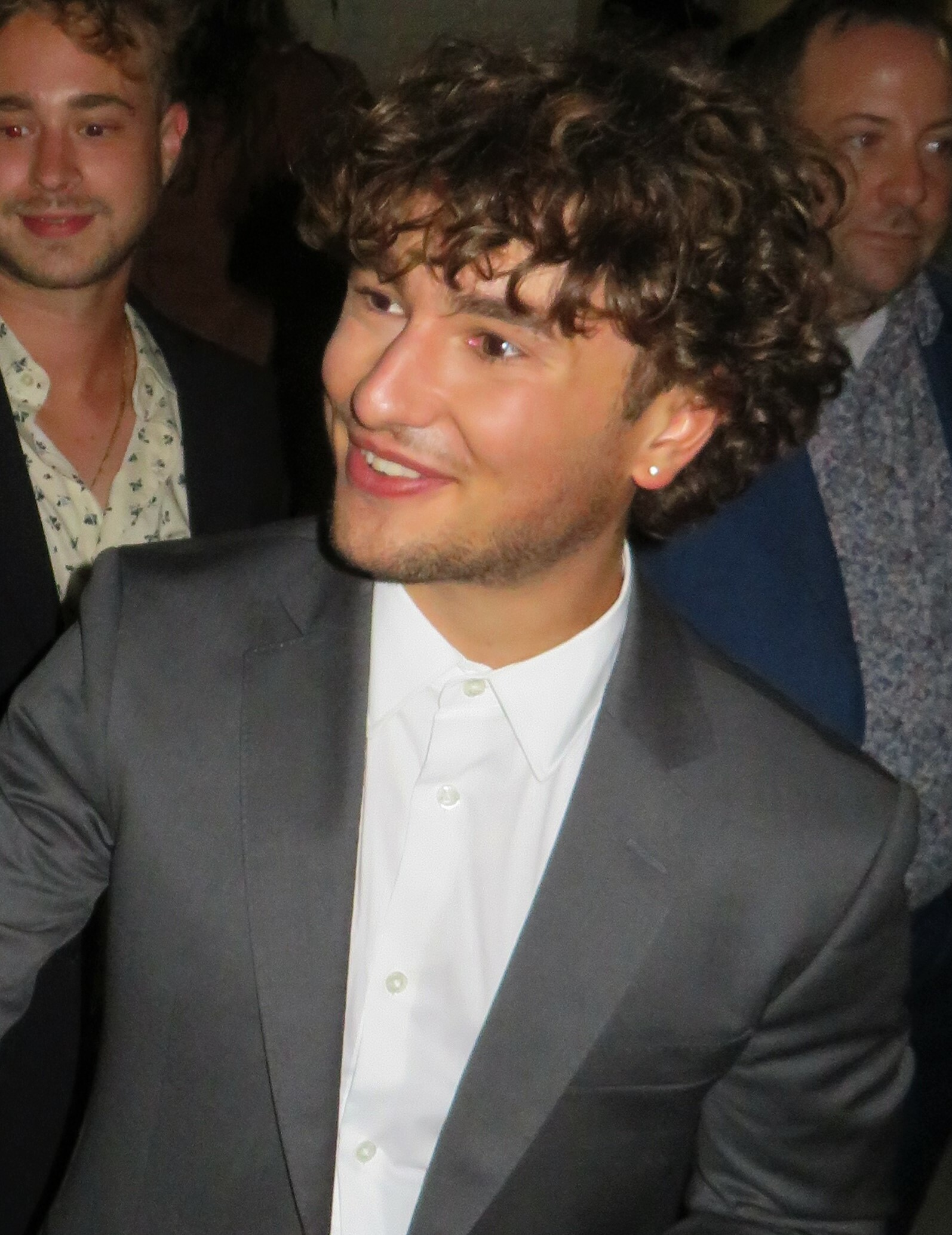
LaBelle at the premiere of The Fabelmans in 2022

In March 2021, LaBelle received from casting director Cindy Tolan the offer to audition, among 2,000 other contenders, for the lead role of Sammy Fabelman in Steven Spielberg's The Fabelmans, which at the time had kept its title, plot and character names under wraps. Following his audition, he was initially not cast in the role until he received a virtual callback three months later, with Spielberg, Tolan and 38 other representatives in attendance, where he then won the part. To prepare for the role, LaBelle watched and re-watched some of Spielberg's films, such as Empire of the Sun (1987) and gained access to photographs, home movies and other material from Spielberg's family's archives. He was also taught how to use the 8mm and 16mm camera props that were used on set, which had real film inside of them, as well as how to cut and splice film stock using the editing machines and film projectors of the time period. He also got to keep the 8mm camera Sammy used to film the family camping trip and Escape to Nowhere short film as a souvenir after the completion of principal photography.

The Fabelmans premiered at the 2022 Toronto International Film Festival, where LaBelle's performance received critical acclaim and he was recognized as a 2022 TIFF Rising Star, and won the award for Best Young Performer at the 28th Critics' Choice Awards and the award for Breakthrough Performance from the National Board of Review (the latter for which he shared with Danielle Deadwyler for Till). The ensemble cast of the film was nominated for the Screen Actors Guild Award for Outstanding Performance by a Cast in a Motion Picture.

=== 2022–present ===
After completion of filming on The Fabelmans, LaBelle moved to Los Angeles to pursue more film, television and theatre projects as an actor, with intentions to also direct at some point. In 2022, LaBelle joined the cast of the Showtime series adaptation of American Gigolo, in the role of the young version of Julian Kaye, played by Jon Bernthal.

In 2024, LaBelle played one of the lead roles in Adam Carter Rehmeier's coming-of-age comedy Snack Shack, which was delayed by the 2023 Hollywood labour disputes. LaBelle was cast as Saturday Night Live producer Lorne Michaels in Jason Reitman's movie Saturday Night, which accounts the behind-the-scenes story of the NBC late-night show's opening night. It premiered at the 51st Telluride Film Festival in August 2024. His performance earned him a nomination for the Golden Globe Award for Best Actor in a Motion Picture – Musical or Comedy.

LaBelle will next star in the romantic crime drama Dutch & Razzlekhan, based on the 2016 Bitfinex hack.

In 2025, LaBelle and Millie Bobby Brown are to star in a Netflix romantic comedy film Just Picture It. In November 2025, it was announced that LaBelle would star in and executive produce a film titled Crash Land alongside Finn Wolfhard, with Dempsey Bryk directing.

== Filmography ==
=== Film ===
| Year | Title | Role | Notes | Ref |
|---|---|---|---|---|
| 2017 | Max 2: White House Hero | Alfred | Credited as Gabe LaBelle | |
| 2017 | Dead Shack | Colin | | |
| 2018 | The Predator | EJ | | |
| 2022 | The Fabelmans | Sammy Fabelman | | |
| 2024 | Snack Shack | Moose | | |
| 2024 | Saturday Night | Lorne Michaels | | |
| 2026 | Crash Land | Lance | Also executive producer | |
| 2027 | Just Picture It | Sam | Post-production | |
| 2027 | Not Safe for Life | | Post-production | |

=== Television ===
| Year | Title | Role | Notes |
|---|---|---|---|
| 2013 | Motive | Chad Chase | Episode: "Detour" |
| 2015 | iZombie | Charlie | Episode: "Love & Basketball"; credited as Gabe LaBelle |
| 2021 | Brand New Cherry Flavor | Tim Nathans | Episode: "Jennifer" |
| 2022 | American Gigolo | Young Julian Kaye | Main cast |
| 2025 | Chad Powers | Tyler | Episode: "1st Quarter" |

== Awards and nominations ==
List of Gabriel LaBelle awards and nominations
| Year | Award | Category | Work | Result | Ref |
|---|---|---|---|---|---|
| 2022 | Atlanta Film Critics Circle | Best Breakthrough Performer | The Fabelmans | Nominated | |
| 2022 | Las Vegas Film Critics Society | Best Actor | The Fabelmans | Nominated | |
| 2022 | Las Vegas Film Critics Society | Best Male Youth Performance | The Fabelmans | Won | |
| 2022 | National Board of Review | Breakthrough Performance | The Fabelmans | Won | |
| 2022 | North Texas Film Critics Association | Best Newcomer | The Fabelmans | Won | |
| 2022 | Phoenix Critics Circle | Best Actor | The Fabelmans | Nominated | |
| 2022 | Washington D.C. Area Film Critics Association | Best Youth Performance | The Fabelmans | Won | |
| 2023 | Columbus Film Critics Association | Breakthrough Film Artist | The Fabelmans | Nominated | |
| 2023 | Critics' Choice Movie Awards | Best Young Actor/Actress | The Fabelmans | Won | |
| 2023 | Critics' Choice Movie Awards | Best Acting Ensemble | The Fabelmans | Nominated (Note: Shared with the cast) | |
| 2023 | DiscussingFilm Critics Awards | Best Breakthrough Performance | The Fabelmans | Runner-up | |
| 2023 | Dorian Awards | Rising Star Award | The Fabelmans | Nominated | |
| 2023 | Georgia Film Critics Association | Breakthrough Award | The Fabelmans | Runner-up | |
| 2023 | Hollywood Critics Association | Star on the Rise Award | The Fabelmans | Won | |
| 2023 | International Cinephile Society | Best Breakthrough Performance | The Fabelmans | Nominated | |
| 2023 | Minnesota Film Critics Alliance | Best Actor | The Fabelmans | Nominated | |
| 2023 | Music City Film Critics' Association | Best Young Actor | The Fabelmans | Won | |
| 2023 | North Carolina Film Critics Association | Best Breakthrough Performance | The Fabelmans | Nominated | |
| 2023 | Online Film and Television Association | Best Breakthrough Performance: Male | The Fabelmans | Nominated | |
| 2023 | Palm Springs International Film Festival | Vanguard Award | The Fabelmans | Won | |
| 2023 | Paris Film Critics Association Awards | Best Male Revelation | The Fabelmans | Nominated | |
| 2023 | San Diego Film Critics Society | Best Actor | The Fabelmans | Nominated | |
| 2023 | Satellite Awards | Best Actor in a Motion Picture – Drama | The Fabelmans | Nominated | |
| 2023 | Screen Actors Guild Awards | Outstanding Performance by a Cast in a Motion Picture | The Fabelmans | Nominated | |
| 2024 | Denver Film Festival | 5280 Award | Saturday Night | Won | |
| 2025 | Critics' Choice Awards | Best Acting Ensemble | Saturday Night | Nominated | |
| 2025 | Golden Globe Awards | Best Actor in a Motion Picture – Musical or Comedy | Saturday Night | Nominated | |
