= Pardis (disambiguation) =

Pardis is a city in Iran.

Pardis may also refer to:

- Pardis, Khuzestan, a village in Khuzestan Province, Iran
- Pardis Parker, writer, actor, and comedian
- Pardis Sabeti, American geneticist
- Pardis Saremi, American actress
