= Happy Birthday (Finn Wolfhard album) =

Studio album by Finn Wolfhard
- Released: June 6, 2025
- Genre: Indie rock; garage punk
- Length: 24:39
- Label: AWAL
- Producer: Kai Slater; Finn Wolfhard

Finn Wolfhard chronology
Happy Birthday (2025)	Fire From The Hip (2026)

Singles from Happy Birthday
- 1. "Choose the Latter" Released: March 6, 2025; 2. "Trailers After Dark" Released: April 11, 2025; 3. "Objection!" Released: May 8, 2025

Happy Birthday is the debut studio album by the Canadian actor and musician Finn Wolfhard, released on June 6, 2025, through AWAL.

== Background and promotion ==
The song selection process for the album involved Wolfhard challenging himself to write fifty songs before 2022 ended. An introspective album, Happy Birthday was produced by Kai Slater, and incorporates the musical style of lo-fi alongside elements of power pop. The lead single, "Choose the Latter", noted as a "jangly" indie pop song, was released on March 6, 2025, alongside a self-directed music video.

To support the album, Wolfhard embarked on The Objection! Tour in June 2025. The tour began on June 5 in Los Angeles, California, and was scheduled to conclude on September 16 in Atlanta, Georgia. Wolfhard announced fall dates for the European leg of the tour in July. The tour comprised 23 dates in total.

== Reception ==
Professional ratings
Review scores
Source	Rating
AllMusic	4/5 stars
DIY	3.5/5 stars
Kerrang!	4/5 stars
Mojo	3/5 stars

Consequence described the album as "an album of tape-saturated indie rock that pulls from Elliott Smith, Ben Lee, Daniel Johnston, and some garage-punk loudness for good measure."

Tim Sendra of AllMusic noted, "The only thing holding Happy Birthday back from being classic is its brevity and maybe lack of ambition; other than that, the quality of the songs, the impact of the vocals, the excellent production, and his ability to reference the past without aping it combine to make it a superb start for a promising solo career."

Kerrang! rated the album four out of five, describing it as "only a dyed-in-the-wool music geek could have made, and that's a beautiful thing." DIY, rating it three and a half stars, stated, "the nine song album offers fans a glimpse into the world of Wolfhard, all via fuzzy indie and alternative country."

John Aizlewood of Mojo assigned it a rating of three stars and remarked, "The string-laden but lo-fi 'You' offers yet another direction and the result is an album that, in the best sense of the term, is all over the place."

== Track listing ==
All tracks are written by Finn Wolfhard.

Happy Birthday track listing
No.	Title	Length
1.	"Happy Birthday"	1:31
2.	"Choose the Latter"	2:42
3.	"Eat"	1:47
4.	"Objection!"	2:49
5.	"Everytown There's a Darling"	1:58
6.	"Trailers After Dark"	3:18
7.	"Crown"	4:34
8.	"You"	2:16
9.	"Wait"	3:44
Total length:		24:39

== Personnel ==
Credits adapted from Tidal.

=== Musicians ===
- Finn Wolfhard – lead vocals (all tracks), electric guitar (tracks 1–5, 7–9), drums (6)
- Kai Slater – electric guitar (tracks 2, 4, 6, 7, 9), bass guitar (3)
- Cadien Lake James – bass guitar (tracks 2, 7)
- Asher Case – organ (track 2)
- Isaac Lowenstein – drums (track 7)
- Sofia Jensen – electric guitar (track 7)
- Eli Schmidt – percussion (track 7), drums (9)
- Annie Leeth – strings (track 8)

=== Technical ===
- Finn Wolfhard – production (all tracks), mixing, engineering (track 8)
- Kai Slater – production (all tracks), mixing (tracks 1–7, 9)
- Andrew Humphrey – production (track 4), mixing (1–7, 9)
- Cadien Lake James – production (track 4)
- Heba Kadry – mastering
- Ben Wulkan – engineering (track 5)
- Evan Dangerfield – engineering (track 5)
