= Crash Land =

2026 film by Dempsey Bryk

- Directed by: Dempsey Bryk
- Written by: Dempsey Bryk
- Produced by: Billy Bryk; Finn Wolfhard; Julian Geneen; Dempsey Bryk
- Starring: Finn Wolfhard; Gabriel LaBelle; Billy Bryk; Noah Parker; Abby Quinn
- Cinematography: Kristofer Bonnell
- Edited by: Hanna Park
- Music by: Spencer Creaghan
- Production companies: Ursa Major Entertainment; Elevation Pictures; Redlab; Kid Brother
- Distributed by: Elevator Pictures
- Release date: March 13, 2026 (SXSW)
- Running time: 90 minutes
- Country: Canada
- Language: English

Crash Land is a Canadian comedy film produced, written and directed by Dempsey Bryk in his feature directorial debut. The film stars Finn Wolfhard, Gabriel LaBelle, Abby Quinn, Billy Bryk, and Noah Parker.

It had its world premiere at South by Southwest on March 13, 2026.

== Premise ==
The film follows a group of small-town amateur stunt performers whose lives revolve around filming dangerous and comedic stunts, navigating relationships within their community while pursuing their ambitions.

== Cast ==
- Finn Wolfhard as Sander
- Gabriel LaBelle as Lance
- Abby Quinn as Jemma
- Billy Bryk as Darby
- Noah Parker as Clay

== Production ==
Crash Land was written and directed by Dempsey Bryk, based on a story developed with Ben Snider-McGrath. It marks Bryk's first feature as a director.

The film is produced by Bryk, Billy Bryk, Finn Wolfhard, and Julian Geneen. Production companies involved include Ursa Major Entertainment, Elevation Pictures, and Redlab. Executive producers include Matthew Miller, Matt Johnson, Charles Cohen, Gabriel LaBelle, Jasmin Kar, Sam Sutcliffe, and Dias Toibazarov. The project is also associated with Kid Brother, the production company founded by Wolfhard and Billy Bryk.

== Release ==
Crash Land had its world premiere at 2026 South by Southwest & TV Festival on March 13.

The film will have a limited digital release on Letterboxd Video Store from November 12 to December 12 as a part of the platform's Unreleased Gems series.

== Reception ==
On the review aggregator website Rotten Tomatoes, 100% of 13 critics' reviews are positive.

In a review for Variety, critic Carlos Aguilar described Crash Land as "as poignant as it is rooted in… crass humor," noting its blend of reckless comedy with themes of grief and male friendship. He also highlighted the film's characters as "more lovable than unbearable," emphasizing its emotional depth despite its irreverent tone.

In a review for Deadline, critic Damon Wise described Crash Land as a coming-of-age comedy that "makes up in naive charm what it might otherwise lack in originality," noting its shift from "frat-boy gross-out comedy" to a more "thoughtful and… nuanced" story.

In a review for Screen Rant, critic Gregory Nussen described Crash Land as "an earnest film about the difficulty… for young men, to be honest about the way they feel," noting that it is "silly, sweet, and abundantly surprising." The review highlighted its blend of raucous comedy with emotional themes of grief, identity, and friendship.
