= Fire from the Hip =

2026 studio album by Finn Wolfhard

Studio album by Finn Wolfhard
- Released: July 10, 2026
- Studio: Pachyderm (Cannon Falls, Minnesota)
- Length: 35:38
- Label: AWAL
- Producer: Finn Wolfhard

Finn Wolfhard chronology
Happy Birthday (2025)	Fire from the Hip (2026)

Singles from Fire from the Hip
- 1. "I'll Let You Finish" Released: April 29, 2026; 2. "Tunnels" Released: June 10, 2026

Fire from the Hip is the second studio album by the Canadian actor and musician Finn Wolfhard, released on July 10, 2026, through AWAL. It was preceded by the lead single "I'll Let You Finish" on April 29.

== Background and recording ==
The album was recorded in February 2026 at Pachyderm Studios. Musicians featured on the album include Grant Prettyman, Hudson McNeese, Louis Nicely, and Caiden Lake James.

== Release ==
On April 29, 2026, vinyl, CD, and cassette editions of the album were made available to pre-order on Wolfhard's website.

A second single, "Tunnels", was released on June 10, 2026.

== Track listing ==
All tracks are written by Finn Wolfhard. "Follow" was co-written with Clay Frankel.

Fire from the Hip track listing
No.	Title	Length
1.	"I'll Let You Finish"	3:54
2.	"Common Side Effects"	2:00
3.	"Lights Go Down"	2:20
4.	"Follow"	3:24
5.	"Tunnels"	2:48
6.	"Trail"	2:12
7.	"Crater"	2:48
8.	"Oscilloscope"	1:28
9.	"Maggie"	3:30
10.	"Nice to Meet You Again"	4:39
11.	"Good Morning"	2:35
12.	"The Climb (Not That One)"	3:56
Total length:		35:38

== Personnel ==
Credits are adapted from Tidal.

- Finn Wolfhard – lead vocals, production, mixing (all tracks); electric guitar (tracks 1, 2, 4, 6, 8, 12), keyboards (10, 11)
- Andrew Humphrey – engineering, mixing
- Cadien Lake James – mixing (all tracks), electric guitar (4, 9), background vocals (9)
- Ramsey Bell – bass guitar (1–5, 7–12), background vocals (1–4, 7–9)
- Josh Resing – drums (1–5, 7–12), background vocals (9)
- Rand Kelly – electric guitar (1–4, 8, 12), background vocals (1, 2, 4, 9), mandolin (9), piano (10, 11)
- Grace "Gep" Repasky – background vocals (1, 3–4, 6–8, 10–12)
- Will Miller – horn (1)
- Colin Croom – guitar (3), organ (4), synthesizer (5), electric guitar (6, 12), keyboards (7, 8), piano (9)
- Clay Frankel – electric guitar (4, 9), background vocals (4, 9), piano (5), lead vocals (9)
- Ella Webster – strings (7), fiddle (12)

== Charts ==
Chart performance for Fire from the Hip
Chart (2026)	Peak position
UK Independent Albums (Official Charts)	39
