= Death and Other Details =

2024 American Television series

- Genre: Mystery; Drama
- Created by: Heidi Cole McAdams & Mike Weiss
- Showrunners: Heidi Cole McAdams; Mike Weiss
- Starring: Violett Beane; Lauren Patten; Rahul Kohli; Angela Zhou; Hugo Diego Garcia; Linda Emond; Mandy Patinkin; Pardis Saremi
- Music by: Brocker Way
- Country of origin: United States
- Original language: English
- No. of seasons: 1
- No. of episodes: 10

Production
- Executive producers: Heidi Cole McAdams; Mike Weiss; Marc Webb; Mark Martin; David Petrarca
- Producers: Shawn Wilt; James Thompson III
- Cinematography: Jimmy Lindsey; G. Magni Ágústsson; Fernando Reyes Allendes
- Editors: John L. Roberts; Billy Rich; Franzis Müller; Sondra Watanabe
- Running time: 40–52 minutes
- Production companies: Riding in Circles Productions; Last In First Out Inc.; Black Lamb Productions; ABC Signature

Original release
- Network: Hulu
- Release: January 16 – March 5, 2024

Death and Other Details is an American mystery drama television series on Hulu created by Heidi Cole McAdams and Mike Weiss, starring Mandy Patinkin and Violett Beane. The series premiered on January 16, 2024. It received generally mixed reviews from critics. In March 2024, Death and Other Details was canceled after one season.

== Premise ==
Rufus Cotesworth finds himself on a luxury cruise liner when a locked-room murder takes place.

== Cast ==
=== Main ===
- Violett Beane as Imogene Scott
- Lauren Patten as Anna Collier, Imogene's wealthy best friend, heir apparent to the Collier Mills Company
- Rahul Kohli as Sunil Bhandari, the owner of the cruise ship SS Varuna
- Angela Zhou as Teddy Goh, the crew manager on the SS Varuna
- Hugo Diego Garcia as Jules Toussaint, the head of security on the SS Varuna
- Linda Emond as Agent Hilde Eriksen, a business-minded Interpol agent
- Mandy Patinkin as Rufus Cotesworth, a detective who used to be "the world's greatest detective"
- Pardis Saremi as Leila, Anna's paranoid wife, a former clickbait journalist suffering from the after-effects of a traumatic car accident

=== Recurring ===
- David Marshall Grant as Lawrence Collier, Anna's father and the CEO of Collier Mills who is getting ready to retire, but has yet to declare his successor
- Jere Burns as Llewellyn Mathers, the Colliers' lawyer
- Michael Gladis as Keith Trubitsky, an obnoxious businessman being courted by Tripp, and later revealed to be Danny Turner, Rufus's assistant and best friend
- Jack Cutmore-Scott as Tripp Collier, Anna's brother
- Tamberla Perry as Alexandra Hochenberg, the governor of Washington, close associate of the Collier family
- Annie Q. Riegel as Winnie Goh, a crew member on the SS Varuna and Teddy's younger sister
- Danny Johnson as Father Toby Briggs, a close friend of Lawrence and Katherine's and a powerful behind-the-scenes political player
- Sincere Wilbert as That Derek, Toby's 14-year old son, a TikTok influencer
- Karoline as Eleanor Chun, an heiress to a fashion empire and Anna's former fling in business school
- Sophia Reid-Gantzert as Young Imogene
- Jayne Atkinson as Katherine Collier, Lawrence's wife
- Lisa Lu as Celia Chun, Eleanor's grandmother, a billionaire clothier in talks with the Colliers to buy a significant stake of Collier Mills
- Christian Svensson as Andreas Windeler

=== Guest starring ===
- Sofia Rosinsky as Yeva

== Episodes ==
| No. | Title | Directed by | Written by | Original release date |
|---|---|---|---|---|
| 1 | "Chapter One: Rare" | Marc Webb | Heidi Cole McAdams & Mike Weiss | January 16, 2024 |
In 2005, eleven-year-old Imogene Scott is taken in by wealthy Lawrence Collier after the death of her mother Kira, his secretary, in a car-bombing. World-famous detective Rufus Cotesworth bonds with Imogene, but she is devastated when he abruptly leaves her mother's case unsolved. Eighteen years later, Imogene joins Lawrence, his wife Katherine, daughter Anna and her wife Leila, and son Tripp on the cruise ship SS Varuna to celebrate Lawrence's retirement. Their entourage includes Washington Governor Alexandra Hochenberg, Father Toby Briggs and his influencer son Derek, and lawyer Llewellyn Mathers. Preparing to succeed Lawrence as CEO, Anna has invited the wealthy Chun family aboard to finalize a merger; Imogene is dismayed to see Cotesworth on their staff. Seeking revenge on Keith Trubitsky, Tripp's boorish investor, Imogene sneaks into his room and smashes his wristwatch. She flirts with the ship's owner Sunil Bhandari, accosts Cotesworth, and spends the night with Jules, the ship's head of security. Trubitsky is found dead, shot with a speargun, but Cotesworth erases security footage of Imogene entering Trubitsky's room and convinces her to help him find the killer. She realizes that Trubitsky was working with Cotesworth, and reluctantly agrees to take his place.
| 2 | "Chapter Two: Sordid" | David Petrarca | Ryan Maldonado & Eduardo Javier Canto | January 16, 2024 |
Cotesworth explains that Trubitsky was actually Danny, his longtime assistant and trusted friend. Six months earlier, Danny coaxed him out of retirement to pursue the Colliers' connection to "Viktor Sams", the corporate blackmailer who killed Imogene's mother. Posing as Trubitsky, Danny was able to gather information but his journal is missing, presumably taken by his killer. Imogene informs Anna that she is secretly assisting Cotesworth, who questions the passengers and crew, though Lawrence refuses to be interviewed. Leila, who became paranoid after a mysterious car accident, accused Trubitsky of following her, and later confronted him for taking a picture of her and the family. Toby, a known political kingmaker, lies about introducing Trubitsky to Alexandra, while Tripp was furious with Trubitsky for pulling out of his cryptocurrency scheme. Cotesworth deduces that Tripp and Alexandra were sleeping together, and the killer hid inside a bar cart that Alexandra ordered to Trubitsky's room. Sunil caught Trubitsky attempting to enter his office, where Cotesworth discovers a secret safe. Billions are at stake in the Colliers' deal with Celia Chun, making everyone on the Varuna a suspect, as Interpol Inspector Hilde Eriksen arrives to take over the investigation.
| 3 | "Chapter Three: Troublesome" | Alrick Riley | Nick Bragg | January 23, 2024 |
Unsettled by the murder, Celia gives Anna twenty-four hours to prove her family was not involved. The ship's maître d', Teddy Goh, whose family works on board, warns that the investigation places them under extra scrutiny. Cotesworth accompanies the highly efficient Inspector Eriksen, whose focus on the smashed watch and missing footage will make Imogene the prime suspect. Llewellyn is missing, and Alexandra presses Toby to reveal the political donor who asked her to send the bar cart to Trubitsky. Anna warns Tripp that his anger issues and failed deal with Trubitsky make him a suspect. Questioned by Eriksen, Jules chooses not to reveal he was with Imogene during the time of the murder. Sunil catches Imogene breaking into his safe, and she admits that Cotesworth believes the Colliers' financial records — brought on board for the Chuns' merger — contain blackmail payments to Viktor Sams. Instead, the files reveal the company is bankrupt and procured a shipment of “Captionem Blue”, a now-illegal carcinogenic clothing dye. Anna discovers her mother and Toby are having an affair. Searching the crew’s quarters, Eriksen and Cotesworth learn Jules is a wanted criminal, while Imogene follows Leila through a hidden door and is captured by Jules.
| 4 | "Chapter Four: Hidden" | Alrick Riley | Mike Weiss | January 30, 2024 |
Six months earlier, Sunil was saved from muggers by Jules and offered him a job. Eriksen and Cotesworth realize Jules staged this to infiltrate the cruise and is an international fugitive. The ship is locked down, confining Anna with Celia's granddaughter Eleanor, her ex-girlfriend, and they give in to their mutual desire. Imogene offers to help Jules, who is harboring a family of Ukrainian refugees. Eriksen discovers Llewellyn bound and gagged, but he refuses to explain. Celia leverages Toby with knowledge of his affair with Katherine, while Imogene brings Cotesworth to Jules, followed by Sunil and Teddy. Refugee Yeva overheard the murder while sneaking through the ship's vents, indicating that Teddy killed Trubitsky. Teddy explains she is a dominatrix and Yeva actually overheard her with Llewellyn, but Imogene and Cotesworth deduce she is covering for her sister Winnie. Cotesworth announces Teddy's arrest, provoking Winnie into confessing that she killed Trubitsky herself. Jules stays behind to allow Sunil and Imogene to take the refugees to shore, and is captured by Eriksen. Alexandra is blackmailed with photos of her trysts with Tripp. Cotesworth finds Leila, who reveals that she knew Danny was his assistant and lives in fear of Viktor Sams.
| 5 | "Chapter Five: Exquisite" | Yangzom Brauen | Jess Kimball Leslie | February 6, 2024 |
The night he was murdered, Danny came clean about his investigation to Leila, who warned him the Colliers are being targeted by Sams. Imogene and Sunil part ways with the refugees in Malta, where they spend a romantic day together. Six months earlier, Leila met with an NSA source whose life was ruined for investigating Sams, and Leila's car was hacked and driven off a cliff, resulting in her paranoia. Teddy struggles to learn how Sams recruited Winnie to kill Trubitsky, while Leila is fed up not being believed by Anna and wants a divorce. Sunil admits to Imogene that the Varuna has left him penniless, and gives the Captionem Blue document to an associate to investigate. The Chuns demand 51% control of the Colliers' company in exchange for a $3 billion infusion, which Lawrence unexpectedly accepts. Leila discovers a hidden camera in her room Winnie could not have planted, indicating Sams has more than one accomplice on board. Imogene and Sunil evade Andreas, Sams' associate, and return to the Varuna. Alexandra's health is deteriorating, and she confronts Llewellyn about the blackmail. Cotesworth uncovers Sams' operation, hidden within the ship itself.
| 6 | "Chapter Six: Tragic" | Yangzom Brauen | Louisa Levy & Paul Alan Cope | February 13, 2024 |
As a child, Imogene sees a television interview declaring Cotesworth "the world’s greatest detective". Cotesworth, Teddy, and Leila discover Sams' server farm inside the Varuna, matching his movements to the ship's cruise schedule. Locked in the hold, Jules reveals to Winnie the true identity of the man she killed. As Anna and Tripp share a drunken karaoke rendition of "Come Sail Away", Eriksen indulges Llewellyn's masochistic proclivities and Leila hacks into the servers. Receiving threatening calls from Sams, Sunil is tied up by Imogene and Cotesworth, admitting that Sams funded the Varuna then ordered him to report on their murder investigation. Alexandra gives Eriksen files supposedly incriminating Lawrence, but the pages are blank; Alexandra collapses and dies, having contracted necrotizing fasciitis from Winnie's vitamin injections. Confirming that the Colliers used Captionem Blue at a Chinese factory in 2005, Imogene confronts Anna. Accessing Sams' blackmail files, Leila finds footage of Anna having sex with Eleanor. The ship's power goes out, and a guilt-stricken Llewellyn taunts Cotesworth for missing a major clue and declares his love for Kira before leaping to his death. Cotesworth admits to Imogene that he is a fraud, but she demands to know the truth about her mother's case.
| 7 | "Chapter Seven: Memorable" | James Griffiths | Myung Joh Wesner | February 20, 2024 |
Cotesworth guides Imogene through his memories: In 2005, six months after Kira's death, he is hired by Lawrence to investigate. Arriving at the Colliers' Seattle estate, he interviews Imogene's grandmother, Lawrence, Katherine, Toby, and Llewellyn, who admits to having feelings for Kira. Danny finds Kira's datebook with a missing page, leading them to a diner where an employee overheard her having an argument. Despite Cotesworth's promise to young Imogene to solve her mother's murder, and his encouragement of her powers of observation and deduction, he is fired by the Colliers, ostensibly to protect Imogene from further trauma. Cotesworth and Danny remain on the trail of Viktor Sams and his high-tech blackmail operation over a decade later, despite threats from Llewellyn to leave Kira's case alone. Imogene confronts her childhood memories leading up to her mother's death, finally relinquishing her fear that she saw Viktor Sams but blocked out the memory. She remembers her mother's argument at the diner was with Alexandra, then a U.S. attorney who refused to build a case using Kira's evidence implicating the Colliers in the deaths of five employees. In the present, Imogene confronts Kira's key witness: Celia Chun.
| 8 | "Chapter Eight: Vanishing" | James Griffiths | Heidi Cole McAdams & Angela Zhou | February 27, 2024 |
The ship's power has been sabotaged, and Teddy blames herself for Llewellyn's death. Slipped a key by Imogene, Jules escapes his cell, while Teddy realizes Llewellyn drank poisoned champagne, and she and Jules free Sunil. Celia announces a secret learned from Toby: Anna is not Lawrence's daughter, and Katherine admits that Llewellyn is Anna's real father. Celia reveals that she and her husband met working at a clothing factory in Jiangsu fifty years ago. Collier Mills took over the factory, leading to the death of Celia's husband and others from Captionem Blue. Paid off by the company, Celia swore revenge and used the money to build her own business empire. Decades later, she was approached by Kira with evidence that Lawrence was responsible. Imogene confronts Lawrence, whom Anna reveals is suffering from dementia; confusing Imogene for her mother, he admits to having Kira killed. Eriksen and Cotesworth interrogate the head waiter who served Llewellyn a bottle poisoned with ricin, sent by Katherine. Leila believes Katherine is Viktor Sams, but Anna finds her mother dead in the pool. Sunil and Jules discover bombs below deck, as Andreas and his men seize control of the ship.
| 9 | "Chapter Nine: Impossible" | Dinh Thai | Louisa Levy | March 5, 2024 |
All lifeboats are sent to shore with the "innocent" passengers and crew, as the unseen Sams holds an auction: the remaining passengers are given one hour to bid for the nine seats left on Sams' helicopter, the last means of escaping before the bombs detonate. Celia refuses to play, but Eleanor makes her own deal to secure a seat. Toby coerces Lawrence into signing a check and makes a winning bid for himself, leaving Tripp unable to bid for himself and his family. Sunil, Teddy, Leila, and Jules turn to Imogene for a plan, and she steals Danny's coded journal from Andreas. Deciphering Danny's notes, they see Sams was unknowingly filmed on Derek's phone. For her selflessness, Celia is named the auction's sole winner, but a group of passengers steal the helicopter only for it to explode mid-flight. Imogene deduces that Viktor Sams is Eriksen, who orchestrated the cruise to trap those responsible for Lawrence escaping justice: his mind is too far gone, but she had Alexandra and Llewellyn poisoned, and had Danny killed for spotting her in disguise as a crew member. Face to face with Eriksen, Imogene realizes she is Kira, just as the ship explodes.
| 10 | "Chapter Ten: Chilling" | Dinh Thai | Heidi Cole McAdams & Mike Weiss | March 5, 2024 |
Escaping the sinking Varuna with Imogene, Kira explains that in 2005 she managed to kill a hitman sent by the Colliers, and arranged to disappear through Andreas, who refused to let her go on the run with a child. Forced to leave Imogene behind, Kira faked her own death in the car-bombing, and rededicated her life to fighting the rich and powerful as Viktor Sams. Cotesworth and the remaining passengers are rescued, while Imogene urges her mother that her revenge is now complete. Six months later, Imogene visits a ski resort with her mother, who continues to run her global blackmail network. Cotesworth, Leila, Teddy, and Jules confront Kira, having deduced that the now bankrupt Lawrence's dementia is the result of Kira poisoning him with Captionem Blue. They saved the servers from the Varuna and Sunil is willing to testify, leading to a raid on Kira's operation and she is arrested. Awaiting trial, Sunil calls Imogene, but she shares a kiss with Jules instead. Anna is revealed to have killed Katherine in anger, but is now in debt to Kira. At the resort, Imogene, Jules, Leila, and Teddy discover another grisly murder.

== Production ==
=== Development ===
The series was ordered by Hulu in March 2022, then called Career Opportunities in Murder and Mayhem, with Mandy Patinkin attached in the lead role. It was written and executive produced by Mike Weiss and Heidi Cole McAdams, with the pair also serving as co-showrunners. Marc Webb directed the pilot and executive produced via Black Lamb. Angela Zhou acted in the pilot, and joined the writers room for the series, as well as continuing her acting role as Teddy Goh, the crew manager on the SS Varuna.

Weiss and McAdams, creators of the ten-episode series, describe themselves as huge fans of the work of Agatha Christie and "wanted to capture the atmosphere of those works and drag her style into our contemporary world." Mandy Patinkin's character is inspired by famous fictional detectives, including Hercule Poirot, Sam Spade, Sherlock Holmes, and Philip Marlowe. Among the production staff are production designer James Philpott and costume designer Mandi Line. In March 2024, Hulu canceled the series after one season.

=== Casting ===
When the series was picked up in March 2022, it was reported that Patinkin would star alongside Violett Beane, Lauren Patten, Hugo Diego Garcia, Angela Zhou, Pardis Saremi, and Rahul Kohli. In August 2022, Annie Q. Riegel was added to the cast. In September 2022, Linda Emond, Jayne Atkinson, and David Marshall Grant were added to the cast. In November 2022, Christian Svensson joined the cast.

== Release ==
Death and Other Details premiered on Hulu in the United States on January 16, 2024. Internationally, the series was released on Disney+.

== Reception ==
=== Viewership ===
TVision, using its Power Score to evaluate CTV programming through viewership and engagement across over 1,000 apps, reported that Death and Other Details was the fourth most-streamed series from January 1–21. JustWatch, a guide to streaming content with access to data from more than 20 million users around the world, calculated that it was the fifth most-streamed series in the U.S. from January 22–28. Whip Media, which tracks viewership data for the more than 25 million worldwide users of its TV Time app, said that Death and Other Details was one of the five most-streamed original series in the U.S. from January 28 to February 4.

=== Critical response ===
The review aggregator website Rotten Tomatoes reported a 55% approval rating with an average rating of 6.2/10, based on 33 critic reviews. The website's critics consensus reads, "Death and Other Details has plenty of ideas to spice up the classic whodunnit, but its fatal flaw proves to be a lack of cohesiveness in the bigger picture." Metacritic, which uses a weighted average, assigned a score of 60 out of 100 based on 19 critics, indicating "mixed or average reviews".

Chicago Tribune gave the show 3.5 stars saying "the show might be derivative — and yet another outing about the ultra-rich — but it’s so much fun." The A.V. Club gave the show a B rating and described it as "a vivid caper that feels both cozy and refreshing at the same time."

Less positive was Time, which described the show as "Frankensteined together from pieces of existing shows by a roomful of executives—or an algorithm—desperate for a hit." Variety described the show as "Intricately stylized, boasting dizzying twists and turns" but criticized the complexity saying "[a]s the storylines and secrets pile up, the mystery becomes more of a confusing maze than an intriguing puzzle."

=== Accolades ===
Death and Other Details was one of 200 television series that received the ReFrame Stamp for the years 2023 to 2024. The stamp is awarded by the gender equity coalition ReFrame and industry database IMDbPro for film and television projects that are proven to have gender-balanced hiring, with stamps being awarded to projects that hire female-identifying people, especially women of color, in four out of eight key roles for their production.

The series was nominated for Best Production Design in a Dramatic Series at the 2024 Leo Awards.
