= Hell of a Summer =

2023 film by Finn Wolfhard and Billy Bryk

- Theatrical release poster
- Directed by: Billy Bryk; Finn Wolfhard
- Written by: Billy Bryk; Finn Wolfhard
- Produced by: Michael Costigan; Jason Bateman; Finn Wolfhard; Billy Bryk; Jay Van Hoy; Fred Hechinger
- Starring: Fred Hechinger; Abby Quinn; D'Pharaoh Woon-A-Tai; Billy Bryk; Finn Wolfhard; Pardis Saremi; Rosebud Baker; Adam Pally
- Cinematography: Kristofer Bonnell
- Edited by: Christine Armstrong
- Music by: Jay McCarrol
- Production companies: 30West; Aggregate Films; Kid Brother Productions
- Distributed by: Neon
- Release dates: September 10, 2023 (TIFF); April 4, 2025 (United States)
- Running time: 85 minutes
- Countries: Canada; United States
- Language: English
- Budget: $3 million
- Box office: $3.2 million

Hell of a Summer is a 2023 comedy horror film written and directed by Finn Wolfhard and Billy Bryk. It stars Fred Hechinger, Abby Quinn, D'Pharaoh Woon-A-Tai, Bryk, Wolfhard, Pardis Saremi, Rosebud Baker, and Adam Pally. The film follows a group of counselors at a summer camp who are targeted by a mysterious, devil-masked killer.

It premiered at the Toronto International Film Festival on September 10, 2023, and was released by Neon on April 4, 2025. It received mixed reviews from critics.

== Plot ==
Owners of Camp Pineway, John and Kathy, are relaxing by the campgrounds lakeside one night. John is murdered when an acoustic guitar is shoved into his mouth, while Kathy has a knife inserted into her skull. The killer, an individual donning a devil mask, slips away into the night.

Eleven counselors arrive at the campgrounds a day early to ensure opening operations go smoothly. Among them is 24-year-old Jason Hochberg, a frequent returner and admirer of the camp who is repeatedly nitpicked for his age. Jason is given temporary leadership after finding a note that informs him of an "emergency" between John and Kathy. Though initially hopeful, Jason quickly doubts his decision to revisit the job and finds it difficult to connect with the other counselors, which include Claire, his friend who has a crush on him.

The group splits up once night comes. Demi, a popular social media influencer, is violently slaughtered inside of her cabin. While doing routine checkups, Jason finds her body in bed and begs the group (who believes he's playing a prank) to escape the property. Everyone heads to her cabin, only to discover her corpse is no longer present. Noelle, a girl obsessed with spirits and the occult, horrifies the group by stating the blood in the bed is Demi's. Everyone races to their cars only to find that the engines won't start. During the chaos, two more counselors — Miley and Mike — are seemingly killed in the mess hall.

While barricading themselves in a cabin, the remaining group notices that the aforementioned duo are missing. After a randomized card drawing, Ezra, Jason and Ari leave the cabin to search for them. Inside of the mess hall, they discover Miley's severed head inside of the fridge, causing them to flee in terror and get split up. Ari is abducted and stabbed with a knife coated in peanut butter due to his life-threatening peanut allergy. The killer drags his lifeless body away. Ezra returns to the group only to get accidentally maced with bear spray.

Tensions skyrocket after a Ouija board reading (along with adamant reasoning from Ezra) which deduces that Jason is the killer. Bobby, believing that he killed everyone due to their attractiveness, and being jealous that he wasn't killed, ties him up. Claire saves Jason and the two escape into the woods. Claire and Jason find John and Kathy's bodies and Claire wants to flee the property, but Jason decides to rush back to save the counselors instead. Claire leaves the area in hopes of finding help. While the rest of the counselors search for assistance, Noelle is stabbed and subsequently murdered by having her head bashed in with a rock. Two killers appear, each with an identical outfit and mask.

The killers, revealed to be Demi and Mike, began the killing spree as a ploy for media success and internet fame. The unaware Chris barges into their room, and the two join the group, hiding their identities. Jason arrives and is knocked out by Mike. Meanwhile, Ezra is murdered after the killer breaks his leg so he can't run then swings an axe into his head. One of the killers is seen putting a bloody knife into Jason's hand, who is knocked out, to get his fingerprints. Chris narrowly escapes one of the killers and regroups with Shannon, but Bobby is chased by Mike into a cabin. Claire, who decided to stay behind to rescue Jason, smashes a bottle onto Mike's head.

A lengthy scuffle ensues between Bobby and Mike, and amidst the altercation, the cabin is set ablaze. Bobby eventually stabs Mike in the throat, killing him, but is stabbed in the abdomen. Meanwhile, Claire, armed with a bow and arrow, discovers Jason tied to a chair with Demi holding a knife to his throat. Jason repeats an earlier archery lesson, and Claire shoots an arrow into Demi's eye. Claire stomps the arrowhead into her skull before running away with Jason. He saves Bobby from the burning cabin, letting him know he won't die from his stab wound.

The remaining survivors — Chris, Bobby, Shannon, Claire, and Jason — all join. Shannon affirms her love for Chris while Jason and Claire share a kiss.

== Cast ==
- Fred Hechinger as Jason Hochberg
- Abby Quinn as Claire
- D'Pharaoh Woon-A-Tai as Mike
- Billy Bryk as Bobby
- Finn Wolfhard as Chris
- Pardis Saremi as Demi
- Rosebud Baker as Kathy
- Adam Pally as John
- Susan Coyne as Maggie Hochberg, Jason's mother
- Krista Nazaire as Shannon
- Matthew Finlan as Ezra
- Daniel Gravelle as Ari
- Julia Doyle as Miley
- Julia Lalonde as Noelle

== Production ==
In 2019, Finn Wolfhard and Billy Bryk met on the set of Ghostbusters: Afterlife and quickly realized they shared a similar sense of humor. Eager to write a film together, they experimented with different ideas until they both settled on a slasher concept. Their first draft, a 70-page script, drew inspiration from their favorite teen comedies and horror films, with a particular nod to Edgar Wright's Shaun of the Dead (2004). The project hit a pause in 2020 when the COVID-19 pandemic struck, and it was not until after the lockdowns were lifted that they began searching for financing. Wolfhard, who was 19 in 2022, initially struggled to secure funding, as investors often pointed to his young age and inexperience. Eventually, 30West stepped in to fully finance and executive produce the film.

Hell of a Summer was announced in July 2022 with Wolfhard and Bryk also co-directing and starring in the film, making it Bryk's directorial debut. The film was produced by Jason Bateman and Michael Costigan's Aggregate Films, along with Jay Van Hoy. Fred Hechinger also served as producer and joined the main cast alongside D'Pharaoh Woon-A-Tai, Abby Quinn, and Pardis Saremi. Wolfhard stated that he and Bryk aimed to cast as many undiscovered talents as possible. Sara Kay, Jenny Lewis, and Carmen Cuba assisted with the casting.

Principal photography began in July 2022 in Ontario, Canada, and concluded in August after 19 days. By December, the film was in the editing process and in post-production by February 2023.

== Release ==
Hell of a Summer premiered at the Toronto International Film Festival on September 10, 2023, where it was named second runner-up for the People's Choice Award for Midnight Madness. In August 2024, Neon acquired the United States distribution rights. The film was released in the United States on April 4, 2025. It was previously scheduled for April 18, 2025.

== Reception ==
=== Box office ===
In the United States and Canada, Hell of a Summer was released alongside A Minecraft Movie, and was projected to gross around $1 million from 1,255 theaters in its opening weekend. It made $720,000 on its first day, including $215,000 from Thursday night previews. It went on to debut to $1.8 million, finishing in eighth. Audiences surveyed by PostTrak on select cities gave the film an overall positive score of 87% (including an average rating of 4 out of 5 stars), with 81% saying they would definitely recommend the film.

=== Critical response ===
On the review aggregator website Rotten Tomatoes, 49% of 68 critics' reviews are positive, with an average rating of 5.6/10. The website's consensus reads: "Hell of a Summer shows some promising ingenuity from its young directorial duo, but its lack of tonal cohesion also indicates some room for improvement." Metacritic, which uses a weighted average, assigned the film a score of 57 out of 100, based on 11 critics, indicating "mixed or average" reviews.

Valerie Complex of Deadline Hollywood gave the film a positive review. She praised Wolfhard and Bryk's direction, saying "they craft a distinct cinematic piece that is both a tribute to and a reinvention of the slasher genre". She wrote the film's lighting was an issue, which causes some of the nighttime scenes to be dimly lit. She ended her review writing that the film "is a delightful mix that strikes the right balance of '80s horror nostalgia and fresh, modern creativity. While it occasionally stumbles in its visual execution, the clever narrative and sharp societal insights ensure it's a movie worth watching." Jourdain Searles from The Hollywood Reporter said of the film, "The biggest problem with Hell of a Summer is that there's really not much to say about it. Watching it is like being in a freshman film class in which the professor is asking everyone to come up with detailed notes on how to improve the film. But making a film is still an achievement in itself, paving the way for more polished work in the future. Maybe it's enough that Hell of a Summer leaves us eagerly wondering what Bryk and Wolfhard will make next."

Peter Debruge of Variety noted the homages to earlier slasher films, such as Friday the 13th and Scream, writing "the movie's hella derivative, but still quite entertaining, with an appealing cast and memorable characters". Writing for The New York Times, Calum Marsh labelled the film "surprisingly tame" and "boring". David Ehrlich of IndieWire graded the film a B−.
