= Ripped and Torn =

Studio album by Lifeguard
- Released: June 6, 2025
- Recorded: 2024
- Studio: Palisades; Stülo
- Length: 30:43
- Label: Matador
- Producer: Randy Randall

Singles from Ripped and Torn
- 1. "It Will Get Worse" Released: April 8, 2025; 2. "Under Your Reach" Released: May 7, 2025; 3. "Like You'll Lose" Released: June 4, 2025

Ripped and Torn is the debut studio album by American indie rock band Lifeguard. It was released on June 6, 2025, through Matador Records.

== Recording ==
Recording for Ripped and Torn took place in the band's hometown Chicago in 2024, along with Randy Randall of No Age who produced the album.

== Critical reception ==
Ripped and Torn
Aggregate scores
Source	Rating
AnyDecentMusic?	7.2/10
Metacritic	81/100
Review scores
Source	Rating
AllMusic	4/5 stars
Dork	3/5 stars
Far Out	4.5/5 stars
God Is in the TV	8/10
The Guardian	4/5 stars
Pitchfork	7.9/10
Rolling Stone	4/5 stars

Ripped and Torn has received positive early reviews prior to its release. Michael Tedder of Stereogum selected the album as their "Album of the Week". Rolling Stone ranked Ripped and Torn no. 21 in their 100 Best Albums of 2025.

== Track listing ==
All tracks are written by Asher Case, Isaac Lowenstein, and Kai Slater.

Ripped and Torn track listing
No.	Title	Length
1.	"A Tightwire"	2:19
2.	"It Will Get Worse"	2:53
3.	"Me and My Flashes"	0:23
4.	"Under Your Reach"	3:47
5.	"How to Say Deisar"	4:03
6.	"(I Wanna) Break Out"	1:36
7.	"Like You'll Lose"	4:02
8.	"Music for 3 Drums"	1:02
9.	"France And"	2:26
10.	"Charlie's Vox"	1:16
11.	"Ripped + Torn"	3:29
12.	"T.L.A."	3:27
Total length:		30:43

== Personnel ==
Credits adapted from the album's liner notes and Tidal.

=== Lifeguard ===
- Asher Case – bass, baritone guitar, vocals, recording
- Isaac Lowenstein – drums, dub, noise, recording
- Kai Slater – guitar, vocals, recording

=== Technical ===
- Randy Randall – production, mixing, recording
- Mike Bozzi – mastering
- Andrew Humphrey – recording
