= Night Shifts (film) =

2020 Canadian short comedy film

- Directed by: Finn Wolfhard
- Written by: Finn Wolfhard
- Produced by: Susan E. Kavanagh; Brando Crawford; Faith Sparrow-Crawford; Ryan Thomson; Eric Wolfhard
- Starring: Billy Bryk; Artoun Nazareth; Malcolm Sparrow-Crawford
- Cinematography: Cole Graham
- Edited by: Jeremy Schaulin-Rioux
- Production company: Bring Out Vinnie Productions
- Release dates: August 24, 2020 (Fantasia); February 14, 2021
- Running time: 4 minutes
- Country: Canada
- Language: English

Night Shifts is a 2020 Canadian short comedy film written and directed by Finn Wolfhard. It follows a man (Artoun Nazareth) who begins robbing a store but stops when he and the cashier (Billy Bryk) recognize each other as old friends from high school.

The short film made its Canadian premiere at the Fantasia International Film Festival on August 24, 2020, where it also received the silver Audience Award for Best Canadian Short.

== Synopsis ==
Convenience store clerk Billy is held at gunpoint by robber Artoun, who stops when they recognize each other as old friends from high school. The two reconnect on the floor of the store. Artoun reveals he sold his car to their mutual friend Elijah, and thus came to rob the store on a bike. Billy admits he was recently fired from his acting gig at an escape room. The two argue after Billy points out that Artoun went from being the coolest guy in high school to robbing a convenience store on a bike. Artoun retaliates by pointing his gun in Billy's face until he apologizes.

Artoun tries to return the conversation to normal, but Billy angrily calls him out for threatening him. Artoun brushes him off, claiming that Billy's negative attitude is why they stopped hanging out after high school. Police show up as a result of the silent alarm being pressed, prompting Artoun to take Billy hostage. When the police officer enters, the two recognize him as Elijah. The three stand in awkward silence while more police cars arrive outside.

== Cast ==
- Billy Bryk as Billy
- Artoun Nazareth as Artoun
- Malcolm Sparrow-Crawford as Elijah

== Production ==
On December 10, 2019, Wolfhard launched a fundraising campaign to produce the short film through Indiegogo, offering various incentives to those who donated, and attained its goal of $26,000 Canadian dollars in one day. The film was shot in 12 hours at a Vancouver convenience store, and was briefly interrupted when a real attempted robbery occurred.

== Release ==
The film premiered at the Fantasia Film Festival on August 24, 2020, and had its American premiere at the Atlanta Shortsfest five days later. It was also an official selection for the 2020 Calgary International Film Festival.

The 2021 TIFF Next Wave presented a free screening of the film on February 13, 2021. Wolfhard released Night Shifts via his YouTube channel the next day, though it was made private for undisclosed reasons at an unknown date, and remains so as of January 2026.

== Reception ==
In a positive review, Kat Hughes of The Hollywood News rated the film 4/5 stars and stated that Night Shifts "demonstrates that Wolfhard has clearly been paying attention to the directors he has worked with as an actor" and found the dialogue to be "tightly written, funny, and conveys an impressive multitude of history and information in such a small amount of time" while adding that the film is "a clever and stylish little short that more than exemplifies that, should his acting work dry up, Finn Wolfhard has a promising career as a director." Diego Andaluz of The Global Film Podcast praised Wolfhard's "witty screenplay" and felt the film "proves that [Wolfhard] may have quite a future behind the camera."

The film received the silver Audience Award for Best Canadian Short at the Fantasia Film Festival. Wolfhard received the Best Director Award at the Atlanta Shortsfest.
