= Pardis Saremi =

American actress

Pardis Saremi is an American television and film actress, and model. Her film roles have included Literally, Right Before Aaron (2017) and Hell of a Summer (2023).

== Career ==
Saremi had her debut on-screen appearance in the 2017 romantic-comedy Literally, Right Before Aaron alongside Justin Long, Peter Gallagher, Kristen Schaal, and John Cho. Saremi then had a small role as a receptionist in television film The Pom Pom Murders in 2020, and later appeared in the pandemic web series The Baddest Bad Boy.

She appeared alongside Finn Wolfhard in the 2023 film Hell of a Summer. In 2024, Saremi appeared in the film Chapel, alongside Jeremy Sumpter. She had a main role in the Hulu murder mystery series Death and Other Details, with Mandy Patinkin, which ran for one season in 2024.

== Personal life ==
Her parents migrated from Iran to USA in the 90s. She has also worked as a model, and once owned her own clothing store.

== Filmography ==
Key
†	Denotes works that have not yet been released

Year	Title	Role	Notes
2017	Literally, Right Before Aaron		
2020	The Baddest Bad Boy		
2020	Ruthless Renegade	Receptionist	
2021	Shonda	Shonda	Short
2023	Hell of a Summer	Demi	
2024	Chapel	Sofia	
2024	Death and Other Details	Leila	10 episodes
2026	The 'Burbs	Lauryn	1 episode
2026	FBI	Zara	3 episodes
