= Billy Bryk =

Canadian actor and filmmaker

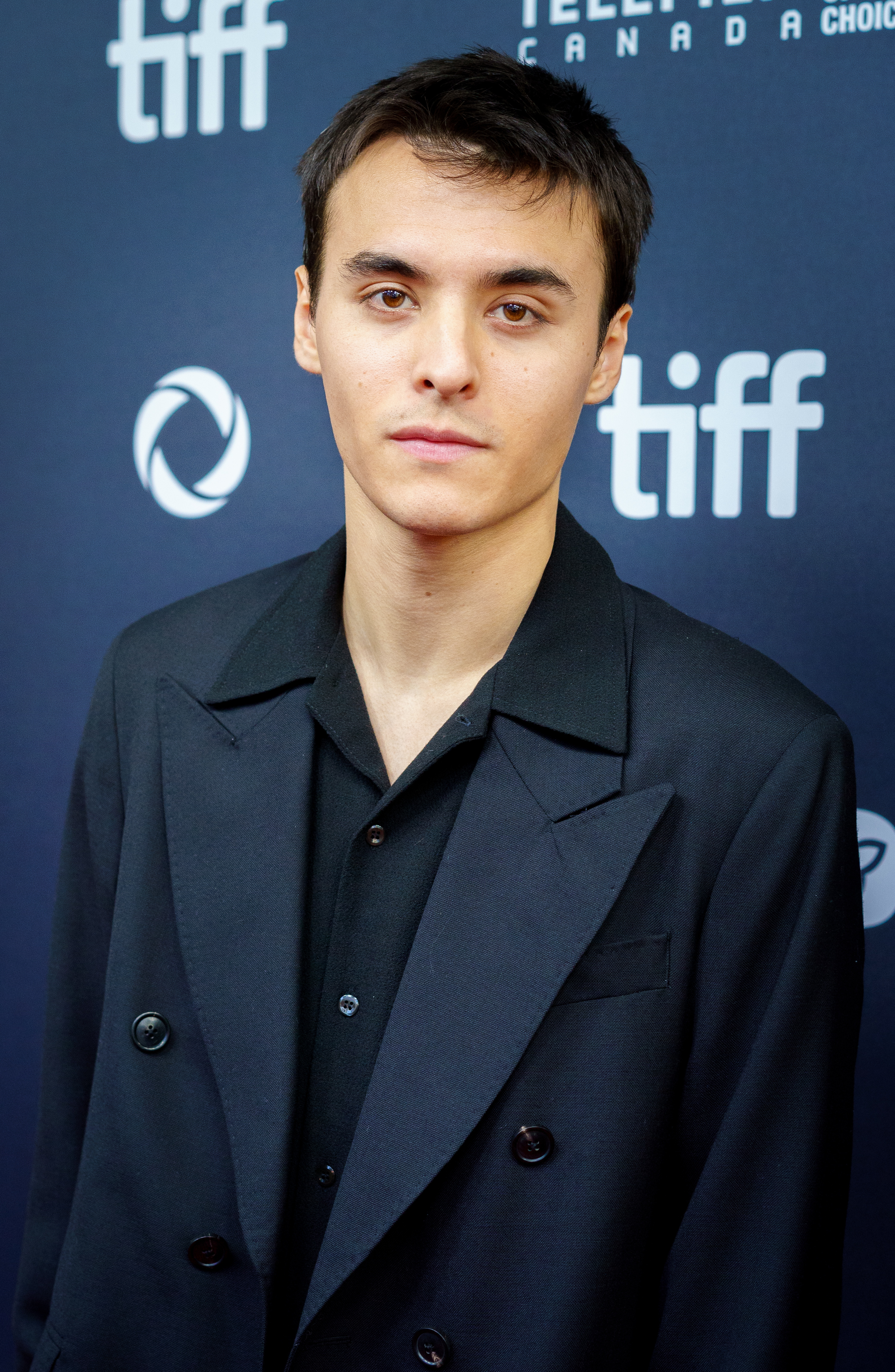
- Bryk in 2024
- Occupation: Actor
- Years active: 2019–present
- Parents: Greg Bryk (father); Danielle Nicholas Bryk (mother)
- Relatives: Dempsey Bryk (brother)

Billy Bryk is a Canadian actor and filmmaker, best known as co-director with Finn Wolfhard of the 2023 film Hell of a Summer.

== Life and career ==
Billy Bryk is the son of actor Greg Bryk and interior designer Danielle Bryk. He has an older brother, Dempsey (also an actor), and a younger sister, Ella. He is part Filipino on his mother’s side.

Bryk's acting work includes roles in the films Night Shifts, Ghostbusters: Afterlife and When You Finish Saving the World, and a recurring role as Billy Clanton in the fourth season of Wynonna Earp.

Bryk and Finn Wolfhard first met in Toronto's Kensington Market, having a brief conversation about their shared love of the comedy web series Jake and Amir, but did not meet again until they were both cast in Ghostbusters: Afterlife more than a year later. They have since worked together on several occasions, including Night Shifts, When You Finish Saving the World, Hell of a Summer and the Lackluster Video podcast for Headgum. Hell of a Summer debuted at the 2023 Toronto International Film Festival, where it was named second runner-up for the People's Choice Award for Midnight Madness.

== Filmography ==
=== Film ===
| Year | Title | Role | Notes |
|---|---|---|---|
| 2020 | Night Shifts | Billy | Short film |
| 2021 | Crisis | David Reimann | |
| 2021 | Ghostbusters: Afterlife | Zahk | |
| 2021 | L for Loser | Stewie | Short film |
| 2022 | When You Finish Saving the World | Kyle | |
| 2023 | Hell of a Summer | Bobby | Also co-writer, co-director and producer |
| 2024 | Saturday Night | Carl | |
| 2024 | Friendship | Tony | |
| 2026 | Roommates | Michael | |
| 2026 | Crash Land | Darby | Also producer |

=== Television ===
| Year | Title | Role | Notes |
|---|---|---|---|
| 2019 | Jett | Slim | Episode: "Phoenix" |
| 2020–2021 | Wynonna Earp | Billy Clanton | 6 episodes |
