= National Board of Review Awards 2022 =

American film award

94th NBR Awards
- Date: December 8, 2022
- Hosted by: Willie Geist

Highlights
- Best Film: Top Gun: Maverick

The 94th National Board of Review Awards, honoring the best in film for 2022, were announced on December 8, 2022.

The annual awards gala was held on January 8, 2023, at Cipriani 42nd Street in New York City, and hosted by television personality and journalist Willie Geist.

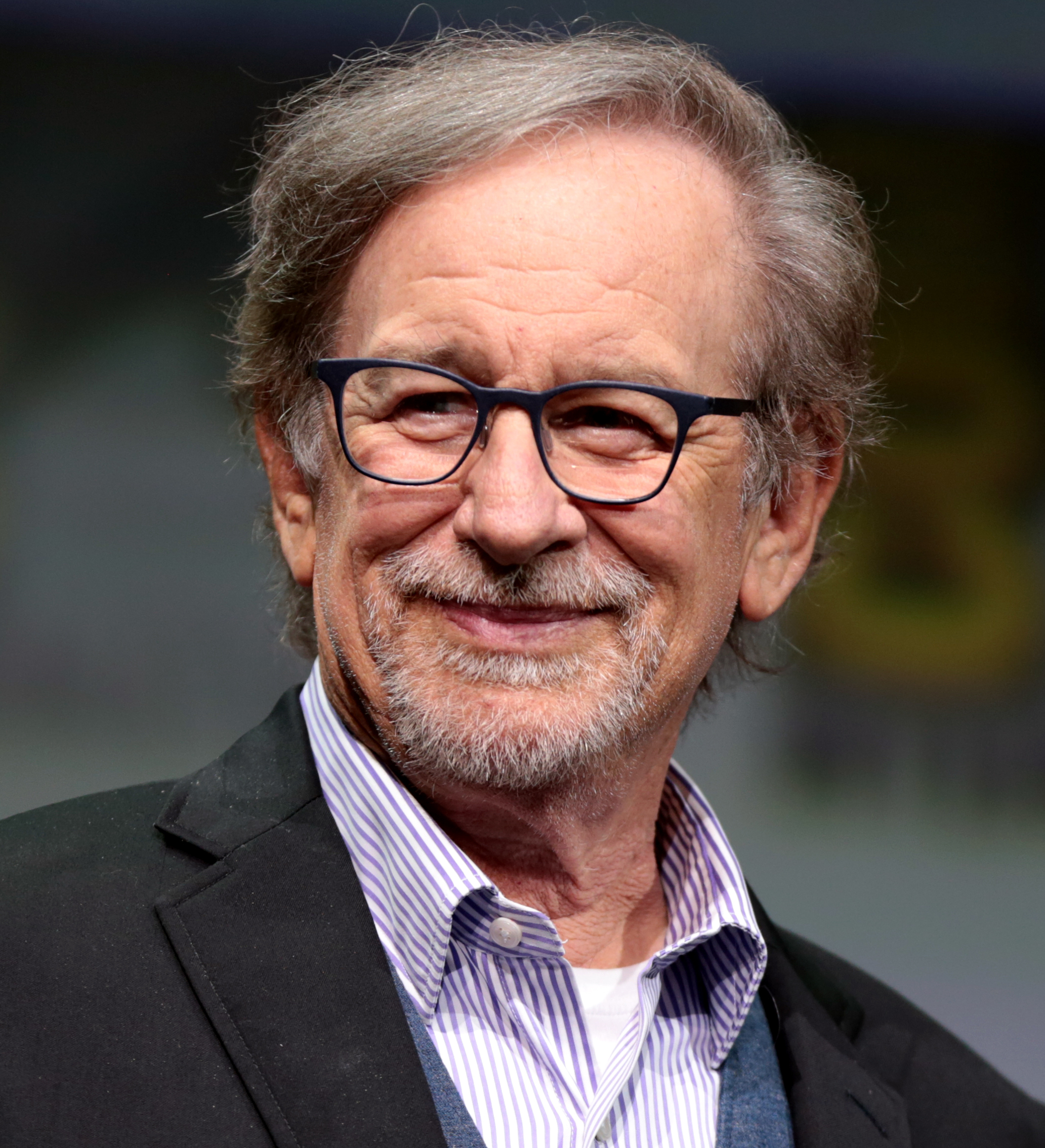
Steven Spielberg, Best Director winner

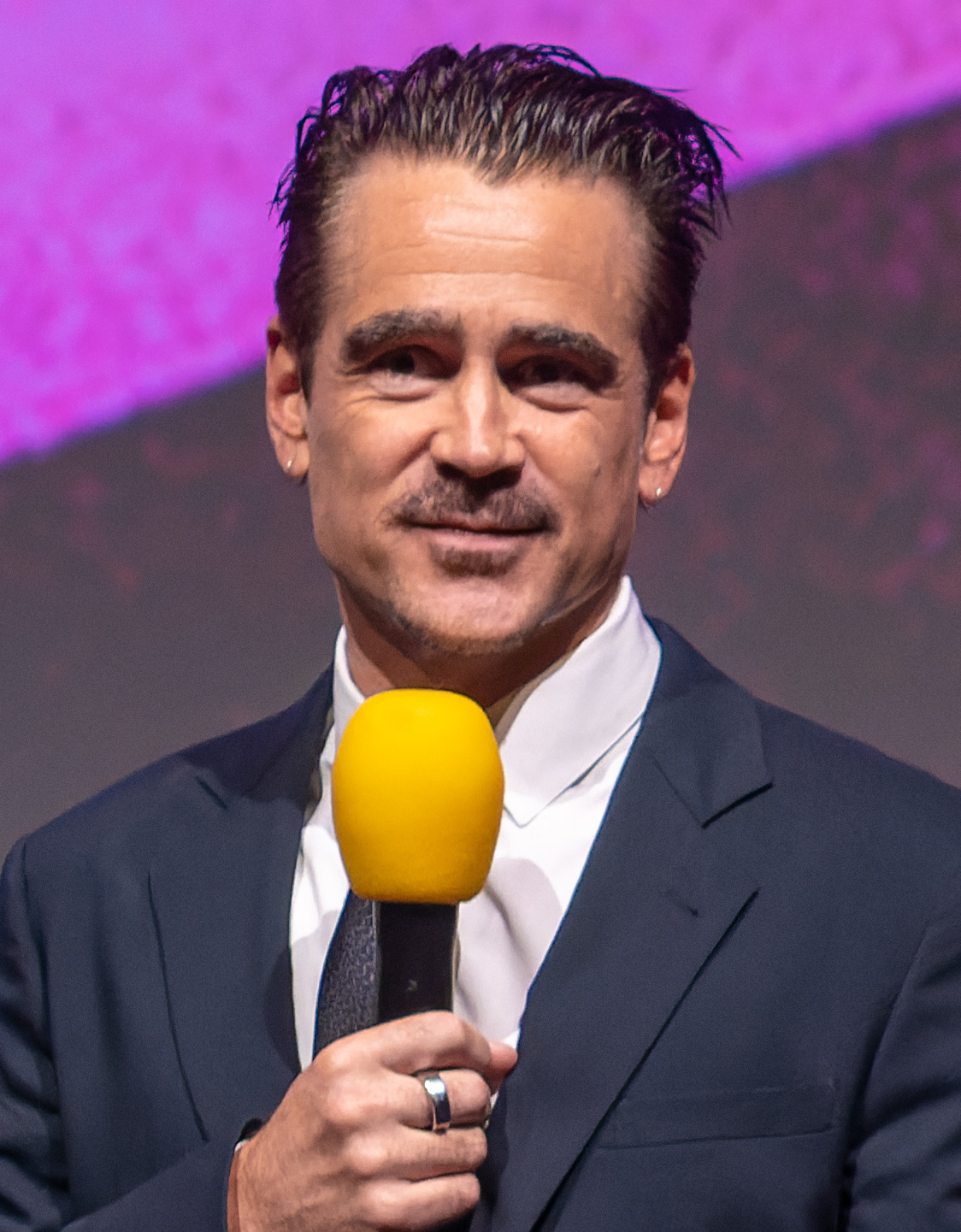
Colin Farrell, Best Actor winner

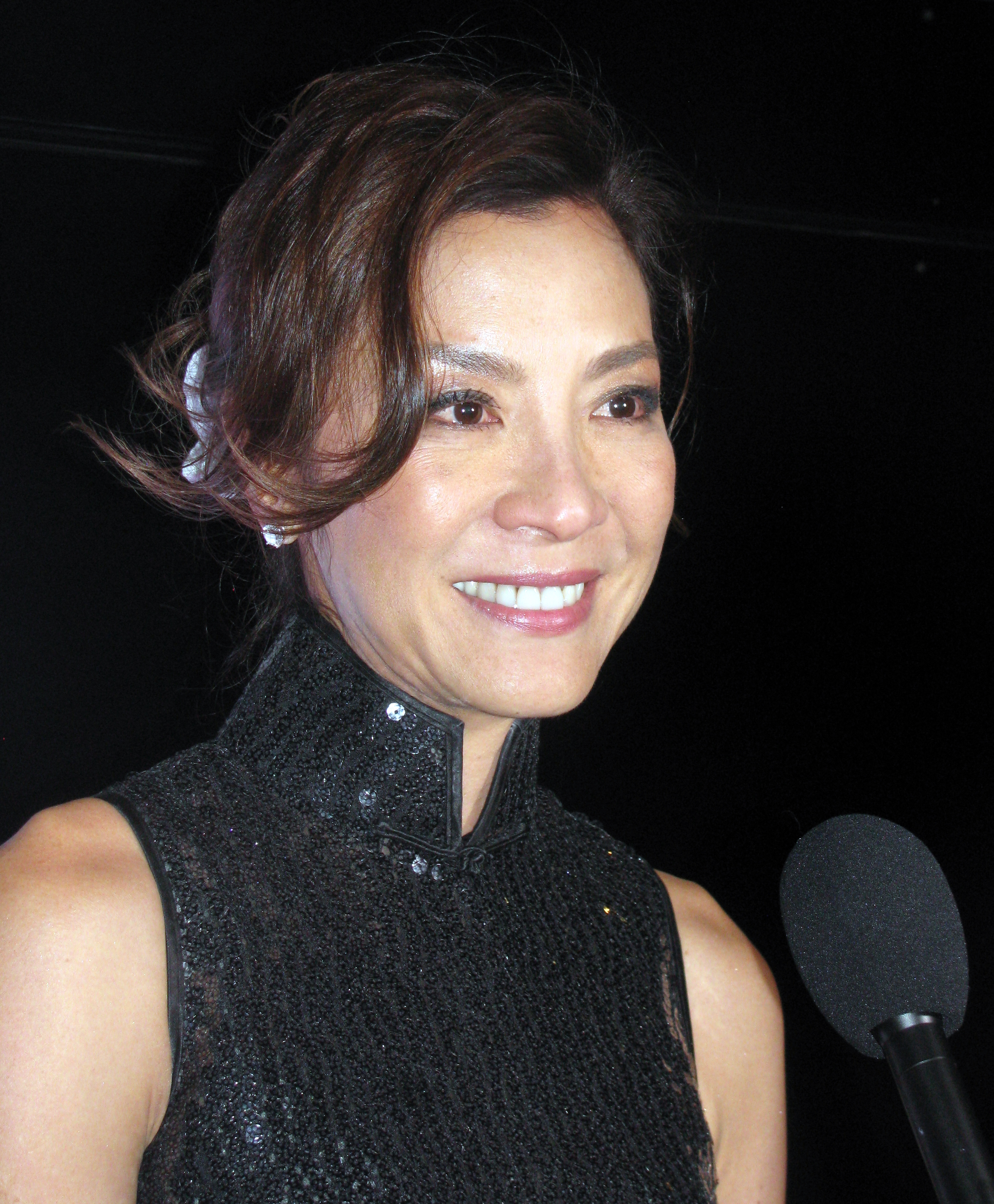
Michelle Yeoh, Best Actress winner

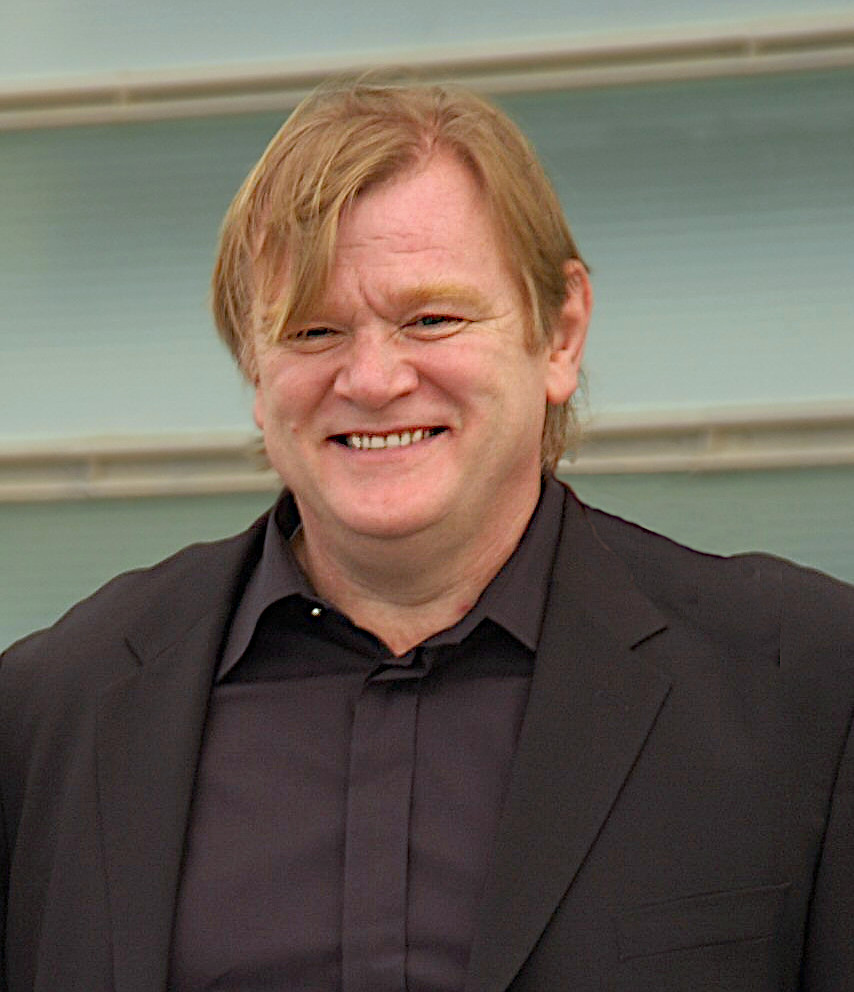
Brendan Gleeson, Best Supporting Actor winner

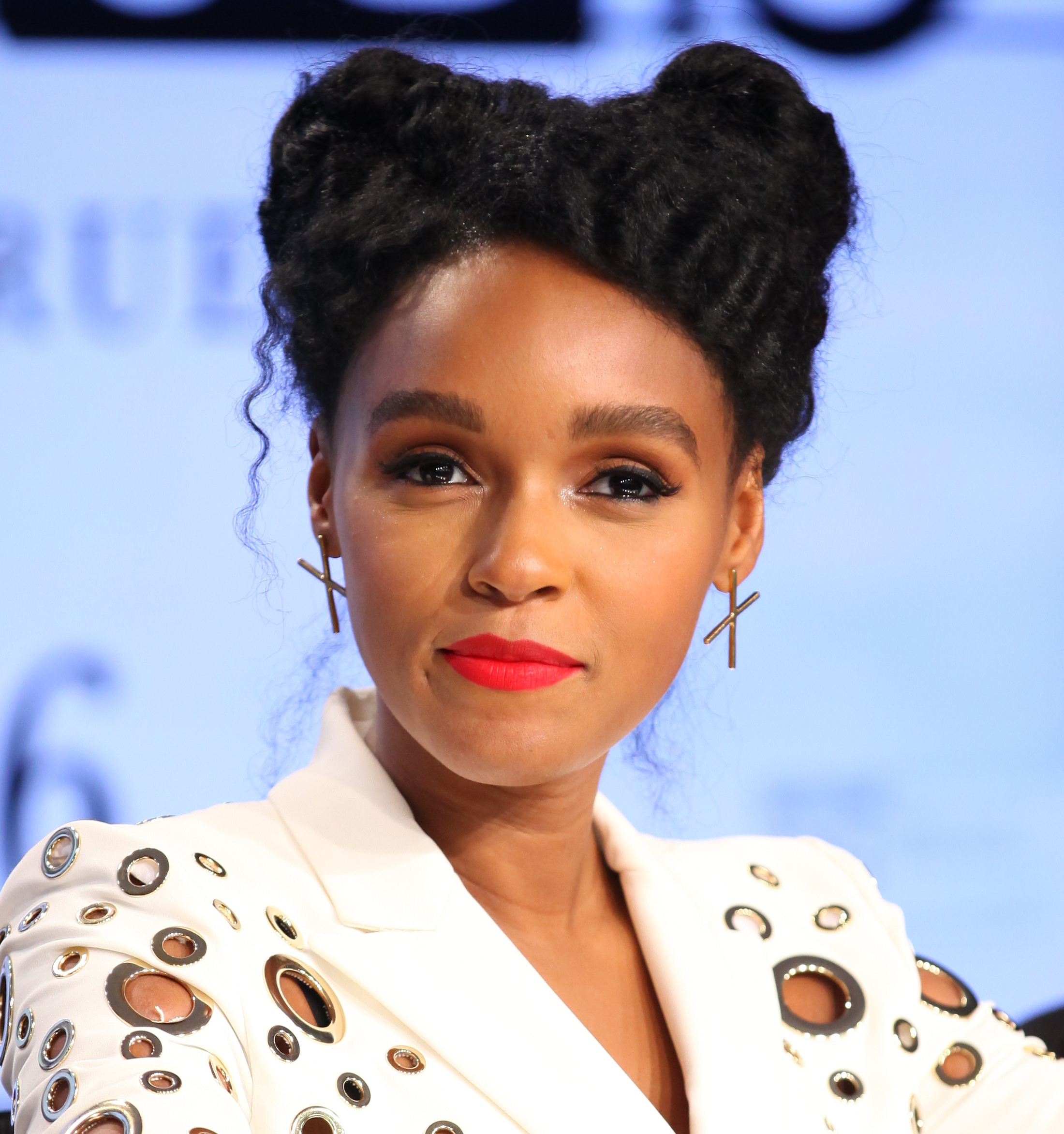
Janelle Monáe, Best Supporting winner

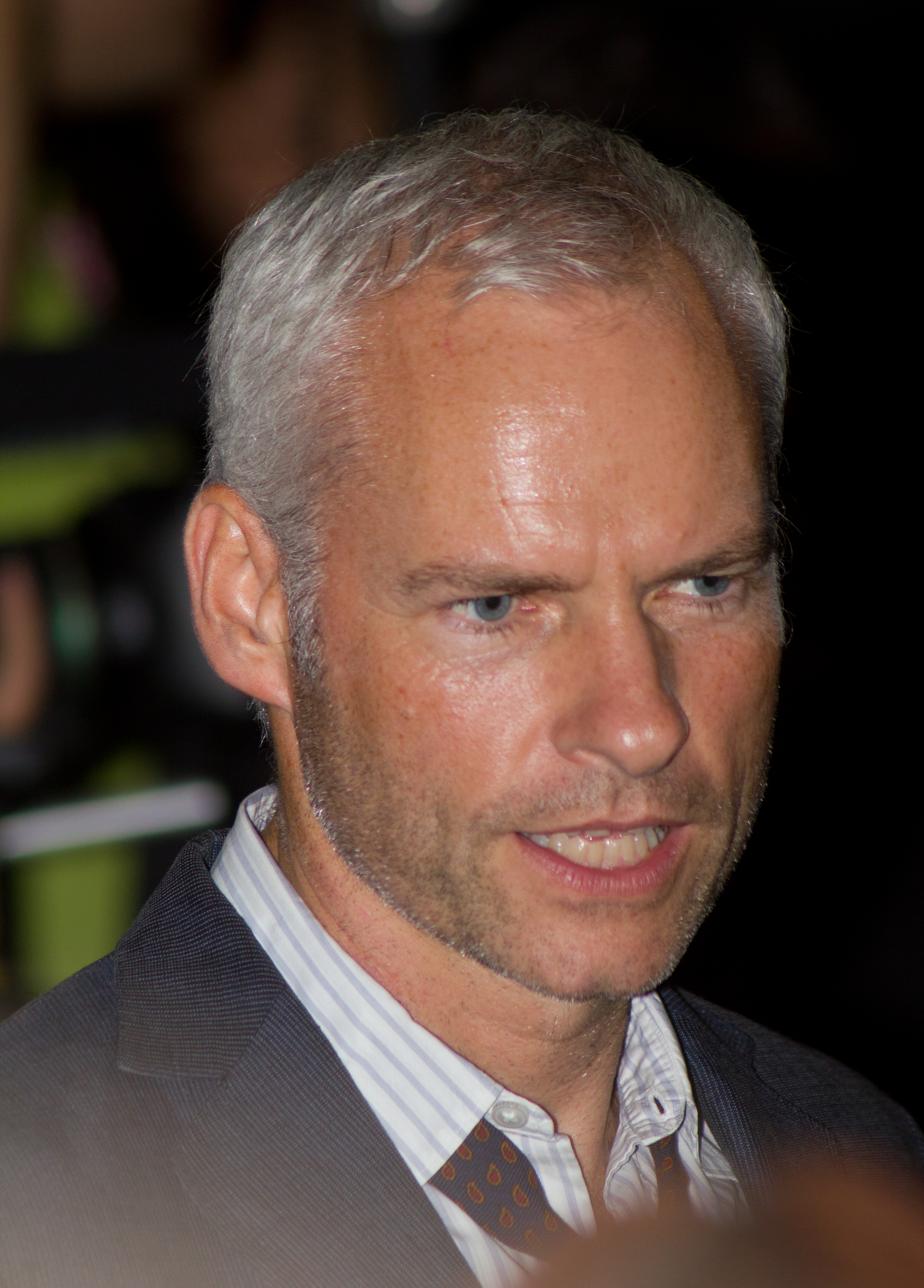
Martin McDonagh, Best Original Screenplay winner

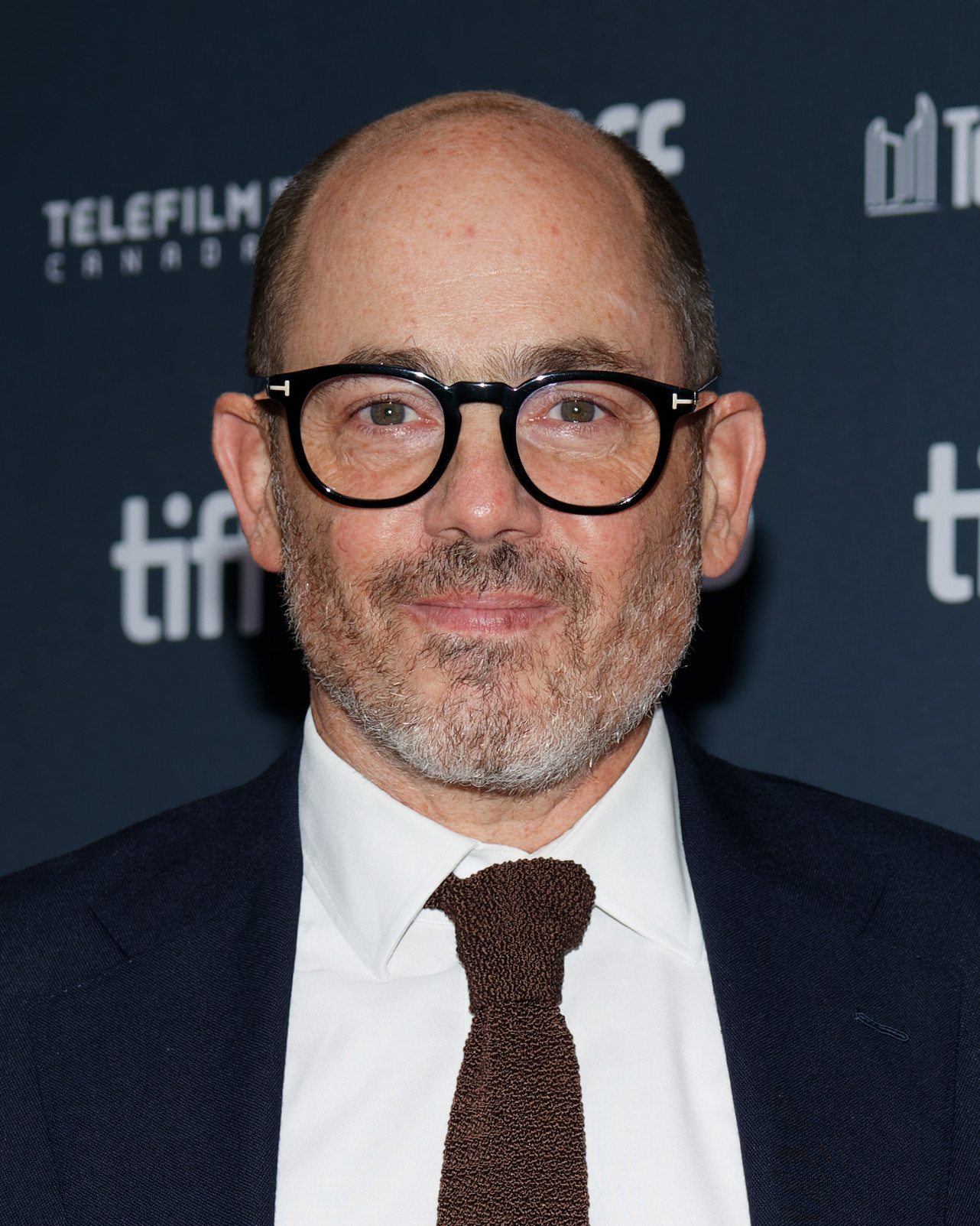
Edward Berger, Best Adapted Screenplay co-winner

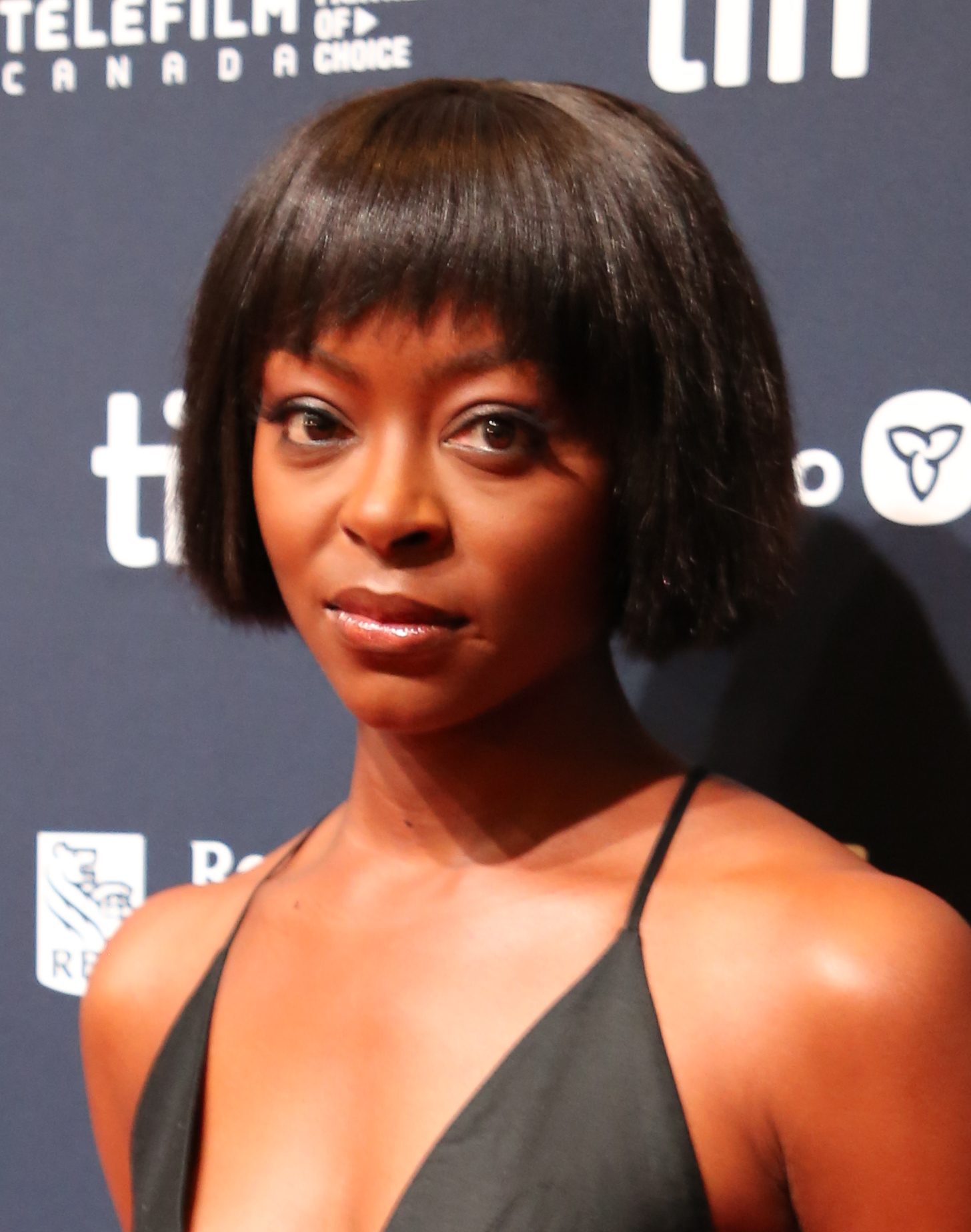
Danielle Deadwyler, Breakthrough Performance winner (tied)

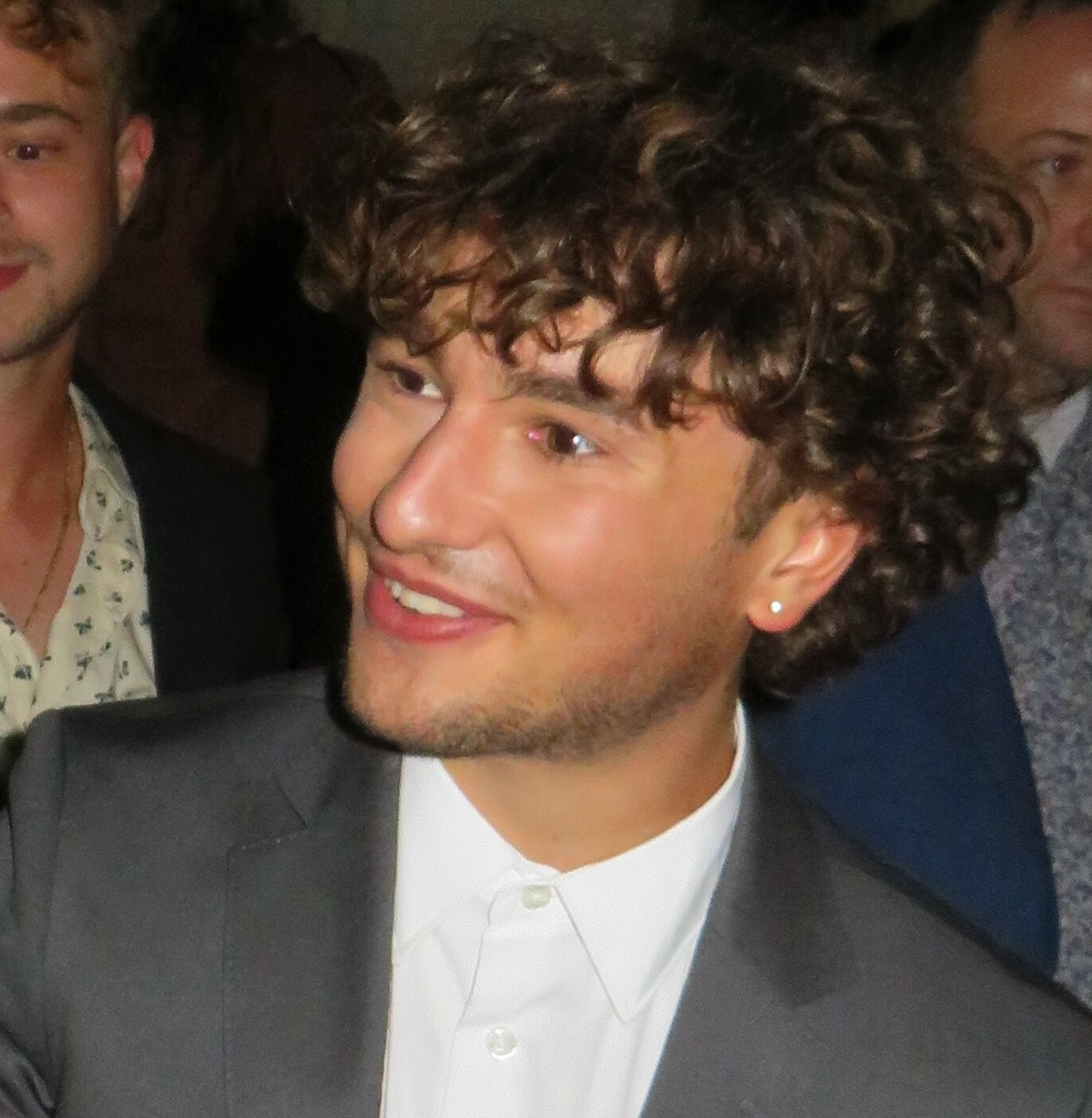
Gabriel LaBelle, Breakthrough Performance winner (tied)

== Top 10 Films ==
Films listed alphabetically except top, which is ranked as Best Film of the Year:

Top Gun: Maverick

- Aftersun
- Avatar: The Way of Water
- The Banshees of Inisherin
- Everything Everywhere All at Once
- The Fabelmans
- Glass Onion: A Knives Out Mystery
- RRR
- Till
- The Woman King
- Women Talking

== Winners ==
Best Film:

- Top Gun: Maverick

Best Director:

- Steven Spielberg – The Fabelmans

Best Actor:

- Colin Farrell – The Banshees of Inisherin

Best Actress:

- Michelle Yeoh – Everything Everywhere All at Once

Best Supporting Actor:

- Brendan Gleeson – The Banshees of Inisherin

Best Supporting Actress:

- Janelle Monáe – Glass Onion: A Knives Out Mystery

Best Original Screenplay:

- Martin McDonagh – The Banshees of Inisherin

Best Adapted Screenplay:

- Edward Berger, Lesley Paterson, and Ian Stokell – All Quiet on the Western Front

Best Animated Feature:

- Marcel the Shell with Shoes On

Best International Film:

- Close

Best Documentary:

- "Sr."

Best Ensemble:

- Women Talking

Breakthrough Performance (TIE):

- Danielle Deadwyler – Till
- Gabriel LaBelle – The Fabelmans

Best Directorial Debut:

- Charlotte Wells – Aftersun

Outstanding Achievement in Cinematography:

- Claudio Miranda – Top Gun: Maverick

NBR Freedom of Expression:

- All the Beauty and the Bloodshed
- Argentina, 1985

== Top 5 International Films ==
Close

- All Quiet on the Western Front
- Argentina, 1985
- Decision to Leave
- EO
- Saint Omer

== Top 5 Documentaries ==
"Sr."

- All the Beauty and the Bloodshed
- All That Breathes
- Descendant
- Turn Every Page
- Wildcat

== Top 10 Independent Films ==
- Armageddon Time
- Emily the Criminal
- The Eternal Daughter
- Funny Pages
- The Inspection
- Living
- A Love Song
- Nanny
- To Leslie
- The Wonder
