= When You Finish Saving the World =

2020 audio drama by Jesse Eisenberg

- Author: Jesse Eisenberg
- Genre: Drama
- Publication date: August 4, 2020
- Media type: Audible

When You Finish Saving the World is an Audible Original audio first production audio drama published on August 4, 2020 by American actor, author, and playwright Jesse Eisenberg. It won the 2021 Audie Award for "Original Work".

== Plot ==
When You Finish Saving the World tells the story of three individuals working to understand each other and themselves: Nathan, a father learning to connect with his newborn son; Rachel, a young college student seeking to find her place in a relationship and in life, before marriage to Nathan; and Ziggy, their son, a teenager hoping to figure out where he came from, and where he is headed. The shifts between time frames in these characters' lives span over thirty years and depicts the complexities of growing up, having children, and fitting in.

== Characters ==
- Jesse Eisenberg as Nathan Katz
- Finn Wolfhard as Ziggy Katz
- Kaitlyn Dever as Rachel Katz

== Adaptations ==
When You Finish Saving the World is a 2022 film adaptation based on the audiobook directed and written by Jesse Eisenberg, starring Julianne Moore and Finn Wolfhard, and produced by Moore, Emma Stone and Dave McCary.

== Awards and honors ==
Year	Award	Category	Result	Ref.
2021	Audie Award	Original Work	Won	
