= When You Finish Saving the World (film) =

2022 film by Jesse Eisenberg

- Theatrical release poster
- Directed by: Jesse Eisenberg
- Screenplay by: Jesse Eisenberg
- Based on: When You Finish Saving the World by Jesse Eisenberg
- Produced by: Dave McCary; Emma Stone; Ali Herting
- Starring: Julianne Moore; Finn Wolfhard; Jay O. Sanders; Alisha Boe; Billy Bryk; Eleonore Hendricks
- Cinematography: Benjamin Loeb
- Edited by: Sara Shaw
- Music by: Emile Mosseri
- Production companies: A24; Fruit Tree
- Distributed by: A24
- Release dates: January 18, 2022 (Sundance); January 20, 2023 (United States)
- Running time: 88 minutes
- Country: United States
- Language: English
- Box office: $196,920

When You Finish Saving the World is a 2022 American comedy-drama film written and directed by Jesse Eisenberg in his feature directorial debut. The film is based on Eisenberg's 2020 audio drama of the same name. Julianne Moore and Finn Wolfhard star as a mother and son who navigate their contentious relationship while trying to connect with other people. Jay O. Sanders, Alisha Boe, Billy Bryk, and Eleonore Hendricks also star. The film premiered at the 2022 Sundance Film Festival and was released by A24 in the United States on January 20, 2023, to generally positive reviews.

== Plot ==
Indiana loner 15-year-old Ziggy Katz is a high school student who performs original folk-rock songs for an adoring online fan base. This concept mystifies his formal and uptight mother, Evelyn, who runs a shelter for domestic abuse survivors. Evelyn, feeling distant from her son, tries to convince him to come with her and volunteer at the shelter. He declines, choosing the profitable option of live-streaming.

Ziggy seeks to connect with his crush Lila, an activist classmate of his, and goes to a local political arts festival after school to get closer to her. There, she tells him he can use his platform for awareness of current issues and reads a poem about the colonization of the Marshall Islands, which he compliments and borrows from her. Simultaneously, Evelyn meets Kyle, a 17-year-old who's staying with his mother at the shelter after he called the police to help get her out of an abusive home. Evelyn is impressed by his kindness and offers him to volunteer and get him a scholarship for Oberlin College in Ohio, with Kyle having reluctance over going to college in favor of working at his father's auto shop. That night, Ziggy's father, Roger, confronts the two for missing his awards ceremony at work, calling them both narcissists.

The next morning, Ziggy asks his mother to give him a ride to school, and inquires how he can learn to "be political" to impress Lila, and she scoffs, saying he doesn't really care about the causes. Evelyn later takes Kyle to volunteer jobs around the city, and the two become close with Evelyn growing increasingly motherly around him. Meanwhile, Ziggy and Evelyn's tensions continue to erupt.

Ziggy sets Lila's poem to song, and plays it for her one afternoon. That night, after Ziggy refuses to eat dinner in order to live stream, Evelyn secretly takes his uneaten dinner to give to Kyle at the shelter, who declines it as he already had supper earlier.

The next morning Kyle's mother confronts Evelyn, telling her to stop pressuring Kyle to go to Oberlin College as he is set to working at his dad's auto shop. Baffled, Evelyn calls for Kyle while he's in school, who confirms his stance. Around the same time, Ziggy shares to Lila that he played the song on his stream, bragging that he brought attention to the issue while still making profit, much to Lila's discontent. That afternoon, Ziggy visits the shelter while his mom watches his old videos, before noticing him nearby and meeting face-to-face.

== Cast ==
- Julianne Moore as Evelyn
- Finn Wolfhard as Ziggy
- Billy Bryk as Kyle
- Alisha Boe as Lila
- Jack Justice as Jackie
- Jay O. Sanders as Roger
- Eleonore Hendricks as Angie
- Catherine Haun as Cath
- Annacheska Brown as Cyril
- Sara Anne as Becky

== Production ==
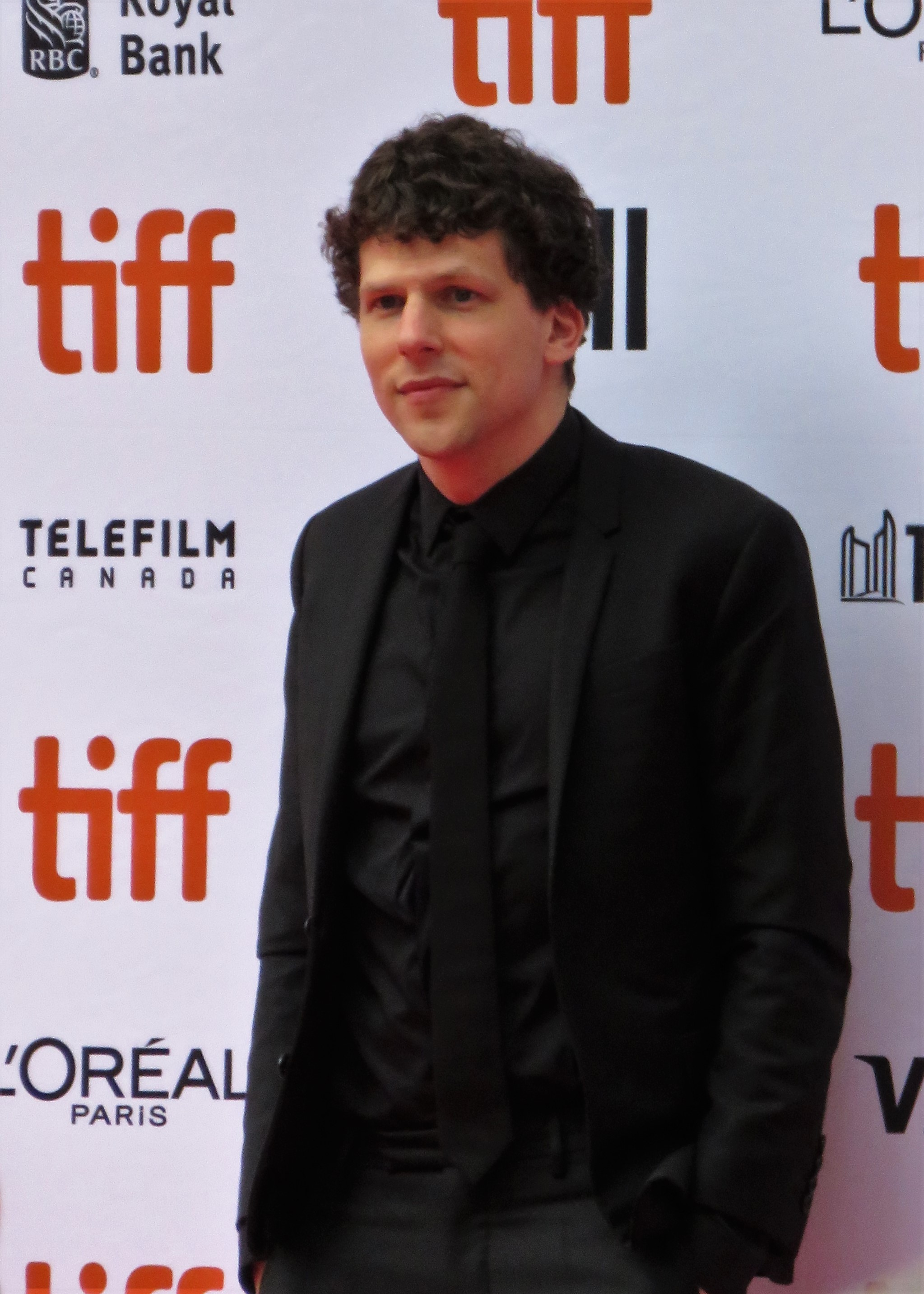
When You Finish Saving the World is the directorial debut of Jesse Eisenberg.

On April 9, 2020, Jesse Eisenberg, Finn Wolfhard, and Kaitlyn Dever were cast in the Audible Original When You Finish Saving the World, written by Eisenberg. The story was told from the perspective of three family members, at different stages of their lives, with the audio drama released on August 4, 2020.

Additionally, the audiobook was planned to be adapted into a comedy-drama movie, When You Finish Saving the World, with Julianne Moore and Wolfhard set to star as mother and son, directed and written by Eisenberg with Moore, Emma Stone and Dave McCary producing under their Fruit Tree production banner. The film adaptation was to take place in the present day and focus on the mother and son relationship, while keeping other details the same, such as Ziggy's mother running a shelter for victims of domestic violence, which she does in the audio version as well.

In August 2020, it was announced that A24 was set to finance, produce and distribute the film. It marks Eisenberg's feature film directorial debut. Moore and Wolfhard were confirmed as cast as mother and son, respectively, in April 2020. Billy Bryk, in December 2020, and Alisha Boe, in January 2021, joined the cast in undisclosed roles. In November 2020, pre-production took place in Albuquerque, New Mexico, while production began in January 2021, followed by principal photography in February 2021. Filming concluded in March 2021.

== Release ==
The film premiered at the Sundance Film Festival on January 18, 2022. Its first trailer was released on November 29, 2022. The film was released in limited theaters and on VOD in the United States on January 20, 2023. The film had its streaming debut on Netflix in the US on March 28, 2024.

== Reception ==
On the review aggregator website Rotten Tomatoes, 62% of 156 critics' reviews are positive. The website's consensus reads: "Its characters may be hard to take, but When You Finish Saving the World makes some cogent sociopolitical points." Metacritic, which uses a weighted average, assigned the film a score of 61 out of 100, based on 34 critics, indicating "generally favorable" reviews.

Anthony Lane of The New Yorker wrote "Twitching with the same unease that characterizes his performances, Eisenberg’s directorial début is taut with unhappiness but allows itself to be funny." Stephanie Zacharek of Time wrote "Eisenberg is a thoughtful filmmaker, devoted to showing his characters as multi-dimensional, flawed human beings. This is a modest film, but not a superficial one." Amy Nicholson of Variety wrote "Eisenberg has made a satire that exists in shades of beige". David Ehrlich of IndieWire wrote "Eisenberg's first movie behind the camera splits the difference between Noah Baumbach and Miranda July in a way that still allows his own voice to break through."

In contrast, Benjamin Lee of The Guardian wrote, "As a first-time director, Eisenberg is at least refreshingly restrained and gimmick-avoidant (this does not look like an A24-funded debut movie), but as a writer with some experience, albeit on stage and on the page, it feels a little anemic." Robert Adele of Los Angeles Times wrote "As a micro case study about some acutely flawed 21st century strivers, When You Finish Saving the World has its well-turned moments, but when you want it to be gloriously messy about families and human interactions, it stays resolutely in lab mode." Jeannette Catsoulis of The New York Times summarized "Eisenberg has already proven himself a smart wordsmith and a knowing performer of emotional unease, but this World is a disappointingly shallow tale of narcissism and negligence." Steve Pond of TheWrap reviewed "In its original, radio-drama form, the story played out over five hours and was much more expansive; trimmed down to less than 90 minutes on film, it feels like a short story, compact and uncomfortable and ultimately satisfying."
