= Finn Wolfhard =

Canadian actor and musician (born 2002)

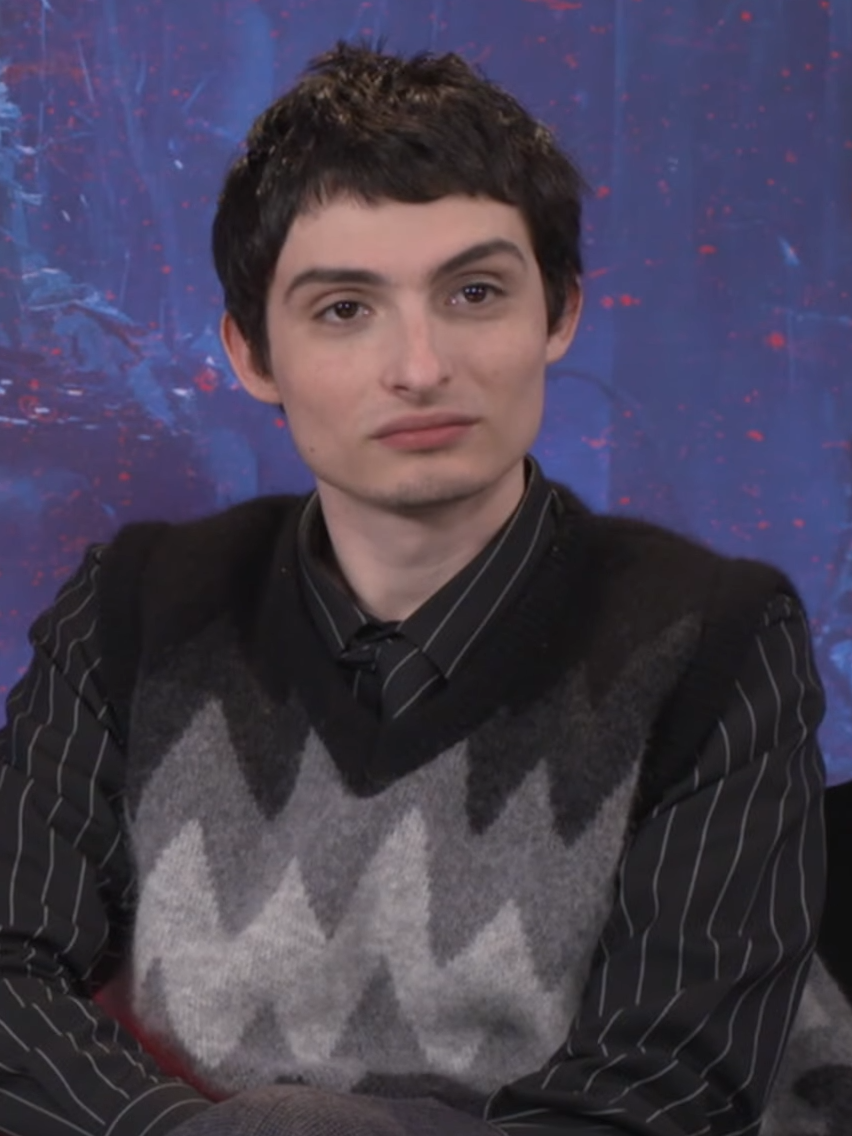
- Wolfhard in 2025
- Born: Finn Michael Wolfhard; December 23, 2002 (age 23); Vancouver, British Columbia, Canada
- Occupations: Actor; musician; director
- Years active: 2012–present
- Musical career
- Genres: Alternative rock; indie rock
- Instruments: Vocals; guitar; piano; bass
- Years active: 2018–present
- Labels: AWAL; Royal Mountain; paradYse; Transgressive
- Member of: The Aubreys
- Formerly of: Calpurnia
- Website: www.finnwolfhardmusic.com

Finn Michael Wolfhard (born December 23, 2002) is a Canadian actor, musician, model and film director. He received international attention for playing Mike Wheeler on the Netflix series Stranger Things (2016–2025). He also played Richie Tozier in the horror film It (2017) and the sequel It Chapter Two (2019), and Trevor Spengler in the supernatural comedy Ghostbusters: Afterlife (2021) and its sequel Ghostbusters: Frozen Empire (2024).

Wolfhard has also directed the comedy short film Night Shifts (2020) and the comedy horror film Hell of a Summer (2023). As a musician, he was the lead vocalist and guitarist for the rock band Calpurnia, and has been a member of The Aubreys since 2020, in addition to his solo work.

== Early life ==
Finn Michael Wolfhard was born on December 23, 2002, in Vancouver, British Columbia, to a family of French and German descent with Jewish heritage. He attended Catholic school. His father, Eric Wolfhard, is a researcher on Indigenous land claims in Canada. He has an older brother, actor Nick Wolfhard.

== Acting career ==
=== 2012–2016: Early roles and breakthrough with Stranger Things ===
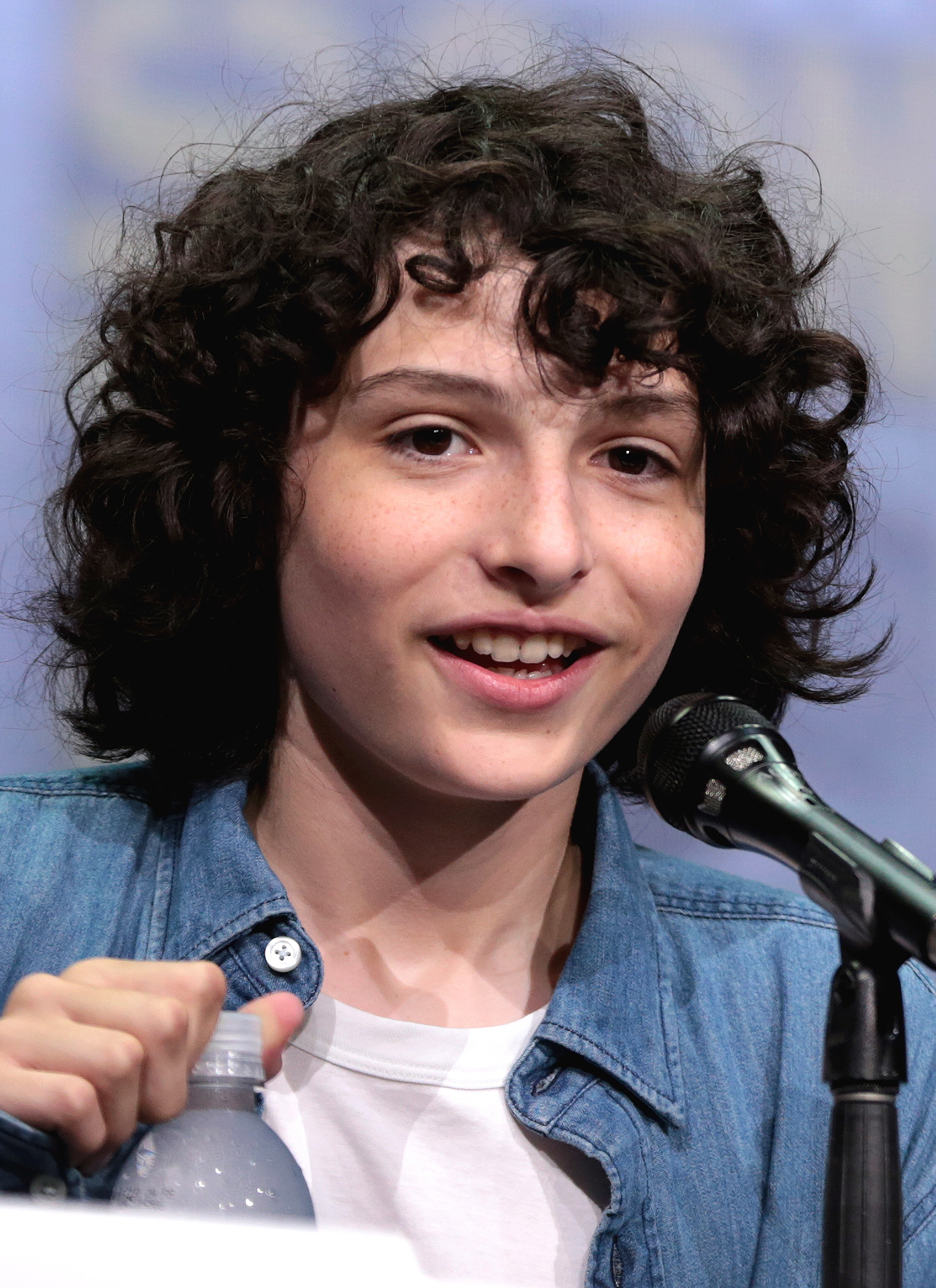
Wolfhard in 2017

Wolfhard's first acting role was in the 2012 music video for the song "Retro Oceans" by Vancouver band Facts. In 2014, he made his television debut as Zoran in the second season of the post-apocalyptic science fiction series The 100. The following year, he appeared as Jordie Pinsky in the series Supernatural.

In 2016, Wolfhard began portraying Mike Wheeler in the Netflix series Stranger Things. He auditioned for the role via video after seeing an open casting call. Wolfhard, along with his castmates, won a SAG Award for Outstanding Performance by an Ensemble in a Drama Series. He and co-stars Noah Schnapp, Gaten Matarazzo, and Caleb McLaughlin competed against one another in a 2017 episode of Spike's Lip Sync Battle.

=== 2017–2021: Further success and recognition ===
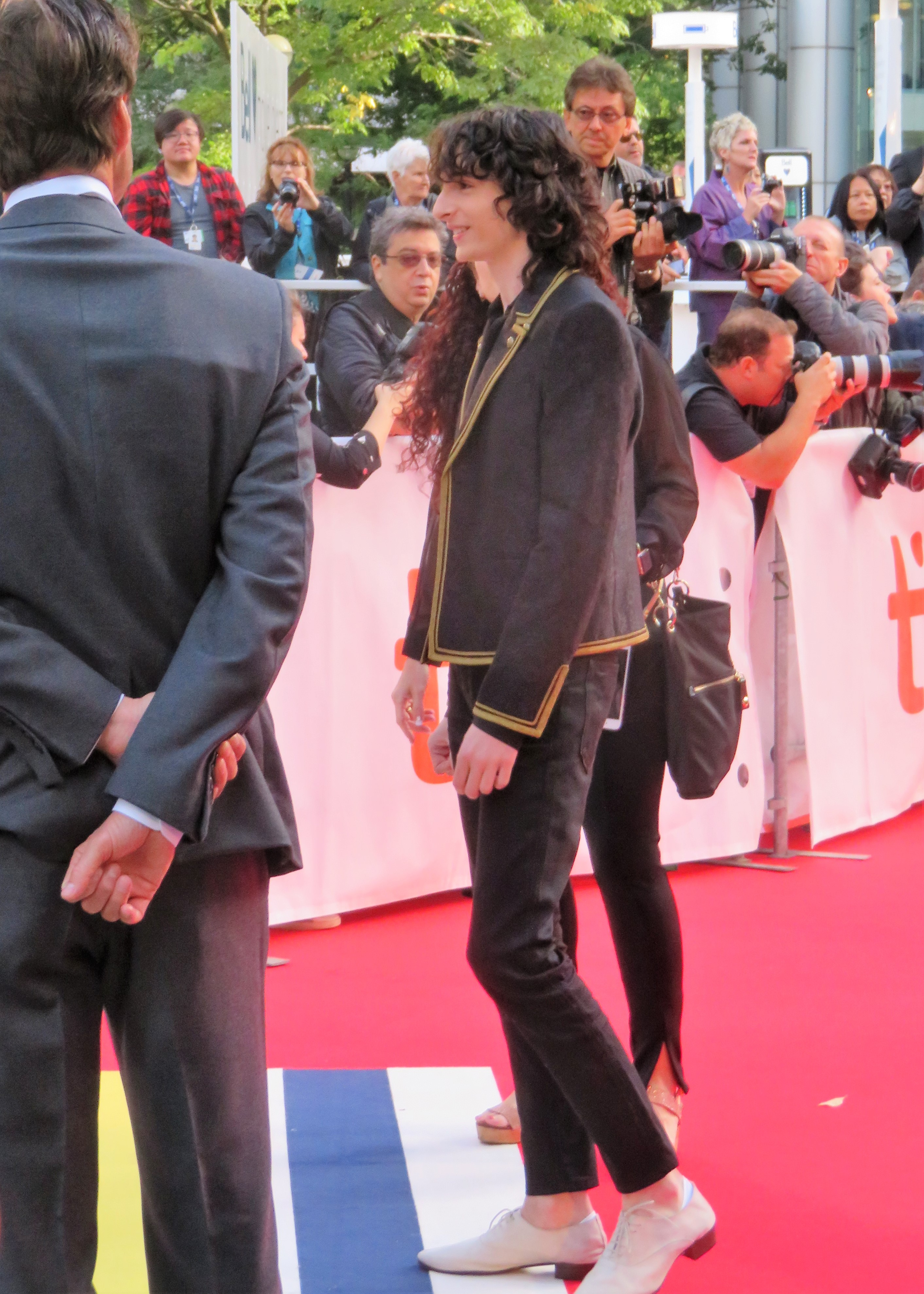
Wolfhard at the 2019 Toronto International Film Festival

In July 2017, Wolfhard co-directed his first music video with Josh Ovalle for the band Spendtime Palace's song "Sonora". Wolfhard made his feature film debut playing Richie Tozier in the 2017 film adaptation of Stephen King's It. The casting of Wolfhard in both Stranger Things and It, both set in the 1980s, had been a coincidence. According to Wolfhard, he had been initially cast as Richie when Cary Fukunaga was attached as director and co-writer, but when Fukunaga left the project over creative differences, the role fell through which allowed him to pursue Stranger Things. Once Andy Muschietti became attached to It, Wolfhard had to re-audition for the role of Richie.

In October 2017, Wolfhard parted ways with his former agency, APA, and fired former agent Tyler Grasham following allegations that Grasham had sexually assaulted aspiring young male actors. Wolfhard himself had not been assaulted. In January 2018, Wolfhard signed with Creative Artists Agency. He starred in the 2018 film Dog Days.

In January 2019, Wolfhard starred in the Netflix animated series Carmen Sandiego as "Player", the title character's chief accomplice and friend. In May, he made his modeling debut in Saint Laurent's Fall/Winter '19 campaign. He reprised his role as young Richie in flashbacks for the sequel It Chapter Two (2019), and co-starred in The Goldfinch (2019), the John Crowley-directed adaptation of Donna Tartt's novel, playing Young Boris Pavlikovsky, a Ukrainian student and troublemaker. Wolfhard had not been Crowley's first choice as he wanted to cast an authentic Russian actor for Boris, but Wolfhard's near perfect Russian accent in his audition helped him get the role. Wolfhard also provided the voice of Pugsley Addams in an animated remake of The Addams Family. From 2017 to 2019, he was listed in Variety's Hollywood Youth Impact Report. In 2018 and 2019, The Hollywood Reporter named him as one of the top 30 stars under age 18.

In January 2020, Wolfhard portrayed Miles in the supernatural horror film The Turning, an adaptation of Henry James' novella The Turn of the Screw, and co-starred in the anthology film Omniboat: A Fast Boat Fantasia (2020). Wolfhard then starred in the Jeremy Schaulin-Rioux–directed short film, Rules for Werewolves (2020), based on playwright and novelist Kirk Lynn's adapted screenplay from his debut novel, which is set to become a feature-length film with Wolfhard attached to star.

He lent his voice to two Adult Swim productions: the animated series, Smiling Friends and the animated series JJ Villard's Fairy Tales as Boypunzel, a gender-swapped version of Rapunzel. Wolfhard joined the Jason Reitman–directed comedy miniseries Home Movie: The Princess Bride, which raised money for World Central Kitchen, and performed a live reading of The Princess Bride's script, as the Grandson, for a charity event in September 2020.

At the age of 17, Wolfhard made his directorial debut with the comedy short film, Night Shifts (2020). He released the film on YouTube the following year. Wolfhard co-starred in the Audible Original, When You Finish Saving the World (2020), written by Jesse Eisenberg. He narrates Ziggy Katz, a 15-year-old boy recording audio sessions to a futuristic bot therapist. The audiobook was adapted by Eisenberg into the comedy-drama film When You Finish Saving the World (2022), with Julianne Moore and Wolfhard starring as mother and son. In July 2020, it was announced that Wolfhard and his brother Nick would be headlining the voice cast of sci-fi animated series NEW-GEN, playing twin brothers. Wolfhard was included in Forbes 30 Under 30 class of 2020 in the field of Hollywood and entertainment.

Wolfhard co-starred with Carrie Coon in Jason Reitman's Ghostbusters: Afterlife (2021), playing the son of Coon's single mother. He was cast alongside Willem Dafoe, Emily Watson, and Helena Zengel in A24's fantasy epic The Legend of Ochi, directed by Isaiah Saxon. In November 2021, he announced that he is working on directing a feature-length film, Hell of a Summer. In 2022, Wolfhard joined Guillermo del Toro's stop-motion animated musical film Pinocchio.

=== 2022–present ===
In 2023, Wolfhard and his friend and frequent collaborator Billy Bryk released the theatrical feature film Hell of a Summer, which they co-directed, co-wrote and co-starred in. The film debuted at the 2023 Toronto International Film Festival, where it was named second runner-up for the People's Choice Award for Midnight Madness. That same year, he voiced a younger version of the titular character in Scott Pilgrim Takes Off, released in November.

In October 2025, Wolfhard lent his voice in a short CGI film ParaNorman: The Thrifting during the Halloween re-release of the film, alongside Anna Kendrick. Also in October 2025, it was reported that Wolfhard was developing a biopic centered on the band The Replacements. Based on the autobiography Trouble Boys: The True Story of the Replacements, Wolfhard will co-write the screenplay with his father and also produce the film.

In November 2025, it was announced that Wolfhard would star in a film titled Crash Land alongside Gabriel LaBelle, with Dempsey Bryk directing. Bryk and Wolfhard would also serve as producers.

In July 2026, Wolfhard confirmed to a fan during a Reddit Q&A that he was writing a new screenplay for a film that he also intends to direct and score.

== Music career ==
=== 2018-2019: Calpurnia ===
Wolfhard was the lead vocalist, rhythm guitarist and songwriter for Vancouver-based rock band Calpurnia, until the band dissolved in November 2019. A few weeks later, it was announced that Wolfhard's new band, The Aubreys, with Calpurnia drummer Malcolm Craig, would debut on the soundtrack of his film, The Turning (2020).

=== 2020-present: The Aubreys and solo career ===
The Aubreys released their single, "Loved One" on March 10, 2020, and their debut EP, Soda & Pie, through AWAL, on March 13, 2020. Their next single, "Smoke Bomb" was released on August 17, 2020.

The Aubreys' first collaboration single with Lunar Vacation, "No Offerings" was released on January 12, 2021. Their second single of 2021, "Sand in My Bed" was released on February 14.

The Aubreys released their single "Karaoke Alone" on September 10, 2021, from the group's debut studio LP, Karaoke Alone, which was released on November 5, 2021.

Wolfhard released his debut studio album, Happy Birthday, on June 6, 2025, via AWAL. After Stranger Things concluded later that year, Wolfhard said in an interview with Deadline Hollywood that he would shift his focus to music. His second album, Fire from the Hip, was released on July 10, 2026.

== Advocacy ==
Wolfhard has been involved in advocacy for autism and indigenous children.

In May 2017, Wolfhard hosted "Strange 80s", a benefit concert to raise funds for Sweet Relief, an organization that helps struggling musicians in need of medical care. He also performed three tracks with his former band Calpurnia at the event. For his work with Sweet Relief, he received an award at the 2017 Television Industry Advocacy Awards.

In an interview with Variety, he revealed that he donates monthly to help those affected by the Russo-Ukrainian war.

== Personal life ==
Wolfhard has spoken publicly about his struggles with anxiety and panic attacks, which began in his mid-teens amid the pressures of fame from Stranger Things, leading him to seek therapy and embrace mental health awareness.

As of 2025, Wolfhard states that he is choosing to stay single to focus on his career, and remains private about his romantic life.

== Filmography ==
=== Film ===
Year	Title	Role	Notes	Ref.
2017	It	Richie Tozier		
2018	Dog Days	Tyler		
2018	Howard Lovecraft and the Kingdom of Madness	Herbert West (voice)		
2019	It Chapter Two	Young Richie Tozier		
2019	The Goldfinch	Young Boris Pavlikovsky		
2019	The Addams Family	Pugsley Addams (voice)		
2020	The Turning	Miles Fairchild		
2020	Omniboat: A Fast Boat Fantasia			
2020	Night Shifts	—N/a	Short film, also writer and director	
2021	How It Ends	Ezra	Cameo	
2021	Ghostbusters: Afterlife	Trevor Spengler		
2022	When You Finish Saving the World	Ziggy Katz		
2022	Guillermo del Toro's Pinocchio	Candlewick (voice)		
2023	Hell of a Summer	Chris	Also co-writer, co-director and producer	
2024	Ghostbusters: Frozen Empire	Trevor Spengler		
2024	Saturday Night	NBC page		
2025	The Legend of Ochi	Petro		
2025	ParaNorman: The Thrifting	Chad (voice)	A CG animated short film	
2026	Crash Land	Sander	Also producer	
2027	Ally †	(voice)	In-production	

Key
†	Denotes films that have not yet been released

=== Television ===
Year	Title	Role	Notes	Ref.
2014	The 100	Zoran	Episode: "Many Happy Returns"	
2015	Supernatural	Jordie Pinsky	Episode: "Thin Lizzie"	
2016–2025	Stranger Things	Mike Wheeler	Main cast	
2017	Young Math Legends	Young Gauss	Animated shorts by Flatland on VHX	
2017	Lip Sync Battle	Himself	Episode: "The Cast of Stranger Things"	
2019–2021	Carmen Sandiego	Player (voice)	Main cast	
2019–2021	Carmen Sandiego: To Steal or Not to Steal	Player (voice)	Interactive TV Special	
2020	Smiling Friends	Man Living in Wall / Bliblie (voice)	Pilot: "Desmond's Big Day Out"	
2020	JJ Villard's Fairy Tales	Boypunzel / Manpunzel (voice)	Episode: "Boypunzel"	
2020	Home Movie: The Princess Bride	Inigo Montoya	Episode: "Chapter Four: Battle Of The Wits"	
2021	Duncanville	Jeremy/Norman (voice)	Episode: "Das Banana Boot"	
2021	Matt & Bird Break Loose	Studio Receptionist	Episode: "Humans Together"	
2023	Scott Pilgrim Takes Off	Teen Scott Pilgrim (voice)	Episode: "Ramona Rents a Video"	
2025	King of the Hill	Good Hank "G.H." Hill (voice)	Episode: "No Hank Left Behind"	
2025	It: Welcome to Derry	Richie Tozier	Uncredited cameo (Episode: "Winter Fire")	
2026	Saturday Night Live	Himself (host)	Episode: "Finn Wolfhard/ASAP Rocky"	
2026	Malcolm in the Middle: Life's Still Unfair	Wayne	Cameo, Episode: "Episode Four"	

=== Web series ===
Year	Title	Role	Notes	Ref.
2017	Guest Grumps	Himself	2 episodes	
2018	Ten Minute Power Hour	Himself	Episode: "Yeti in my Spaghetti (ft. Finn Wolfhard & Jacksepticeye)"	
2019	Brawl with the Stars	Himself	Episode: "Brawl with the Stars (feat. Finn Wolfhard and Caleb McLaughlin)"	
2020	HeadGum	Himself	Episode: "Off Days: Games (w/Finn Wolfhard!)"	

== Music videos ==
Year	Artist	Title	Notes
2012	Facts	"Retro Oceans"	
2013	Hey Ocean!	"Change"	
2014	PUP	"Guilt Trip"	as Young Stefan Babcock
2014	PUP	"Sleep in the Heat"	as Young Stefan Babcock
2017	Spendtime Palace	"Sonora"	Also co-director
2018	Calpurnia	"Greyhound"	As himself (with Calpurnia)
2018	Calpurnia	"City Boy"	As himself (with Calpurnia)
2018	Ninja Sex Party	"Danny Don't You Know?"	as Young Danny Sexbang
2019	Weezer	"Take On Me"	as Young Rivers Cuomo (with Calpurnia)
2019	Calpurnia	"Cell"	As himself (with Calpurnia)
2019	Mike Tompkins	"The Addams Family Snap-Along"	as himself (and Pugsley Addams)
2020	The Aubreys	"Getting Better (Otherwise)"	as Miles Fairchild and himself (with The Aubreys)
2020	The Aubreys	"Loved One"	as himself (with The Aubreys)
2020	The Aubreys	"Smoke Bomb"	as himself (with The Aubreys)
2025	Finn Wolfhard	"Choose the Latter"	as himself
2025	Finn Wolfhard	"Trailers After Dark"	as himself
2025	Finn Wolfhard	"Objection!"	as himself
2025	George Harrison	"Give Me Love (Give Me Peace on Earth)"	as director

== Podcasts ==
Year	Title	Role	Notes	Ref.
2020	SModcast	Himself	Episode: "426: The Stranger Thing About Finn"	
2020	Review Revue	Himself	Trampoline Parks (w/ Finn Wolfhard!)	
2020	Elara Radio 25_25	Himself (co-host)	25_25 with Finn Wolfhard & Billy Bryk Ep 001	
2020	If I Were You	Himself	Telling Time (w/Finn Wolfhard and Billy Bryk!)	
2020	Lackluster Video	Himself (co-host)	10 Episodes	
2020	Review Revue	Himself	Mall Santas (w/ Finn Wolfhard and Billy Bryk!)	
2021	The Headgum Podcast	Himself	Bombard Wolfhard (w/ Finn Wolfhard & Billy Bryk!)	
2022	The A24 Podcast	Himself	Strange Adolescence with Sadie Sink & Finn Wolfhard	
2024	Off Menu with Ed Gamble and James Acaster	Himself	Episode: "236: Finn Wolfhard"	

== Audiobooks ==
Year	Title	Role	Author	Notes	Ref.
2020	When You Finish Saving the World	Ziggy Katz	Jesse Eisenberg	An Audible Original	

== Discography ==
=== Albums ===
Title	Details
Happy Birthday	Release: June 6, 2025; Label: Night Shift, AWAL; Format: Digital download, streaming
Fire from the Hip	Release: July 10, 2026; Label: Night Shift, AWAL; Format: Digital download, streaming

With the Aubreys

Title	Details
Karaoke Alone	Release: November 5, 2021; Label: AWAL (US/CA/UK/EU); Format: Digital download, streaming

With Calpurnia

Title	Details
Scout	Release: June 15, 2018; Label: Royal Mountains Record(US/CA/UK/EU); Format: Digital download, streaming

=== Extended plays ===
With the Aubreys

Title	Details
Soda & Pie	Release: March 13, 2020; Label: AWAL (US/CA/UK/EU); Format: Digital download, streaming

=== Singles ===
With Calpurnia

- "Cell" (2019)
- "Wasting time" (2018)
- "Greyhound" (2018)
- "Louie" (2018)

With the Aubreys

- "Getting Better (Otherwise)" (2020)
- "Loved One" (2020)
- "Smoke Bomb" (2020)
- "No Offerings" (with Lunar Vacation, 2021)
- "Sand in My Bed" (2021)
- "Karoke Alone" (2021)
- "Resale" (2021)
- "Kato" (2023)
- "Running" (2023)

As a solo artist

- "Choose the Latter" (2025)
- ”Trailers after dark” (2025)
- ”Objection!” (2025)
- ”I’ll Let You Finish” (2026)

=== Soundtrack ===
- When You Finish Saving the World (soundtrack), two songs as Ziggy

== Accolades ==
Year	Award	Category	Nominated work	Result	Ref.
2017	Young Artist Awards	Best Performance in a Digital TV Series or Film – Teen Actor	Stranger Things	Nominated	
2017	Teen Choice Awards	Choice Breakout TV Star	Stranger Things	Nominated	
2017	Screen Actors Guild Awards	Outstanding Performance by an Ensemble in a Drama Series	Stranger Things	Won	
2018	Screen Actors Guild Awards	Outstanding Performance by an Ensemble in a Drama Series	Stranger Things	Nominated	
2018	MTV Movie & TV Awards	Best Kiss (with Millie Bobby Brown)	Stranger Things	Nominated	
2018	MTV Movie & TV Awards	Best On-Screen Team (with Sophia Lillis, Jaeden Lieberher, Jack Dylan Grazer, Wyatt Oleff, Jeremy Ray Taylor and Chosen Jacobs)	It	Won	
2018	MTV Movie & TV Awards	Best On-Screen Team (with Gaten Matarazzo, Caleb McLaughlin, Noah Schnapp and Sadie Sink)	Stranger Things	Nominated	
2018	Teen Choice Awards	Choice Sci-Fi/Fantasy TV Actor	Stranger Things	Nominated	
2018	Teen Choice Awards	Choice Liplock (with Millie Bobby Brown)	Stranger Things	Nominated	
2018	Teen Choice Awards	Choice TV Ship (with Millie Bobby Brown)	Stranger Things	Nominated	
2019	Teen Choice Awards	Choice Summer TV Actor	Stranger Things	Nominated	
2019	People's Choice Awards	The Male TV Star of 2019	Stranger Things	Nominated	
2020	Screen Actors Guild Awards	Outstanding Performance by an Ensemble in a Drama Series	Stranger Things	Nominated	
2020	Atlanta Shortfest Awards	Best Director	Night Shifts	Won	
2021	Nickelodeon Kids' Choice Awards	Favorite Male TV Star	Stranger Things	Nominated	
2022	Saturn Awards	Best Performance by a Younger Actor in a Film	Ghostbusters: Afterlife	Won	
2023	Kids' Choice Awards	Favorite Male TV Star (Family)	Stranger Things	Won	
