= Lifeguard (band) =

American indie rock band

- Origin: Chicago, Illinois, United States
- Genres: Art rock; post-hardcore; noise rock; experimental rock; post-punk
- Years active: 2019–present
- Labels: Matador Records
- Members: Asher Case; Isaac Lowenstein; Kai Slater

Lifeguard is an American indie rock band from Chicago, Illinois. The band is currently signed to Matador Records.

== History ==
Formed in 2019, Lifeguard consists of bassist and vocalist Asher Case, drummer and percussionist Isaac Lowenstein, and guitarist and vocalist Kai Slater. Case and Lowenstein were originally in the band Horsegirl, which Lowenstein's sister is a member of. The group released their debut EP, In Silence, in 2020. The band self-released their first album, DIVE, in 2021.

The band signed to Matador Records in 2023, where they released two EPs, Crowd Can Talk and Dressed in Trenches. Crowd Can Talk was originally issued by Chicago label Born Yesterday in the summer of 2022, while Dressed in Trenches featured five previously unreleased songs. Both EPs were recorded at Chicago's Electrical Audio studio with engineer Mike Lust within a span of 12 months.

== Discography ==
=== Studio albums ===
- DIVE (2021, self-released)
- Ripped and Torn (2025, Matador Records)

=== EPs ===
- In Silence (2020, self-released)
- Crowd Can Talk (2022, Born Yesterday)
- Dressed in Trenches (2023, Matador Records)

=== Compilations ===
- Crowd Can Talk / Dressed in Trenches (2023, Matador Records)
