= Dempsey Bryk =

Canadian actor and filmmaker

- Born: August 29, 1996 (age 30); New York City, New York, U.S.
- Occupation: Actor
- Years active: 2017–present
- Parents: Greg Bryk (father); Danielle Nicholas Bryk (mother)
- Relatives: Billy Bryk (brother)

Dempsey Bryk (born August 29, 1996) is an American-Canadian actor and filmmaker. He is known for playing Wyatt McMurtry in Heartland, Airk Tanthalos in Willow, and Private 'BA' Chapman in Going Dutch.

== Early life ==
Dempsey Bryk was born on August 29, 1996 to actor, Greg Bryk, and interior designer, Danielle Nicholas Bryk. He has two younger siblings, Billy and Ella. As a child he appeared in his mother's home renovation shows; Building Bryks, Bryk House, and A Bryk at a Time.

He attended the University of Western Ontario's Ivey Business School for a year but left to study at the Neighborhood Playhouse School of the Theatre in New York City.

== Career ==
One of Bryk's early roles was as a recurring role on the long-running Canadian series, Heartland. He played Wyatt McMurtry, the nephew of Casey McMurtry and a romantic interest of Georgie Fleming Morris. Bryk played Thurston Polk in the 2019 web-series The Birch, created by Crypt TV for Facebook Watch.

In 2022, Bryk starred in The Fight Machine as a young boxer who ends up fighting in an illegal bare-knuckle match. His father in the movie is played by his real life father, Greg Bryk. The same year, he also played Prince Airk Tanthalos in the Willow sequel series on Disney+. His character is the son of Madmartigan and Sorsha from the original film.

In 2025, Bryk has a recurring role as Private Anthony 'BA' Chapman in the comedy series, Going Dutch, starring Denis Leary. He is also set to appear in the indie thriller, The Snare.

Crash Land, his full-length directorial debut as a filmmaker, premiered at SXSW in 2026.

== Filmography ==
Film performances
Year	Title	Role	Notes
2019	The Silence	Rob	
2020	Marlene	Steven (Young Adult)	
2022	The Fight Machine	Rob Tully	
2024	Ordinary Angels	Derek	
2025	The Snare	Marty	Also co-executive producer

Television performances
Year	Title	Role	Notes
2017	Mary Kills People	Tristan Avery	2 episodes
2017	Saving Hope	Joseph Woods	Episode: "Hope Never Dies"
2017	Black Mirror	Cal	Episode: "Arkangel"
2017–2019	Heartland	Wyatt McMurty	18 episodes
2018	Ransom	Danny Ferguson	Episode: "Legacy"
2019	Jett	Orlando	Episode: "Phoenix"
2019	Timeline	Brian	4 episodes
2019	V Wars	Brock	2 episodes
2019	The Birch	Thurston Polk	12 episodes
2021	Hudson & Rex	Marksamus Sanford	Episode: "The Art of the Steal"
2021	Coroner	Caleb Browning	3 episodes
2022	Willow	Airk Tanthalos	Main role
2025	Saint-Pierre	Tristan	Episode: "Off with his Head"
2025	Going Dutch	Private Anthony 'BA' Chapman	Recurring role
2025–present	We Were Liars	Ebon	Main role (season 2); recurring role (season 1)

Short film performances
Year	Title	Role	Director	Writer	Producer	Notes
2019	Viaticum	Ronnie Newey	No	No	No	
2020	Zane	Zane Petersen	No	Yes	No	
2021	L for Loser	-	Yes	Yes	Yes	
2021	Brief Story	Victor	No	No	No	
2021	B.S. Poetry	The Poet Boy	No	No	No	
2024	What Would Jesus Do?	-	Yes	Yes	Yes	

Stage performances
Year	Title	Role	Notes
2019	Punkplay	Duck	
2022	Fail to Prepare		also writer and director

Video game performances
Year	Title	Role	Notes
2021	Far Cry 6	John, Jacob, Ethan Double	
2021	Far Cry 6 - Joseph:Collapse	John, Jacob, Ethan Double	expansion pack
2021	Harry Potter: Magic Awakened	Harry Potter	voice
