= Brett Davis (comedian) =

American comedian

- Born: New Jersey, US
- Occupations: Comedian, actor
- Years active: 2006–present
- Television: The Special Without Brett Davis
- Website: www.brettdavis.rip

Brett Davis is an American comedian, actor, and writer. He is the creator and host of the public-access television series The Special Without Brett Davis and the podcasts The John Gentle Show and The Podcast for Laundry. A recipient of the Andy Kaufman Award in 2015, Davis was also a cast member on the rebooted National Lampoon Radio Hour and co-hosted the live comedy showcase The Macaulay Culkin Show.

== Career ==
Davis grew up in New Jersey. As a teenager, he was a frequent caller and contributor to The Best Show with Tom Scharpling and guest-hosted NYCTV's New York Noise. He also performed regularly in the New Brunswick punk scene, which became the subject of his early short film, BANANAZZZ.

Davis hosted the public access show The Special Without Brett Davis on the Manhattan Neighborhood Network, taking over the time slot previously held by The Chris Gethard Show. The show aired for over 170 episodes, with Davis playing a different character hosting a new show each week. It featured a rotating cast of performers, including Jo Firestone, Cole Escola, Joe Pera, Patti Harrison, Conner O'Malley, Sunita Mani, Ikechukwu Ufomadu, Julio Torres, John Early, Matt Rogers, Zach Cherry, Ana Fabrega, Ziwe Fumudoh, and Bridey Elliott. Guests, who were often integrated into the show's scenarios, included Gilbert Gottfried, Michael Shannon, Richard Kind, Janeane Garofalo, Lita, Rose McGowan, The Thermals, and Screaming Females.

Davis later created and hosted The Podcast for Laundry, described as "a satire of podcasting." On the show, he played a version of himself driven mad by the premise of hosting a weekly podcast about laundry. His guests included David Cross, Tim Heidecker, Jon Glaser, Rachel Sennott, Sarah Sherman, Wyatt Cenac, Kevin Corrigan, James Adomian, and Aparna Nancherla.

He performs character-based comedy throughout New York City and, in 2015, won the Andy Kaufman Award for his interactive live performances.

From 2013 to 2017, Davis and Sally Burtnick co-hosted The Macaulay Culkin Show, a monthly comedy showcase at the Shea Stadium DIY venue in East Williamsburg that included an annual summer comedy festival. Though previously unaffiliated with the actor, the show's namesake, Macaulay Culkin, made a guest appearance in 2019.

In 2019, Davis became a cast member of the rebooted National Lampoon Radio Hour alongside Cole Escola, Jo Firestone, Alex English, Maeve Higgins, and Megan Stalter.

In 2024, Davis launched the podcast The John Gentle Show. The series features his recurring character, John Gentle, a disgraced poetry professor who returns to a New Jersey community college to take over his late mentor's jazz radio show following the mentor's mysterious death. The show stars Emma Callahan as producer Eva, with guest appearances from Cole Escola, Sarah Sherman, Jon Daly, Bridey Elliott, Hayley McFarland, and Tom Scharpling as students and faculty.

== Filmography ==
=== Television ===
Year	Title	Role	Notes	Refs
2006	New York Noise	MC Steinberg	4 episodes	Website
2011	Weird Vibes	various	3 episodes	Website
2014	The Chris Gethard Show	Smith	3 episodes	
2015–2019	The Special Without Brett Davis	Host, various characters	Also creator, cable access show	
2016	Boy Band	Shane	6 episodes; also creator	
2016	Jon Glaser Loves Gear	Agent		Website
2017	Animals.	Lizard Man	2 episodes	Website
2018	The Tonight Show Starring Jimmy Fallon	Roy Orbison		Website
2018	The Late Show with Stephen Colbert	Various characters	2 episodes	Website
2018-2020	Our Cartoon President	Anderson Cooper	Voice role	
2020	National Lampoon Radio Hour	Various characters	11 episodes	
2022	The Best Show with Tom Scharpling	Various characters		
2024	The John Gentle Show	John Gentle		

=== Film ===
Year	Title	Role	Notes
2009	Steinjive	MC Steinberg	
2016	Long Nights Short Mornings	Grokkq	
2018	Clara's Ghost	Driver	
