= Martine Gutierrez =

American visual and performance artist (born 1989)

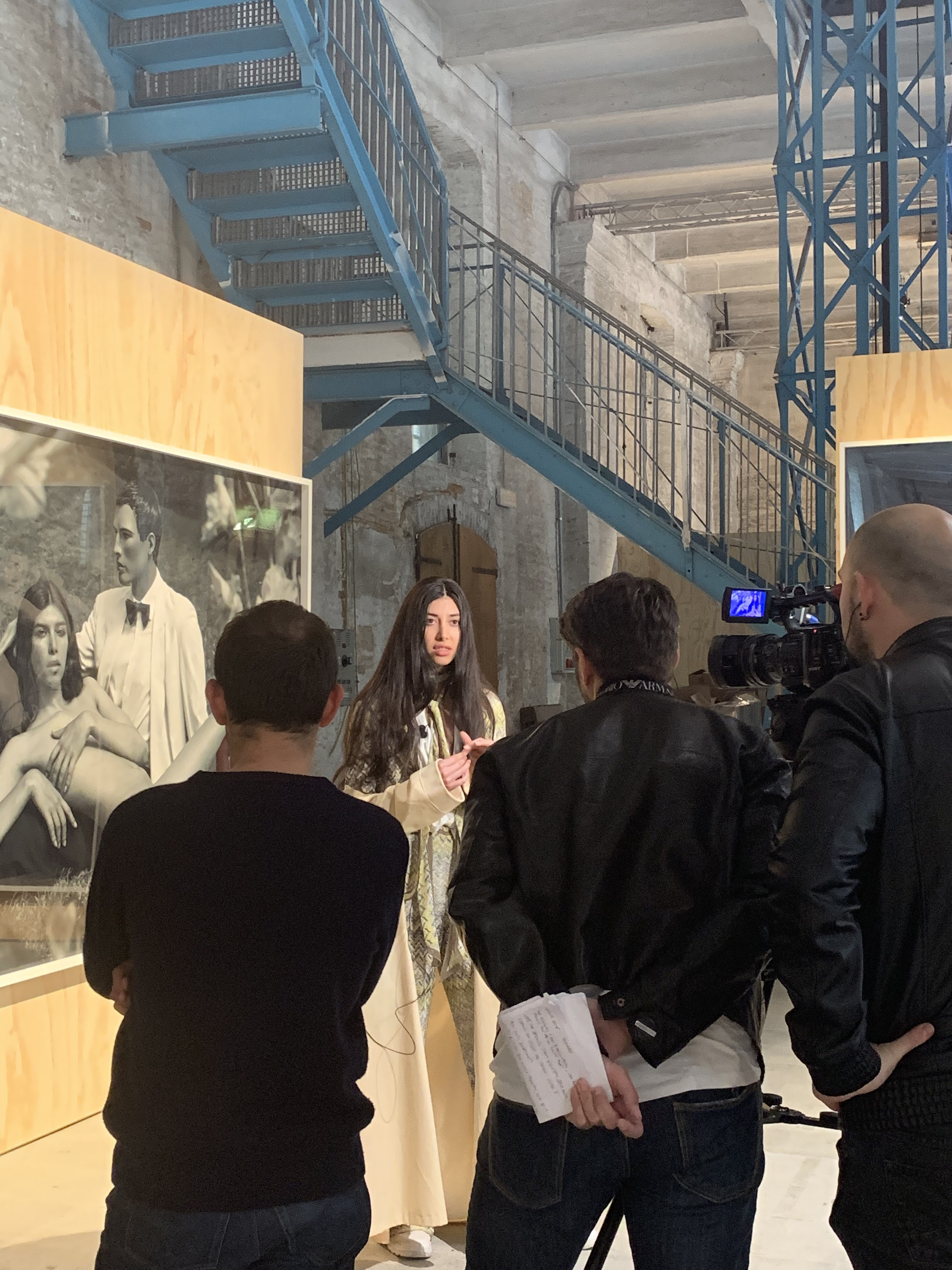
- Martine Gutierrez at the Venice Biennale
- Born: 1989 (age 36–37); Berkeley, CA
- Education: Rhode Island School of Design
- Website: www.martinegutierrez.com

Martine Gutierrez, also known by the mononym Martine (born Martín Gutierrez, 1989), is an American visual and performance artist. Her work focuses on identity, and how perception of self is formed, expressed, and perceived. She has created music videos, billboard campaigns, episodic films, photographs, live performance artworks, and a satirical fashion magazine investigating identity as both a social construct and an authentic expression of self. Martine's work has been exhibited in galleries and museums, notably the Central Pavilion at the 58th Venice Biennale. Also an actor, Martine portrays Vanesja in Fantasmas on HBO.

In 2025, Gutierrez was announced as a Guggenheim Fellow.

== Early life and education ==
Martine Gutierrez was born in 1989, in Berkeley, California, to a white American mother from upstate New York and a Guatemalan father. Raised in Oakland, California, and then later in Vermont, Martine made art from an early age. At 8 years old, Martine had her first solo exhibition at La Peña Cultural Center and sold her first artwork titled, Self-portrait, 1997.

Gutierrez received a BFA in printmaking from Rhode Island School of Design in 2012.

== Exhibitions ==
In 2013, Gutierrez had her first solo exhibition at the Ryan Lee Gallery in New York, featuring Real Dolls (2013), a series of photographs depicting her performance of four different life-size sex dolls in various domestic settings, and her multi-part film Martine Part I–X. Images from this series were shown in Disturbing Innocence, a group exhibition curated by Eric Fischl which took place at the FLAG art Foundation in 2014.

Gutierrez's Real Dolls images were also included in the 2015 exhibition About Face at Dartmouth's Hood Museum, which explored how contemporary artists have investigated identity as a culturally constructed phenomenon.

In 2014, Gutierrez created the photographic series Lineups, in which she is dressed and posed to blend seamlessly with groups of glamorous female mannequins staged in highly stylized tableaux. Miss Rosen, who interviewed Martine about LineUps, wrote, "Martine embodies some of the most seductive and alluring images of the feminine, revealing the ways in which the body becomes the work of art itself, ready to be cast in the shape of our ideals."

Gutierrez's 2015 exhibition at Ryan Lee Gallery, Martín Gutierrez: Can She Hear You, included photographs, an installation of disassembled mannequins, paintings, and music videos.

In a 2018 Vice interview with Gutierrez, Miss Rosen noted:

Gutierrez uses art to explore the intersections of gender, sexuality, race, and class as they inform her life experience. The Brooklyn-based artist uses costume, photography, and film to produce elaborate narrative scenes that combine pop culture tropes, sex dolls, mannequins, and self-portraiture to explore the ways in which identity, like art, is both a social construction and an authentic expression of self.

Gutierrez's artworks were exhibited at 2019 Venice Biennale, curated by Ralph Rugoff. She exhibited photographs from Indigenous Woman including images from her Body En Thrall and Demons series.

In 2019, Gutierrez's work was presented in the solo exhibitions Martine Gutierrez Body en Thrall at the Australian Centre for Photography, Darlinghurst and Life / Like: Photographs, Mount Holyoke College Art Museum, South Hadley. Gutierrez's work was included in Crack Up - Crack Down, Ljubljana Biennial of Graphic Arts curated by Slavs and Tatars; Kiss My Genders, Hayward Gallery, Southbank Centre, London, UK; Transamerica/n: Gender, Identity, Appearance Today, McNay Art Museum, San Antonio, TX; and in Be Seen: Portrait Photography Since Stonewall, Wadsworth Atheneum Museum of Art, Hartford, CT which explored how artists have used portrait photography to challenge, subvert, and play with societal norms of gender and sexuality.

In 2019, photographs from the Gutierrez's Indigenous Woman series were exhibited in her solo exhibition Focus: Martine Gutierrez, organized by the Modern Art Museum of Fort Worth, Texas. Martine also installed a site-specific 15 ft × 70 ft (4.6m × 22m) mural in the gallery depicting a fanciful colonial landscape.

In 2023, Martine's work was exhibited at the Smithsonian American Art Museum, and in 2024, at the Sainsbury Centre, Fondation Carmignac, The Polygon, Museum of Modern Art, New York, LACMA, and The Whitney Museum of American Art.

== Artworks, performances, music, and video art ==
=== Martine Part I–X ===
Gutierrez's nine-part film Martine Part I–IX (2012–2016) dismantles gender identity through a semi-autobiographical story of her personal transformation. She spent six years creating the work and premiered the final segment in 2016 in her solo exhibition We & Them & Me, at the Contemporary Art Museum, Raleigh, North Carolina. It was also exhibited in her solo exhibition True Story at the Boston University Art Gallery in 2016.

=== Girlfriends ===
Girlfriends (2014) is a series of black-and-white photographs throughout which Martine poses with a single mannequin, creating ambiguous characters within changing realities. Composed and shot in upstate New York at the cottage of Gutierrez's grandmother, the photographs depict three different couples, each of whom Gutierrez appears to match with her mannequin counterpart. Her use of mannequins is apparent in Girlfriends, as with many of her artworks. During the mid-1960s, the form of the mannequin experienced an artistic change in which it was used to "…convey a feeling of overwhelming reality, convincing spectators…that they may be standing next to a real person. This illusion would be achieved by suggesting movement through pose and through the display artist's staging of the mannequin in a way that felt 'real'." Commenting on her usage of the medium, Gutierrez emphasizes the idealistic aspect of mannequins.

=== RedWoman91 ===
In 2014, Gutierrez's site-specific large-scale video installation RedWoman91 was installed in the windows of Ryan Lee Gallery New York. It featured Gutierrez posing in an "advertising red" jumpsuit, exuding "withering sexual power alternating with hesitant vulnerability" and was positioned to be visible to those walking on the High Line.

=== #MartineJeans ===
#MartineJeans (2016) was a 10 ft × 22 ft (3m × 6.7m) fictional advertisement Gutierrez produced for a billboard at the corner of 37th Street and 9th Avenue in New York City in December 2016. Completed during her Van Lier Fellowship in residence at ISCP, Gutierrez's public art project was created with support from The New York Community Trust, Edward and Sally Van Lier Fund, the New York City Department of Cultural Affairs in partnership with the City Council, and the New York State Council on the Arts. The billboard portraying her topless, wearing only jeans, was designed by Gutierrez to look like a real advertising campaign for a high-end fashion brand. Gutierrez's interest in producing a body of work continuing the concept of #MartineJeans evolved into her satirical fashion magazine Indigenous Woman (2018).

=== Indigenous Woman ===
Indigenous Woman (2018) is a 146-page art publication (masquerading as a glossy fashion magazine). The art critic Andrea K. Scott wrote of the project, "The [magazine's] front and back covers are clearly modeled on Andy Warhol's Interview, down to the jagged cursive font that spells out the title. Inside, a hundred and forty-six pages are filled with Vogue-worthy fashion spreads—and the ad campaigns that make them possible—featuring Gutierrez playing the roles of an entire agency's worth of models. In addition to posing, Gutierrez also took every picture, styled every outfit, and designed all the layouts." For her FOCUS exhibition, Martine presented photographs from the Indigenous Woman series.

=== Other works ===
Gutierrez's music has been used by Dior and Acne Studios in video editorials, and Saint Laurent set its 2012 resort collection video to her single "Hands Up." She collaborated with i-D in 2015, co-directing a music video with musician Ssion that stars Gutierrez alongside mannequins dressed in costumes by French designer Simon Porte Jacquemus. The video "The Girl For Me" accompanies music written and produced by Gutierrez.

Beginning as an installation commissioned by Aurora in 2015, Gutierrez produced and performed in collaboration with musician Nomi Ruiz in Origin, a digitally streaming selfie performance simultaneously filmed in front of a live audience. The music, produced by Gutierrez originally written for Ruiz to perform, also titled Origin, was released on iTunes in 2018.

Filmed in Brooklyn, Tulum, Oakland, and Miami, Gutierrez produced and directed the music video Apathy (2018) for her song of the same name. In 2019 she wrote, produced, and performed in Circle, an immersive live performance series held at Performance Space New York. The sci-fi thriller casts Gutierrez as Eve, an alien held captive by a secret bio weaponry cooperation known as Circle.

In 2021 the Public Art Fund commissioned ANTI-ICON which was exhibited in bus shelters across America. In 2022, HIT MOVIE Vol.1 was commissioned by the Contemporary Art Museum St. Louis. Installed on a billboard located across the street from the Whitney Museum of American Art, the museum exhibited Martine's Supremacy Billboard 2022-2023, in which, "...with mouth open in an apparent state of rapture, the model is played by LGBTQ rights activist and artist Martine Gutierrez, in an image that she also conceived, produced, and photographed." As part of the project, Martine also produced a concluding performance titled 'Supremacy: Corporate Retreat' held on March 8th, 2023.

== Film and television ==
Gutierrez has had acting roles in several Julio Torres projects, first as an impaled beauty pageant queen in Los Espookys (2022), then as a gallerist in Problemista (2023), then as Vanesja, a performance artist turned agent in Fantasmas (2024). She is in Sebastián Silva’s Rotting in the Sun, which premiered at Sundance film festival in 2023.

== Publications and commissions ==
Martine's photograph Masking, Starpepper Mask (detail) (2018) from Indigenous Woman (2018) was the January 2019 cover of Artforum. The issue Vol. 57, NO. 5 was an expose including original ads and artworks by Martine.

Gutierrez's photograph Demons, Tlazoteotl, Eater of Filth from Indigenous Woman (2018) was the cover of RISDXYZ, Spring/Summer 2019.

Gutierrez's series Showgirls Of The Mountains was commissioned for Swarovski Book of Dreams, volume 3, 2019, and shows Swarovski crystal jewelry designed by Martine with Michael Schmidt.

A set of self-portraits of Gutierrez titled Xotica created in Tulum Mexico, appeared in Garage, issue 16, 2019.

Interview commissioned Catfight, group portraits of Gutierrez and her friends, print April 2019. The fashion shoot styled by Gutierrez is documented in a behind the scenes video. She commented in Interview:

Magazines and advertising and now, more than ever, social media, are the codes that the next generation is learning from. Being a trans woman of color, it's like, no shade, but don't just invite us in. Give us marginalized folks autonomy over our own image so that we can at least voice our own ideas instead of them being appropriated by the mainstream.

In 2020 Martine's work was featured in Aperture Magazine issue 240 'Native America', a special issue about photography and Indigenous lives, guest edited by artist Wendy Red Star.

Martine photographed the 'Interview Magazine X Carolina Herrera' collaboration and cover editorial with fashion editor Dara Allen featuring Symone, in 2021. Document Journal's 'Identity in Flux' cover editorial 'Child Interrupted' included a self-portrait portfolio by Martine in 2023. A self-portrait portfolio by Martine, fashion editor Pascal Mihr, was also included in The Wrap Book Vol.2 'The Art of Television' in 2024.

Martine was featured in the Wallpaper cover story 'Creative America' celebrating 50 creatives "driving the current discourse on American culture and its dynamic evolution", photographed by duo Inez & Vinoodh." She was a model for the 2025 Pirelli Calendar photographed by Ethan James Green. Her work is included in the publication, 'Queens in Antiquity and the Present: Speculative Visions and Critical Histories' edited by Patricia Eunji Kim and Anastasia Tchaplyghine, as well as, 'Queer Art: From Canvas to Club, and the Spaces Between' by Gemma Rolls-Bentley.

== Notable works in public collections ==
- Indigenous Woman, 2018, The Met Costume Institute
- Body En Thrall, p120 from Indigenous Woman, 2018, Museum of Modern Art, New York
- Neo-Indeo, Cheek a Boom, 2018, National Gallery of Art, D.C.
- Queer Rage, Girlicious *Like Me, p80 from Indigenous Woman 2018, Whitney Museum of American Art
- Clubbing, 2012, HD video, color, sound, Smithsonian American Art Museum
- Demons, Tlazoteotl 'Eater of Filth' (2018), Bowdoin College Museum of Art, Brunswick, Maine
- Maria from ANTI-ICON: APOKALYPSIS (2021), McNay Art Museum, San Antonio, Texas
- Queer Rage, Don't touch the art (2018), Allen Memorial Art Museum, Oberlin, Ohio
- Indigenous Woman (2018), Allen Memorial Art Museum, Oberlin, Ohio

== Personal life ==
While working on her multi-part film Martine Part I–X in 2012, Gutierrez changed her first name to Martine by "[adding] an ‘e’ to the end of my name... same pronunciation, different gender." In 2024, she dropped her last name, going by only her first name.

Martine lives and works in Brooklyn, New York.
