= Fantasmas (TV series) =

- Genre: Surrealist comedy
- Created by: Julio Torres
- Written by: Julio Torres
- Directed by: Julio Torres
- Starring: Julio Torres; Martine Gutierrez; Tomas Matos; Joe Rumrill
- Music by: Lia Ouyang Rusli
- Country of origin: United States
- Original language: English
- No. of seasons: 1
- No. of episodes: 6

Production
- Executive producers: Julio Torres; Emma Stone; Dave McCary; Alex Bach; Daniel Powell; Olivia Gerke
- Producers: Charles Miller; Neha Simon
- Cinematography: Sam Levy
- Editors: Jacob Secher Schulsinger; Nolan Jennings
- Running time: 28-30 minutes
- Production companies: Fruit Tree; Irony Point; 3 Arts Entertainment

Original release
- Network: HBO
- Release: June 7 – July 12, 2024

Fantasmas is an American surrealist comedy television series created, directed, and written by Julio Torres, who also stars in it. It follows Torres on the search for a golden oyster earring, and the people he encounters on the way.

It had its world premiere at the ATX Television Festival on May 30, 2024. It premiered on June 7, 2024, on HBO. The series also won a 2024 Peabody Award.

== Premise ==
Julio Torres goes on the search through New York City, for a golden oyster earring, encountering people along the way.

== Cast and characters ==
=== Main ===
- Julio Torres as himself
- Martine Gutierrez as Vanesja
- Tomas Matos as Chester
- Joe Rumrill as the voice of Bibo

=== Supporting ===
- Eudora Peterson as Amina Roberts, a teacher
- Bowen Yang as Dodo, an elf from Santa's workshop
- Greta Titelman as Gina, an aspiring actress
- Ikechukwu Ufomadu and Sydnee Washington as Oscar and Vicky, siblings running a business together
- Michael Graceffa as Derrrick, a fitness instructor
- Spike Einbinder as Carl, a superhero fan
- Bernardo Velasco as Edwin, a food delivery worker
- Ana Fabrega as Trish, an actress

=== Guest ===
- Jaboukie Young-White as Skyler, an influencer
- Paul Dano and Sunita Mani as a sitcom husband and wife
- Steve Buscemi as Q
- Evan Mock as Z
- Alexa Demie as Becca, a customer service rep for an insurance company
- Ziwe Fumudoh as a customer service rep for an airline
- Dominique Jackson as the Algorithm
- Julia Fox as Mrs. Claus
- Aidy Bryant as Denise, a saleswoman for toilet dresses
- John Early, Aaron Jackson, and Josh Sharp as the voices of hamsters
- Kim Petras and Princess Nokia as mermaids
- Tilda Swinton as the voice of water
- Kate Berlant as a theme park superhero actor
- Tommy Dorfman as a commercial director
- Dylan O'Brien as Dustin, one of Vanesja's clients
- Amy Sedaris as Vanesja's former art teacher
- Natasha Lyonne as Suzanna, a Zappos executive
- Patti Harrison as the voice of a goldfish named Deedra
- Sam Taggart as Bryce, assistant to Deedra the goldfish
- Rachel Dratch, Cole Escola, Rosie Perez, and Emma Stone as cast members of the reality show The True Women of New York
- James Scully as the producer of The True Women of New York

== Episodes ==
| No. | Title | Directed by | Written by | Original release date |
|---|---|---|---|---|
| 1 | "Cookies and Spaghetti" | Julio Torres | Julio Torres | June 7, 2024 |
| 2 | "Valued Customer" | Julio Torres | Julio Torres | June 14, 2024 |
| 3 | "Toilets" | Julio Torres | Julio Torres | June 21, 2024 |
| 4 | "Looking4Twinks2S**k" | Julio Torres | Julio Torres | June 28, 2024 |
| 5 | "The Little Ones" | Julio Torres | Julio Torres | July 5, 2024 |
| 6 | "The Void" | Julio Torres | Julio Torres | July 12, 2024 |

== Production ==
=== Development ===
In February 2022, it was announced that Julio Torres would write, direct, executive produce, and star in the series for HBO, with Emma Stone and Dave McCary set to produce under their Fruit Tree banner. In December 2022, HBO greenlit the series.

=== Casting ===
In April 2024, it was announced Martine, Joe Rumrill, Julia Fox, Ziwe, Alexa Demie, Steve Buscemi and Kim Petras would appear in recurring and guest roles.

== Reception ==
=== Critical reception ===
On the review aggregator website Rotten Tomatoes, 94% of 31 critics' reviews are positive, with an average rating of 7.8/10. The website's consensus reads: "A colorful succession of sketches made cohesive by Julio Torres' one-of-a-kind sensibility, Fantasmas is another vivid variation on the wunderkind's imaginative themes." On Metacritic, the series holds a weighted average score of 84 out of 100, based on 16 critics, indicating "universal acclaim".

=== Accolades ===
| Year | Award | Category | Recipient(s) | Result | Ref. |
|---|---|---|---|---|---|
| 2025 | Gotham TV Awards | Breakthrough Comedy Series | Julio Torres, Emma Stone, Dave McCary, Olivia Gerke, Alex Bach, and Daniel Powell | Nominated | |
| 2025 | Gotham TV Awards | Outstanding Performance in a Comedy Series | Julio Torres | Won | |
| 2025 | Independent Spirit Awards | Best New Scripted Series | Julio Torres, Emma Stone, Dave McCary, Olivia Gerke, Alex Bach, and Daniel Powell | Nominated | |
| 2025 | Independent Spirit Awards | Best Lead Performance in a New Scripted Series | Julio Torres | Nominated | |
| 2025 | Peabody Awards | Entertainment | HBO in association with Irony Point, Fruit Tree, 3 Arts Entertainment, and Space Prince Inc. | Won | |
| 2025 | Critics' Choice Super Awards | Best Science Fiction/Fantasy Series, Limited Series or Made-for-TV Movie | Fantasmas | Nominated | |
| 2025 | Critics' Choice Super Awards | Best Actor in a Science Fiction/Fantasy Series, Limited Series or Made-for-TV Movie | Julio Torres | Nominated | |
