= The Special Without Brett Davis =

- Created by: Brett Davis
- Written by: Brett Davis; Darren Mabee
- Directed by: Edmond Hawkins
- Starring: Brett Davis; Darren Mabee
- Country of origin: United States
- Original language: English
- No. of episodes: 168

Production
- Executive producers: Brett Davis; Chris Gethard; J.D. Amato
- Producers: Brett Davis; Darren Mabee; Frank Flaherty; Edmond Hawkins; Joseph Nolfo; Billy Nord; Kate Sweeney; Erica Getto; John Ambrosio; Russell Dolan; Harris Mayersohn; Cassie Grimaldi; Jasno Swarez; Nick Foligno
- Running time: 60 minutes

Original release
- Network: Manhattan Neighborhood Network
- Release: February 18, 2015 – May 29, 2019

The Special Without Brett Davis is a public-access television show on Manhattan Neighborhood Network. The show takes the form of an ever-changing live "special" with a new format and performers, and a host portrayed by comedian Brett Davis.

The show adopted the Wednesday night 11pm timeslot previously held by The Chris Gethard Show after it moved to cable.

== Contributors ==
The show features a rotating cast of comedians in varying roles week to week, in character or as themselves.

Past contributors include Jo Firestone, Chris Gethard, John Early, Ana Fabrega, Julio Torres, Anna Drezen, Bridey Elliott, Conner O'Malley, Joe Pera, Josh Gondelman, Cole Escola, James Adomian, Patti Harrison, Sunita Mani, Tallie Medel, Ziwe Fumudoh, John Reynolds, Anna Drezen, Ikechukwu Ufomadu, Matt Rogers, Zach Cherry, and Bridey Elliott.

Every episode featured a "joke of the week" from "Mr. Jokes" Steve Whalen, who mainly appeared as himself regardless of the episode's theme.

== Guests ==
The show featured interviews with actors including Michael Shannon, Natalia Tena, Danny Tamberelli, Richard Kind, Alex Brightman, Rose McGowan, Tim Williams, Kevin Corrigan and Logan Miller.

The show also featured comedians such as Gilbert Gottfried, Janeane Garofalo, Brian Stack, Dave Hill, Jake Fogelnest, Megan Koester, Artie Lange, and Tom Scharpling.

The show also featured many names from the world of wrestling, including Lita, Dave Meltzer, New Jack, Virgil, Dalton Castle, Salina de la Renta, Low-Ki and Pat Buck.

Other personalities that appeared include: Scott Rogowsky, Karley Sciortino, Lloyd Kaufman, Ruby Karp, Adam Richman, Chapo Trap House, Dasha Nekrasova, Jesse Camp and Marnie the Dog.

Musical guests included Jerry Paper, The Thermals, Jean Grae, Screaming Females, Sloppy Jane, Thick, Emily Wells, Sunflower Bean, Mr Twin Sister, Meredith Graves, Guerilla Toss, M Lamar, Lushlife, Dougie Poole, Ava Luna, Domino Kirke, SAVAK, A Place To Bury Strangers, Jazzboy, Long Neck, Tredici Bacci, The Vandelles, Showtime Goma and more.

== Storylines ==
Despite its weekly rotating format, The Special maintained several narrative arcs across its run:

- The Cosmic War: A supernatural feud between warring cults led by duplicitious hippie Father Cyrill and the heartbreak-plagued, Eyes Wide Shut-inspired Grand Inquisitor, whose clashes over mystical artifacts and oblivious disciple Freshie Freshie spark the end of days.
- John Gentle: A melancholy, disgraced former college poetry professor whose personal failures—unrequited love, a bitter divorce, incarceration, and a pyramid scheme—culminate in the finale, where he learns he's the sole figure capable of averting the apocalypse.
- Bobby Blayze vs. Harley Tucker: A pro wrestling feud pitting reluctantly heroic Kentucky wrestler Bobby Blayze against violent ex-con "Skull Fucker" Harley Tucker and his sassy manager Sweet Daddy Longlegs, builds to a live wrestling match.
- Traffic School: A Breakfast Club-inspired arc following adult traffic school students through detention, prom, and graduation under their severely tight-wound instructor, Leon Pugh, whose demeanor stems from an uncomfortable physical condition.
- The Mid-2000s Indie Rock Avengers: An MCU parody where Davis as James Murphy recruits indie icons (impersonations of Conor Oberst, Feist, and Sufjan Stevens) who fail to write a song to defeat Thanos, and time-travel back to 2005 for another shot.
- Truth or Myth with Smith: A public-access parody featuring libertarian conspiracy-theorist Smith and his house band, Smitty and The Thrillride, whose dull, droll civic-journalism panels gradually escalate into madness.
- Kelsey Grammer and Mike Love: Unhinged parodies of conservative celebrities begin with the hubristic actor hiding a dark secret while upstaged by the real Michael Shannon in Kelsey Lately, while a grim Mike Love uses transcendental meditation to relive old grievances against tyrannical bully Brian Wilson in Mike Love and Mercy. Their self-involved telethon for a dying teen in Go, JoJo, Go! and the subsequent R.I.P. JoJo ultimately trap them in a Sartre-inspired nightmare of their own making.
- The Warlords: A Troma-style post-apocalyptic street gang—King Turbo, Wrex Wreckage, Scorpina Black, and The Mutant Mutilator—whose face-painted, deeply stupid members periodically hijack broadcasts.
- Meta-Narratives: A blurred boundary between reality and fiction featuring studio revolts, takeovers by Jesse Camp and Chris Gethard, and a meta-crisis where Steve Whalen ("Mr. Jokes") becomes the suave "Stephan Whélan" (inspired by Stefan Urquelle).

== Episodes ==
| # | Title | Description | Guests | Musical guest |
|---|---|---|---|---|
| n/a | Truth or Myth with Smith | Public access producer Smith presents his talk program, about education, local politics, spiritualism and more. | Anna Drezen, Ikechukwu Ufomadu, Julio Torres, Brett Wean, Spike Einbinder, Ana Fabrega, River L. Ramirez, Tynan DeLong, Michael Wolf | Smitty & The Thrillride |
| 1 | John Gentle | Chris Gethard hands over the show to Brett Davis, who is instantly murdered. John Gentle fills in for the recently departed host and sadness ensues. | Jake Fogelnest, Ana Fabrega, Spike Einbinder, Alec Lambert | Washer |
| 2 | Bobby Blayze | Pro wrestling hero Bobby Blayze meets an obsessive fan and a contract signing with rival Oak Tree Lee goes awry when Harley Tucker drops by. | Jo Firestone, Tom McCaffrey, Jeff Cannonball | Glazer |
| 3 | Freshie Freshie | Hippie bro Freshie Freshie doesn't realize he's in a cult. Les Savy Fav's Tim Harrington stops by and is swayed by the hypnotic Father Cyrill to join The Perception Society. | Conner O'Malley, Tim Harrington, Becca Kauffman, Mary Houlihan, Colin Burgess, Joe Rumrill, Eliza Hurwitz | Brick Mower |
| 4 | Vic & The Moose | Vic and The Moose host a televised version of their edgy radio show, but personal issues keep popping up off the air. | Ana Fabrega, Bobby Tisdale, Joe Rumrill, Tynan DeLong | Blood Moon |
| 5 | Sweet Daddy Longlegs | Sweet Daddy Longlegs slums it on the show with actor Kevin Corrigan, Harley Tucker, his Jezebelles, and an unwanted guest. Bobby Blayze attempts to get revenge. | Kevin Corrigan, Julio Torres, Spike Einbinder, Ana Fabrega, River L. Ramirez, Eliza Hurwitz, Sam Taggart | Crystal Robots |
| 6 | BANANAZZZ | Craig Evanhalen has retired from music and promotes his new job as a "punk business guru" but an impromptu BANANAZZZ reunion causes a meltdown. Cyberpunk hacker Andrew_Stinger breaks the system. | BANANAZZZ, Riley Soloner | Wax Darts |
| 7 | The Chris Gethard Show | A regular episode of The Chris Gethard Show goes awry when the terrorist minions of sexgod The Grand Inquisitor arrive seeking a stone. | Tom Scharpling, Marnie the Dog, Tim Williams, Christi Chiello | Milk Dick |
| 8 | Count Dracula | Count Dracula and his friends host a Halloween Special. Bride of Frankenstein and Jeff have relationship issues. Blade sings. Pazuzu dances. | River L. Ramirez, Ikechukwu Ufomadu, Colin Burgess, Spike Einbinder | Ava Luna |
| 9 | The Perception Society | The Perception Society displays their talents and praises Father Cyrill. Ralph the Dad is there to support his daughter's new interest. The Great Darkness crashes the celebration. | John Reynolds, Arthur Meyer, Mary Houlihan, Colin Burgess, Eliza Hurwitz | Lost Boy? |
| 10 | Out of Control Teens | Retired from the ring after his last run-in with Harley Tucker, Bobby Blayze hosts a talk show to help some out of control teens. Harley arrives and forms a gang with the teens, until New Jack shows up. | New Jack, Conner O'Malley, Gary Richardson, John Reynolds, Carmen Christopher, Matt Barats, Annie Donley | Nuclear Santa Claust |
| 11 | The Grand Inquisitor | The centuries-old leader of The Great Darkness, The Grand Inquisitor, throws an orgy with Father Cyrill as the sacrifice, but he cannot get over his ex, Alyssa. | Danny Tamberelli, Spike Einbinder, Charlie Hankin | Phemale |
| 12 | Faculty Talent Show | Artie Lange is a celebrity judge for an ill-advised faculty talent show put on by John Gentle, in an attempt to get his friend James Ugo a job in the English department. | Jo Firestone, Ikechukwu Ufomadu, Christi Chiello | Very Fresh |
| 13 | Freakman's Zone | Ray Science & Lloyd say farewell to their long running television show, and stick around to pass the show over to a much more colorful, and much more troubling replacement. | Mindy Tucker, Ana Fabrega, River L. Ramirez, Matt Porter, Charlie Hankin | Love Spread |
| 14 | CUL8R | Craig Evanhalen fires punk band BANANAZZZ to reunite his old boy band CUL8R. We learn what happened to the boys since their breakup. | Adam Richman, River L. Ramirez, Tynan DeLong, Joe Rumrill, Colin Burgess | Kicking Spit |
| 15 | Kelsey Lately | The hubris of actor "Kelsey Grammer" leads to him creating his own late night talk show. Academy Award nominee Michael Shannon upstages him, and talk of a mysterious "strangler" drives him over the edge. | Michael Shannon, Bridey Elliott | Jerry Paper, Corporal |
| 16 | Rumspringa | Willem and Miriam Miller, two Amish teens on Rumspringa, visit the city for the first time and meet Gilbert Gottfried. Chaos unfolds when their estranged brother Levi and the Skuntz boys show up. | Gilbert Gottfried, Sally Burtnick, Anna Drezen, Andrew Tisher, Joe Rumrill, Tynan DeLong | Pox |
| 17 | Juggalo Family | A family game show turns into Juggalo TV when Busta Nut, Creampie, the terminally ill Shitstayne X and the juggalo family take over the airwaves. | Jena Friedman, Mary Houlihan, John Reynolds, Carmen Christopher, Ana Fabrega, River L. Ramirez | Shilpa Ray |
| 18 | Drac | Joe Palmer and Count Dracula are unlikely roommates. When Drac gets too nervous to talk to the cute bartender, Joe and actor Richard Kind try to help him, but get distracted by the big game. | Richard Kind, Joe Pera, Ana Fabrega, Nick Naney | Fern Mayo |
| 19 | Vic & The Moose & Tyler | Vic and The Moose get a new producer who changes the show to make it less problematic. New co-host Tyler has some notes for Shitty Linda. | Rose McGowan, John Early, Julio Torres | Jounce |
| 20 | La Vie En Rose | John Gentle learns about love with co-host, co-worker, and secret crush Rose Johnson. John and Rose talk to Slutever's Karley Sciortino and pick-up artist Deluxxxe. | Karley Sciortino, Jo Firestone, Spike Einbinder, Catherine Cohen, Alyssa Limperis, Sandy Honig, Mitra Jouhari | Shellshag |
| 21 | Freakman's Court | Doc Freakman hosts Freakman's Court, featuring a case between jilted lovers, and the trial of Harley Tucker. | Natalia Tena, Gary Richardson, Christi Chiello, Colin Burgess, Jeff Cannonball | Air Waves |
| 22 | Akiva Smirnoff | White Rope Akiva Smirnoff, son of Yakov, showcases comedians for "consulate to the stars" Jack Hapley. | Brooke Van Poppelen, Ana Fabrega, Michael Wolf | White Rope |
| 23 | Blind Date Gauntlet | The Grand Inquisitor's masked orgy takes place in the background of a dating game show where he meets real life blindfolded contestants and competes to win the heart of a bachelorette. | Madonna Refugia, Greta Titelman | Radiator Hospital |
| 24 | Craig's New Band | Under the guidance of his recently divorced father, Craig Evanhalen fires BANANAZZZ (again) and they hold auditions for a new group. Craig talks to Michael Shannon about being in a band. | Michael Shannon, Dan Licata, Ana Fabrega, Brett Wean | Dreamcrusher |
| 25 | The Film Guys | Greg and Gregg welcome Bridey Elliott, Griffin Newman and Clare McNulty to talk about their film Fort Tilden. Director Gustav Országh comes out of seclusion to screen a piece from his film alongside his butler, Brinkley. | Bridey Elliott, Griffin Newman, Clare McNulty, Andrew Tisher | EZTV |
| 26 | Freak Man | When a whiz kid gains superpowers from drinking Slam Panic Energy Drink, Doc Freakman is the only one with the power to stop him. | Frank Conniff, Ana Fabrega, Steve DeSiena | Sunflower Bean |
| 27 | Fuck Money | Sweet Daddy Longlegs and Harley Tucker hold the show hostage and challenge Bobby Blayze. The Jezebelles hunt for Bobby. Virgil proves that everybody's got a price. | Virgil, Ana Fabrega, Eliza Hurwitz | Bueno |
| 28 | Comics Unchained | Akiva Smirnoff is joined by his comedian friends on Comics Unchained. Ricardo shows up and takes over the show with his friend, Big Baby. | Christian Finnegan, Ana Fabrega, Tim Platt | Hound |
| 29 | The Doctor's Corner | Dr. Escabara takes questions about health and fitness on her show, The Doctor's Corner, which slowly becomes an infomercial for Achexa's NutriCide health system. | Ana Fabrega | Small Black |
| 30 | Who's Afraid of Joyce Conner? | John has settled for Joyce Conner, a callous greeting card writer that happens to attract misery herself. In the length of one long, bitter, emotionally taxing dinner, their new marriage falls apart. | Cole Escola, Julio Torres | PWR BTTM |
| 31 | Frankenstein Tonight | Comedian Nate Fernald is booked on two rival shows: Dracula's lighthearted Drac-Ass, and a conservative talk show hosted by Frankenstein. When a prank war erupts between the two, Nate is caught in the middle. | Nate Fernald, Matt Barats | Charly Bliss |
| 32 | Go JoJo, Go! | Kelsey Grammer hosts a telethon for "brain rot" sufferer JoJo. As celebrity guests like Rip Torn, Mike Love, and magician Daniel George leave JoJo underwhelmed, the telethon's true goal comes to light. | Jo Firestone, Dan Chamberlain, Mo Fry Pasic, Tim Platt | Iron Reagan |
| 33 | R.I.P. JoJo | Kelsey Grammer and the celebrities from the prior week's telethon return, and bask in the spotlight of a JoJo memorial show. A mysterious character named Crimbo appears, they soon realize that they cannot leave. | River L. Ramirez, Dan Chamberlain, Mo Fry Pasic, Tim Platt | Laced |
| 34 | Band Rescue | Screaming Females come to the show with the intention of celebrating 10 years as a band, but the DIY-conscious band is ambushed with an impromptu "band rescue" by industry reps intending to make them the next pop sensation. | Screaming Females, Mary Houlihan | Screaming Females |
| 35 | The Dark Web | Quaid and Stacy showcase some bargains on human organs, revenge porn, and ISIS-claimed artifacts on Q4V, home shopping for the dark web. They are joined by the "dark lord of the dark web" The Grand Inquisitor. | Ana Fabrega, Tynan DeLong, Brad Howe | Bug Arms |
| 36 | Judgement Games | Willem Miller's vicious cousin Elmo arrives to show a fun side of the Amish with The Judgment Games, the least fun game imaginable, and butts heads with guest Chris Gethard. Levi and Miriam descend into sin again. | Chris Gethard, Mikey Heller, Becca Kauffman, Sally Burtnick | Macula Dog |
| 37 | Truth or Myth with Smith Ep. 2 | Smith returns to MNN with his panel of experts on education, spirituality, politics and medicine and investigates the secret cults The Great Darkness and The Perception Society. | Anna Drezen, Ikechukwu Ufomadu, Julio Torres, Spike Einbinder, River L. Ramirez | Smitty & The Thrillride |
| 38 | Total Nonstop Dancing | Total Nonstop Dancing showcases cool fashion and a dance megamix that will keep you dancing forever. Host Clyde Hunter and Body Dreamz lead the party, which shifts when a gas leak is discovered. | Ana Fabrega, Alyssa Limperis, Greta Titelman, Eliza Hurwitz | Future Punx |
| 39 | Thwub Chubba Lumpus | Mr. Mee, former indie rocker turned children's television host, invites Craig Evanhalen and Sara Schaefer on to his show, Thwub Chubba Lumpus. However, Craig's negativity takes a toll. | Sara Schaefer, Joe Rumrill, Sandy Honig, Ana Fabrega, River L. Ramirez | Long Beard |
| 40 | The Christmas Special | A broken-hearted John Gentle spends Christmas in prison with his new cellmate, "Skull Fucker" Harley Tucker. Humiliated by the inmates and his former flames, he loses all hope. | Cole Escola, Carmen Christopher, Annie Donley, Gary Richardson | Gingerlys |
| 41 | Listen Out | Female pioneer and disgraced astronaut Gunner Marsh hosts her long-running feminist talk show Listen Out with a panel of women who excel in their fields, and confronts noted chauvinist Vic from Vic and The Moose. | Spike Einbinder, Anna Drezen | Emily Wells |
| 42 | Miércoles Enorme | Alonzo Cañas, Sonia Millionaria and María "ChuChi" Roberts host an emotional Spanish-language talk show, and invite some beautiful red-haired people on to be admired and pampered. | Julio Torres, Ana Fabrega, River L. Ramirez | Teen |
| 43 | Bingo Blayze | Bobby Blayze hosts a wrestling round table with his uncle, wrestling legend Bingo Blayze. | Pat Buck, Joel Gertner | Electric Trip |
| 44 | A Dracula Christmas | Dracula tries his best to throw an (out-of-season) Christmas party for all of his friends on a chilly February night, but a love triangle and a party crasher complicate things. | Spike Einbinder, Colin Burgess, Michael Wolf | Laura Stevenson |
| 45 | Guns | A "Mexican standoff" between a hitman and a mysterious stranger gets very complicated. | Ronny Chieng, Nick Naney, Sebastian DiNatale | Crazy & The Brains |
| 46 | The Next Science Superstar | Former MTV personality Jesse Camp is added to spice up competition to pick the host of Cosmos 3, forcing the scientists to degrade themselves to get the job. Behind the scenes drama spills onto The Special. | Jesse Camp, Daniel Simonsen, Andrew Tisher | Diet Cig |
| 47 | How To Be Funny | With new host Jesse Camp on a Bahamas vacation, "Mr. Jokes" Steve Whalen presents his comedy seminar, with guest comedian Aparna Nancherla. | Aparna Nancherla, Jesse Camp | Acid Dad |
| 48 | The Special With Jesse Camp | After taking over the show, Jesse Camp invites a mob of club kids, drag queens, punks, rockers, and weirdos to the show. | Jesse Camp, Michael Alig, Steve Conte, Gerry Visco, Nicky Ottav, Cardone | Fur Helmet |
| 49 | Quagmire | Following the Jesse Camp debacle, a rattled Brett Davis forces his friends to act out his vision of the non-existent Quagmire sitcom he moved to LA to star in. | Dave Hill, Tynan DeLong, Nick Naney, Mary Houlihan | Söft Dov |
| 50 | Kaiju Big Battel | The Special crosses over with Kaiju Big Battel when Doc Freakman and Bryce Bixby are recruited by Kaiju's nefarious Dr. Cube to create a destructive monster. | Kaiju Big Battel, Logan Miller, Three Busy Debras, Steve DeSiena | Thick |
| 51 | The Book Guys | Greg and Gregg are now The Book Guys. A dementia-suffering writer gets caught in a love triangle between superfan Roy and the insidious butler Brinkley. | Jacqueline Novak, Meredith Graves, Jim Tews, Andrew Tisher, Danny Groh | Hellbirds |
| 52 | Traffic School | Five adult traffic school students meet in detention, where they pour their hearts out to each other, and discover how they have a lot more in common than they thought. | Tallie Medel, Dan Chamberlain, River L. Ramirez, Dan Licata, Colin O'Brien | Guerilla Toss |
| 53 | The Good News | The pious Christian Mingle hosts his local religious talk show, The Good News, but gets caught in the middle of the feud between Father Cyrill and The Grand Inquisitor. | Brad Howe, Seth Herzog, Alyssa Stonoha | Lushlife / CSLSX |
| 54 | Space: The Female Frontier | Gunner Marsh and her all-female space exploration mission is compromised when she learns it's a charter trip for rich white men. But things go from bad to worse when an entity takes control of the crew's minds. | Spike Einbinder, Madonna Refugia, Anna Drezen | Very Fresh |
| 55 | WAR! | Freshie Freshie's 420 celebration is cut short when he is sent to spy on The Great Darkness. The war begins and Father Cyrill's secrets are revealed. The Grand Inquisitor asks Andy Breckman about the end of Rat Race. | Andy Breckman | Bambara |
| 56 | Bubble World | Rub Tubble and Pubb Bubb from the magical Bubble World find themselves in our world and want to help. Dr. Hickenbottom reveals they are walking infectious diseases. | Sally Burtnick | The Thermals |
| 57 | Mommy Match | Three prospective Moms compete for the chance to adopt a little orphan boy, and one contestant tries to sabotage her competition. | Amber Nelson, Katie Hartman | Fond Han |
| 58 | Black Moon Babylon: The Phalanx Riseth | A comic convention panel featuring the cast of a box office blockbuster becomes a battle of egos with difficult actors, secret romances and a method actor. | Amy Rutberg, Gary Richardson, Tessa Skara, Peter Mills-Weiss, Colin Burgess, Mo Fry Pasic, Lucas Gardner | Dead Leaf Echo |
| 59 | #YPR | John Gentle's prison experience leads him to a book deal, but he quickly gives the money to former students in a pyramid scheme. | Janeane Garofalo, Matt Barats, Tim Platt, Branson Reese | Mikey Erg |
| 60 | Caesar & Cleo | America's favorite couple, Caesar & Cleo is back on television in this blast from the past. All of your favorite jokes, songs and guests are back, despite the divorce trial. | Bridey Elliott, Carla Rhodes & Cecil | M. Lamar |
| 61 | Traffic School Prom | The Traffic School gang is back and it's prom season. Sam gets a makeover to impress Skutch, Tad comes in between Clane and Travis, who performs "Gylscerine" by Bush. Leon teaches everybody how to "Do the Pugh!" | Tallie Medel, Dan Chamberlain, River L. Ramirez, Dan Licata, Colin O'Brien, Anthony Oberbeck | Cellars |
| 62 | Traffic School Graduation | The Traffic School Gang says goodbye, but not before Detective O'Reilly solves all of the murders, Travis and Clane work out their issues, Leon Pugh finds his inner peace and Skutch saves Sam from her demons. | Tallie Medel, Dan Chamberlain, River L. Ramirez, Dan Licata, Colin O'Brien, Anthony Oberbeck, Riley Soloner | Ben Seretan |
| 63 | Battle of the Bands | Craig Evanhalen has a new noise project that defies labels, but he needs them to win a Battle of the Bands against a self-inflated singer-songwriter, a dry electronic duo and some old-fashioned Trumpet Boys. | Meredith Graves, Tim Platt, Kati Skelton | SAVAK |
| 64 | Executive Producers | Executive Producers Chris Gethard and JD Amato stop by to "fix" The Special and things get way too real. | Chris Gethard, JD Amato | B Boys |
| 65 | Free Ice Cream | In their first interactive crowdsourced episode, Brett and Darren give out ice cream to whoever shows up. It's not what Jo Firestone had in mind. Things get weird. Lots of screaming. | Jo Firestone, Riley Soloner | Pill |
| 66 | Truth or Myth: Democratic National Convention Special | Smith covers the DNC from Philadelphia, while the Truth or Myth team uses the opportunity to do the show they want to do. | Spike Einbinder, Steve DeSiena, Brett Wean | Museyroom |
| 67 | Mike Love & Mercy | Beach Boys "leader" Mike Love throws a very grim "summer beach party" and uses the power of transcendental meditation to relive his greatest victories. | John Reynolds, Dan St. Germain, Colin Burgess, Lucas Gardner | Sam Kogon |
| 68 | Fight Night | A crowd-sourced episode sees Bobby Blayze headed into a women's self-defense class...but the "Southern Spitfire" is actually the one learning self-defense from a camp of very serious female MMA fighters. | Mo Fry Pasic, Nicole Conlan | Warehouse |
| 69 | Drrty Lndry (The Silent Episode) | Another crowdsourced episode challenged the show to do an episode about vowels, leading to this silent film about a prosperous man who trades places with a bumbling tramp. | Madonna Refugia, Andrew Tisher, Brian Fiddyment, Edy Modica | Scully |
| 70 | Warlords | Homework tutoring show "Call-In With Colin" is interrupted by a facepainted dystopian street gang that want to take over the universe. | Jordan Carlos, Colin Burgess, Nicole Conlan | Long Neck |
| 71 | The Porn Guys / The Chore Guys | Greg & Gregg return with The Porn Guys, a show that's a bit too risque for the airwaves, and are replaced mid-episode by The Chore Guys, who have taken a bit too much ayahuasca. Things get Lynchian. | Tynan DeLong, Ikechukwu Ufomadu, Spike Einbinder | Sunshine & The Rain |
| 72 | Robot or Not | In a world where the uncanny valley has all but disappeared, society's newest form of entertainment is Robot or Not, a reality show in which the Voight-Kampff Test is treated as a spectator sport. | River L. Ramirez, Doogie Horner | Sex Jams |
| 73 | The Halloween Special | In this Halloween edition of the show, Count Dracula presents three tales of terror from three masters of horror. Spoiler: none of them are remotely scary or go well at all. | Jo Firestone, Nick Naney, Tynan DeLong | Pujol |
| 74 | Truth or Myth with Smith Ep. 3 | Truth or Myth discusses last night's presidential election. | Spike Einbinder, Brett Wean, Mike Abrusci, Diego Lopez | Smitty (solo) |
| 75 | Mornin' USA | Mornin' USA is America's favorite morning news show, and it's all fun with guest Alex Brightman from Broadway's School of Rock, and a former child star going off the deep end. However, when all of the news in the world is bad news, the show gets a little uneven. | Alex Brightman, Madonna Refugia, Nick Naney, Mary Houlihan, Tim Platt, Katie Hartman | All Boy / All Girl |
| 76 | Skuntz TV | Skuntz TV is stopped short when Chunk and Chigger discover that their beloved pool noodle is missing. Also murders happen. | Joe Rumrill, Tynan DeLong, Jamie Loftus | PC Worship |
| 77 | The Bucket List 2 | The long-awaited sequel to the 2007 comedy finds Jack and Morgan finding out they have cancer...again. With a shorter and more budget-friendly list, these friends have a touching, no-holds-barred adventure that shows it's never too late to live life to its fullest. | Wes Haney, Bardia Salimi, Linas Phillips | Mom and Dad |
| 78 | It's A Crimbo Christmas | George Bailey's life has gone from bad to worse and he wishes he wasn't born. But instead of a guardian angel...he gets Crimbo. | River L. Ramirez, Sebastian DiNatale, Nick Naney | D. Gookin |
| 79 | Alt-Right Christmas Special | Breitbart presents a wonderful Christmas special featuring Steve Bannon, Pepe the Frog, Milo and more white nationalists, trolls and human garbage. | | High Waisted |
| 80 | Acting | A high school acting class is turned upside down when a former student takes the reins and delves deep into his pupil's psyches to draw the best performances from them...or just out of malice. | Patti Harrison, Tim Platt, Josh Sharp, Aaron Jackson | Dams of the West |
| 81 | @eleven | Host Chris Hardwick presents a brand new hour of disposable content to play games like Trender's Game, Who's Funniest and #Hardwick. | Patti Harrison, Jeffrey Gurian, Nick Turner, Shalewa Sharpe, Colin Burgess, Charlie Hankin | Yucky Duster |
| 82 | Mary | Mary Houlihan becomes America's new favorite daytime talkshow host with her new show, Mary! This episode, she looks at some talented teens. | Mary Houlihan, Matt Rogers | Fruit & Flowers |
| 83 | Senate Hearings | The cabinet takes shape with oil tycoons, cobra commanders and a vizier from Agrabah. | Lauren Ashley Carter, Ana Fabrega, Sebastian DiNatale, Katie Hartman, Bardia Salimi | Honduras |
| 84 | Suggestion Box | A planned episode falls apart and becomes a call-in show. | | |
| 85 | MTV's Next | We flash back to the best year ever, 2006 or 2005 or whatever, where superficial teens try to make out with each other while their peers watch from a bus! It's MTV's Next! | Greta Titelman, Sam Taggart, Will Winner, Tessa Skara, Maria Wojciechowski | Vanity |
| 86 | Top O' Ta Evenin' To Ya | The Special celebrates St. Patrick's with hard Irish stereotypes. | Andrew Tisher, Wes Haney | Shop Talk |
| 87 | Web 2.0 Business | Web 2.0 Business share their secrets to success — from the latest and greatest tactics to strategies that have proven the test of time. Plus, Harold the Business Hound! | Nick Naney, Sebastian DiNatale | Natural Velvet |
| 88 | Goldie Goldberg & Friends | Have a fun adventure with Goldie Goldberg and her puppet pals, and maybe learn a few things! Like boundaries. | Jo Firestone, Branson Reese, Joe Rumrill, Tim Platt | Beverly |
| 89 | Ambrosia Forke's Psychic Hour | Psychic Ambrosia Forke hosts an hour of clairvoyance, music and comedy. Plus PENOS! | Spike Einbinder, Ruby McCollister, Amy Zimmer | Alien Trilogy |
| 90 | Rod Stewart | Some guys have all the luck, some guys have all the pain. A rollicking good time with rockstar Rod Stewart and his beautiful children who love him to bits and his best friend Van Morrison and a new world of pain. | Tim Platt, Colin O'Brien | Spowder |
| 91 | Impractical Jokers | The Impranktical Gooferz return to their alma mater, New Dorp High School in Staten Island but find they're not the only jokers in the school. With music from Dougie Poole! | Jay Miller, Casey Jost, Branson Reese, Brian Fiddyment | Dougie Poole |
| 92 | The Dakota Co-Op Board | A young couple trying to move into the famed Dakota building in Manhattan must first deal with the co-op board, led by a desperate Yoko Ono. The board hopes the young couple can offer more than just rent. | Bridey Elliott, Dave Bluvband, Liz Noth | Secret Mountain |
| 93 | Bombing | Alternative comedy is the world's most important artform. Watch what happens when alt comics stop being funny and start getting real. | Colin Burgess, Tynan DeLong, Sebastian DiNatale, Patti Harrison, Sally Burtnick, River L. Ramirez | Laser Background |
| 94 | Slumber Party | A shy girl's slumber party takes a strange turn when they try to contact the ghost of a cute teenage boy. | Marybess Pritchett, Sally Burtnick | JUICEBOXXX |
| 95 | What Could Possibly Be Amiss with These Women in Real Estate? And Who Pray Tell Is This Young Lady? Why Are These Women So Thrown by Such an Unassuming Young Woman? And Her Absolutely Charming Husband? The Men Certainly Seem Strange. Yes Something Seems to Be Off Here. Is That a Body? Hello? | In this technicolor melodrama, something is going on at an open house in beautiful Cranberry Island. | River L. Ramirez, Amy Zimmer, Ana Fabrega, Patti Harrison, Ruby McCollister, Ikechukwu Ufomadu, Andrew Tisher, Joe Castle-Baker | Stuyedeyed |
| 96 | Get Your Bits In Order! | The hit BBC show finally hits the shores of the US, but the transition is a bit rocky. | Nick Naney, Patti Harrison, Annie Donley, Paul Higbie, Joe Rumrill, Bardia Salimi | Landlady |
| 97 | Spider-Man: Keep The Dark On | In celebration of Spider-Man: Homecoming, we offer our version of the greatest Broadway musical of all-time, Turn Off The Dark! | Bardia Salimi, Mary Houlihan | Soft Spot |
| 98 | Vic & The Moose Reunion | A new podcast explores the breakup of shock jock duo Vic & The Moose and follows them to morning zoos and public radio. | Katie Hartman, David Carl | Ellen & The Degenerates |
| 99 | The Magic Awards | Chris Hardwick hosts The Magic Awards, and a man with powers he cannot control find himself at the center of attention. | Andrew Tisher, Brett Wean, Eudora Peterson | Monogold |
| 100 | 100 | The Special Without Brett Davis celebrates 100 episodes! Chris Gethard chats with old friends! Mr. Jokes! John Gentle looks for a purpose! Bobby Blayze seeks to settle old scores! Wally Whistle pays tribute to those we've lost. | Chris Gethard, Jo Firestone, Ana Fabrega, Nick Naney, Ikechukwu Ufomadu, River L. Ramirez, Annie Donley, Dan Chamberlain, Joe Rumrill, Tynan DeLong, Colin Burgess | Future Punx |
| 101 | Raddisson | Raddisson and his friend Jeremy Piven (not the actor) try to make the most viral video of all time! | Sasheer Zamata, Andre Hyland, River L. Ramirez | Rips |
| 102 | Penos | Penos the Omnipotent has descended from the Mountain of the Gods to compete with his brother Anos over their sister, and to seek a temple where he may be worshipped. | Branson Reese, Courtney Maginnis | Tredici Bacci |
| 103 | Frasier's Fan | Kelsey Grammer's biggest fan Conrad has an issue distinguishing fiction and reality. | Sunita Mani, Marcia Belsky | Domino Kirke |
| 104 | Craig's Website | Craig enlists help to build a website for his "new movement." | Mark Vigeant | A Place To Bury Strangers |
| 105 | Yakov | Yakov Smirnoff's nephew has a bad hangover when meeting the cast of The Tick. | Peter Serafinowicz, Jackie Earle Haley, Griffin Newman, Valorie Curry, Emmy Blotnick | Beechwood |
| 106 | Claywoman | John Gentle brings out the "friend in his mind" the decrepit Claywoman. | Brett Gelman, Michael Cavadias, Andrew Tisher | Weeping Icon |
| 107 | Stone Cold Steve Austin | Stone Cold Steve Austin is here and woke as all hell, alongside his workin' man pal Teddy Fowler. | Zach Broussard, Annie Donley | Larkin Grimm |
| 108 | You're The Sexpert | Sweet Daddy Longlegs and his Jezebelles host a sexy call-in show. | Spike Einbinder, Chris Duffy, Sally Burtnick, Simone Norman | Desert Sharks |
| 109 | Matt Pinfield | Matt Pinfield returns to television. | Peter Vack, Matt Barats, Mike Abrusci | Mike Adams at His Honest Weight |
| 110 | Family Dinner | The Portabello family is having a nice Sunday dinner but the kid brings home a "friggin' alien." | Sally Burtnick, Carmen Christopher, Giulia Rozzi, Nick Naney, Andrew Casertano, Matt Maragno, Katina Corrao | The Rizzos |
| 111 | Hee-Haw Gay | Hee-Haw is gay now. | Cole Escola, Sam Taggart, Joe Castle-Baker, Max Wittert, Tessa Skara, Chris Burns, Drew Anderson, Dave Mizzoni, Livia Scott | Coach N Commando |
| 112 | Vic Loves Moose / Funniest Home Videos | Vic & The Moose had an awkward encounter at a party. Then, a heaping helping of funny videos and one disgruntled host. | Reza Farazmand, Patti Harrison, Amy Zimmer, Jo Firestone, Danny Tamberelli, Sandy Honig, Anthony Oberbeck, Alan Resnick, Arthur Meyer, Laura Jacoves, Joe Rumrill, Bardia Salimi, Tynan DeLong, Colin Burgess, Sally Burtnick, Eric Dadourian, Max Wittert | Washer |
| 113 | Leon Pugh | Leon Pugh gives driving lessons and battles his own prudishness. | Ruby Karp, Caitlin Brodnick, Katie McVay | |
| 114 | A Warlords Christmas | The Warlords interrupt a Christmas Special to kill "the one they call Santa." | Lloyd Kaufman, Catherine Cocoran, Daniel Kibblesmith, Ikechukwu Ufomadu, Annie Donley | Fits |
| 115 | The Yelling Man | On the verge of quitting pursuing his social media dreams, Raddisson gets a very influential visitor. | Darcie Wilder, Matt Klinman, Kat Toledo, Rachel Kaly | Hot Knife |
| 116 | Blade | In this colorful 1960's adventure, Blade and his trusty sidekick must foil an evil plan by Dracula to poison Gothic City's candy supply. | Ikechukwu Ufomadu, Colin Burgess, Jen Goma, Eudora Peterson | Showtime Goma |
| 117 | New Characters 2018 | The Special recruits a new character. | Catherine Cohen, Steve DeSiena, Amy Zimmer, Jason Gore, Maya Sharma, Jess Lane, Kelsey Caine, Tommy Macnamara, Martin Urbano, Anya Volz, Hallie Haas | Mad Doctors |
| 118 | The Search For The New Mr. Jokes | Steve Whalen competes with a new prospective "Mr. Jokes" and must transform into Stephan Whelan. | Josh Gondelman, Seth Herzog, Andrew Tisher | Jennifer Vanilla |
| 119 | The Special Presents: Pasic & Platt | A couple stays in on Friday night. | Tim Platt, Mo Fry Pasic, Tessa Skara, Peter Mills-Weiss, Max Wittert | N/A |
| 120 | The Special Presents: Joe Rumrill | The Swingin' Bachelor With A Strict 7pm Bedtime is up way too late. | Joe Rumrill, Dan Chamberlain, Branson Reese | N/A |
| 121 | Truth or Myth with Smith 4 | Smith celebrates the holiday. | | |
| 122 | The Special Presents: Mary Houlihan | Mary Houlihan's talk show returns with a meme expert and a cat singer. | Mary Houlihan, Tony Zaret, Sally Burtnick, Nick Naney, Wes Haney, Bardia Salimi | Fascinations Grand Chorus |
| 123 | Aladdin | When a street urchin vies for the love of a beautiful princess, he uses a genie's magic power to make himself off as a prince in order to marry her. | Bardia Salimi, Mitra Jouhari, Nick Naney, Matt Rogers, Annie Donley, Colin Burgess, Darren Mabee, Caroline Yost, Jessy Morner-Ritt, Andrew Tisher | N/A |
| 124 | Ric Flair | "Nature Boy" Ric Flair hosts the show with his #1 fan Conrad. | Mo Kheir, Karen Chee | Phil From Accounting |
| 125 | A Night With Anthony Daniels | Acclaimed thespian Sir Anthony Daniels celebrates his career at The Actor's Group, but does not wish to speak about C-3PO. | Brett Davis, Darren Mabee, Colin O'Brien, Kelly Cooper, Phil Meister, Steve Jeanty, Richie Alfson, Amanda Xeller | Tough Age |
| 126 | West 59th Street | Faded public access legend Edna Bismarck is the last-minute replacement for a host, and it goes to her head. | Nate Fernald, Spike Einbinder | Long Neck |
| 127 | Assassin's Bluff, Part 1 | Tyler does a reading of his passion project, a screenplay called Assassin's Bluff. | Farah Brook, Fahreeha Khan | Sharkmuffin |
| 128 | Mid-2000's Indie Avengers | James Murphy brings together Feist, MF Doom, Sufjan Stevens, Conor Oberst, Eugene Hutz and Deerhunter to battle Thanos. | Naomi Fry, Dan Chamberlain, Tim Platt, Thomas Fricilone, Steve Jeanty, Jen Goma, Sally Burtnick, Maya Sharma, Simon Hanes, Colin Burgess | Sailor Boyfriend |
| 129 | Assassin's Bluff, Part 2 | Tyler completes his epic masterpiece and challenges the definition of the word incel. | Dasha Nekrasova, Katie Hartman, Keaton Monger, Colin Burgess, Kyle Erf, Dewey Lovett | El Silver Cabs |
| 130 | Fake Newsies | A plucky gang of newsies take on the media establishment by spreadin' the news people wanna hear. | Joe Castle-Baker, Paul Higbie, Brian Fiddyment, Felipe Di Poi, Ian Faria, Sam Lanier, Rachel Kaly | Diary |
| 131 | Queer Eye For The Grand Inquisitor | The Grand Inquisitor gets his groove back with help from Karamo, Jonathan, Bobby & Antoni. | Dave Hill, Phil Costello, Max Bernstein, Tarik Daniels, Danny Lempert, Daniel Rubenstein | Poppies |
| 132 | The Special Presents: Late Mic | A live open mic talk show. | Colin Burgess, Nick Naney | Atlas Engine |
| 133 | Weed vs Vape | Two smoking enthusiasts engage in a culture war. | Tynan DeLong, Sally Burtnick, Pat Byrne, Nick Fierro | Lina Tullgren |
| 134 | Video Challenge 2000 | A radical VCR-based game goes awry when Rumplestiltskin comes to play. | Michael Kupperman, Scotty Nelson, Cassie Grimaldi | The Rock N' Roll Hi Fives |
| 135 | BBQ! | Jerry Balducci throws a BBQ to meet his neighbors! | Brad Howe, Sally Burtnick, Zach Cherry, Clare O’Kane, Alex Winfrey, Rachel Kaly, Joe Castle-Baker | Bethlehem Steel |
| 136 | Woodstock '99: The Reunion | A cruise ship welcomes a Woodstock '99 Reunion at sea, featuring Kid Rock, Fred Durst & Wes Borland, G. Love, Adam Duritz, Lars Ulrich, Jewel, Moby, Everlast, Bruce Hornsby & Jamiroquai. | Tallie Medel, Andrew Tisher, Joey Dundale, Tony Zaret, Erica Getto, Spike Einbinder, Tynan DeLong | Hnry Flwr |
| 137 | Andre the Giant | Andre the Giant shares his feelings about being a normal man in a world too small. | Box Brown, David Carl | lost boy ? |
| 138 | Trivibot | The host of HQ is introduced to the incredible QA computing system Trivibot and its bizarre creator. | Scott Rogowsky | The Vandelles |
| 139 | Fleetwood Mac | The legendary band reunites for a television special. | Eve Peyser, Tessa Skara, Rachel Kaly, Kelly Cooper | N/A |
| 140 | MC Steinberg | MC Steinberg shows off his skills. | Jean Grae, Ikechukwu Ufomadu | Penthouse Boys |
| 141 | Ringo's Rangle | Ringo Starr hates animals, but decides to host a show with lots of them. | Shannon Coffey, Rob Michael Hugel, Martin Urbano, Kelsey Caine, Laura Jacoves | Material Girls |
| 142 | After Dark | We get a glimpse behind-the-scenes for the first time as Brett Davis attempts to make the show sexier on the behest of a new age wellness advisor, Dale Seever. | Marcia Belsky, Steve DeSiena, Harris Mayersohn, Patrick Marlborough, James Bewley | Jazzboy & Loucye300, Peachy |
| 143 | Political | Brett Davis rebrands the show again, as a neoliberal political debate show featuring the camera-loving Senator Warren Brookers & the controversial Warren Maddox. | Chapo Trap House, Sharron Paul, Sebastian DiNatale | Youth Expire |
| 144 | Xtreme | Brett's nervous breakdown continues as he rebrands the show again, this time trying to make it edgy, while Dale Seever continues to advise the cast & crew. | Marcus Monroe, Katie Notopoulos | Sloppy Jane, Blood Blush |
| 145 | Haters | Brett rebrands the show again to appeal more to Gen Z after he is bullied by a sincere vlogger, a cringe-loving Twitch streamer and an ASMR artist. | Simple Town, Kelly Cooper | Daddies |
| 146 | Phantom | A brooding, masked figure haunts the rafters of MNN and falls madly in love with Brett's new co-host. | Nick Naney, Sally Burtnick | The Wedding Funeral |
| 147 | T.R.Hell | Brett's brother, Bryce Davis, arrives just in time to push him fully over the edge, as Dale Seever's plan reveals itself. | Spike Einbinder, Max & Nicky Weinbach, Fareeha Khan, Matt Weir | Z |
| 148 | Dale Seever | Dale Seever puts Brett in a trance with the help of a hypnotist and takes over the show. | Chris Jones, Megan Koester | Stove |
| 149 | TBD | | | |
| 150 | The Hanukkah Special | The Phantom of MNN returns to celebrate Hanukkah, while Dale Seever consults with his higher power. | Josh Gondelman, Seth Herzog, Nick Naney, Sally Burtnick | Dylan Mars |
| 151 | Auld Lang Syne | Brett's trance is broken just in time to ring in the New Year in Times Square. | Ayo Edebiri, Larry Owens, Puddles Pity Party, Colin Burgess, Emily Panic, Lillian Devane | Daddies |
| 152 | New Characters 2019 | A new character is chosen for The Special! | Charlie Bardey, Pat Byrne, Francesca D’uva, Andres Govea, Sara Hennessey, Justin Linville, Jessy Morner-Ritt, Caroline Yost | Blank Range |
| 153 | Singled Out | Chris Hardwick presents a reboot of his 90's show Singled Out. | Shelby Fero, Bylthe Roberson | White Rope |
| 154 | The Special Presents: Ellen | After a shocking backstage attack by Chris Gethard, Brett hands the show over to comedy icon Ellen DeGeneres. | Rachel Kaly, Daniel Maseda, Anthony Oberbeck, Jessy Morner-Ritt, Francesca D’Uva, Edy Modica, Fareeha Khan, Maya Sharma | Sweaty |
| 155 | Brett Davis vs Chris Gethard | Chris Gethard and his TCGS crew teams up to stop Brett and The Special from breaking their record of shows on MNN. | Chris Gethard, James Bewley, Spike Einbinder, Rachel Kaly, Nick Naney, Colin Burgess, Rob Malone, Keith Haskel | Sloppy Jane |
| 156 | SPECIALMANIA | Bobby Blayze gets some help from Lita to get back in the ring and face Harley Tucker. | Lita, Dave Meltzer, Dalton Castle, Low-Ki, Ricky Martinez, Salina de la Renta, The Nobodies, Keith Elliot Greenberg | N/A |
| 157 | Stamp | A very strange episode. | Ziwe Fumudoh, Mike Drucker | Mrs. Smith |
| 158 | In the 70's | Tredici Bacci performs a full album with some help from The Special. | Eleanore Pienta, Sally Burtnick, Dan Arnes | Tredici Bacci |
| 159 | The Special Presents: Candy Dish | Much more than a creature from the sea... | Spike Einbinder, River L. Ramirez | Real Dominic |
| 160 | Mid-2000's Indie Avengers: Endgame | James Murphy goes back in time to 2005 to write the perfect song to defeat Thanos with Brett Davis as James Murphy, Conor Oberst, Dan Deacon, Feist, MF Doom, Thom Yorke, Sufjan Stevens, M.I.A., Deerhunter, Jenny Lewis, Karen O, Danger Mouse, Nardwuar and Spider-Man. | Sally Burtnick, Steve Jeanty, Riley Soloner, Jen Goma, Simon Hanes, Maya Sharma, Colin Burgess, Jenny Nelson, Jess Lane, Dan Arnes, Manolo Moreno, Pat Byrne, Bardia Salimi | Resounding No |
| 161 | The Special Presents: Smaltown Arts Society | Janice and Mara-Diane, the 50 year-old founders of Smaltown Arts Appreciation Society, bring art and performances from their desolate beach town. | Caroline Yost, Jessy Morner-Ritt, Devin Bockrath, Chase Montavon, Natalie Rotter-Laitman, Nadia Pinder, Cristian Uriostegui | New Love Crowd |
| 162 | Orville Redenbacher | Orville Redenbacher is a food scientist looking for a breakthrough by making specific types of corn, but is on the verge of a huge, intergalactic breakthrough. | Nick Naney, Wes Haney, Steve DeSiena, Jessy Morner-Ritt, Maya Sharma, Sebastian DiNatale, Jessica Ellis | Big Eyes |
| 163 | The Pughs | Leon Pugh is going to be a stepdad and tries to connect with a creepy baby doll. | Spike Einbinder, Tessa Skara, Colin O'Brien | Gemma |
| 164 | Behind the Special | When a guest cancels, the show becomes a behind-the-scenes look at the show. | Paul Higbie, Seth Pompi | Snakeskin |
| 165 | Thing in the Ring | Bobby Blayze finally steps in the ring with Harley Tucker. | Jack Silbert | N/A |
| 166 | Spaghetti Night | Jesse Ventura arrives to uncover The Grand Inquisitor's cabal of world elites during their annual spaghetti night. | James Adomian, Brian Stack | Very Nice Massage, Abby Lloyd |
| 167 | TV Party | A flashback to Glenn O'Brien's 1980's downtown NYC public access show, TV Party, on the verge of the end of the world. | Ziwe Fumudoh, Mary Houlihan, Pat Byrne, Dan Arnes | Rich From Lectrolux |
| 168 | The End | John Gentle is the one person that can stop the end of the world, so everybody has to be nice to him. | | Mr. Twin Sister |
