= Greta Titelman =

American actress and comedian

- Born: 1989 or 1990 (age 36–37)
- Known for: Los Espookys; Problemista
- Website: https://www.gretatitelman.com/

Greta Titelman is an American comedian, actress and writer. She has starred in shows including Search Party, Los Espookys, and the 2023 film Problemista. In 2019, she was selected for Comedy Central’s “Up Next” Showcase at Clusterfest 2019.

== Early life and education ==
Titelman grew up in Washington, D.C., and attended boarding school in Connecticut but graduated from Georgetown Day School. She attended the University of Arizona for one year and studied photography.

== Career ==
Titelman began her comedy career in New York City in 2012, following the death of her mother. She studied at the Upright Citizens Brigade, Queen Secret Improv Theater and the Peoples Improv Theater.

In 2019, Titelman was selected for Comedy Central’s “Up Next” Showcase at Clusterfest 2019. She has hosted multiple podcasts, including The Worst, Senior Superlatives, Lady Lovin', and Clown Parade along with Will Ferrell, Bowen Yang, and Matt Rogers. From 2019–2022, Titelman starred as Ambassador Melanie Gibbons on the series Los Espookys. She has also had starring roles on series including Search Party, Shrill, and Awkwafina is Nora from Queens.

In 2023, she made her debut at the Edinburgh Festival Fringe with her show, Exquisite Lies. The show played at The Pleasance theatre.

== Personal life ==
Titelman is married to Abe Schwartz and currently resides in Los Angeles, California.

== Filmography ==
Year	Title	Role	Notes
2015–2017	The Special Without Brett Davis	Various roles	
2019–2022	Los Espookys	Melanie Gibbons	
2020	Comedy Central Stand-Up Featuring	Self	
2020	Softcore	Her	
2021	Together Together	Charlotte	
2022	Shrill	Becky	
2022	Search Party	Leonora	7 episodes
2023	Awkwafina is Nora from Queens	Poosh	1 episode
2023	Problemista	Celeste	
2024	Fantasmas	Gina	4 episodes
2024-2025	After Midnight	Herself (contestant)	3 episodes
2025	Too Much	Teri	1 episode
2025	Las Culturistas Culture Awards	Self	—
2025	Loot	Wren	1 episode
2025	Late Night with Seth Meyers	Self	
2026	She Keeps Me Young		
2026	Las Culturistas Culture Awards	Self	
2026	Elsbeth	Summer	1 episode
