= Los Espookys =

American comedy television series

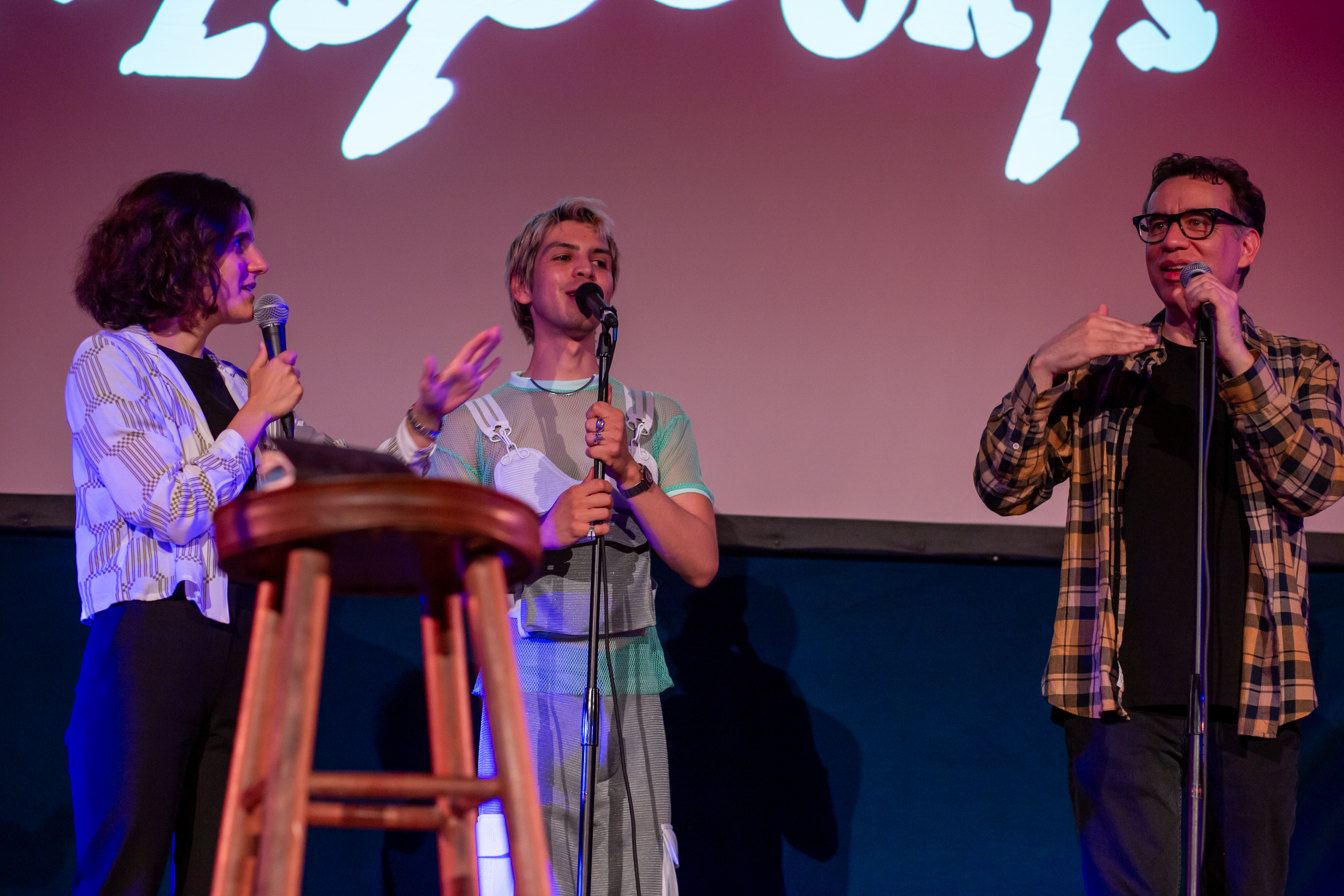
- Ana Fabrega, Julio Torres and Fred Armisen perform "Los Espooky's Live" in 2019
- Genre: Comedy
- Created by: Julio Torres; Ana Fabrega; Fred Armisen
- Starring: Bernardo Velasco; Cassandra Ciangherotti; Ana Fabrega; Julio Torres; Fred Armisen
- Composers: Emilio Acevedo; Gus Reyes; Andrés Sánchez
- Country of origin: United States
- Original languages: Spanish; English
- No. of seasons: 2
- No. of episodes: 12

Production
- Executive producers: Fred Armisen; Lorne Michaels; Andrew Singer
- Running time: 25-30 minutes
- Production companies: Broadway Video; Más Mejor; Antigravico; Fabula; HBO Entertainment

Original release
- Network: HBO
- Release: June 14, 2019 – October 21, 2022

Los Espookys is an American Spanish-language comedy television series created by Julio Torres, Ana Fabrega, and Fred Armisen, who also star alongside Bernardo Velasco and Cassandra Ciangherotti. The series follows a group of friends trying to turn their love of horror into a successful business, where most of their jobs consist of fabricating horror film-like situations and tricking people into thinking they are real. Los Espookys premiered on June 14, 2019, on HBO. In July 2019, the series was renewed for a second season which premiered on September 16, 2022. In December 2022, the series was canceled after two seasons. Los Espookys won a 2022 Peabody Award.

== Premise ==
Los Espookys "follows a group of friends who turn their love for horror into a peculiar business, providing horror to those who need it, in a dreamy Latin American country where the strange and eerie are just part of daily life."

== Cast and characters ==
=== Main ===
- Bernardo Velasco as Renaldo, a horror and gore enthusiast who assembles his friends to form Los Espookys. He is kind and optimistic, but naïve and incompetent with finances. He also appears to be asexual.
- Julio Torres as Andrés Valdez, Renaldo's best friend since childhood and member of Los Espookys, and the adopted heir to a chocolate empire. While trying to put up with his unapproachable parents and the future husband they chose for him, he is also haunted by a mysterious demon, and longs to unlock the secrets of his past.
- Cassandra Ciangherotti as Úrsula, a friend of Renaldo and sister to Tati, and a member of Los Espookys. She is smart, resourceful and more down-to-earth than the other members, but struggles with her job as a dental hygienist due to the mean behavior of her boss.
- Ana Fabrega as Tati, Úrsula's dimwitted sister and a member of Los Espookys. She is constantly switching between strange jobs to try to make a living and is willing to put herself into any situation the other Espookys need her in. She has a boyfriend whom she has only met online, but later marries Andrés's gay ex-boyfriend, oblivious to the fact it is not a love marriage.
- Fred Armisen as Tico, Renaldo's uncle and a trusted and dedicated employee of a valet parking company. He is very supportive of Renaldo's efforts and happy with his job, but struggles with his daughter's attitude problems and his own tendency to be too selfless. During the second season, Tico and his daughter move in with Renaldo after valet parking becomes obsolete due to self-parking cars, and he struggles to find a new direction, briefly joining Los Espookys.

=== Recurring ===
- José Pablo Minor as Juan Carlos, Andrés' vain boyfriend, who later becomes Tati's husband in a lavender marriage. He comes from a wealthy family that runs a successful cookie empire.
- Spike Einbinder as the Water Spirit, a mystical aquatic entity linked to Andrés' soul and lives inside of him. In season 2, she "quits" and enters the real world, getting a job as an assistant to Melanie Gibbons.
- River L. Ramirez as Sonia, Tico's bratty, mean-spirited, dependent daughter.
- Greta Titelman as US Ambassador Melanie Gibbons, who meets Los Espookys during one of their jobs, and later hires them for another. In season 2, a key subplot involves her trying to become US ambassador in Miami, unaware that it is part of the United States.
- Carmen Gloria Bresky as Mayor Teresa Lobos, a client of Los Espookys in season 1 who starts a presidential campaign in the second season.
- Adela Calderón as Renaldo's mother, who is constantly trying to find him a girlfriend.
- Giannina Fruttero as Beatriz, Renaldo's sister
- Carol Kane as Bianca Nova (season 1), an aging and forgotten American film director who befriends Tico.
- Martine Gutierrez as Karina Salgado (season 2), a beauty queen who was Miss Puerto Rico, and brutally died immediately after being crowned Nuestra Belleza Latina; in the second season, her ghost starts haunting Renaldo.
- Yalitza Aparicio as The Moon (season 2), whom Andrés can talk to
- Andrea Villalobos as Mónica Martinez (season 2), a cousin of Renaldo who starts working for Los Espookys after losing her previous job
- Sebastián Ayala as Oliver Twix (season 2), a neglectful yet flamboyant mortician
- Kim Petras as the Secretary of State (season 2)
- Isabella Rossellini as herself (season 2)

== Episodes ==
Season	Episodes	Originally released	
Season	Episodes	First released	Last released
1	6	June 14, 2019	July 19, 2019
2	6	September 16, 2022	October 21, 2022

=== Season 1 (2019) ===
No. overall	No. in season	Title	Directed by	Written by	Original release date	U.S. viewers (millions)
1	1	"El exorcismo" "The Exorcism"	Fernando Frias	Fred Armisen & Ana Fabrega & Julio Torres	June 14, 2019	0.272
Renaldo creates an elaborate horror theme for his sister's 15th birthday party. With his three horror-loving friends--Andrés, Úrsula and Tati--they create a business creating horror illusions. Andrés is dating Juan Carlos, a wealthy scion who only likes beautiful things and disapproves of ones he finds spooky. Úrsula and Tati are always working, concerned about money. The foursome is hired by an older priest to fake an exorcism so he can look better than a new, young, popular priest. The event is successful and they form "Los Espookys". They are given help by Renaldo's uncle, Tico, a legendary LA parking valet.
2	2	"El espanto de la herencia" "The Inheritance Scare"	Fernando Frias	Julio Torres & Ana Fabrega	June 21, 2019	0.195
Espookys is hired by an unknown client to frighten five people vying to win a deceased millionaire's fortune. The challenge for the guests is to stay the night in the decedent's "haunted" mansion. The client especially wants to make sure the man's son does not last the night. Úrsula is concerned about payment, but Renaldo tells her not to worry. The team create a number of innovative stunts, with Renaldo wanting to keep it simple while Andrés and Úrsula want to use a difficult trick. In the end, they do the difficult trick and are successful and they are paid. One of the five people is U.S. Ambassador to Mexico, Melanie Gibbons, who asks for their card for future work. In LA, Renaldo asks Tico to deliver a fake severed head of himself as a calling card, but instead Tico finds himself mistaken for a famous artist.
3	3	"El monstruo marino" "The Sea Monster"	Fernando Frias	Julio Torres & Ana Fabrega	June 28, 2019	0.191
Hired to replace a seaside town's tourist attraction, an owl with a wig, Los Espookys creates the illusion of a sea monster. It is a success, but they are paid in coupons to a local restaurant. Úrsula renegotiates with the mayor for cash and a monthly contract to keep the illusion fresh. Tati finally meets her chat-room boyfriend, who she only knows from the site's default icon. When he reveals his true self, she feels he lied about himself and rejects him. Tati decides to follow Beatriz's advice and be her own boss, investing in a health drink ponzi scheme, Hierbalite. Tico runs into Renaldo's favorite director in LA, Bianca Nova, and tries to connect her with the group. Juan Carlos proposes to Andrés, which would unite their family's business fortunes.
4	4	"El espejo maldito" "The Cursed Mirror"	Fernando Frias	Julio Torres & Ana Fabrega	July 5, 2019	0.058
U.S. Ambassador Gibbons hires Espookys to fake her own abduction, turning one week's vacation into two. In exchange, the foursome will get expedited visas so they can work with legendary director Bianca Nova. They decide to have Gibbons be abducted through a mirror portal. Andrés buys a cursed mirror and Gibbons disappears into an alternative mirror dimension. When Rinaldo breaks the mirror, Gibbons is trapped and they can't get their visas. Tati and Úrsula struggle to make their Hierbalite sales target and are threatened by the owner. Reluctant to marry Juan Carlos, Andrés' parents tell him they will cut off his money if he does not. When the mirror is put back together, Gibbons returns along with her reflection. Later, her reflection grants the team the visas they need.
5	5	"El laboratorio alienígena" "The Alien Lab"	Fernando Frias	Julio Torres & Ana Fabrega	July 12, 2019	0.134
Hired by a high-maintenance researcher, Espookys creates alien lab subjects to justify the grants given by the government. The team is distracted. Conflicted, Andrés does not want to marry Juan Carlos but likes his wealthy lifestyle. He discovers that he is connected to a water spirit who knows his pre-adoption origins but will not share them until he watches The King's Speech. Úrsula resents Rinaldo agreeing to client requests while she is tasked with making everything work. Both Úrsula and Tati are threatened personally by Hierbalite CEO Mark Stevens, creating even more stress. Bianca visits Tico and together they write a script about a werewolf valet. When the foursome talk about going to LA to work with Bianca, the group is conflicted as the script Tico and Bianca wrote and shared is terrible.
6	6	"El sueño falso" "The Fake Dream"	Fernando Frias	Ana Fabrega & Julio Torres	July 19, 2019	0.086
Renaldo goes to L.A. alone. Andrés and Úrsula together work with a sleep doctor, trying to create a fake dream to help a doctor's insomnia patient fall asleep. They realize that neither has Renaldo's skill at working with clients. On the film set, Renaldo struggles without his team. He becomes disillusioned as Bianca is demanding, eventually quitting and returning to Mexico. The water spirit shows Andrés that his adoptive parents were also his birth parents, who changed their mind about giving him away. Realizing he was destined to being the family scion, he agrees to marry Juan Carlos. Úrsula, knowing Andrés would be unhappy, tricks Juan Carlos into marrying Tati instead. Now wealthy, Tati pays off her Hierbalite debt. All issues resolved, the foursome successfully create a fake dream for their client.

=== Season 2 (2022) ===
No. overall	No. in season	Title	Directed by	Written by	Original release date	U.S. viewers (millions)
7	1	"Los Espiritus en el Cementerio" "The Spirits in the Cemetery"	Sebastián Silva	Julio Torres & Ana Fabrega	September 16, 2022	0.104
At a beauty pageant, the winner is killed in a mysterious accident. Her ghost haunts Renaldo. Andrés is now living with Renaldo and struggling to adjust to his post-chocolate-empire-scion life. Tati and Úrsula have a tiff, as the former embraces her married life with Juan Carlos while the latter tries to remind her it was only to help Andrés. Los Espookys come together to help a lazy cemetery groundskeeper who buries bodies in the wrong plots and does not want to be bothered by family complaints. Tico and the other valets have been replaced by self-parking cars. Without a job, his wife leaves him and he and his daughter leave to return to Mexico.
8	2	"Bibi's"	Sebastián Silva	Julio Torres & Ana Fabrega	September 23, 2022	0.129
Tati's marriage starts to fall apart. Los Espookys get a gig where Renaldo is transformed into Bibi's, a monster role model for students. After hearing that Tico and Sonia are moving back, Andrés looks for a new place to live. Andrés' parasitic demon leaves him to become Ambassador Melanie's intern.
9	3	"Las Ruinas" "The Ruins"	Sebastián Silva	Julio Torres & Ana Fabrega	September 30, 2022	0.109
Mayor Teresa decides to run for president, with a little help from Úrsula, after her town's attractions become a success. Los Espookys help a professor prove his, untrue, theory about ancient queer people wearing earrings. Tati gets a divorce. Úrsula evicts Andrés to make room for Tati again, and Andrés moves in with a rich widower.
10	4	"Las Muchas Caras de un Hombre" "One Man's Many Faces"	Sebastián Silva	Julio Torres & Ana Fabrega	October 7, 2022	N/A
Tati starts a new career as a writer. Andrés becomes an evil stepfather. Los Espookys help a returning client. After continuing to be haunted by her ghost, Renaldo decides to investigate Karina the pageant queen's death.
11	5	"El Virus" "The Virus"	Ana Fabrega	Julio Torres & Ana Fabrega	October 14, 2022	N/A
An actor who has gotten tired of her stale role on a long-running sitcom hires Los Espookys to get the show cancelled. Renaldo continues his investigation of Karina's murder by visiting the other pageant contestants. Ambassador Melanie's dream of working at the Miami Embassy hits a setback.
12	6	"El Eclipse" "The Eclipse"	Ana Fabrega	Julio Torres & Ana Fabrega	October 21, 2022	N/A
Tico struggles without his valet job. Andrés apologizes to Los Espookys. Los Espookys create an eclipse during Mayor Teresa's final speech before the presidential election. Renaldo gets close to finding out what happened to Karina.

== Production ==
=== Development ===
On November 21, 2017, it was announced that HBO had given the production, then titled Mexico City: Only Good Things Happen, a pilot order. The episode was written by Fred Armisen, Ana Fabrega, and Julio Torres and set to be directed by Fernando Frias. The production staff of the potential series was set to include Armisen, Lorne Michaels, Andrew Singer as executive producers and Torres and Alice Mathias as co-executive producers. Production companies involved with the series are expected to include Broadway Video and Más Mejor.

On July 2, 2018, it was announced that HBO had given the production, now titled Los Espookys, a series order for a first season. It was additionally announced that Fabrega would serve as a co-executive producer and that Antigravico would join the list of production companies involved with the series.

On April 16, 2019, it was announced that the series would premiere on June 14, 2019. On July 24, 2019, HBO renewed the series for a second season which premiered on September 16, 2022. Filming for the second season wrapped in February 2022. On December 2, 2022, HBO canceled the series after two seasons.

=== Casting ===
Alongside the pilot order announcement, it was confirmed that the pilot would star Bernardo Velasco, Cassandra Ciangherotti, Ana Fabrega as Tati, Julio Torres, and Fred Armisen.

== Reception ==
The review aggregator website Rotten Tomatoes reports a 100% approval rating with an average score of 8.90/10, based on 30 reviews. The website's critical consensus reads, "Igualmente hilarante y horripilante, Los Espookys is an espooky good time." Metacritic, which uses a weighted average, gave the series a score of 83 out of 100, based on reviews from 13 critics, indicating "universal acclaim".
