= Together Together =

2021 American comedy film

- Theatrical release poster
- Directed by: Nikole Beckwith
- Written by: Nikole Beckwith
- Produced by: Anthony Brandonisio; Daniela Taplin Lundberg; Tim Headington
- Starring: Ed Helms; Patti Harrison
- Cinematography: Frank Barrera
- Edited by: Annette Davey
- Music by: Alex Somers
- Production companies: Wild Idea; Stay Gold Features; Haven Entertainment; Kindred Spririt
- Distributed by: Bleecker Street (United States and Canada); Sony Pictures Worldwide Acquisitions (International)
- Release dates: January 31, 2021 (Sundance); April 23, 2021 (United States)
- Running time: 90 minutes
- Country: United States
- Language: English
- Budget: $1.2 million
- Box office: $1.4 million

Together Together is a 2021 American comedy-drama film written and directed by Nikole Beckwith. The film stars Ed Helms and Patti Harrison. It follows the friendship between a single man and the surrogate pregnant with his child. The film had its world premiere at the Sundance Film Festival on January 31, 2021, and was released on April 23, 2021, by Bleecker Street.

== Plot ==
Matt, an app developer in his forties, interviews Anna, a young coffee shop employee, to become his surrogate. He wants to become a dad without getting married and she wants to finance her bachelor's and master's degrees.

During her first trimester, the doctor tells Matt and Anna that everything is going well, so he invites Anna to dinner to celebrate. Afterwards, Matt tells his brother and parents about the pregnancy; his mother is unhappy about it.

At dinner, Matt and Anna talk about how nervous they are about conversing with each other. While ordering, he makes a disapproving sound when she orders potato over salad, as what she eats the baby eats. He orders pasta with bacon. Once the waitress leaves, Anna points out that he should also watch his diet for the child, as in his case it matters for the next 18+ years.

Next, at therapy together, Matt expresses excitement and wants to tell everybody, and is surprised Anna is not going to tell anyone about the pregnancy. Afterwards, Matt offers her a bite of candy, explaining he would do so after couple's therapy with his ex.

At the coffee shop, Matt brings pregnancy tea and clogs for Anna. She takes the tea, but leaves the clogs. When Matt takes them to Anna's, he meets a guy Anna hooked up with. He gets upset, believing it's bad for the baby. At the hospital, she insists he cannot stop her from having sex for a whole year, and pregnant women can safely have sex, which the technician confirms. They then happily listen to the heartbeat.

At therapy, Matt excitedly says he wants to hear that sound all the time, while Anna says she likes seeing him so happy. The therapist asks them if they are having any conflicts other than the clogs, and they talk about Matt's concern over Anna having sex. Although the therapist tries to clear his doubts, he remains skeptical.

During the second trimester, Anna tells Matt she needs money to get into an accelerated degree program to complete her bachelor's and master's degrees in three years. Matt shows her the future nursery, and she helps him pick the color for it. Next, both have a deep conversation about why they are alone.

They start hanging out more and choose the gender-neutral name "Lamp" for the baby. At the mall, seeking maternity wear, Anna meets her sister's friend and lies that she works there as she doesn't want her family to know she is pregnant, as they would disapprove.

Matt asks Anna to move in with him until the birth, as he wants to maximize his time with the baby. While crib shopping, the salesgirl calls them a couple, but Anna says, "Ew, no". This upsets Matt a little. Anna explains it would be gross if they were a couple, as he is twenty years older.

At the baby shower, Anna feels odd when Matt's mother says she's unrelated to the baby. Anna realizes that despite trying so hard not to, she is getting attached to the baby and Matt. She leaves his house afterwards, citing the importance of boundaries.

In the third trimester, Anna and Matt attend a prenatal class. After some days, Anna feels pain at night and calls Matt, fearing early labor. The doctor says she is okay and the baby is healthy but, she must remain off her feet on bed-rest for the remainder of the pregnancy to prevent a premature birth. After the visit, Anna admits she loves Matt platonically and doesn't want to lose him, but that she can't stay, as she got accepted to a Vermont college. Matt says they won't lose each other, as he loves her too and that he is proud of her for getting into college. Anna stays at Matt's house so he can care for her while she is on bed-rest.

This time, after attending therapy, Anna asks if Matt wants to hold hands and eat candy, which they do in the park on a bench. She starts having contractions one week before the due date. They do all the things they learned at the birth center and take Anna to the hospital, where she delivers baby Lamp. The movie ends with Matt consoling a crying Lamp as the camera lingers on Anna.

== Cast ==
- Ed Helms as Matt
- Patti Harrison as Anna
- Tig Notaro as Madeline
- Julio Torres as Jules
- Anna Konkle as Shayleen
- Timm Sharp as Jacob
- Evan Jonigkeit as Bryce
- Rosalind Chao as Dr. Andrews
- Sufe Bradshaw as Jean
- Greta Titelman as Charlotte
- Nora Dunn as Adele
- Fred Melamed as Marty
- May Calamawy as Carly

== Release ==
The film had its world premiere in the U.S. Dramatic Competition section of the Sundance Film Festival on January 31, 2021. Prior to this, Bleecker Street acquired the US distribution rights, while Sony Pictures Worldwide Acquisitions acquired the international distribution rights. It had a limited release on April 23, 2021, followed by video on demand on May 11, 2021.

== Reception ==
=== Critical response ===
On the review aggregator website Rotten Tomatoes, 90% of 156 critics' reviews are positive, with an average rating of 7.1/10. The website's consensus reads: "Together Together explores love and parenthood from unexpected angles, capturing a broad spectrum of emotions through Patti Harrison and Ed Helms' starring performances." Metacritic, which uses a weighted average, assigned the film a score of 70 out of 100, based on 32 critics, indicating "generally favorable" reviews.

=== Box office ===
With a limited release during the COVID-19 pandemic, Together Together grossed $1.4 million at the box office in the United States and Canada.
