= Problemista =

2023 film by Julio Torres

- Theatrical release poster
- Directed by: Julio Torres
- Written by: Julio Torres
- Produced by: Julio Torres; Dave McCary; Ali Herting; Emma Stone
- Starring: Tilda Swinton; Julio Torres; RZA; Greta Lee; Catalina Saavedra; James Scully
- Cinematography: Fredrik Wenzel
- Edited by: Sara Shaw; Jacob Schulsinger
- Music by: Lia Ouyang Rusli
- Production company: Fruit Tree
- Distributed by: A24
- Release dates: March 14, 2023 (SXSW); March 1, 2024 (United States)
- Running time: 105 minutes
- Country: United States
- Languages: English; Spanish
- Box office: $2.7 million

Problemista is a 2023 American surrealist comedy-drama film written, directed, and co-produced by Julio Torres in his feature directorial debut. The film stars Tilda Swinton, Torres, RZA, Greta Lee, Catalina Saavedra, James Scully, and Isabella Rossellini. Its plot follows a struggling aspiring toy designer from El Salvador who starts working for an erratic art-world outcast in New York City, hoping to stay in the country and realize his dream before his work visa expires.

Problemista had its world premiere at South by Southwest on March 14, 2023, and was released in the United States by A24 on March 1, 2024.

== Plot ==
As a child in El Salvador, Alejandro is raised by his mother Dolores, an artist who encourages his imagination, despite her recurring dream of her son facing unknown dangers in a cave. As an adult, Alejandro lives in Bushwick, New York City, and struggles to achieve his dream of designing toys at Hasbro. He applies to Hasbro's internship program with ideas such as smartphones for Cabbage Patch Kids, but is rejected.

Alejandro takes a job as an archivist at FreezeCorp, a company that cryogenically freezes artists despite lacking the technology to revive them. He is tasked with monitoring the body and work of Bobby, a painter of large-scale portraits of eggs, who froze himself in hopes of future success. Inspired by Bobby's ambition, Alejandro continues to brainstorm new toy concepts, but accidentally unplugs the cryogenic chamber's backup generator, resulting in his termination. Facing deportation, Alejandro has 30 days to find a new sponsor for his work visa.

He encounters Bobby's wife Elizabeth, an eccentric art critic who hires him as her assistant. She promises sponsorship once they have organized an exhibition of Bobby's work, and Alejandro struggles to navigate Elizabeth's volatile temper and erratic demands. Immigration restrictions prevent him from being paid without a sponsor, forcing him to sublet his own bedroom and find precarious, cash-based jobs on Craigslist to cover the high visa fees. Meanwhile, Dolores struggles with feeling unable to help her son.

Elizabeth introduces another assistant, Bingham, who secretly does not respect her and whose presence jeopardizes Alejandro's position. Alejandro and Elizabeth locate twelve of Bobby's thirteen paintings, but he gave his final egg to Dalia, his former student; they had an affair, and a jealous Elizabeth damaged Dalia's career with a scathing review. Alejandro writes a heartfelt apology on Elizabeth's behalf, leading to Dalia's tearful acceptance and return of the painting.

While Alejandro shows the paintings to potential galleries, Elizabeth discovers that he has not updated her needlessly complicated filing system. She humiliates him over the phone, as he visualizes her as an angry dragon in a cave, and demands he ship her physical copies overnight. Unable to pay the shipping fees, Alejandro discovers his bank account has a negative balance, and argues with a representative on the phone about punishing overdraft fees. Desperate, he accepts a Craigslist offer for sex work, performing for a cleaning boy fetishist, and later learns that Hasbro has profited from one of his toy designs.

Alejandro's immigration lawyer offers him a job as a paralegal, but he learns that he has secured a solo show for Bobby at a Roosevelt Island gallery. Elizabeth initially derides the location, but Alejandro stands up to her in a dream-like battle between dragon and knight, making her realize they share the same devotion to Bobby's legacy. Taking the cable car to the show, they realize they have forgotten a painting, and Elizabeth berates the conductor into turning around to retrieve it. They arrive at the gallery to find they have only been afforded a single wall, but successfully sell all of Bobby's paintings.

In a moment of vulnerability, Elizabeth shows her gratitude and loneliness to Alejandro, who commends her bravery and perseverance. He calls his mother, who confesses that by trying to protect him, she inadvertently pushed him away and became creatively stuck. As she waits for his response, Elizabeth interrupts with a voice message: she has decided to freeze herself to join Bobby in the future. Elizabeth thanks Alejandro, expresses that she will miss him, and reveals the name of the Hasbro executive who stole his idea, urging him to stand up for himself and pursue his dream.

Empowered by Elizabeth's message, Alejandro confronts the executive, securing a new job and proper sponsorship. Dolores is reassured by her son's newfound confidence, freeing her from her creative block. Centuries later, Elizabeth and Bobby are reawakened from cryogenic preservation, as is the elderly Alejandro, who became a renowned toymaker, and he and Elizabeth are reunited.

== Cast ==
- Julio Torres as Alejandro, an immigrant toy maker
- Tilda Swinton as Elizabeth, an artist and Alejandro's employer
- RZA as Bobby, Elizabeth's late husband
- Isabella Rossellini as the narrator
- Catalina Saavedra as Dolores, Alejandro's mother
- James Scully as Bingham, Elizabeth's secondary assistant
- Laith Nakli as Khalil, an immigration officer
- Spike Einbinder as Spray, Alejandro's roommate
- Greta Lee as Dalia, Bobby's apprentice
- Larry Owens as Craigslist, a personification of the website
- Kelly McCormack as Sharon, a FreezeCorp representative
- Greta Titelman as Celeste, Elizabeth's former employee
- Martine Gutierrez as gallerist
- Megan Stalter as Lili
- Charlene Incarnate as MC, an art studio organizer
- Theo Maltz as Travis, who rents Alejandro's room

== Production ==
In July 2021, it was announced that Tilda Swinton would star in the film and Julio Torres would costar in and direct it, from a screenplay he wrote, with A24 set to finance and distribute. In November 2021, RZA, Isabella Rossellini, Greta Lee, Spike Einbinder, Laith Nakil, Larry Owens, James Scully, and Greta Titelman joined the cast. Emma Stone serves as a producer under her Fruit Tree banner.

Principal photography began in November 2021 in New York City.

== Release ==
The film had its world premiere at 2023 South by Southwest Film & TV Festival on March 13, 2023. It was scheduled to be released in the United States on August 4, 2023, before it was delayed due to the 2023 SAG-AFTRA strike. It was eventually rescheduled to be released on March 1, 2024.

== Critical response ==
On review aggregator Rotten Tomatoes, the film holds an approval rating of 85% based on 136 reviews. The website's critics consensus reads: "With Problemista, Julio Torres' utterly unique sensibilities prove a perfectly cracked lens through which to find the surreal humor in bleak aspects of the human experience." Metacritic, which uses a weighted average, assigned the film a score of 68 out of 100, based on 30 critic reviews, indicating "generally favorable" reviews.

The New York Times considered Problemista a fantastically and visually extravagant exploration of systemic inequality, with Julio Torres's signature eccentricity balanced by a newfound willingness to tell a relatable story. The film draws on Torres's own immigration struggles, blending absurd visual metaphors with biting social commentary. Tilda Swinton’s portrayal of Elizabeth, a venomous and domineering art critic, was highlighted as a standout performance, described as both frightful and mesmerizing. The review lauded the film's ability to juxtapose playful absurdity with the harsh realities of bureaucracy and economic precarity, ultimately framing Elizabeth's rejection of impersonal modern systems as a rebellious, albeit overwhelming, battle cry.

Christian Urrutia of El Tecolote referred to Problemista as a rare portrayal of a Salvadoran immigrant, calling it a “quirky and whimsical journey” that challenges typical immigration narratives. The review highlighted the film's surreal humor, comparing it to Terry Gilliam’s work, while addressing serious themes like the “dystopian power dynamics” between employers and immigrant workers. Tilda Swinton’s Elizabeth is described as a “true problemista,” whose unhinged antics force Alejandro to realize that “sometimes you need to create problems to find new solutions.”

According to Peter Bradshaw of The Guardian Problemista is a quirky, overly stylized film that struggles under its excesses. Julio Torres's portrayal of Alejandro is marked by a “weird marionette-bobbing motion,” while the film's charm often feels forced, like “the filmic equivalent of a decaf oat latte with a sprinkling of vegan gummy bears.” Tilda Swinton's performance as the abrasive Elizabeth is the film's saving grace, but even she can't fully redeem the implausible, “insufferable” tone, which leaves the film feeling more like a collection of whimsical moments than a cohesive narrative.

NPR included Problemista on its list of the best movies and TV of 2024, with critic Glen Weldon writing, "The comedy targets are broad – institutions like banks, credit card companies, and the U.S. immigration system – but the jokes themselves are precise and perfect".

== Awards ==
Problemista has received six nominations and won one award.

- 2023 South by Southwest Film & TV Festival: Nominated for the Audience Award: Headliners – Julio Torres.
- 2024 International Online Cinema Awards (INOCA): Won the Halfway Award for Best Supporting Actress – Tilda Swinton; nominated for Best Original Screenplay – Julio Torres.
- 2024 Guild of Music Supervisors Awards: Maggie Baron was nominated for Best Music Supervision for a Trailer (Film).
- 2024 La Roche-sur-Yon International Film Festival: Nominated for the Grand Prix du Jury: Compétition internationale – Julio Torres.
- 2025 Film Independent Spirit Awards: Nominated for Best First Feature (director Julio Torres; producers Ali Herting, Dave McCary, and Emma Stone) and Best First Screenplay – Julio Torres.

Award	Date of ceremony	Category	Recipient(s)	Result	Ref.
Independent Spirit Awards	February 22, 2025	Best First Feature	Julio Torres, Ali Herting, Dave McCary, and Emma Stone	Nominated	
Independent Spirit Awards	February 22, 2025	Best First Screenplay	Julio Torres	Nominated	
