= Macula Dog =

American experimental band

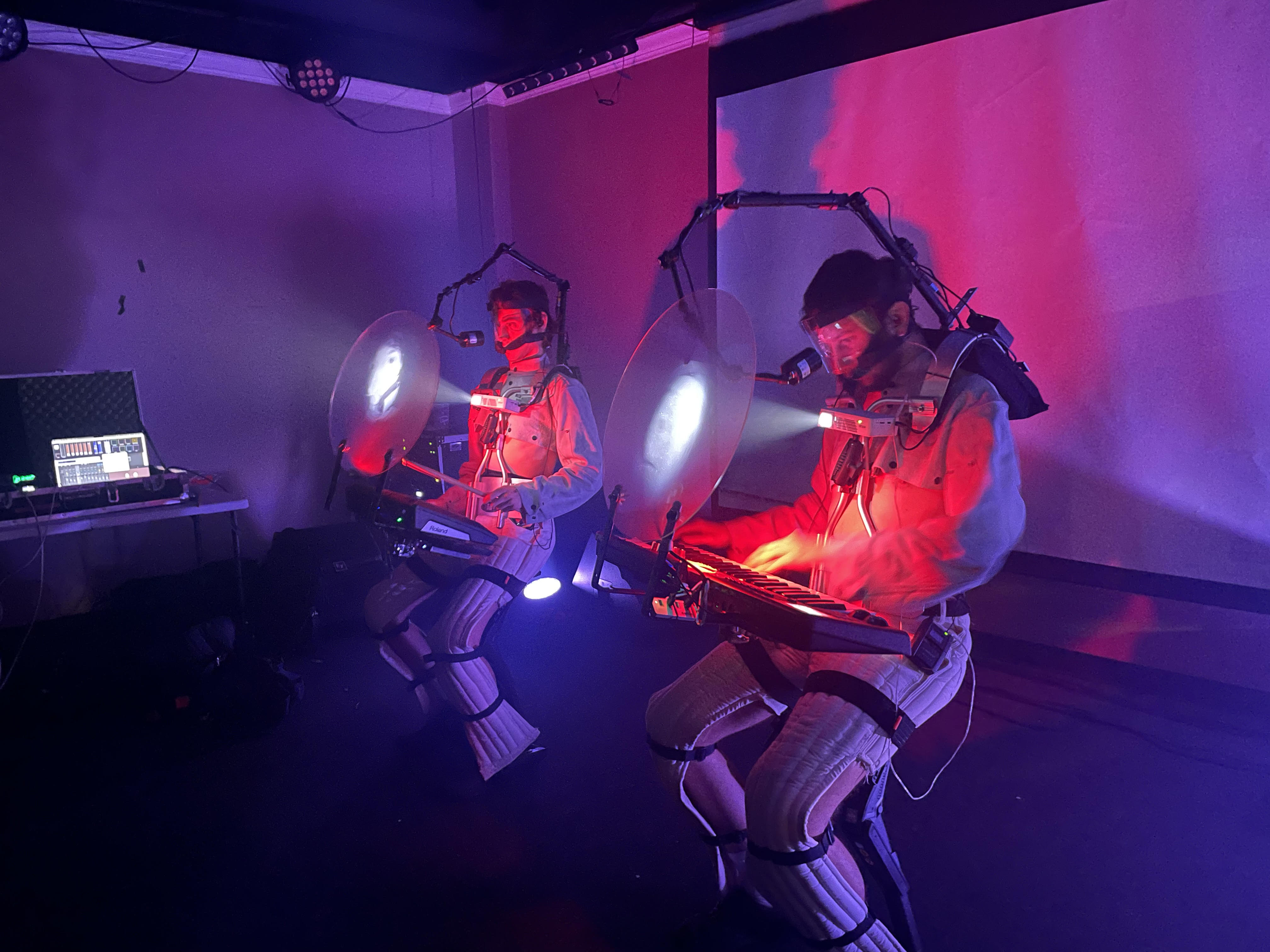
- Macula Dog playing the Crown, Baltimore (2023)

Background information
- Origin: New York, New York, U.S.
- Genres: Experimental pop; experimental; electronica
- Years active: 2015-present
- Labels: HAORD Records; Wharf Cat Records
- Members: Ben Mendelewicz; Matt Cutler

Macula Dog are an experimental band from New York City formed in 2014 by Ben Mendelewicz and Matt Cutler. They are best known for their style of electronic music as well as their live performances.

They have appeared on WNYU's New Afternoon Show, Know Wave Radio, The Special Without Brett Davis, and Adult Swim's FishCenter Live. They have also provided themes for Adult Swim's Live Crossword Puzzle Show. Their live set was covered in The New Yorker, they were featured in Vice's Noisey, and their album Orange 2 was given a 7.7 rating by Pitchfork.

== History ==
Ben Mendelewicz and Matt Cutler met sometime in the 2000s in West Palm Beach, Florida. Their first musical project was a ska band that they played in while in middle school, where Cutler played trombone and Mendelewicz played drums. Mendelewicz would begin writing songs under the name Tumbleweave in 2009, and would enlist Cutler to help with recording and playing live. Within the same year, Mendelewicz would move to New York City to begin college. Around the same time, Cutler moved to Sarasota, Florida for college and started performing as Drut PD. The two would still perform live as a pair whenever both were home from school throughout 2011 and 2012. In 2013, they would release a split of their solo work under both Drut PD and Tumbleweave as the first release under Haord Records, a label founded and ran by the two of them due to a lack of interest from established labels. Their first release as Macula Dog, Macula Dog, would release on March 28 of 2015 under Haord Records. Since then, they have released 2 EPs, 2 albums, and 1 remix EP.

== Style ==
=== Auditory ===
Macula Dog's music has been described as "clattering electronic synth music." Pitchfork described their album Orange 2 as being "equally nauseating and joyous," and as being "delirious [and] queasy." The band makes heavy usage of irregular rhythms, samples, and distorted vocals. To record their sound, they record samples onto a drum pads and keyboards, and alternate samples between one another, resulting in what Mendelewicz describes as "convoluted loops."

Their lyricism tends to revolve around topics such as "warp-speed" consumerism, industry, business, modernity, misinformation, and technology. The single "Lawnmower" from their debut album Why Do You Look Like Your Dog? and the single "Plug" from Orange 2 are the only songs by Macula Dog to have their lyrics publicly released, with the lyrics for "Plug" being released in a lyric video.

=== Visual ===
Over their career, Macula Dog have made use of various costumes and live setups in their performances. During live shows, Mendelewicz plays an electronic drum kit or drum pad, and Cutler plays synths. Both provide vocals.

==== Early performances (2015) ====
Macula Dog's first costumes consisted of masks, pink shirts, black pants with grey tubes, and most notably, mannequins. Both members had mannequins on their shoulders, and the mannequins wore the members' costumes. During this period, Mendelewicz would adopt the stage name Bruce Brothers, while Cutler alternated between Mark Brothers and Mark Matthews. The mannequins adopted their first names, Ben and Matt. Occasionally, they would refer to the mannequins as actual members, sometimes describing themselves as a "four-person duo," or in some instances, as just a four piece band.

These costumes appear in the music video for "Purchase Power Station", and are on the covers for their Macula Dog EP and Why Do You Look Like Your Dog?

==== Natural Dog / Breezy (2017–2019) ====
The next set of costumes would be used in the years leading to the release of, and for the release of, the Breezy EP. The costumes featured spiky black wigs, bell bottom pants, long-sleeved jackets, and masks. The pants, masks, and trim of the jacket had a black light effect. Both members also had cameras attached to their heads, suspended from their wigs. The feed of these cameras would be displayed on the walls of the venue while performing via miniature projectors strapped to their heads.

These costumes appear in the cover for Breezy, as well as its promotional photos and in the video for the track "Breezy".

==== Orange 2 (2022-present) ====
The most recent set of costumes feature the duo carrying their instruments with modified Pearl Drums marching snare carriers, wearing impact-resistant clothing and protective masks in case of injury, and wearing bionic wearable chairs to allow them to sit and rest while performing. This setup also features camera feeds of their faces, this time displayed on circular plastic shields attached to their instruments, designed to mimic holograms. Due to their instruments being attached to them and the addition of the wearable chairs, they are able to stand up or sit down, and walk around the performing space freely, at times separating completely from one another.

These costumes appear in the cover for Orange 2, as well as its promotional photos and videos.

== Discography ==
Macula Dog have released 2 albums, 3 EPs, 1 remix EP, and have been featured on 2 compilations.

=== Studio albums ===
- Why Do You Look Like Your Dog? (2016)
- Orange 2 (2022)

=== Extended plays ===
- Macula Dog (2015)
- Natural Dog (2017)
- Breezy (2020)
- Neosporin Remixes (2023)

=== Compilations ===
- Baking Bread Again - Eclectic Sessions Volume 2 (2016)
- Smart Man Do - Haord 2 (2020)
