= Soft core =

Soft core or Softcore may refer to:

- Softcore microprocessor, microprocessor implemented using logic synthesis and perhaps other circuits
- Soft core (synthesis), a digital circuit that can be wholly implemented using logic synthesis
- Softcore pornography, erotic film or photograph that is less sexually explicit than hardcore
- "Softcore" (song), by The Neighbourhood, 2018
