= Ana Fabrega =

American comedian

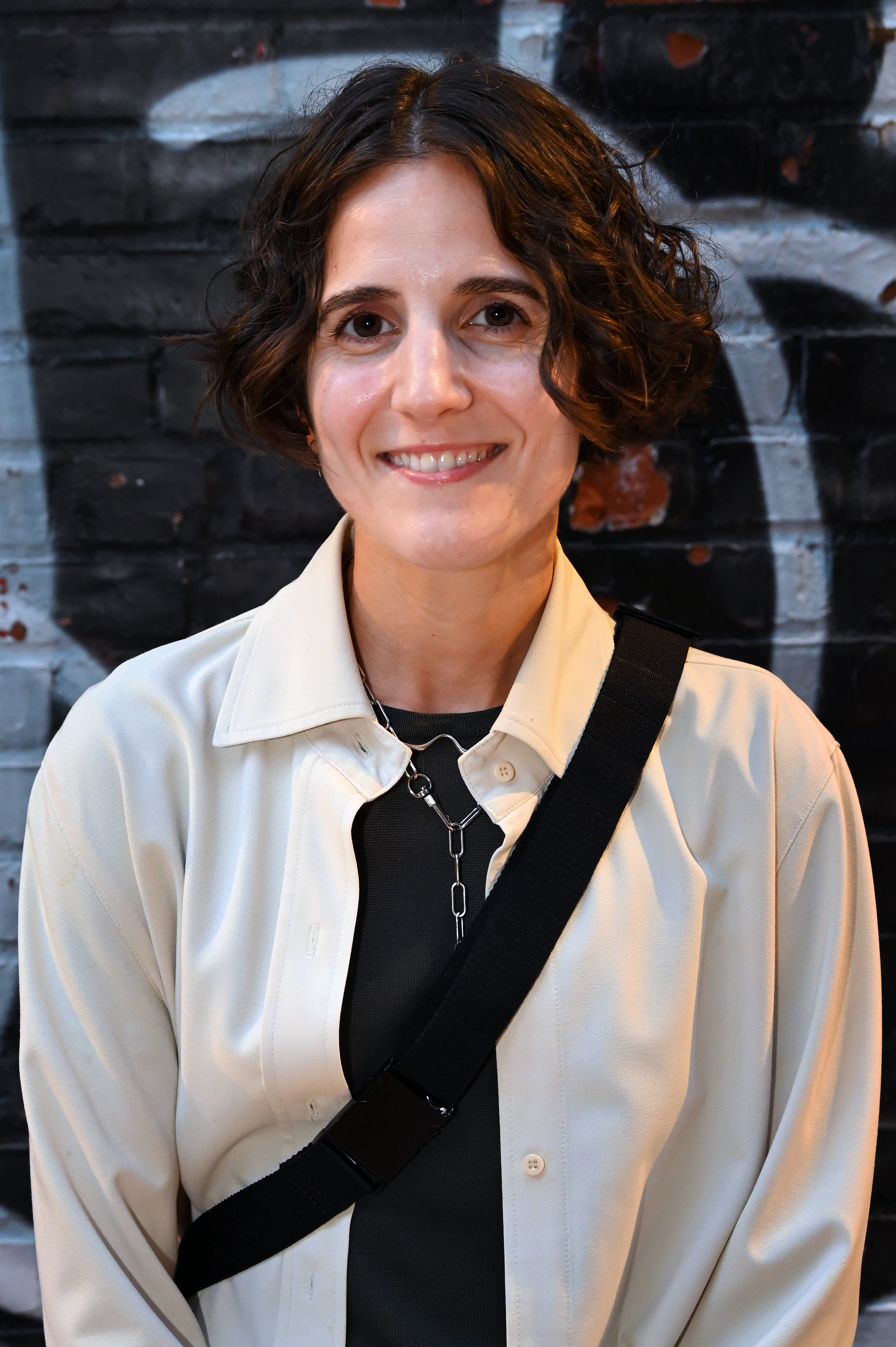
- Fabrega in 2025
- Born: 1991 (age 34–35); Arizona, U.S.
- Education: Fordham University

Comedy career
- Years active: 2015–present
- Medium: Stand-up; television
- Genres: Sketch comedy; surreal humor

Ana Fabrega (born 1991) is an American comedian. She is best known for her work as a writer, showrunner, and actor on the HBO series Los Espookys.

== Early life and education ==
Ana Fabrega was born in 1991 in Arizona, where she grew up in Scottsdale. Her parents had immigrated to the United States from Panama.

She studied economics and business at Fordham University in New York, and remained in the city after graduating.

== Career ==
After college, Fabrega worked in finance. She began doing comedy on the side, posting videos online and doing stand-up at open mics. She also garnered a following on Twitter.

She transitioned to working part-time, then quit her job and began working full-time in comedy, including as an actor on At Home with Amy Sedaris and as a writer on The Chris Gethard Show.

Fabrega was named a Just for Laughs New Face in 2017, and she was included on Vulture's list of Best New Up-and-coming Comedians to Watch in 2018.

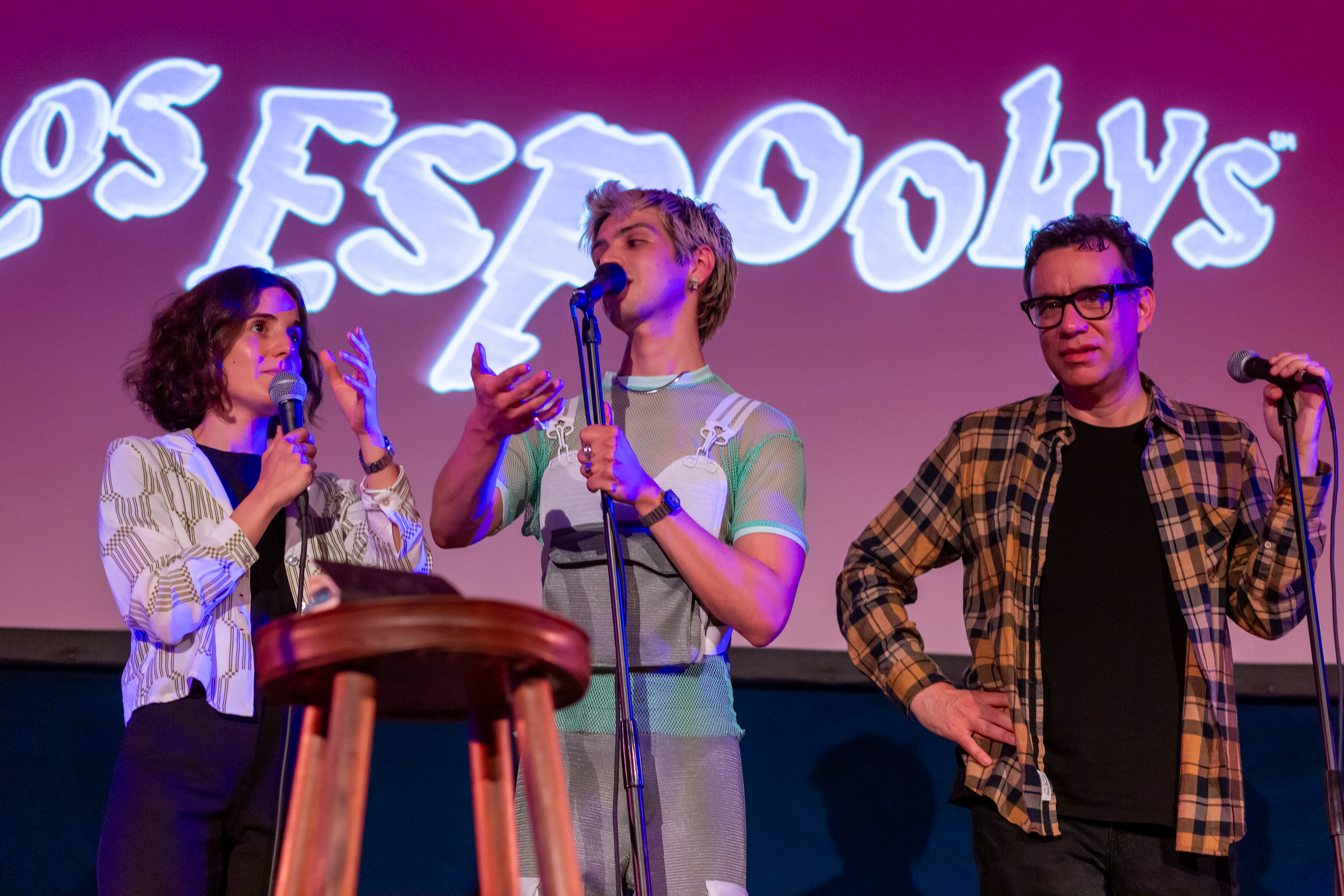
Ana Fabrega, Julio Torres and Fred Armisen perform "Los Espookys Live" on June 29, 2019, in Brooklyn, NY.

In 2016, she had started occasionally working with the comedian Fred Armisen after having applied to work on his show Portlandia. When Armisen successfully pitched an idea for a new Spanish-language comedy series to HBO, he recruited Fabrega and fellow New York comedian Julio Torres to co-write and produce the show, Los Espookys. In addition to working as a writer and showrunner on Los Espookys, which Fabrega describes as "a show in an unnamed fictional Latin American country about a group of friends who make horror for people who need it," she plays the character Tati. The first season of Los Espookys aired in 2019. The show was renewed for a second season later that year. Filming was delayed due to the COVID-19 pandemic, but production on season 2 wrapped in early 2022.

In 2022, Fabrega appeared as Vanessa in the film Father of the Bride.

== Personal life ==
Fabrega is a self-described "queer, vegan democratic socialist."

== Filmography ==
=== Television ===
Year	Title	Role	Notes
2016	The Jim Gaffigan Show	Amanda	1 episode
2017	Portlandia	Lead singer	1 episode
2015–2017	The Special Without Brett Davis	Various	Writer, appeared in 22 episodes
2017–2018	The Chris Gethard Show	Various	Writer, appeared in 2 episodes
2019	High Maintenance	Corinne T.	1 episode
2019–2022	Los Espookys	Tati	Creator, writer, actor, executive producer, 12 episodes
2017–2020	At Home with Amy Sedaris	Esther	11 episodes
2023	History of the World, Part II	Sacrificial Virgin	1 episode
2024	Fantasmas	Trish	1 episode

=== Film ===
Year	Title	Role	Notes
2020	Inspector Ike	Deputy Hawthorne	
2022	Father of the Bride	Vanessa	
