= Julio Torres =

Salvadoran writer and comedian (born 1987)

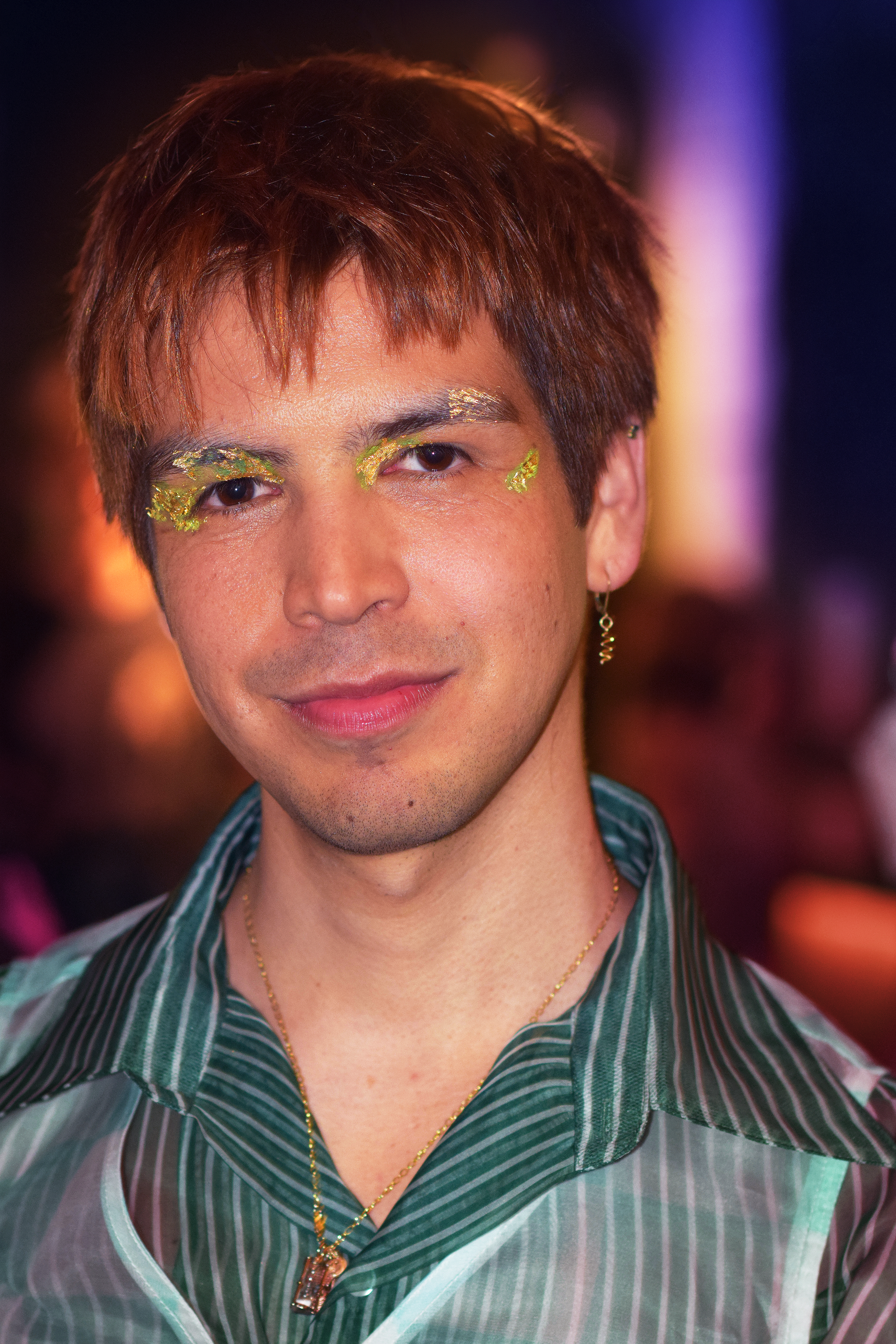
- Torres in 2024
- Born: February 11, 1987 (age 39); San Salvador, El Salvador
- Education: The New School (BA)
- Occupations: comedian; writer; actor
- Years active: 2012–present

Julio Torres (born February 11, 1987) is a Salvadoran writer, comedian, and actor. He is the co-creator, writer, and executive producer of the HBO series Los Espookys and Fantasmas. Both of Torres' HBO series won a Peabody Award. He previously wrote for The Chris Gethard Show on truTV, and wrote for Saturday Night Live from 2016 to 2019. He directed, wrote, and starred in the surrealist comedy film Problemista.

== Early life and education ==
Torres was born on February 11, 1987, in San Salvador, El Salvador. His father, Julio, is a civil engineer and his mother, Tita, is an architect and fashion designer. His grandmother was told by a fortune teller that one of her descendants would be successful in New York City which his mother believed to be Torres.

He grew up during the last years of the Salvadoran Civil War and remembers hiding under the dining table with his mother; however, he describes his childhood as idyllic. Torres grew up in an apartment above his mother's clothing store where she would sew both his and his sister's clothes. He had few friends in his youth and spent his time creating elaborate stories for Barbies and miniature toy cars. When Torres was 11, his grandfather died and Torres moved with his family to a farmhouse outside the city, where his mother had grown up, after his mother's clothing store went out of business.

Torres attended a private high school in San Salvador after he and his sister received scholarships. After high school, he enrolled in a two-year advertising program and later worked at an ad agency. He made a presentation to his relatives to convince them to pay for Torres to attend college in New York and moved to Manhattan in 2009 after applying to Eugene Lang College of Liberal Arts at The New School a second time with a scholarship. Torres majored in English literature while he also studied playwriting, graduating in 2011.

== Career ==
Torres worked as a writer on The Chris Gethard Show. He worked at SNL from 2016 to 2019, writing sketches including "Papyrus" and "Wells for Boys". He was nominated for four Emmys as a member of the SNL writing team. He has appeared on The Tonight Show and other late-night programs. His comedy is frequently described by critics as "otherworldly" and "surrealist," with elements of the fantastical and a melancholy undercurrent. After pitching a Spanish-language comedy to HBO, the comedian Fred Armisen brought Torres and Ana Fabrega on to co-write the series. Armisen and Torres had met when the former hosted SNL. Torres was also a co-showrunner and actor on the project, which became Los Espookys. The first season aired in 2019, and it was renewed for a second season later that year. Torres plays Andrés, a wealthy heir who searches for answers about his mysterious past.

Following Los Espookys, Torres wrote, directed, and starred in the HBO series Fantasmas. Both Los Espookys and Fantasmas were honored with Peabody Awards.

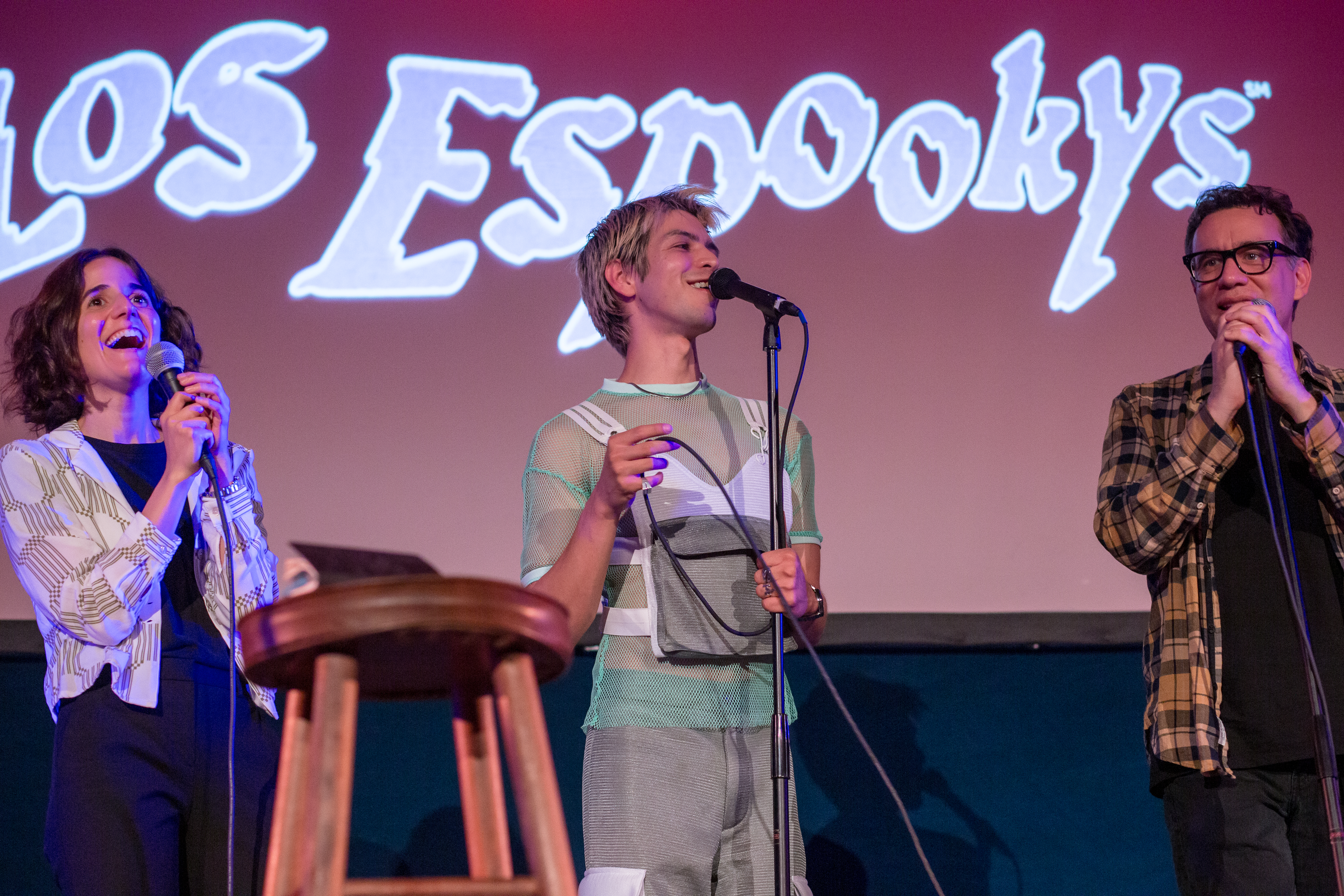
Ana Fabrega, Julio Torres and Fred Armisen at "Los Espookys Live" on June 29, 2019

His comedy special My Favorite Shapes premiered August 10, 2019, on HBO. It was directed by his frequent collaborator Dave McCary and produced by Fred Armisen and Lorne Michaels. Torres played the gay barista Jules in the 2021 comedy film Together Together. His first feature film, Problemista, was released in the United States released by A24 on March 1, 2024. Torres wrote and directed the film, a surrealist comedy in which he portrays Alejandro, a Salvadoran creative struggling to succeed in New York City before his work visa expires, alongside Tilda Swinton.

In 2024, Ryan Gosling asked Torres to return to SNL with a sequel to "Papyrus". Although cut for time during Gosling's live episode, "Papyrus 2" was later released online in full. Also that year, the Society of LGBTQ Entertainment Critics presented Torres with its Wilde Wit award, an homage to Oscar Wilde that celebrates "a performer, writer, or commentator whose observations both challenge and amuse."

On March 27, 2026, a comedy special based on Torres' stage show Color Theories was released on HBO.

His mother and his sister, a designer, have collaborated with him on comedy projects. He says he has always wanted to pursue a career in writing for comedy.

== Personal life ==
Torres is gay. He said in June 2020, "I never want to claim to speak for anybody else's experience. I am not here representing immigrants. I am not here representing Salvadorians, or Hispanics, or gay people. I can only share what's in me and that may or may not ring true with people, but I have never wanted to use any of those things as a calling card."

Torres is in a relationship with actor James Scully.

He is vegan.

== Filmography ==
=== Film ===
Year	Title	Role	Notes
2019	My Favorite Shapes by Julio Torres	Self	Also writer and executive producer
2021	Together Together	Jules	
2023	Problemista	Alejandro	Also writer and director
2023	Nimona	Diego the Squire (voice)	
2023	Millennial Hunter	Chaz AF (voice)	
2024	Boys Go to Jupiter	T-bone/Gas Station Guy/Brontosaurus (voice)	
2026	Color Theories		HBO Original
2026	La bola negra	Juan Pablo	

=== Television ===
Year	Title	Role	Notes
2015–2016	The Chris Gethard Show	Self	2 episodes
2015–2016	The Special Without Brett Davis	Various roles	6 episodes
2016	Horace and Pete	Young hipster	Episode #1.1
2016	The Jim Gaffigan Show	QED MC	Episode: "The List"
2016	High Maintenance	Art school kid 2	Episode: "Tick"
2017–2019	The Tonight Show Starring Jimmy Fallon	Correspondent	8 episodes
2017–2019	Late Night with Seth Meyers	Self	3 episodes
2017	Comedy Central Stand-Up Presents	Self	Episode: "Julio Torres"
2018	The Shivering Truth	Dale (voice)	Episode: "Ogled Inklings"
2019	The Other Two	Jordan	Episode: "Chase Turns Fourteen"
2019–2022	Los Espookys	Andrés Valdez	Main role, also writer and executive producer
2021	Bob's Burgers	Rodrigo (voice)	Episode: "Y Tu Tina También"
2021	Shrill	Ricochet	3 episodes
2021	Ziwe	Self	Episode: "Immigration"
2021	Tuca & Bertie	(voice)	Episode: "Sleepovers"
2021–2023	The Great North	Crispin Cienfuegos (voice)	15 episodes
2022	Search Party	Quique	Episode: "Kings"
2024	Fantasmas	Julio Torres	Also executive producer, writer, director

=== Web ===
Year	Title	Role	Notes
2025	The Real Me	Radio DJ	Guest Appearance
