= Ikechukwu Ufomadu =

American comedian

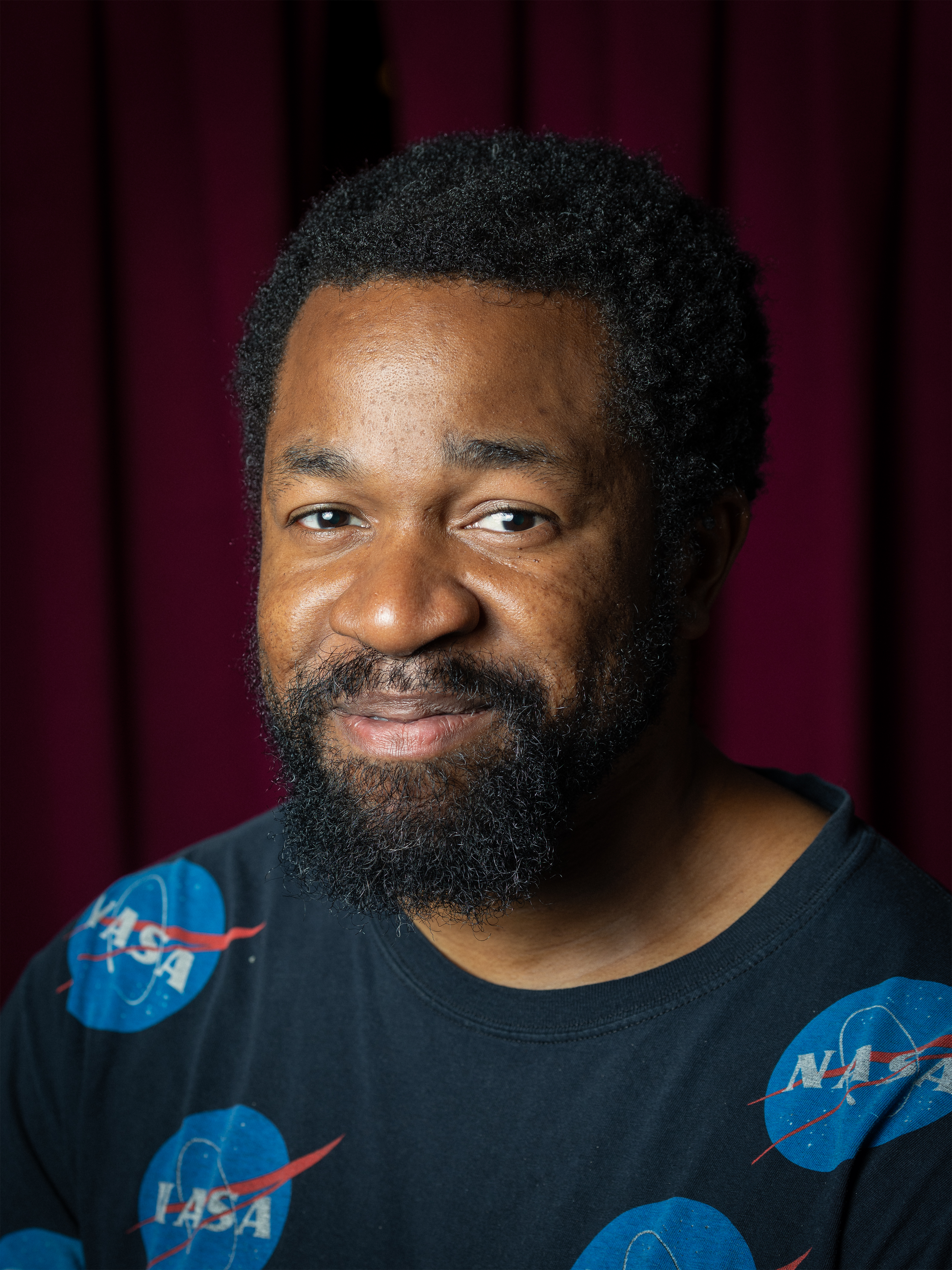
- Ufomadu in 2026
- Other name: Ike Ufomadu
- Education: New York University (BFA)
- Occupations: Comedian; actor; writer
- Website: www.ikehimself.com

Ikechukwu "Ike" Ufomadu is an American comedian, actor, and writer. In 2022, he was nominated for a Primetime Emmy Award for Outstanding Actor in a Short Form Series for his work on Cake.

== Career ==
Ufomadu studied drama at the Tisch School of the Arts of New York University, where he graduated with a Bachelor of Fine Arts in 2008.

Ufomadu has performed comedy in shows throughout New York City. His deadpan style has been described as "so slow, so dry and so demanding of your attention". He often puts on, in his words, an "old-school entertainment type" persona harkening back to the mid-20th century. In 2015, he hosted Ike at Night, a live-theater series in the style of talk shows like The Tonight Show Starring Johnny Carson. It featured a comedic opening monologue and guest interviews with an "emphasis on politics and multicultural issues". Later "Ike" shows included Nightcap by Ike, Ike's Wonderful World of Leisure, Ike by Chance, and Ike for the Holidays, several of which were staged at Joe's Pub in Manhattan.

In 2018, Ufomadu acted in Clare Barron's off-Broadway play Dance Nation; he was part of the original cast that received a Drama Desk Award for Outstanding Ensemble. Ben Brantley of The New York Times commended Ufomadu's "appealing, low-key presence" in the female-led play.

Inspector Ike, a low-budget detective comedy film inspired by Columbo, was released in 2020. Paste magazine wrote that the title character was "skillfully played straight-faced" by Ufomadu, who co-wrote the film with director Graham Mason. Ufomadu voiced Dr. Ike Bloom on Tooning Out the News, an animated satirical news show produced by Stephen Colbert, beginning in 2020. In May 2021, Ufomadu appeared in an episode of Flatbush Misdemeanors.

Ufomadu and Mason contributed the recurring segment "Words with Ike" to the fifth season of FXX's short-form comedy anthology Cake in 2021. Vulture wrote that the vocabulary-exploring segment "drives home a feeling that Ufomadu loves comedy because he loves language". For "Words with Ike", Ufomadu was nominated for a Primetime Emmy Award for Outstanding Actor in a Short Form Comedy or Drama Series at the 74th Primetime Emmy Awards.

The comedian appeared on six episodes of Showtime's talk show Ziwe in 2022. Vulture included Ufomadu on its list of 24 "Comedians You Should and Will Know in 2022".

== Filmography ==
=== Film ===
Year	Title	Role	Director	Notes
2017	The Photos of Ana	Ike	Graham Mason	Short
2017	Yanvalou	The Man	Angeline Gragasin	Short
2019	Dad & Step-Dad 3	Principal Anderson	Tynan DeLong	
2020	Pee Pee Manor	Mr.Greeley	Todd Oldham	Short
2020	Inspector Ike	Inspector Ike	Graham Mason	
2021	Judas and the Black Messiah	Walter Hicks	Shaka King	
2023	I TRY	Unnamed Role	Elias ZX	Short
2023	Gold and Mud	Tuxedo	Conor Dooley	Short
2023	Our Home Out West	Sheriff	Drew Tobia	TV Special
2024	Your Monster	Don	Caroline Lindy	
2024	A Joyful Process	Joe	Alex Goldberg	Short
2024	The French Italian	Joe Mangione	Rachel Wolther	
2025	The Scout	Lance	Paula Andrea Gonzalez-Nasser	
2025	Noah Britton: The Best Stuff I’ve Ever Done	Self	Noah Britton, Arie Katz	
2026	Little Doors	Unnamed Role	Anthony Oberbeck	
2026	7 Piano Sketches	Unnamed Role	Graham Mason	Short
2026	Stamptown	Self	Rachel Lee Goldenberg	
