= List of Emma Stone performances =

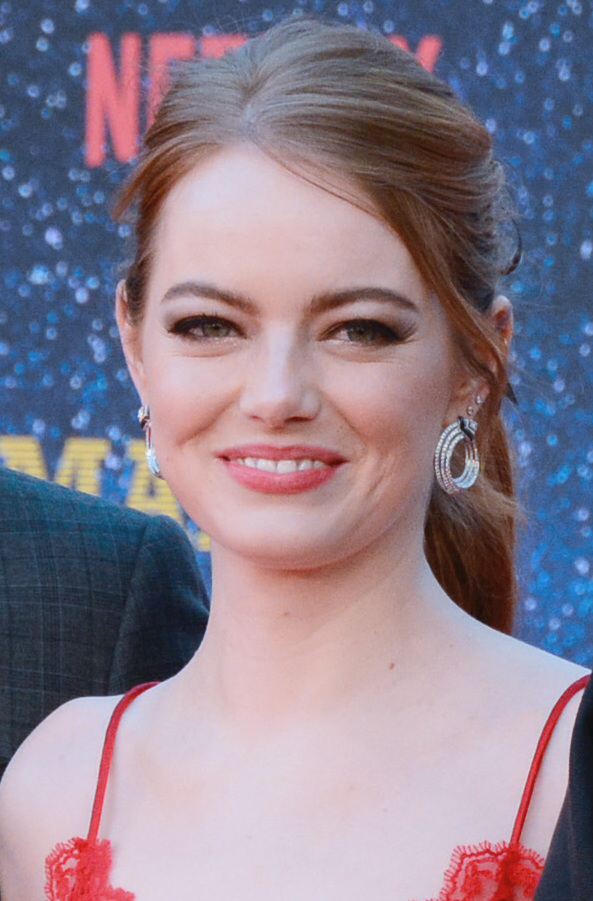
Stone at the UK premiere of Maniac in 2018

Emma Stone is an American actress who aspired to an acting career from an early age. She had her first role onstage at age 11, and followed with parts in 16 plays in a regional theater in Arizona. Stone made her television debut in the unsold pilot for the reality show The New Partridge Family (2005). After brief television roles in Medium, Malcolm in the Middle, and Lucky Louie, she made her film debut in the comedy Superbad (2007).

Stone appeared as a socially awkward sorority sister in 2008's "The House Bunny," and as a ghost in Ghosts of Girlfriends Past (2009). Later in 2009, she found commercial success with the horror comedy Zombieland. Her breakthrough came with her first leading role as a high school student perceived to be sexually promiscuous in the comedy Easy A (2010). In 2011, she starred in the romantic comedy Crazy, Stupid, Love and in the period drama The Help, which were both commercial successes. Stone's success continued with her role as Gwen Stacy in the 2012 superhero film The Amazing Spider-Man that became her highest-grossing release, with a worldwide revenue of $757 million, and she later reprised the role in its 2014 sequel. Critical success followed with her performance as a recovering drug addict in Alejandro González Iñárritu's black comedy-drama Birdman (2014). It earned her a nomination for the Academy Award for Best Supporting Actress. Later that year, she made her Broadway debut in a revival of the musical Cabaret.

Stone won the Academy Award for Best Actress for her performance as an aspiring actress in Damien Chazelle's musical La La Land (2016). She also recorded six songs such as "City of Stars" for the film's soundtrack. She served as an executive producer and starred in the Netflix black comedy miniseries Maniac (2018), and received another Oscar nomination for her portrayal of Abigail Masham in Yorgos Lanthimos' period black comedy The Favourite (2018). She then starred in the sequel Zombieland: Double Tap (2019), portrayed the title role in the crime comedy Cruella (2021), and established the production company Fruit Tree, under which she began producing independent films such as Jesse Eisenberg's directorials When You Finish Saving the World (2022) and A Real Pain (2024). In 2023, Stone reunited with Lanthimos in the acclaimed fantasy film Poor Things, which she also produced, winning another Academy Award for Best Actress in addition to a nomination for Best Picture.

== Film ==
Key
†	Denotes films that have not yet been released

=== As actress ===
Year	Title	Role	Notes	Ref(s)
2007	Superbad	Jules		
2008	The Rocker	Amelia Stone		
2008	The House Bunny	Natalie Sandler		
2009	Ghosts of Girlfriends Past	Allison Vandermeersh		
2009	Paper Man	Abby		
2009	Zombieland	Wichita / Krista		
2010	Marmaduke	Mazie	Voice	
2010	Easy A	Olive Penderghast		
2011	Friends with Benefits	Kayla		
2011	Crazy, Stupid, Love	Hannah Weaver		
2011	The Help	Eugenia "Skeeter" Phelan		
2012	The Amazing Spider-Man	Gwen Stacy		
2013	Gangster Squad	Grace Faraday		
2013	Movie 43	Veronica	Segment: "Veronica"	
2013	The Croods	Eep Crood	Voice	
2014	The Amazing Spider-Man 2	Gwen Stacy		
2014	Magic in the Moonlight	Sophie Baker		
2014	Birdman or (The Unexpected Virtue of Ignorance)	Sam Thomson		
2014	The Interview	Herself	Cameo	
2015	Aloha	Allison Ng		
2015	Irrational Man	Jill Pollard		
2016	Popstar: Never Stop Never Stopping	Claudia Cantrell	Uncredited cameo	
2016	La La Land	Amelia "Mia" Dolan		
2017	Battle of the Sexes	Billie Jean King		
2018	The Favourite	Abigail Masham		
2019	Zombieland: Double Tap	Wichita / Krista		
2020	The Croods: A New Age	Eep Crood	Voice	
2021	Cruella	Estella / Cruella de Vil	Also executive producer	
2022	Bleat	Woman	Short film	
2023	Poor Things	Bella Baxter	Also producer	
2024	Kinds of Kindness	Rita / Liz / Emily		
2025	Eddington	Louise Cross		
2025	Bugonia	Michelle Fuller	Also producer	
2027	The Catch	TBA	Filming; Also producer	

=== As producer only ===
Year	Title	Credit	Ref(s)
2022	When You Finish Saving the World	Producer	
2023	Problemista	Producer	
2024	I Saw the TV Glow	Producer	
2024	A Real Pain	Producer	
2026	The Debut	Producer	

== Television ==
Year	Title	Role	Notes	Ref(s)
2004	The New Partridge Family	Laurie Partridge	Pilot; credited as Emily Stone	
2005	Medium	Cynthia McCallister	Episode: "Sweet Dreams"; credited as Riley Stone	
2006	The Suite Life of Zack & Cody	Ivana Tipton	Voice; episode: "Crushed"; credited as Emily Stone	
2006	Malcolm in the Middle	Diane	Episode: "Lois Strikes Back"	
2006	Lucky Louie	Shannon	Episode: "Get Out"	
2007	Drive	Violet Trimble	7 episodes	
2010–2023	Saturday Night Live	Herself (host) / Various characters	8 episodes (host of 5 episodes)	
2011	Robot Chicken	Various voices	2 episodes	
2012	30 Rock	Herself	Episode: "The Ballad of Kenneth Parcell"	
2012	iCarly	Heather	Episode: "iFind Spencer Friends"	
2016	Maya & Marty	Herself	Episode: "Sean Hayes, Steve Martin, Kelly Ripa & Emma Stone"	
2018	Maniac	Annie Landsberg	10 episodes; also executive producer	
2019	My Favorite Shapes by Julio Torres	Shoe	Television film; Voice	
2019	The Mind, Explained	Narrator	Documentary; season 1 (5 episodes)	
2021	Saturday Morning All Star Hits!	Heather (voice)	5 episodes	
2023–2024	The Curse	Whitney Siegel	10 episodes; also executive producer	
2024	Fantasmas	Genevieve	Episode: "The Void"; also executive producer	
2025	The Yogurt Shop Murders	—N/a	Documentary; executive producer	

== Theater ==
Year	Title	Role	Venue	Ref.
2014–2015	Cabaret	Sally Bowles (replacement)	Studio 54, Broadway	

== Discography ==
Year	Title	Album	Ref.
2008	"I Know What Boys Like"	The House Bunny	
2010	"Knock on Wood"	Easy A	
2016	"Turn Up the Beef" (The Lonely Island featuring Emma Stone)	Popstar: Never Stop Never Stopping	
2016	"The Christmas Candle" (Saturday Night Live Cast featuring Emma Stone)	Non-album single	
2016	"Another Day of Sun"	La La Land: Original Motion Picture Soundtrack	
2016	"Someone in the Crowd"	La La Land: Original Motion Picture Soundtrack	
2016	"A Lovely Night"	La La Land: Original Motion Picture Soundtrack	
2016	"City of Stars"	La La Land: Original Motion Picture Soundtrack	
2016	"Audition (The Fools Who Dream)"	La La Land: Original Motion Picture Soundtrack	
2016	"City of Stars (Humming)"	La La Land: Original Motion Picture Soundtrack	
2023	"Fully Naked in New York" (Saturday Night Live Cast featuring Emma Stone)	Non-album single	

== Music videos ==
Year	Title	Artist	Ref.
2015	"Anna"	Will Butler	
2018	"Who Cares"	Paul McCartney	
2025	"Beth's Farm"	Jerskin Fendrix	

== Video games ==
Year	Title	Voice role	Notes	Ref.
2012	Sleeping Dogs	Amanda Cartwright	Also motion capture	

== See also ==
- List of awards and nominations received by Emma Stone
