= List of awards and nominations received by Emma Stone =

Emma Stone awards and nominations
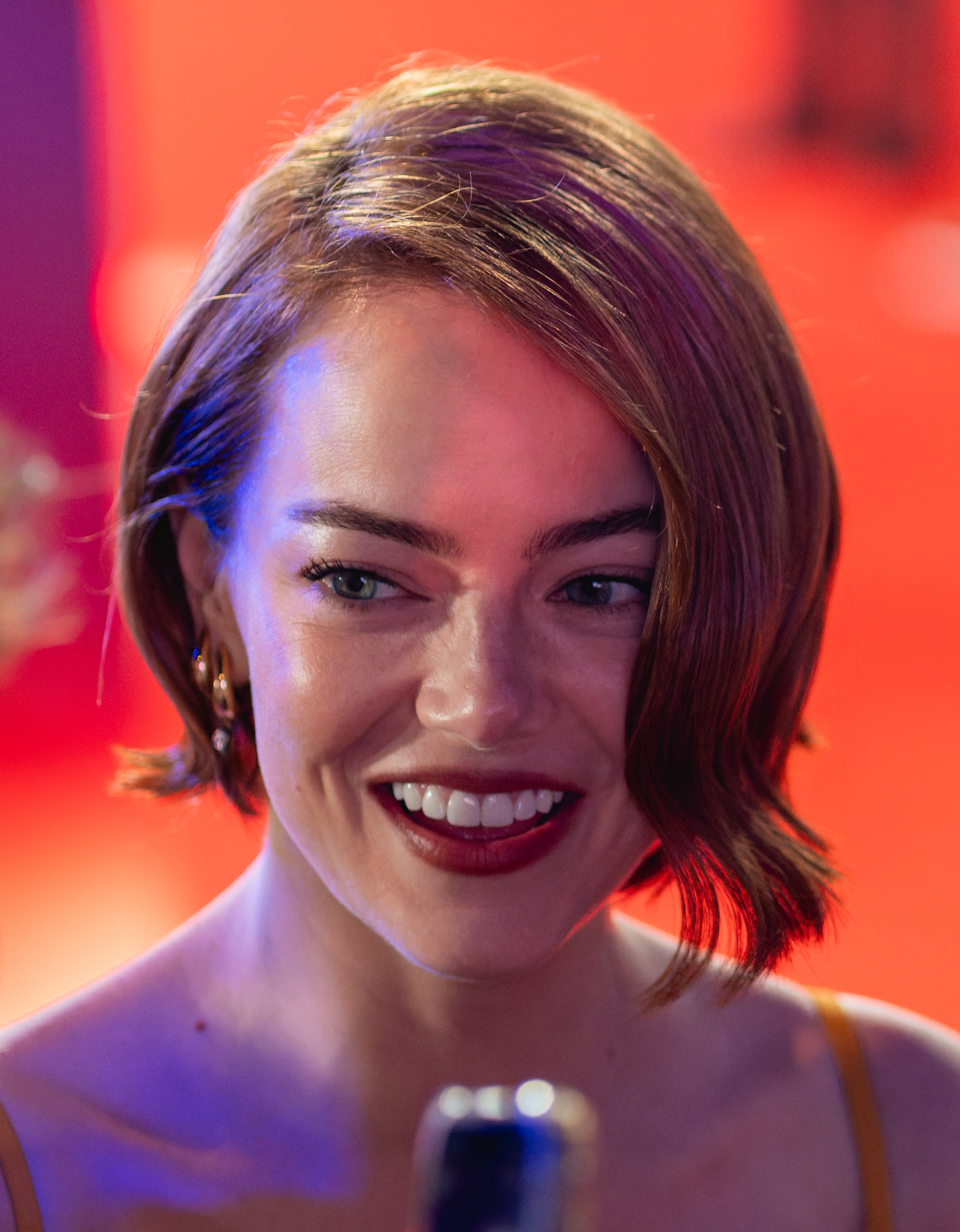
- Stone in 2025
Awards and nominations
| Award | Wins | Nominations |
| Academy Awards | 2 | 7 |
| Actor Awards | 3 | 8 |
| BAFTA Awards | 2 | 8 |
| Critics' Choice Awards | 5 | 15 |
| Golden Globes | 2 | 9 |
| Emmy Awards | 0 | 1 |

Totals (Note: Certain award groups do not simply award one winner. They acknowledge several different recipients, have runners-up, and have third place. Since this is a specific recognition and is different from losing an award, runner-up mentions are considered wins in this award tally. For simplification and to avoid errors, each award in this list has been presumed to have had a prior nomination.)
- Wins: 114
- Nominations: 302

Emma Stone is an American actress who has received several awards including two Academy Awards, two BAFTA Awards, five Critics' Choice Awards, two Golden Globe Awards, three Screen Actors Guild Awards, and a prize from the Venice Film Festival as well as a nomination for a Primetime Emmy Award. She has also received two MTV Movie Awards, a People's Choice Award, and three Teen Choice Awards.

Stone won the Academy Award for Best Actress twice for her roles as aspiring actress in Damien Chazelle's musical romance drama La La Land (2016) and a young woman resurrected by a scientist in the Yorgos Lanthimos science fantasy film Poor Things (2023), the later of which also earned her a nomination for the Academy Award for Best Picture as one of the a producers on the film. She was previously Oscar-nominated for the Academy Award for Best Supporting Actress for her performance as a recovering drug addict in Alejandro González Iñárritu's black comedy-drama Birdman (2014), and for her portrayal of Abigail Masham in Lanthimos's absurdist period black comedy The Favourite (2018).

She started her career playing high school student in Superbad (2007), a woman trying to survive the apocalypse in the horror comedy film Zombieland (2009), and a rebellious highschooler in the teen comedy Easy A (2010), the later of which earned her nominations for the BAFTA Rising Star Award and the Golden Globe Award for Best Actress in a Musical or Comedy. Her role was also included in Time's list of "Top 10 Everything of 2010". Stardom came with the romantic comedy-drama Crazy, Stupid, Love, the period drama The Help (2011) and for her portrayal of Gwen Stacy in The Amazing Spider-Man (2012) and its 2014 sequel. She gained critical acclaim for her role in Birdman (2014) as well as nominations for the Academy Award, BAFTA Award, Golden Globe Award, and Screen Actors Guild Award for Best Supporting Actress.

She continued to garner acclaim for her leading performance in the musical La La Land (2016) for which she won the Academy Award, the BAFTA Award, the Golden Globe Award, the Screen Actors Guild Award, and the Volpi Cup for Best Actress. She played Billie Jean King in the sports drama Battle of the Sexes (2017) where she earned nominations for the Golden Globe Award and the Critics' Choice Movie Award. For The Favourite she was nominated for the Academy Award, BAFTA Award, Golden Globe Award, and Screen Actors Guild Award for Best Supporting Actress. For her role in Poor Things she won the Academy Award, BAFTA Award, Critics' Choice Movie Award and Golden Globe Award.

On television, she played a woman with borderline personality disorder in the Netflix psychological dark comedy miniseries Maniac (2018) earning a nomination for the Screen Actors Guild Award for Outstanding Actress in a Miniseries or Television Movie, and a HGTV host in the Showtime satirical thriller series The Curse (2023) for which she was nominated for the Golden Globe Award for Best Actress – Television Series Drama.

== Major associations ==
=== Academy Awards ===
| Year | Category | Nominated work | Result | Ref. |
|---|---|---|---|---|
| 2015 | Best Supporting Actress | Birdman | Nominated | |
| 2017 | Best Actress | La La Land | Won | |
| 2019 | Best Supporting Actress | The Favourite | Nominated | |
| 2024 | Best Picture | Poor Things | Nominated | |
| 2024 | Best Actress | Poor Things | Won | |
| 2026 | Best Picture | Bugonia | Nominated | |
| 2026 | Best Actress | Bugonia | Nominated | |

=== Actor Awards ===
| Year | Category | Nominated work | Result | Ref. |
|---|---|---|---|---|
| 2012 | Outstanding Cast in a Motion Picture | The Help | Won | |
| 2015 | Outstanding Cast in a Motion Picture | Birdman or (The Unexpected Virtue of Ignorance) | Won | |
| 2015 | Outstanding Female Actor in a Supporting Role | Birdman or (The Unexpected Virtue of Ignorance) | Nominated | |
| 2017 | Outstanding Female Actor in a Leading Role | La La Land | Won | |
| 2019 | Outstanding Female Actor in a Miniseries or Television Movie | Maniac | Nominated | |
| 2019 | Outstanding Female Actor in a Supporting Role | The Favourite | Nominated | |
| 2024 | Outstanding Female Actor in a Leading Role | Poor Things | Nominated | |
| 2026 | Outstanding Female Actor in a Leading Role | Bugonia | Nominated | |

=== BAFTA Awards ===
| Year | Category | Nominated work | Result | Ref. |
British Academy Film Awards
| 2011 | BAFTA Rising Star Award | | Nominated | |
| 2015 | Best Actress in a Supporting Role | Birdman or (The Unexpected Virtue of Ignorance) | Nominated | |
| 2017 | Best Actress in a Leading Role | La La Land | Won | |
| 2019 | Best Actress in a Supporting Role | The Favourite | Nominated | |
| 2024 | Best Film | Poor Things | Nominated | |
| 2024 | Outstanding British Film | Poor Things | Nominated | |
| 2024 | Best Actress in a Leading Role | Poor Things | Won | |
| 2026 | Best Actress in a Leading Role | Bugonia | Nominated | |

=== Critics' Choice Awards ===
| Year | Category | Nominated work | Result | Ref. |
Critics' Choice Movie Awards
| 2012 | Best Acting Ensemble | The Help | Won | |
| 2015 | Best Acting Ensemble | Birdman or (The Unexpected Virtue of Ignorance) | Won | |
| 2015 | Best Supporting Actress | Birdman or (The Unexpected Virtue of Ignorance) | Nominated | |
| 2017 | Best Actress | La La Land | Nominated | |
| 2018 | Best Actress in a Comedy Movie | Battle of the Sexes | Nominated | |
| 2019 | Best Acting Ensemble | The Favourite | Won | |
| 2019 | Best Supporting Actress | The Favourite | Nominated | |
| 2024 | Best Picture | Poor Things | Nominated | |
| 2024 | Best Actress | Poor Things | Won | |
| 2026 | Best Picture | Bugonia | Nominated | |
| 2026 | Best Actress | Bugonia | Nominated | |
Critics' Choice Super Awards
| 2024 | Best Science Fiction/Fantasy Movie | Poor Things | Nominated | |
| 2024 | Best Actress in a Fantasy or Science Fiction Movie | Poor Things | Won | |
| 2026 | Best Science Fiction/Fantasy Movie | Bugonia | Nominated | |
| 2026 | Best Actress in a Fantasy or Science Fiction Movie | Bugonia | Nominated | |

=== Emmy Awards ===
| Year | Category | Nominated work | Result | Ref. |
Primetime Emmy Awards
| 2026 | Outstanding Documentary Or Nonfiction Series | The Yogurt Shop Murders | Nominated | |

=== Golden Globe Awards ===
| Year | Category | Nominated work | Result | Ref. |
|---|---|---|---|---|
| 2011 | Best Actress in a Motion Picture – Musical or Comedy | Easy A | Nominated | |
| 2015 | Best Supporting Actress – Motion Picture | Birdman or (The Unexpected Virtue of Ignorance) | Nominated | |
| 2017 | Best Actress in a Motion Picture – Musical or Comedy | La La Land | Won | |
| 2018 | Best Actress in a Motion Picture – Musical or Comedy | Battle of the Sexes | Nominated | |
| 2019 | Best Supporting Actress – Motion Picture | The Favourite | Nominated | |
| 2022 | Best Actress in a Motion Picture – Musical or Comedy | Cruella | Nominated | |
| 2024 | Best Actress in a Motion Picture – Musical or Comedy | Poor Things | Won | |
| 2024 | Best Actress in a Television Series – Drama | The Curse | Nominated | |
| 2026 | Best Actress in a Motion Picture – Musical or Comedy | Bugonia | Nominated | |

=== Venice Film Festival ===
| Year | Category | Nominated work | Result | Ref. |
|---|---|---|---|---|
| 2016 | Volpi Cup for Best Actress | La La Land | Won | |

== Other awards and nominations ==
| Organizations | Year | Category | Work | Result | Ref. |
|---|---|---|---|---|---|
| AACTA Awards | 2015 | Best Supporting Actress – International | Birdman or (The Unexpected Virtue of Ignorance) | Nominated | |
| AACTA Awards | 2017 | Best Lead Actress – International | La La Land | Won | |
| AACTA Awards | 2024 | Best Film – International | Poor Things | Nominated | |
| AACTA Awards | 2024 | Best Lead Actress – International | Poor Things | Nominated | |
| British Independent Film Awards | 2018 | Best Supporting Actress | The Favourite | Nominated | |
| Capri Hollywood International Film Festival | 2016 | Best Actress | La La Land | Won | |
| Capri Hollywood International Film Festival | 2025 | Best Actress | Bugonia | Won | |
| The Comedy Awards | 2011 | Best Comedy Actress – Film | Easy A | Nominated | |
| The Comedy Awards | 2012 | Best Comedy Actress – Film | Crazy, Stupid, Love | Nominated | |
| Dorian Awards | 2017 | Film Performance of the Year – Actress | La La Land | Nominated | |
| Dorian Awards | 2019 | Supporting Film Performance of the Year – Actress | The Favourite | Nominated | |
| Dorian Awards | 2024 | Film Performance of the Year – Actress | Poor Things | Nominated | |
| Gotham Awards | 2018 | Special Jury Award for Best Ensemble Performance | The Favourite (shared with Olivia Colman, and Rachel Weisz) | Won | |
| Gotham Awards | 2023 | Best International Feature | Poor Things | Nominated | |
| Gotham Awards | 2025 | Best Feature | Bugonia | Nominated | |
| Gotham Awards | 2026 | Best Feature | The Debut | Pending | |
| Hollywood Film Awards | 2011 | Hollywood Ensemble Award | The Help | Won | |
| Independent Spirit Awards | 2015 | Best Supporting Female | Birdman or (The Unexpected Virtue of Ignorance) | Nominated | |
| Independent Spirit Awards | 2025 | Best Feature | I Saw the TV Glow (shared with Ali Herting, Sam Intili, Dave McCary, and Sarah Winshall) | Nominated | |
| Independent Spirit Awards | 2025 | Best First Feature | Problemista (shared with Julio Torres, Ali Herting, and Dave McCary) | Nominated | |
| Independent Spirit Awards | 2025 | Best New Scripted Series | Fantasmas (shared with Julio Torres, Dave McCary, Olivia Gerke, Alex Bach, and Daniel Powell) | Nominated | |
| Irish Film & Television Academy Awards | 2017 | Best International Actress | La La Land | Won | |
| Irish Film & Television Academy Awards | 2024 | Best International Actress | Poor Things | Won | |
| MTV Movie & TV Awards | 2011 | Best Female Performance | Easy A | Nominated | |
| MTV Movie & TV Awards | 2011 | Best Comedic Performance | Easy A | Won | |
| MTV Movie & TV Awards | 2011 | Best Line from a Movie (shared with Amanda Bynes) | Easy A | Nominated | |
| MTV Movie & TV Awards | 2012 | Best Female Performance | Crazy, Stupid, Love | Nominated | |
| MTV Movie & TV Awards | 2012 | Best Kiss (shared with Ryan Gosling) | Crazy, Stupid, Love | Nominated | |
| MTV Movie & TV Awards | 2012 | Best On-Screen Duo | The Help (shared with Viola Davis, Bryce Dallas Howard, Octavia Spencer, and Jessica Chastain) | Nominated | |
| MTV Movie & TV Awards | 2012 | Trailblazer Award | — | Won | |
| MTV Movie & TV Awards | 2015 | Best Kiss | The Amazing Spider-Man 2 (shared with Andrew Garfield) | Nominated | |
| MTV Movie & TV Awards | 2015 | Best Female Performance | Birdman or (The Unexpected Virtue of Ignorance) | Nominated | |
| MTV Movie & TV Awards | 2017 | Best Kiss | La La Land (shared with Ryan Gosling) | Nominated | |
| MTV Movie & TV Awards | 2017 | Best Musical Moment | La La Land (shared with Ryan Gosling) | Nominated | |
| National Board of Review Award | 2012 | Best Acting by an Ensemble Cast | The Help | Won | |
| NAACP Image Award | 2012 | Outstanding Actress in a Motion Picture | The Help | Nominated | |
| NewNowNext Award | 2011 | Brink of Fame | — | Nominated | |
| Nickelodeon Kids' Choice Awards | 2015 | Favorite Movie Actress | The Amazing Spider-Man 2 | Won | |
| Nickelodeon Kids' Choice Awards | 2021 | Favorite Voice from an Animated Movie | The Croods: A New Age | Nominated | |
| Nickelodeon Kids' Choice Awards | 2022 | Favorite Movie Actress | Cruella | Nominated | |
| Palm Springs International Film Festival | 2017 | Vanguard Award | La La Land (shared with Damien Chazelle, and Ryan Gosling) | Won | |
| Palm Springs International Film Festival | 2024 | Desert Palm Achievement Award – Actress | Poor Things | Won | |
| People's Choice Awards | 2012 | Favorite Movie Actress | The Help | Won | |
| People's Choice Awards | 2013 | Favorite Movie Actress | The Amazing Spider-Man | Nominated | |
| People's Choice Awards | 2013 | Favorite Face of Heroism | The Amazing Spider-Man | Nominated | |
| People's Choice Awards | 2013 | Favorite On-Screen Chemistry (shared with Andrew Garfield) | The Amazing Spider-Man | Nominated | |
| People's Choice Awards | 2014 | Favorite Dramatic Movie Actress | Gangster Squad | Nominated | |
| People's Choice Awards | 2015 | Favorite Dramatic Movie Actress | Birdman or (The Unexpected Virtue of Ignorance) | Nominated | |
| People's Choice Awards | 2015 | The Amazing Spider-Man 2 | Favorite Movie Actress | Nominated | |
| People's Choice Awards | 2015 | The Amazing Spider-Man 2 | Favorite Movie Duo (shared with Andrew Garfield) | Nominated | |
| People's Choice Awards | 2021 | The Drama Movie Star of 2021 | Cruella | Nominated | |
| Producers Guild Awards | 2019 | Outstanding Producer of Limited Series Television | Maniac | Nominated | |
| Producers Guild Awards | 2024 | Outstanding Producer of Theatrical Motion Pictures | Poor Things | Nominated | |
| Producers Guild Awards | 2025 | Outstanding Producer of Theatrical Motion Pictures | A Real Pain | Nominated | |
| Producers Guild Awards | 2026 | Outstanding Producer of Theatrical Motion Pictures | Bugonia | Nominated | |
| Santa Barbara International Film Festival | 2017 | Outstanding Performer of the Year Award | La La Land | Won | |
| Satellite Awards | 2011 | Best Cast in a Film | The Help | Won | |
| Satellite Awards | 2015 | Best Supporting Actress in a Film | Birdman or (The Unexpected Virtue of Ignorance) | Nominated | |
| Satellite Awards | 2017 | Best Actress in a Film | La La Land | Nominated | |
| Satellite Awards | 2018 | Best Actress in a Film | Battle of the Sexes | Nominated | |
| Satellite Awards | 2019 | Best Cast in a Film | The Favourite | Won | |
| Satellite Awards | 2019 | Best Supporting Actress in a Film | The Favourite | Nominated | |
| Satellite Awards | 2019 | Best Actress in a Miniseries or Television Film | Maniac | Nominated | |
| Satellite Awards | 2024 | Best Actress in a Motion Picture, Comedy or Musical | Poor Things | Won | |
| Satellite Awards | 2025 | Best Actress in a Television Series – Musical or Comedy | The Curse | Won | |
| Saturn Awards | 2015 | Best Supporting Actress in a Film | Birdman or (The Unexpected Virtue of Ignorance) | Nominated | |
| Saturn Awards | 2022 | Best Actress in a Film | Cruella | Nominated | |
| Scream Awards | 2010 | Best Ensemble | Zombieland | Won | |
| Scream Awards | 2010 | Best Horror Actress | Zombieland | Nominated | |
| Spike Guys' Choice Awards | 2011 | Hot and Funny | Emma Stone | Nominated | |
| Spike Guys' Choice Awards | 2012 | Hot and Funny | Emma Stone | Won | |
| Spike Guys' Choice Awards | 2014 | Hottest Emma | Emma Stone | Won | |
| Spike Video Game Awards | 2012 | Best Performance by a Female | Sleeping Dogs | Nominated | |
| Teen Choice Awards | 2010 | Choice Movie Actress: Comedy | Zombieland | Nominated | |
| Teen Choice Awards | 2011 | Choice Movie Actress: Romantic Comedy | Easy A | Won | |
| Teen Choice Awards | 2012 | Choice Movie Actress: Comedy | Crazy, Stupid, Love | Won | |
| Teen Choice Awards | 2012 | Choice Movie: Liplock (shared with Ryan Gosling) | Crazy, Stupid, Love | Nominated | |
| Teen Choice Awards | 2012 | Choice Summer Movie Star: Female | The Amazing Spider-Man | Nominated | |
| Teen Choice Awards | 2012 | Choice Movie Actress: Drama | The Help | Won | |
| Teen Choice Awards | 2014 | Choice Movie Actress: Sci-Fi/Fantasy | The Amazing Spider-Man 2 | Nominated | |
| Teen Choice Awards | 2014 | Choice Movie: Liplock (shared with Andrew Garfield) | The Amazing Spider-Man 2 | Nominated | |
| Teen Choice Awards | 2015 | Choice Movie Actress: Comedy | Aloha | Nominated | |
| Young Hollywood Awards | 2008 | Exciting New Face | Superbad | Won | |
| Young Hollywood Awards | 2014 | Favorite Actress | The Amazing Spider-Man 2 | Nominated | |
| Young Hollywood Awards | 2014 | Best On-Screen Couple (shared with Andrew Garfield) | The Amazing Spider-Man 2 | Nominated | |

== Critics associations awards ==
| Year | Organizations | Category | Work | Result | Ref. |
|---|---|---|---|---|---|
| 2009 | Detroit Film Critics Society | Best Ensemble | Zombieland | Nominated | |
| 2011 | Detroit Film Critics Society | Best Ensemble | The Help | Nominated | |
| 2011 | San Diego Film Critics Society | Best Performance by an Ensemble | The Help | Nominated | |
| 2011 | Washington D.C. Area Film Critics Association | Best Ensemble | The Help | Nominated | |
| 2011 | Women Film Critics Circle | Best Ensemble | The Help | Won | |
| 2012 | Alliance of Women Film Journalists | Best Ensemble | The Help | Nominated | |
| 2014 | New York Film Critics Online | Best Ensemble Cast | Birdman or (The Unexpected Virtue of Ignorance) | Won | |
| 2014 | Boston Society of Film Critics | Best Supporting Actress | Birdman or (The Unexpected Virtue of Ignorance) | Won | |
| 2014 | Boston Society of Film Critics | Best Ensemble | Birdman or (The Unexpected Virtue of Ignorance) | Runner-up | |
| 2014 | Dallas–Fort Worth Film Critics Association | Best Supporting Actress | Birdman or (The Unexpected Virtue of Ignorance) | 2nd place | |
| 2014 | Washington D.C. Area Film Critics Association | Best Ensemble | Birdman or (The Unexpected Virtue of Ignorance) | Won | |
| 2014 | Washington D.C. Area Film Critics Association | Best Supporting Actress | Birdman or (The Unexpected Virtue of Ignorance) | Nominated | |
| 2014 | St. Louis Film Critics Association | Best Supporting Actress | Birdman or (The Unexpected Virtue of Ignorance) | Nominated | |
| 2014 | San Diego Film Critics Society | Best Supporting Actress | Birdman or (The Unexpected Virtue of Ignorance) | Nominated | |
| 2014 | San Diego Film Critics Society | Best Ensemble | Birdman or (The Unexpected Virtue of Ignorance) | Won | |
| 2014 | Chicago Film Critics Association | Best Supporting Actress | Birdman or (The Unexpected Virtue of Ignorance) | Nominated | |
| 2014 | San Francisco Bay Area Film Critics Circle | Best Supporting Actress | Birdman or (The Unexpected Virtue of Ignorance) | Nominated | |
| 2014 | Florida Film Critics Circle | Best Supporting Actress | Birdman or (The Unexpected Virtue of Ignorance) | Runner-up | |
| 2014 | Florida Film Critics Circle | Best Cast | Birdman or (The Unexpected Virtue of Ignorance) | Nominated | |
| 2014 | Detroit Film Critics Society | Best Supporting Actress | Birdman or (The Unexpected Virtue of Ignorance) | Nominated | |
| 2014 | Detroit Film Critics Society | Best Ensemble | Birdman or (The Unexpected Virtue of Ignorance) | Nominated | |
| 2015 | Houston Film Critics Society | Best Supporting Actress | Birdman or (The Unexpected Virtue of Ignorance) | Nominated | |
| 2015 | London Film Critics' Circle | Best Supporting Actress | Birdman or (The Unexpected Virtue of Ignorance) | Nominated | |
| 2016 | Washington D.C. Area Film Critics Association | Best Actress | La La Land | Nominated | |
| 2016 | Houston Film Critics Society | Best Actress | La La Land | Nominated | |
| 2016 | St. Louis Film Critics Association | Best Actress | La La Land | Nominated | |
| 2016 | Dallas–Fort Worth Film Critics Association | Best Actress | La La Land | 2nd place | |
| 2016 | Chicago Film Critics Association | Best Actress | La La Land | Nominated | |
| 2016 | Detroit Film Critics Society | Best Actress | La La Land | Won | |
| 2016 | Alliance of Women Film Journalists | Best Actress | La La Land | Nominated | |
| 2016 | Florida Film Critics Circle | Best Actress | La La Land | Runner-up | |
| 2016 | San Diego Film Critics Society | Best Actress | La La Land | Runner-up | |
| 2017 | Online Film Critics Society | Best Actress | La La Land | Nominated | |
| 2017 | Seattle Film Critics Society | Best Actress in a Leading Role | La La Land | Nominated | |
| 2017 | Georgia Film Critics Association | Best Actress | La La Land | Nominated | |
| 2017 | London Film Critics' Circle | Actress of the Year | La La Land | Nominated | |
| 2017 | Dublin Film Critics' Circle | Best Actress | Battle of the Sexes | Nominated | |
| 2017 | North Texas Film Critics Association | Best Actress | Battle of the Sexes | Nominated | |
| 2018 | Detroit Film Critics Society | Best Supporting Actress | The Favourite | Nominated | |
| 2018 | Washington D.C. Area Film Critics Association | Best Supporting Actress | The Favourite | Nominated | |
| 2018 | San Francisco Bay Area Film Critics Circle | Best Supporting Actress | The Favourite | Nominated | |
| 2018 | Toronto Film Critics Association | Best Supporting Actress | The Favourite | Runner-up | |
| 2018 | Dallas–Fort Worth Film Critics Association | Best Supporting Actress | The Favourite | 2nd place | |
| 2018 | Seattle Film Critics Society | Best Actress in a Supporting Role | The Favourite | Nominated | |
| 2018 | St. Louis Film Critics Association | Best Supporting Actress | The Favourite | Runner-up | |
| 2018 | Vancouver Film Critics Circle | Best Supporting Actress | The Favourite | Nominated | |
| 2018 | Florida Film Critics Circle | Best Supporting Actress | The Favourite | Nominated | |
| 2018 | Florida Film Critics Circle | Best Cast | The Favourite | Won | |
| 2019 | Online Film Critics Society | Best Supporting Actress | The Favourite | Nominated | |
| 2019 | Houston Film Critics Society | Best Supporting Actress | The Favourite | Nominated | |
| 2019 | National Society of Film Critics | Best Supporting Actress | The Favourite | 3rd place | |
| 2019 | Austin Film Critics Association | Best Supporting Actress | The Favourite | Nominated | |
| 2019 | Austin Film Critics Association | Best Ensemble | The Favourite | Nominated | |
| 2019 | Alliance of Women Film Journalists | Best Supporting Actress | The Favourite | Nominated | |
| 2019 | Georgia Film Critics Association | Best Supporting Actress | The Favourite | Won | |
| 2019 | Georgia Film Critics Association | Best Ensemble | The Favourite | Won | |
| 2023 | Boston Society of Film Critics | Best Actress | Poor Things | Runner-up | |
| 2023 | Los Angeles Film Critics Association | Best Lead Performance | Poor Things | Won | |
| 2023 | Chicago Film Critics Association | Best Actress | Poor Things | Won | |
| 2023 | St. Louis Gateway Film Critics Association | Best Actress | Poor Things | Nominated | |
| 2023 | Washington D.C. Area Film Critics Association | Best Actress | Poor Things | Nominated | |
| 2023 | Dallas–Fort Worth Film Critics Association | Best Actress | Poor Things | Runner-up | |
| 2023 | San Diego Film Critics Society | Best Actress | Poor Things | Nominated | |
| 2023 | Florida Film Critics Circle | Best Actress | Poor Things | Runner-up | |
| 2024 | Georgia Film Critics Association | Best Actress | Poor Things | 2nd place | |
| 2024 | National Society of Film Critics | Best Actress | Poor Things | Runner-up | |
| 2024 | Seattle Film Critics Society | Best Actress in a Leading Role | Poor Things | Nominated | |
| 2024 | San Francisco Bay Area Film Critics Circle | Best Actress | Poor Things | Won | |
| 2024 | Houston Film Critics Society | Best Actress | Poor Things | Won | |
| 2024 | Astra Film and Creative Arts Awards | Best Actress | Poor Things | Nominated | |
| 2024 | Online Film Critics Society | Best Actress | Poor Things | Nominated | |
| 2024 | London Film Critics' Circle | Actress of the Year | Poor Things | Won | |
| 2024 | Vancouver Film Critics Circle | Best Actress | Poor Things | Nominated | |
| 2024 | Toronto Film Critics Association | Outstanding Lead Performance | Poor Things | 2nd place | |

== See also ==
- List of Emma Stone performances
