= Ashley Padilla =

American comedian (born 1993)

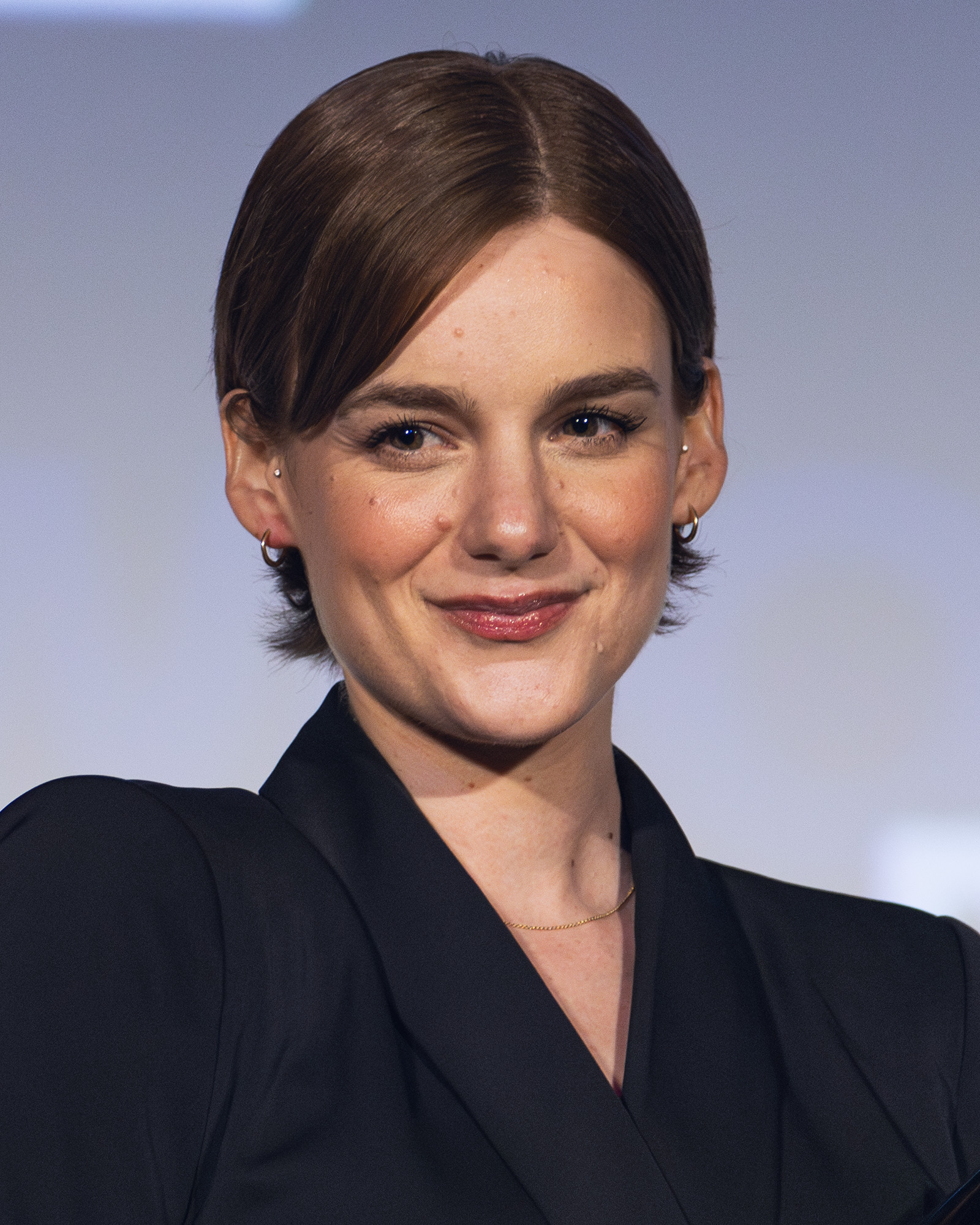
- Padilla in 2026
- Born: May 27, 1993 (age 33)
- Occupations: Comedian; actress

Ashley Padilla (born May 27, 1993) is an American comedian and actress. She is a cast member on Saturday Night Live (SNL) since joining the show for its 50th season in 2024.

== Early life ==
Padilla was born on May 27, 1993 and is the second-oldest of four siblings. She spent her earlier childhood in Oakland, California, where she attended Montclair Elementary School and resided until age ten. She then moved to Livermore, California with her family to be closer to her grandparents. Her father was not in her life, and she was raised by a single mother. Her mother worked for the software company Adobe. Her grandmother was a teacher's aide and her grandfather worked for the Lawrence Livermore National Laboratory.

As a child, Padilla regarded herself as funny and enjoyed making her siblings laugh, but she also perceived herself as annoying others around her, saying: "I was just the annoying one. I was always doing funny shit, but I think it pissed people off. I just remember adults always looking at me [in an exasperated manner]." As she got older, she bonded with an uncle over their mutual interest in comedy, and he would help her make amateur comedy videos, for which she devised some early characters. One interviewer described her as "not a theater kid". She participated in one school play as a child, an adaptation of The Emperor's New Clothes. She found that she liked the experience of performing in the play, but did not want to show how much she enjoyed it.

She had few outlets for self-expression, saying that being creative-minded was "the only thing [she] really did, other than [be] annoying". As a teenager, she got a job at a movie theater in Livermore to help out her mother, but described herself as "a very bad employee". She related a story where in high school a teacher saw her walk into class and exclaimed "I can't do this today!" Padilla said of the teacher, "He was right. I was a class clown, I was really loud, and I think it was that I just didn't like anything else. I was bored." She was an unexceptional student who failed multiple classes and had difficulty finding interests beyond school. "I was absolutely blind to my own self-worth, and I relied on exterior validation, which I was not getting. No one was like, 'You have an A in this.' I felt just horrible about myself." Around this time Padilla's mother purchased DVD sets of the American version of The Office for her. She credits Office star Steve Carell as a major comedic influence, saying "I can't even describe how much of an influence Steve Carell was on me. It meant so much to me to see people onscreen acting so dumb." Her Saturday Night Live forebears Will Ferrell and Kristen Wiig also influenced her. Of Ferrell, she said, "Will is like everything I'm pretending to be at all times. He has a way of getting so mad about something so little. That's my style of comedy. That's typically what I write."

Despite her burgeoning interest in comedy, Padilla did not view her influences as role models. "No part of me was like 'Those are actors.' I was just going, 'Holy shit, that's [Steve Carell's character] Michael Scott.' I remember hearing [filmmaker] Greta Gerwig say she used to watch movies and think they just appeared out of nowhere, and I couldn't relate to it more.”

Padilla graduated from Livermore High School in 2011. She attended community college for one week before deciding it was not a good fit for her. Aged 17, she took a job at a Sephora location while living with her grandmother. For some years, she earned income by doing makeup and hair for events alongside her sister. After a difficult time with mental health following a romantic breakup, her mother suggested she pursue comedy. She moved to Los Angeles at age 20 in 2014, where she moved in with the friend of a cousin.

== Career ==
=== 2014–2024: Early comedy career and years as personal assistant ===
Padilla initially took improv classes at Upright Citizens Brigade (UCB) but did not feel she fit in. "UCB's the cool kids. They're brilliant minds over there, too smart for me." In her early twenties, she got a job as an assistant to actress Diane Keaton, who became a friend and mentor. In an interview in December 2025, nearly two months after Keaton died, Padilla said "She was just the coolest person in the world. I feel like I would watch her as if I was watching a movie or something—you're watching the master work. That's how it [felt] being around her. She [was] unbelievable, and knew exactly what she wanted. In hindsight I realize how important that was to be around in your twenties, a woman who knows what she wants and is unapologetic about it and has a clear vision. I love her. She taught me a lot of stuff. And the world lost someone very, very special." She worked on Keaton's book Fashion First. She was inexperienced, and of working on the book, she said “I could do it because she believed I could. Diane wanted me to succeed."

After leaving UCB, Padilla was a member of the Groundlings Main Stage Company. While there, her tenure briefly overlapped with that of Chloe Fineman, with whom she reunited at SNL. Of the Groundlings, she said 'You can act like an idiot and go pretty far there. It's all behavioral. It's all 'A person who is incapable of doing a thing tries to do it'".

=== 2024–present: SNL and national recognition ===
At the Groundlings, Padilla caught the interest of talent manager Naomi Odenkirk, wife of actor-comedian Bob Odenkirk, and became a client. She booked guest appearances on Curb Your Enthusiasm and the revival of Night Court but could not find anything long-term. She almost gave up comedy after ten years in Los Angeles until a live sketch show she created called Party of Three made it into the 2024 edition of the comedy festival "Netflix Is a Joke". This led to an audition for SNL, which Padilla was initially convinced she did not book because SNL creator and showrunner Lorne Michaels told her "we don't have room". After the meeting, an SNL producer telephoned her and told her she was hired.

When asked what the most challenging aspect of being a cast member was, Padilla said "I don't think I have one. I get to make money doing comedy. I'm surrounded by the funniest fucking people you can imagine. There's an office for us to go to, to write our comedy. We get to be funny on television and then do it again the week after. I'm not joking. What could I possibly complain about? My one issue is that there's not enough time in the world to do it forever. I have so many ideas all the time. They start to pile up. I wish we had a hundred shows." With men outnumbering women in the cast two-to-one during SNL season 51, Padilla does not mind being asked to play generic roles such as mothers: "You want me to be a mom in your sketch? I will beg you to let me."

In April 2026, The New York Times praised Padilla's comedic timing on SNL and her "virtuosic deployment of the pregnant pause".

In June 2026, Padilla was cast alongside Emma Stone and Chris Pine in the romantic-comedy film The Catch, directed by Dave McCary, which is expected to be released in May 2027.

== Personal life ==
Since joining SNL, Padilla has lived in an apartment in New York City's West Village. She describes herself as a "homebody".

Padilla is a fan of survivalist reality competition television programs, and has expressed particular fondness for such shows as Survivor and Extracted. She has discussed a desire to compete on Survivor.

== Filmography ==
=== Film ===
Key: † / Denotes films that have not yet been released
| Year | Title | Role | Notes |
|---|---|---|---|
| 2020 | Shithouse | DG | |
| 2024 | Arthur's Whisky | | Sound Department: Earwig operator |
| 2024 | Summer Camp | Amber | Assistant to Diane Keaton |
| 2027 | The Catch † | | |

=== Television ===
| Year | Title | Role | Notes |
|---|---|---|---|
| 2016–2017 | Son of Zorn | Radiana IRL, Headbutt Girl IRL | 2 episodes |
| 2024 | Night Court | Mitzi | Episode: "Broadway Danny Gurgs" |
| 2024 | Curb Your Enthusiasm | Dana | Episode: "Fish Stuck" |
| 2024 | Nate Bargatze's Nashville Christmas | The Virgin Mary | Television Special |
| 2024–present | Saturday Night Live | Various Characters | |
| 2025 | SNL50: The Anniversary Special | Guest at Wedding | |

=== Music videos ===
| Year | Title | Artist | Notes |
|---|---|---|---|
| 2024 | "Here I Go" | The Lonely Island (ft. Charli XCX) | Role: "Bystander Woman"; Premiered as a Digital Short on Saturday Night Live |
