= The Yogurt Shop Murders =

American documentary series

- Genre: Documentary
- Directed by: Margaret Brown
- Music by: Claudia Sarne
- Country of origin: United States
- Original language: English
- No. of episodes: 5

Production
- Executive producers: Margaret Brown; Emma Stone; Dave McCary; Ali Herting; Nicole Stott; Emily Osborne; Mickey Stanley; Beth Garrabrant; Avi Belkin; Limor Gott Ronen; Nancy Abraham; Lisa Heller; Sara Rodriguez
- Producer: Alice Henty
- Cinematography: Justin Zweifach
- Editors: Michael Bloch; Tyler H. Walk; Geoffrey Richman; Camilla Hayman; Drew Blatman
- Running time: 59-97 minutes
- Production companies: HBO Documentary Films; A24; Fruit Tree; Pig Village

Original release
- Network: HBO
- Release: August 3, 2025 – May 22, 2026

The Yogurt Shop Murders is a 2025 American documentary miniseries directed and produced by Margaret Brown. It follows the 1991 Austin yogurt shop murders, exploring the trauma left and the investigation.

It had its world premiere at South by Southwest on March 10, 2025. It premiered on August 3, 2025, on HBO.

== Premise ==
The series follows the 1991 Austin yogurt shop murders, exploring the trauma of family members left in the aftermath of the crime, and the investigation. It includes interviews with family members and friends of the victims, lead police investigators John Jones and Paul Johnson, homicide investigator Mike Huckabay, author Beverly Lowry, correspondent Erin Moriarty, journalist Mike Hall, former Austin filmmaker Claire Huie, memory expert Robert Shomer, lawyers Joe Sawyer, Carlos Garcia, and Amber Farrelly, judge Mike Lynch and detective Dan Jackson. The series finale includes interviews with genealogist CeCe Moore, falsely accused suspect Forrest Welborn, and the family and widow of Maurice Pierce.

== Episodes ==
No.	Title	Directed by	Original release date	U.S. viewers (millions)
1	"Fire and Water"	Margaret Brown	August 3, 2025	0.203
2	"The Fifth Victim"	Margaret Brown	August 10, 2025	0.214
3	"Mental Evidence"	Margaret Brown	August 17, 2025	0.142
4	"In Your Own Time"	Margaret Brown	August 24, 2025	0.089
5	"The End of Wondering"	Margaret Brown	May 22, 2026	N/A

== Production ==
Emma Stone and Dave McCary had the idea to make a documentary series revolving around 1991 Austin yogurt shop killings, with A24 set to produce. Margaret Brown was asked to direct the series, agreeing after living in Austin and having friends who reported on the case. She then viewed the archival footage that had been obtained previously by Claire Huie, an aspiring filmmaker who paused working on her own project about the case, and wanted to make a stylistic David Lynch-esque inspired documentary. However, she pivoted after meeting the families and viewing the crime scene photos. Brown was more interested in memory and grief, rather than attempting to solve the case. A24 paid for therapy for the production team, due to the graphic nature of the case.

In January 2023, Margaret Brown revealed she was in production on an untitled project for HBO, produced by A24. In October 2024, it was announced the project was The Yogurt Shop Murders, with Emma Stone and Dave McCary serving as executive producers under their Fruit Tree banner.

Following the conclusion of the finale, Brown was beginning to work on her next project when she had coffee with lead investigator Dan Jackson, who had a different demeanor due to the case being solved, informing Brown he had a lead but it could take a while to confirm. Four days later, production on a new finale began, as the announcement of Robert Eugene Brashers being identified as the perpetrator of the murders on September 26, 2025.

== Reception ==
The series holds an 100% approval rating on review aggregator Rotten Tomatoes, based on 13 critic reviews. Metacritic, which uses a weighted average, gave a score of 83 out of 100 based on 4 critics, indicating "universal acclaim".

== Accolades ==
Award	Year	Category	Nominee(s)	Result	Ref.
Critics' Choice Documentary Awards	November 9, 2025	Best True Crime Documentary	The Yogurt Shop Murders	Nominated	
Critics' Choice Documentary Awards	November 9, 2025	Best Limited Documentary Series	The Yogurt Shop Murders	Nominated	
Primetime Emmy Awards	September 5–6, 2026	Outstanding Documentary or Nonfiction Series	Alice Henty, Michael Bloch, Margaret Brown, Nicole Stott, Emily Osborne, Emma Stone, Dave McCary, Mickey Stanley, Beth Garrabrant, and Avi Belkin	Nominated	
Primetime Emmy Awards	September 5–6, 2026	Outstanding Cinematography for a Nonfiction Program	Justin Zweifach and Christopher LaMarca (for "The End of Wondering")	Nominated	

It was nominated for Best True Crime Documentary and Best Limited Documentary Series at the 10th Critics' Choice Documentary Awards.
