= The Catch (2027 film) =

- Directed by: Dave McCary
- Written by: Patrick Kang; Michael Levin
- Produced by: Shawn Levy; Dan Levine; Michael H. Weber; Emma Stone; Dave McCary; Ali Herting
- Starring: Emma Stone; Chris Pine; Ashley Padilla; Druski; Tim Robbins; Sissy Spacek
- Cinematography: Sayombhu Mukdeeprom
- Production companies: Universal Pictures; 21 Laps Entertainment; Fruit Tree
- Distributed by: Universal Pictures
- Release date: May 21, 2027
- Country: United States
- Language: English

The Catch is an upcoming American romantic comedy film directed by Dave McCary and written by Patrick Kang and Michael Levin. It stars Emma Stone, Chris Pine, Ashley Padilla, Druski, Tim Robbins, and Sissy Spacek.

The Catch is scheduled to be released in the United States on May 21, 2027.

== Cast ==
- Emma Stone
- Chris Pine
- Ashley Padilla
- Druski
- Tim Robbins
- Sissy Spacek
- Chris Fleming
- Irina Shayk
- Josh Bogard

== Production ==
In April 2024, it was announced that Emma Stone was in talks to star and produce through her Fruit Tree banner in then untitled film with her husband Dave McCary also in talks to direct and produce with Universal Pictures distributing the film. In February 2026, it was confirmed that McCary would be directing a romantic comedy film, written by Patrick Kang and Michael Levin, and Stone officially set to star, with Chris Pine in talks to join. In April 2026, Pine was officially cast in the film. In June 2026, Ashley Padilla, Druski, Tim Robbins, and Sissy Spacek joined the cast. In July 2026, Chris Fleming and Irina Shayk joined the cast.

=== Filming ===
Principal photography began in July 2026, in New York City.

== Release ==
The Catch is scheduled to be released in the United States on May 21, 2027.
