= Margaret Brown (film director) =

American film director

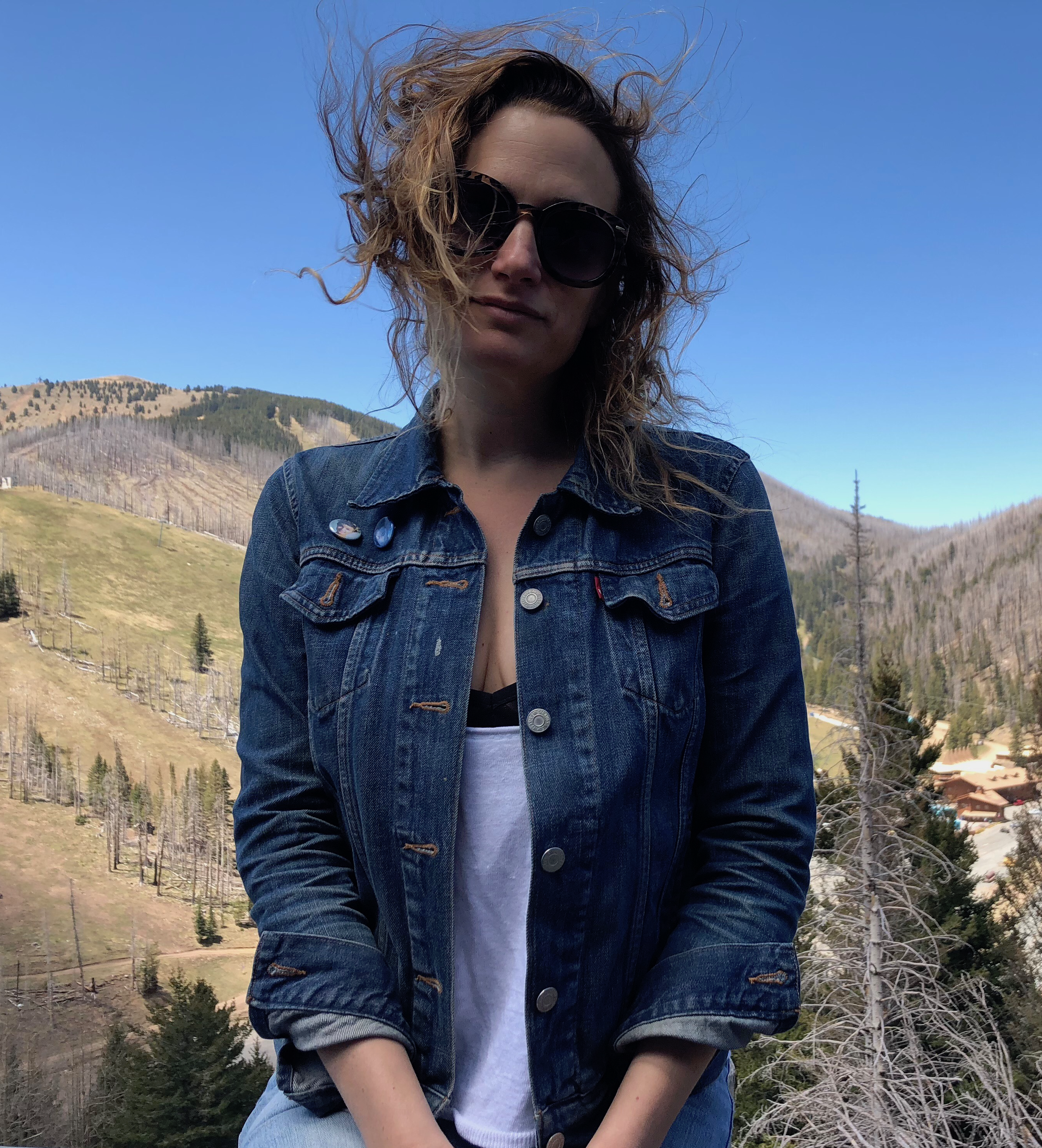
- Born: Margaret Luce Brown; Mobile, Alabama, U.S.
- Education: Brown University (BA); New York University (MFA)
- Occupation: film director
- Awards: Guggenheim Fellow (2026)

Margaret Brown is an American film director who has directed four feature-length documentaries. Her film Descendant, about the descendants of survivors of the last ship to carry enslaved Africans into the United States, was shortlisted for the 2023 Academy Awards.

== Early life and education ==
Brown was born and raised in Mobile, Alabama. A Murphy High School alumna, she earned her BA from Brown University with concentrations in Creative Writing and Modern Culture and Media, and her MFA in Film from New York University.

== Career ==
Brown served as cinematographer for 99 Threadwaxing in 1999 and director for Ice Fishing in 2000. Her full-length debut was Be Here To Love Me: A Film About Townes Van Zandt (2004) which chronicles the turbulent life of American singer-songwriter Townes Van Zandt. Time Out magazine listed it at number 7 on its "50 Greatest Music Films Ever".

She subsequently directed the feature documentary The Order of Myths a 2008 Sundance Film Festival selection about the segregated Mardi Gras celebration of Mobile, Alabama. The film was nominated for an Independent Spirit Award. It won many awards including a Peabody Award, a Cinematic Vision Award at the Silverdocs Documentary Festival and Truer Than Fiction Award at the Independent Spirit Awards.

In 2014, Brown directed the feature documentary The Great Invisible which won the SXSW Grand Jury Prize for Documentary and received an Emmy nomination for Exceptional Merit in Documentary Filmmaking and aired on Independent Lens on PBS in April 2015. The Great Invisible features the BP oil spill in the Gulf in 2010 and Deepwater Horizon oil spill aftermath.

Brown's documentary film, Descendant, explores issues of equity and justice facing descendants of the last US slave ship Clotilda, as well as the discovery of the sunken ship in 2019. It premiered at the Sundance Film Festival on January 22, 2022. The film began its distribution in 2022 by Netflix and Higher Ground, the film production company of former president Barack Obama and Michelle Obama. The film was shortlisted for the 2023 Academy Awards.

Brown directed and executive produced The Yogurt Shop Murders for HBO, produced by A24 and Fruit Tree focusing on the 1991 Austin yogurt shop killings.

== Filmography ==
Year	Title	Notes
2004	Be Here to Love Me	
2008	The Order of Myths	
2014	The Great Invisible	Emmy nomination for Exceptional Merit in Documentary Filmmaking
2022	Descendant	Special Jury Award for Impact for Creative Vision, 2022 Sundance Film Festival
2025	The Yogurt Shop Murders	

== Honors and awards ==
Brown was nominated a Cultural Ambassador for Documentary Filmmaking from the United States to Colombia, Kazakhstan and Kyrgyzstan and holds fellowships from United States Artists and The MacDowell Colony.

In April 2026, Brown was awarded the 2026 Guggenheim Fellowship in Film-Video.
