= Beth Garrabrant =

American artistic photographer

- Education: University of Notre Dame, International Center of Photography
- Occupation: Photographer
- Known for: Photography, notably for Taylor Swift album artwork

Beth Garrabrant is an American photographer known for her editorial and commercial work, and her photography collaborations with Taylor Swift since 2020 on her albums Folklore, Evermore, Fearless (Taylor's Version), Red (Taylor's Version), Midnights, Speak Now (Taylor's Version), 1989 (Taylor's Version) and The Tortured Poets Department. She primarily uses medium-format film in her work.

== Early life and education ==
After growing up in Connecticut and the North Shore of Illinois, Garrabrant attended the University of Notre Dame, before studying at the International Center of Photography in New York City.

== Career ==
Garrabrant works across a range of photography genres, from editorial to commercial shoots. Her most recognized work is her collaboration with Taylor Swift since 2020, when she worked on folklore.

From the very beginning, Taylor had a clear idea of what she wanted for the album's visuals. We looked at Surrealist work, imagery that toyed with human scale in nature. We also looked at early autochromes, ambrotypes, and photo storybooks from the 1940s.

— Beth Garrabrant, "Meet the photographer behind Taylor Swift's folklore artwork", i-D

She worked with Swift on subsequent album projects Red (Taylor's Version), Evermore, Midnights and The Tortured Poets Department.

In 2019, Garrabrant photographed author Joyce Carol Oates for ELLE Magazine. In 2020, Garrabrant shot a commissioned project portrait series for the Netflix show I Am Not Okay with This. Garrabrant has also shot portraits for Disney's Cruella and A24 films When You Finish Saving the World, Love Lies Bleeding, and Problemista.

From 2014, she served as photo director of NYLON magazine. Prior to her work at Nylon, Garrabrant worked as a photo editor at Travel + Leisure magazine, where she was introduced to the Pentax 6x7 II, which became one of her "go-to cameras" along with the Fuji GA645. She also shoots with the Contax T2 and Rolleiflex. Garrabrant shoots primarily on medium format film.

== Personal life ==
Garrabrant is married and lives in the vicinity of Austin, Texas.
