= Fruit Tree (company) =

American film production company

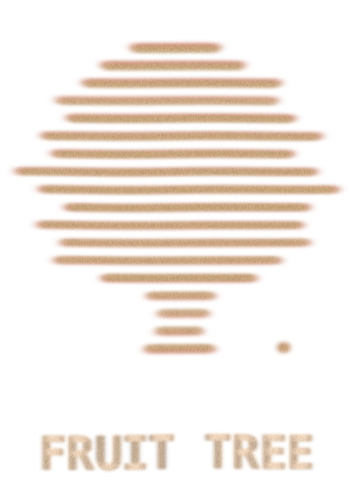
- Industry: Film
- Founded: 2020; 6 years ago
- Founder: Emma Stone; Dave McCary
- Headquarters: Los Angeles, California, U.S.
- Area served: United States
- Key people: Ali Herting
- Website: fruit-tree.com

Fruit Tree is an American film and television production company, founded by Emma Stone and Dave McCary in 2020. The company's productions include When You Finish Saving the World (2022), The Curse (2023), I Saw The TV Glow, and A Real Pain (2024). The films Poor Things (2023) and Bugonia (2025) both received nominations for the Academy Award for Best Picture, while the documentary series The Yogurt Shop Murders (2025–2026) was nominated for the Primetime Emmy Award for Outstanding Documentary or Nonfiction Series.

== History ==
In August 2020, it was announced that Emma Stone and Dave McCary had launched Fruit Tree, a production company producing film and television series, with a first-look television deal at A24. In October 2020, Ali Herting joined the company as a producer.

The company's debut feature When You Finish Saving the World, directed by Jesse Eisenberg, which premiered at the 2022 Sundance Film Festival in January 2022. The film was released in January 2023, by A24. Fruit Tree's first television project The Curse, starring Stone alongside co-creators Nathan Fielder and Benny Safdie, premiered on Showtime in November 2023.

Fruit Tree once again collaborated with A24 on Problemista, directed, written, and co-starring Julio Torres. The film was released in March 2024. I Saw the TV Glow, written and directed by Jane Schoenbrun, was released in theaters by A24 on May 3, 2024. Fantasmas, a second collaboration with Torres, premiered on HBO on June 7, 2024.

A Real Pain, a second collaboration with Eisenberg, was released on November 1, 2024 by Searchlight Pictures. Kieran Culkin, who co-starred alongside Eisenberg, received a Golden Globe, a British Academy of Film and Television Arts (BAFTA), and an Oscar for his supporting role.

Fruit Tree's first documentary project, The Yogurt Shop Murders directed by Margaret Brown focusing on the 1991 Austin yogurt shop killings, had its world premiere at South by Southwest in 2025.

The company's next feature film was Yorgos Lanthimos' Bugonia (2025), which premiered at the Venice International Film Festival on August 28, 2025. The film received four Oscar nominations, including Best Picture, Actress (for Stone), Adapted Screenplay, and Original Score.

=== Future projects ===
Fruit Tree have secured the rights to an unreleased novel by Ben Mezrich on the Carlsen–Niemann controversy, with Fielder attached to direct. In October 2024, the company entered into a first-look production deal with Universal Pictures.

== Filmography ==
=== Film ===
Year	Title	Director	Distributor
2022	When You Finish Saving the World	Jesse Eisenberg	A24
2023	Problemista	Julio Torres	A24
2023	Poor Things	Yorgos Lanthimos	Searchlight Pictures
2024	I Saw the TV Glow	Jane Schoenbrun	A24
2024	A Real Pain	Jesse Eisenberg	Searchlight Pictures
2025	Bugonia	Yorgos Lanthimos	Focus Features

==== Upcoming ====
Year	Title	Director	Distributor
2026	The Debut	Jesse Eisenberg	A24
2027	The Catch	Dave McCary	Universal Pictures
TBA	Checkmate	Nathan Fielder	A24
TBA	Dennis	Emily Mortimer	A24
TBA	Susannah’s Still Alive	Annie Hamilton	TBA
TBA	Untitled film	Maya Erskine	A24

==== Development ====
Year	Title	Production Companies	Distributor
TBA	Untitled Miss Piggy film	Walt Disney Studios, The Muppets Studio, Excellent Cadaver	Walt Disney Studios Motion Pictures

=== Television ===
Year	Title	Production Companies	Network
2023–2024	The Curse	A24, Blow Out Productions, Elara Pictures, Showtime Studios	Showtime
2024	Fantasmas	Irony Point, 3 Arts Entertainment	HBO
2025–2026	The Yogurt Shop Murders	HBO Documentary Films, A24, Pig Village	HBO
TBA	Exit Party	Laika Studios	TBA
