= Paper Man (2009 film) =

2009 film by Kieran & Michele Mulroney

- Theatrical release poster
- Directed by: Kieran Mulroney; Michele Mulroney
- Written by: Kieran Mulroney; Michele Mulroney
- Produced by: Richard N. Gladstein; Guymon Casady
- Starring: Jeff Daniels; Ryan Reynolds; Emma Stone; Kieran Culkin; Hunter Parrish; Lisa Kudrow
- Cinematography: Eigil Bryld
- Edited by: Sam Seig
- Music by: Mark McAdam
- Production company: FilmColony
- Distributed by: MPI Media Group
- Release dates: June 15, 2009 (LA Film Festival); April 23, 2010 (United States)
- Running time: 110 minutes
- Country: United States
- Language: English
- Box office: $13,514

Paper Man (also known as Unlikely Hero) is a 2009 American independent comedy drama film written and directed by Kieran and Michele Mulroney. The film stars Jeff Daniels as a struggling writer who relies on a childhood imaginary friend to help him with life decisions, Emma Stone as a 17-year-old high school student who befriends him, and Ryan Reynolds as the imaginary Captain Excellent. The film was developed at the Sundance Filmmakers’ Labs.

== Plot ==
Richard is a failed novelist who still talks to his imaginary superhero friend, Captain Excellent. At the urging of his wife, Claire, Richard has moved to a Long Island beach community for the winter season in order to overcome his writer's block.

There, Richard meets 17-year-old Abby, whom he sees while riding his rustic bike around town. He sees her light a fire in the trash can for no apparent reason. Richard hires her as a weekly babysitter even though he has no children. When she shows up to her babysitting job and he reveals to her that he has no kids, Abby seems completely fine with it and Richard decides to spend his time at the pier talking to Captain Excellent, who insists that Richard can never make a correct decision without his help. Returning home, Richard is awed to discover that Abby has made soup. He envies her ability to create something with her own hands, as he struggles to make anything at all. He hires her again for the same time next week, despite Captain Excellent's warning that it will only lead to bad things. Richard and Abby form a tenuous father-daughter-like relationship. Abby tells Richard about the death of her twin sister, Amy, while Richard confides in her about his failing marriage.

Meanwhile, Christopher, Abby's imaginary friend since Amy's death, watches her relationship with Richard grow, and though he feels neglected by Abby, all he wants is for her to be happy, no matter what that means for him.

Richard hosts a drunken party for local high school students and is punched by Abby's boyfriend. The party ends, the house a mess, and Abby and Richard fall asleep together on a couch, where Claire finds them the next morning. Claire and Richard have a fight. He blames her for their childless marriage and the impending end of his family name, but she counters that it had been his decision not to have kids.

Abby and Richard lose their imaginary friends, and Richard sends Abby a note before returning to try to rebuild his relationship with Claire.

== Cast ==
- Jeff Daniels as Richard Dunn
- Lisa Kudrow as Claire Dunn
- Ryan Reynolds as Captain Excellent
- Emma Stone as Abby
- Kieran Culkin as Christopher
- Hunter Parrish as Bryce
- Arabella Field as Lucy
- Chris Parnell as Peter

== Production ==
Production was originally scheduled to begin in April 2005 with Paul Giamatti cast in the lead role. Filming ultimately commenced on November 12, 2008, in New York and Montauk.

== Release ==
Paper Man was first shown at the 2009 Los Angeles Film Festival. MPI Media Group acquired the rights to show the film in North America and it was given a limited release on April 23, 2010.

The film was released with the new title Unlikely Hero in the United Kingdom on DVD by Signature Entertainment in April 2014. E1 Entertainment released the film on DVD in Canada in 2011.

== Critical reception ==
Paper Man received negative reviews from critics. Review aggregator website Rotten Tomatoes gives it a score of 34% based on 29 reviews with an average score of 4.90/10. Metacritic gives the film a score of 37% based on reviews from 15 critics.

Mick LaSalle of the San Francisco Chronicle called the film "listless, tepid, lifeless and fake". Kirk Honeycutt of The Hollywood Reporter commented, "Off-kilter and awkward from the get-go, this comedy never finds any rhythm or reason".

== See also ==
- Montauk, New York
