= Kieran Mulroney =

American actor (born 1965)

- Born: September 24, 1965 (age 60); Alexandria, Virginia, United States
- Occupations: Actor; musician; screenwriter
- Years active: 1988–present
- Spouse: Michele Mulroney

Kieran Mulroney (born September 24, 1965) is an American actor known for his numerous television appearances. He is also a musician and screenwriter.

== Early life ==
He was born on September 24, 1965, in Alexandria, Virginia, where he graduated from T. C. Williams High School. Kieran has four siblings. He has three older brothers, Conor, Sean, and fellow actor Dermot; and a younger sister, Moira.

== Personal life ==
His brother is actor Dermot Mulroney. He is married to screenwriter and director Michele Mulroney.

== Filmography ==
=== Television ===
- NCIS as Lieutenant Reynolds
- Judging Amy as Mr. Sinkler
- The Guardian as Robert Twain
- NYPD Blue as Andrew Sloin
- ER as Marty's Father
- Dead Man's Walk as Jimmy Tweed
- Seinfeld episode "The Implant" as Timmy, the character who rebukes George Costanza for double dipping a tortilla chip at a funeral reception
- Star Trek: The Next Generation episode "The Outrageous Okona"
- Star Trek: Enterprise episode "Fortunate Son"
- From the Earth to the Moon as astronaut Rusty Schweickart

=== Film ===
- Gettysburg as Lieutenant Colonel Moxley Sorrel
- Career Opportunities as Gil Kinney
- The Spitfire Grill as Joe Sperling
- The Immortals

=== Writer ===
- Paper Man
- Sherlock Holmes: A Game of Shadows
- Power Rangers (story by)

=== Director ===
- Paper Man – Credited as director alongside Michele Mulroney

=== Producer ===
- Wild Tigers I Have Known – Executive producer
