= Dave McCary =

American comedian, writer, and director (born 1985)

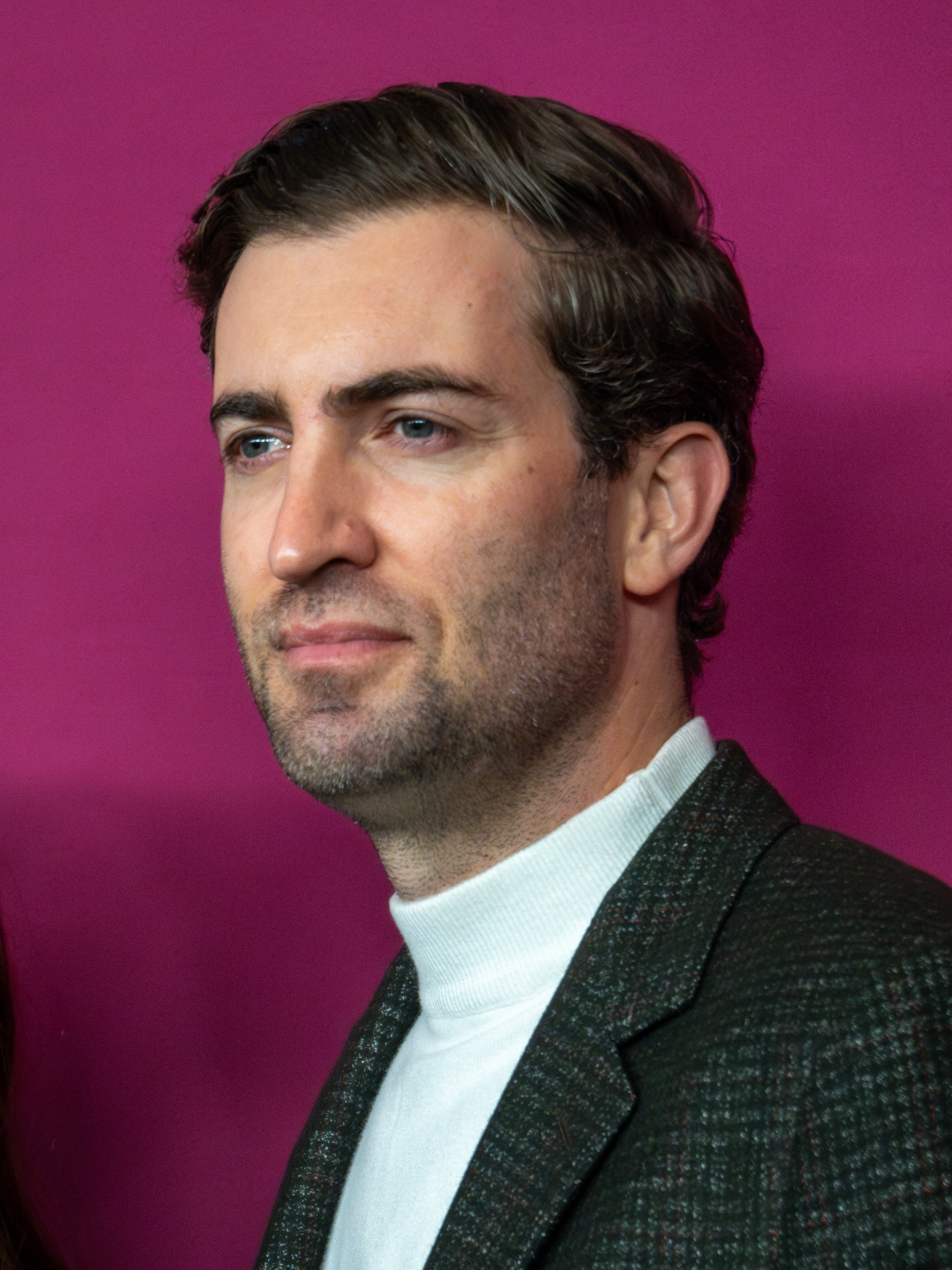
- McCary in 2024
- Born: David Lawrence McCary; July 2, 1985 (age 41); San Diego, California, U.S.
- Occupations: Comedian; writer; producer; director
- Years active: 2007–present
- Spouse: Emma Stone (m. 2020)
- Children: 1

David Lawrence McCary (born July 2, 1985) is an American comedian, writer, producer and director. From 2013 to 2018, he was a segment director and writer for Saturday Night Live. He is married to actress Emma Stone, with whom he co-founded the production company Fruit Tree.

== Early life and education ==
McCary was born in San Diego, California. He graduated from Monroe High School in Monroe, Wisconsin in 2003. He later attended the Brooks Institute of Photography before dropping out after two years. McCary was childhood friends with Kyle Mooney, and the two lived together while Mooney attended the University of Southern California.

== Career ==
In 2007, McCary formed the sketch comedy group Good Neighbor with Mooney, Beck Bennett, and Nick Rutherford. From 2010 to 2013, he directed installments of Epic Rap Battles of History. In 2013, Good Neighbor filmed a pilot for Comedy Central, The Good Neighbor Show, produced by Will Ferrell and Adam McKay under Gary Sanchez Productions. The same year, McCary joined Saturday Night Live for season 39 as a segment director, with Mooney and Bennett joining the show's cast. McCary left the show at the end of season 43 in 2018. In 2024, McCary returned to SNL to direct the pre-taped sketch "Papyrus 2".

In 2017, McCary directed the comedy-drama film Brigsby Bear produced by The Lonely Island. The film stars Mooney, Mark Hamill, Greg Kinnear, Matt Walsh, Michaela Watkins, Jorge Lendeborg Jr. and Ryan Simpkins. It premiered at the Sundance Film Festival in January 2017, and was released in July 2017 by Sony Pictures Classics.

In August 2020, McCary and Emma Stone co-founded the production company, Fruit Tree, with a two-year first-look television deal at A24.

== Personal life ==
McCary began dating actress Emma Stone in October 2017. They announced their engagement in December 2019, and married the following year. They had a daughter in March 2021.

== Filmography ==
=== Film ===
Year	Title	Director	Producer	Notes	Refs.
2017	Brigsby Bear	Yes	No		
2022	When You Finish Saving the World	No	Yes		
2023	Problemista	No	Yes		
2024	I Saw the TV Glow	No	Yes		
2024	A Real Pain	No	Yes		
2027	The Catch	Yes	Yes	Post-production	

=== Television ===
Year	Title	Director	Producer	Writer	Notes	Refs.
2013–2018	Saturday Night Live	Yes	No	Yes	Segment director	
2019	My Favorite Shapes by Julio Torres	Yes	No	No		
2022	Saturday Morning All Star Hits!	Yes	Yes	Yes	Directed live-action segments	
2023–2024	The Curse	No	Yes	No		
2024	Fantasmas	No	Yes	No		
2025	The Yogurt Shop Murders	No	Yes	No		

=== Web series ===
Year	Title	Director	Producer	Writer	Notes	Refs.
2010–2013	Epic Rap Battles of History	Yes	No	No		
