= List of Kieran Culkin performances =

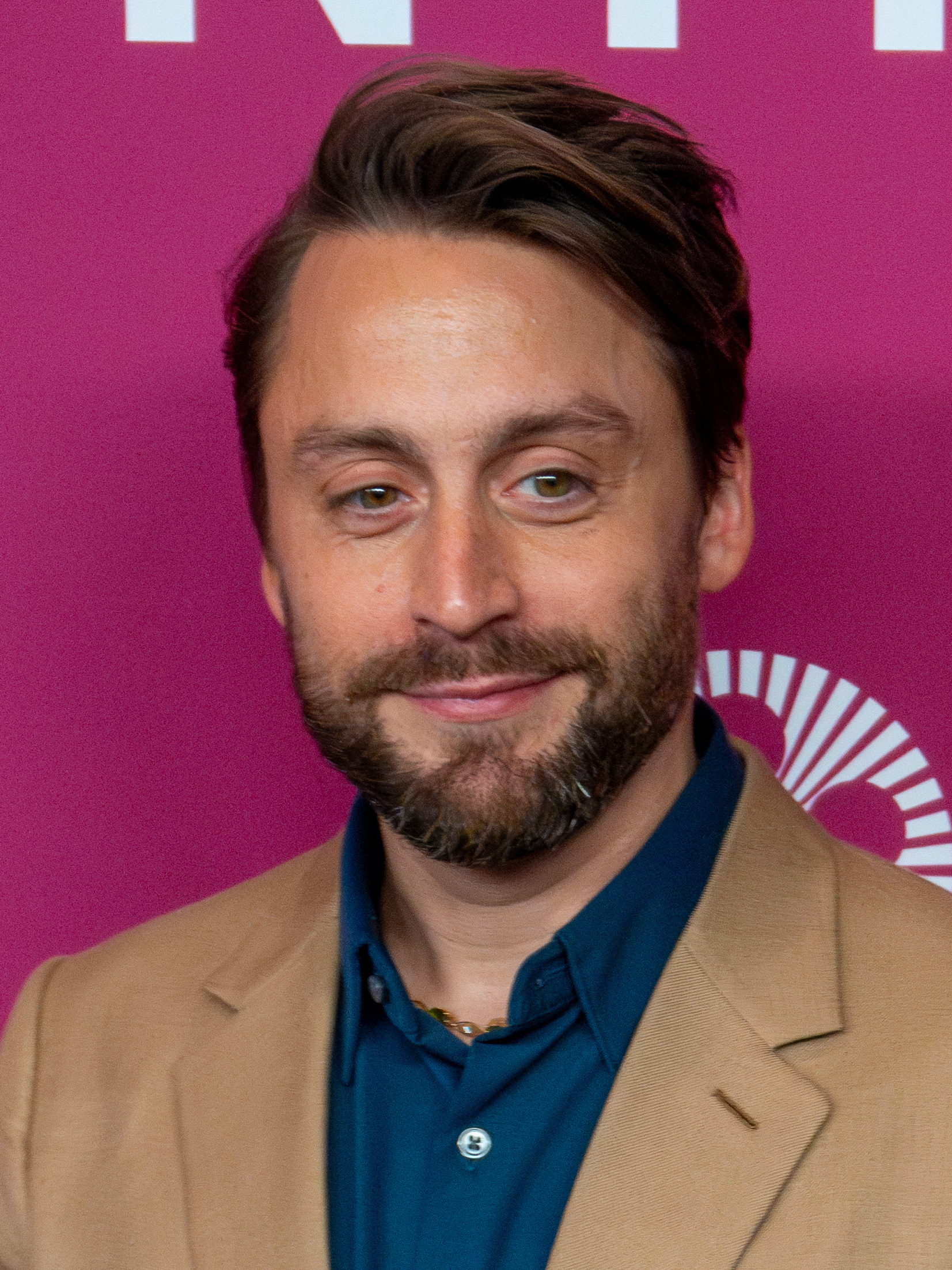
Culkin at the 2024 New York Film Festival

Kieran Culkin is an American actor who has appeared in films, television series, and stage productions since he was a child. He made his feature film debut alongside his older brother, Macaulay, as a bedwetting Pepsi aficionado in Home Alone (1990), the second-highest-grossing Christmas film of all time. While reprising his role in its 1992 sequel, Culkin portrayed the young son of Steve Martin and Diane Keaton's characters in the Father of the Bride franchise (1991–2020). His first leading role came with the coming-of age drama The Mighty (1998), where he played a boy suffering from Morquio syndrome.

After appearing in She's All That and The Cider House Rules (both 1999), which were both commercial successes, Culkin achieved his breakthrough as a sardonic teenager in the comedy-drama Igby Goes Down (2002). The role won him the Critics' Choice Movie Award for Best Young Actor/Actress and earned a nomination for the Golden Globe Award for Best Actor in a Motion Picture – Musical or Comedy. Culkin took a hiatus from the screen due to personal conflicts and worked extensively in theater, making his West End debut as a replacement for Jake Gyllenhaal in Kenneth Lonergan's This Is Our Youth. He continued to perform in off-Broadway plays such as Gina Gionfriddo's After Ashley (2004), for which he won an Obie Award for Distinguished Performance, and Eric Bogosian's revival of SubUrbia (2006).

Culkin made an intermittent return to the screen through the comedy-drama film Lymelife (2008). His role as the sarcastic Wallace Wells in Edgar Wright's action comedy Scott Pilgrim vs. the World (2010) earned praise from critics. From 2012 to 2015, Culkin headlined the Broadway, Chicago, and Sydney productions of This is Our Youth as a manipulative college dropout living under the dawn of the Reagan era. On television, he won the Primetime Emmy Award for Outstanding Lead Actor in a Drama Series for his portrayal of Roman Roy in the HBO series Succession (2018–2023). Culkin's critical success continued with Jesse Eisenberg's buddy comedy film A Real Pain (2024). His performance as a free-spirited drifter struggling with grief earned the BAFTA and Academy Awards for Best Supporting Actor.

== Film ==
Key
†	Denotes films that have not yet been released

Year	Title	Role	Notes	Ref(s)
1990	Home Alone	Fuller McCallister		
1991	Only the Lonely	Patrick Muldoon Jr.		
1991	Father of the Bride	Matthew "Matty" Banks		
1992	Home Alone 2: Lost in New York	Fuller McCallister		
1993	Nowhere to Run	Mike "Mookie" Anderson		
1994	My Summer Story	Ralph "Ralphie" Parker		
1995	Father of the Bride Part II	Matthew "Matty" Banks		
1996	Amanda	Biddle Farnsworth		
1998	The Mighty	Kevin Dillon		
1999	She's All That	Simon Boggs		
1999	Music of the Heart	Alexi Tzavaras		
1999	The Cider House Rules	Buster		
2002	The Dangerous Lives of Altar Boys	Tim Sullivan		
2002	Igby Goes Down	Jason "Igby" Slocumb Jr.		
2008	Lymelife	Jimmy Bartlett		
2009	Paper Man	Christopher		
2010	Scott Pilgrim vs. the World	Wallace Wells		
2011	Margaret	Paul Hirsch		
2013	Movie 43	Neil	Segment: "Veronica"	
2015	Quitters	Mr. Becker		
2016	Wiener-Dog	Brandon McCarthy		
2017	Infinity Baby	Ben		
2017	Approaching a Breakthrough	Norman Kaminsky	Short film	
2020	Father of the Bride, Part 3(ish)	Matthew "Matty" Banks	Short film	
2021	No Sudden Move	Charley		
2024	A Real Pain	Benjamin "Benji" Kaplan		
2025	Animal Farm	Squealer	Voice	
2026	The Hunger Games: Sunrise on the Reaping	Caesar Flickerman		
2027	Paris Paramount †	TBA	Filming	
2028	Clay †	Flip	Voice, Pre-production	

== Television ==
Year	Title	Role	Notes	Ref.
1991–2025	Saturday Night Live	Himself / various	Host (1 episode); guest appearance (3 episodes)	
1996	Frasier	Jimmy (voice)	Episode: "The Impossible Dream"	
1999	The Magical Legend of the Leprechauns	Barney O'Grady	Miniseries	
2001	Go Fish	Andy "Fish" Troutner	Main cast (5 episodes)	
2015	Fargo	Rye Gerhardt	Guest cast (2 episodes; season 2)	
2015	Long Live the Royals	Peter (voice)	Main cast (4 episodes)	
2018–2023	Succession	Roman Roy	Main cast (39 episodes)	
2020	Robot Chicken	Joe Jonas / Nostradamus's Intern (voice)	Episode: "Petless M in: Cars Are Couches On The Road"	
2022	Gaming Wall Street	Himself (narrator)	Documentary miniseries	
2022	The Boys Presents: Diabolical	O.D. (voice)	Episode: "I'm Your Pusher"	
2022–2025	Solar Opposites	Glen Kumstein / Dodge Charger (voice)	Guest cast (9 episodes; season 3–6)	
2023	Agent Elvis	Gabriel Wolf (voice)	Episode: "Godspeed, Drunk Monkey"	
2023	Scott Pilgrim Takes Off	Wallace Wells (voice)	Main cast (8 episodes)	
2023	Teenage Euthanasia	Ref Mazos (voice)	Episode: "A Waist-Down Ghost Town Shut Down"	
2024	The Second Best Hospital in the Galaxy	Dr. Plowp / Screechie (voice)	Main cast (8 episodes)	
2025	Krapopolis	Wormius (voice)	Episode: "Number Twos"	
2025	#1 Happy Family USA	Dr. Riley (voice)	Main cast (4 episodes)	
2025	Gogglebox for Stand up to Cancer Goes Hollywood!	Himself	Television special; appeared with Jazz Charton	
2025	The Simpsons	Alexander "Hub" Hubley (voice)	Episode: "Guess Who's Coming to Skinner"	
2025	Tales of the Teenage Mutant Ninja Turtles	Dr. Jordan Perry (voice)	Episode: "The Rejects"	
2026	Family Guy	Satan (voice)	Episode: “Happy Hell-o-ween”	

== Theater ==
Year	Title	Role	Venue	Theatre	Ref.
2000	The Moment When	Wilson	Playwrights Horizons	Off-Broadway	
2002–2003	This Is Our Youth	Warren Straub (replacement)	Garrick Theatre	West End	
2004	Autobahn	—N/a	Manhattan Class Company	Off-Broadway	
2005	After Ashley	Justin Hammond	Vineyard Theatre	Off-Broadway	
2006	subUrbia	Buff	Second Stage Theater	Off-Broadway	
2006	First Tree in Antarctica	Shawn	American Arlines Theatre	Broadway	
2009	The Starry Messenger	Student	Acorn Theatre	Off-Broadway	
2012	This Is Our Youth	Dennis Ziegler	Sydney Opera House	Sydney	
2014–2015	This Is Our Youth	Dennis Ziegler	Steppenwolf Theatre Company	Chicago	
2014–2015	This Is Our Youth	Dennis Ziegler	Cort Theatre	Broadway	
2025	Glengarry Glen Ross	Richard Roma	Palace Theatre	Broadway	

== Commercials ==
Year(s)	Company	Promoting	Title	Region	Ref.
2020	Volkswagen	Vehicle: Atlas Cross Sport	"The Accountant"	United States	
2025	NerdWallet	Application	"Genius Beluga"	United States (Super Bowl LIX)	

== Audiobooks ==
Year	Title	Role	Notes	Ref.
2016	For Magnus Chase: Hotel Valhalla Guide to the Norse Worlds	Narrator		
2016	The Hammer of Thor	Narrator		

== See also ==
- List of awards and nominations received by Kieran Culkin
