= List of awards and nominations received by Kieran Culkin =

Kieran Culkin awards and nominations
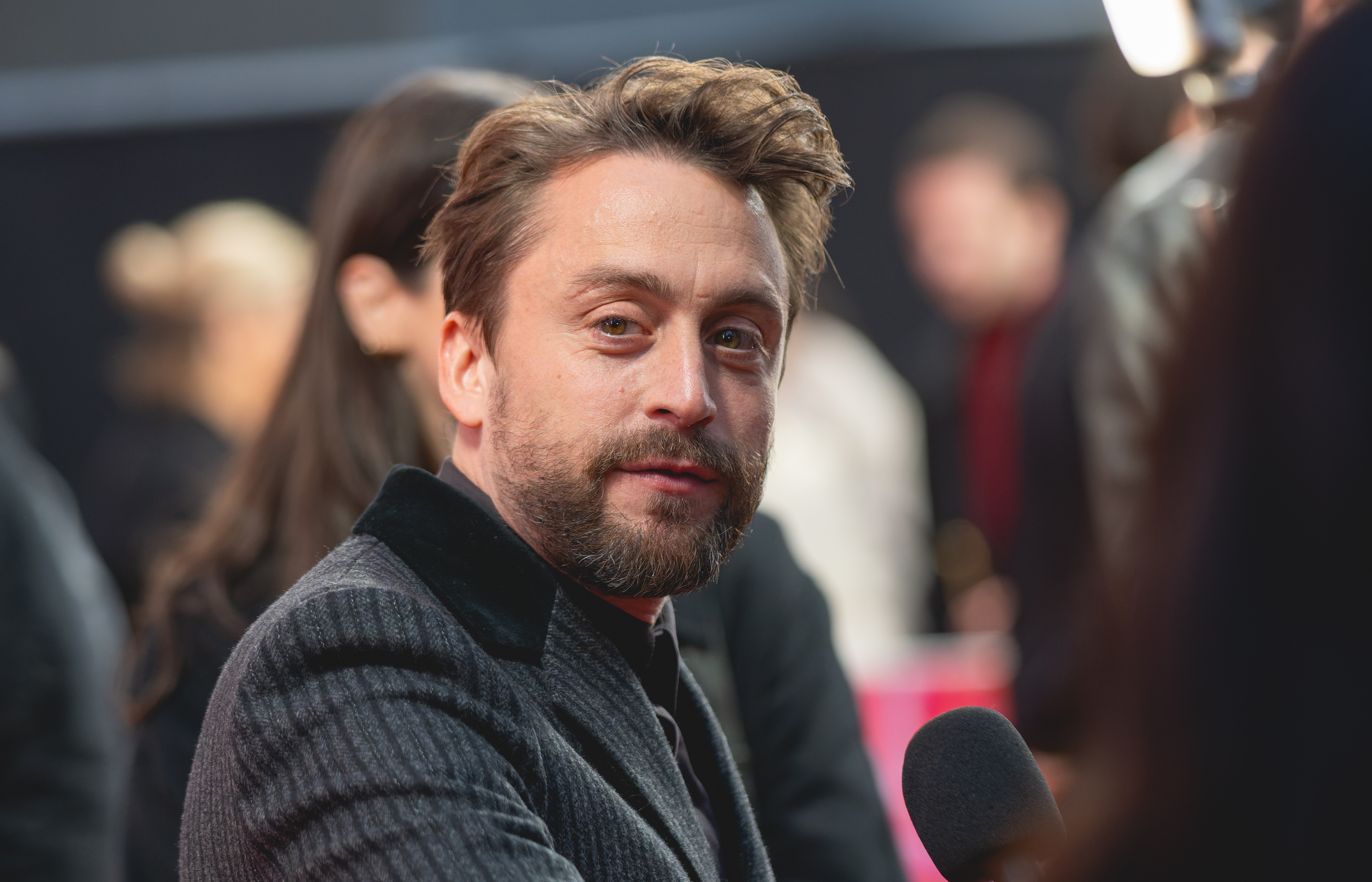
- Culkin at the 2024 BFI London Film Festival
Awards and nominations
Award	Wins	Nominations
Academy Awards	1	1
Actor Awards	3	6
BAFTA Awards	1	1
Critics' Choice Awards	4	4
Emmy Awards	1	3
Golden Globes	2	6

Totals (Note: Certain award groups do not simply award one winner. They acknowledge several different recipients, have runners-up, and have third place. Since this is a specific recognition and is different from losing an award, runner-up mentions are considered wins in this award tally. For simplification and to avoid errors, each award in this list has been presumed to have had a prior nomination.)
- Wins: 45
- Nominations: 79

Kieran Culkin is an American actor known for his roles on stage and screen. Throughout his career, he has received various accolades, including an Academy Award, a BAFTA Award, four Critics' Choice Awards, two Golden Globes, a Primetime Emmy Award, and three SAG-AFTRA's Actor Awards.

He first achieved a career breakthrough after starring as a rebellious teenager in the independent comedy-drama film Igby Goes Down (2002), for which he was nominated for the Golden Globe Award for Best Actor and won the Critics' Choice Movie Award for Best Young Performer. He gained recognition for his performance as Roman Roy in the HBO drama series Succession (2018–2023), winning the Primetime Emmy Award for Outstanding Lead Actor in a Drama Series, the corresponding Golden Globe Award, two Critics' Choice Television Awards for both Best Actor and Best Supporting Actor in a Drama Series, and two ensemble prizes at the Actor Awards.

Culkin's performance in Jesse Eisenberg's buddy comedy film A Real Pain (2024), where he plays free-spirited and mentally unstable drifter Benjamin "Benji" Kaplan, who travels to Poland to connect with his Polish-Jewish heritage, won him the Actor Award for Outstanding Male Actor in a Supporting Role, the BAFTA Award for Best Actor in a Supporting Role, the Golden Globe Award for Best Supporting Actor, and the Academy Award for Best Supporting Actor.

== Major associations ==
=== Academy Awards ===
Year	Category	Nominated work	Result	Ref.
2025	Best Supporting Actor	A Real Pain	Won	

=== Actor Awards ===
Year	Category	Nominated work	Result	Ref.
2000	Outstanding Cast in a Motion Picture	The Cider House Rules	Nominated	
2022	Outstanding Male Actor in a Drama Series	Succession (season three)	Nominated	
2022	Outstanding Ensemble in a Drama Series	Succession (season three)	Won	
2024	Outstanding Male Actor in a Drama Series	Succession (season four)	Nominated	
2024	Outstanding Ensemble in a Drama Series	Succession (season four)	Won	
2025	Outstanding Male Actor in a Supporting Role	A Real Pain	Won	

=== BAFTA Awards ===
Year	Category	Nominated work	Result	Ref.
British Academy Film Awards
2025	Best Actor in a Supporting Role	A Real Pain	Won	

=== Critics' Choice Awards ===
Year	Category	Nominated work	Result	Ref.
Film
2003	Best Young Performer	Igby Goes Down	Won	
2025	Best Supporting Actor	A Real Pain	Won	
Television
2022	Best Supporting Actor in a Drama Series	Succession	Won	
2024	Best Actor in a Drama Series	Succession	Won	

=== Emmy Awards ===
Year	Category	Nominated work	Result	Ref.
Primetime Emmy Awards
2020	Outstanding Supporting Actor in a Drama Series	Succession (episode: "Tern Haven")	Nominated	
2022	Outstanding Supporting Actor in a Drama Series	Succession (episode: "Too Much Birthday")	Nominated	
2023	Outstanding Lead Actor in a Drama Series	Succession (episode: "Church and State")	Won	

=== Golden Globe Awards ===
Year	Category	Nominated work	Result	Ref.
2003	Best Actor in a Motion Picture – Musical or Comedy	Igby Goes Down	Nominated	
2019	Best Supporting Actor – Series, Miniseries or Television Film	Succession (season one)	Nominated	
2020	Best Supporting Actor – Series, Miniseries or Television Film	Succession (season two)	Nominated	
2022	Best Supporting Actor – Series, Miniseries or Television Film	Succession (season three)	Nominated	
2024	Best Actor in a Television Series – Drama	Succession (season four)	Won	
2025	Best Supporting Actor – Motion Picture	A Real Pain	Won	

== Miscellaneous awards ==
Ceremony	Year	Category	Nominated work	Result	Ref.
AACTA International Awards	2024	Best Actor in a Series	Succession	Nominated	
AACTA International Awards	2025	Best Supporting Actor	A Real Pain	Nominated	
Astra Film Awards	2024	Best Supporting Actor	A Real Pain	Won	
Astra Television Awards	2022	Best Supporting Actor in a Broadcast Network or Cable Series – Drama	Succession	Nominated	
Astra Television Awards	2024	Best Actor in a Broadcast Network or Cable Series – Drama	Succession	Nominated	
Dorian Awards	2023	Best TV Performance – Drama	Succession	Nominated	
Dorian Awards	2025	Best Supporting Film Performance	A Real Pain	Nominated	
Drama League Awards	2005	Distinguished Performance	After Ashley	Nominated	
Drama League Awards	2025	Distinguished Performance	Glengarry Glen Ross	Nominated	
Film Independent Spirit Awards	2025	Best Supporting Performance	A Real Pain	Won	
Gotham Awards	2024	Outstanding Supporting Performance	A Real Pain	Nominated	
IFTA Film & Drama Awards	2025	Best International Actor	A Real Pain	Nominated	
MTV Movie & TV Awards	2003	Best Male Breakthrough Performance	Igby Goes Down	Nominated	
National Board of Review Awards	2024	Best Supporting Actor	A Real Pain	Won	
Obie Awards	2005	Distinguished Performance	After Ashley	Won	
Outer Critics Circle Awards	2025	Outstanding Featured Performer in a Broadway Play	Glengarry Glen Ross	Nominated	
People's Choice Awards	2024	The Male TV Star of the Year	Succession	Nominated	
People's Choice Awards	2024	The Drama TV Star of the Year	Succession	Nominated	
Polish Film Awards	2025	Best Supporting Actor	A Real Pain	Nominated	
Satellite Awards	2003	Best Actor in a Motion Picture – Musical or Comedy	Igby Goes Down	Won	
Satellite Awards	2019	Best Cast – Television Series	Succession	Won	
Satellite Awards	2022	Best Cast – Television Series	Succession	Won	
Satellite Awards	2024	Best Cast – Television Series	Succession	Won	
Satellite Awards	2025	Best Supporting Actor – Motion Picture	A Real Pain	Nominated	
Scream Awards	2011	Best Supporting Actor	Scott Pilgrim vs. the World	Nominated	
TCA Awards	2023	Individual Achievement in Drama	Succession	Nominated	
Young Artist Awards	1993	Best Young Actor Co-Starring in a Motion Picture	Father of the Bride	Nominated	
Young Artist Awards	1999	Best Leading Young Actor in a Feature Film	The Mighty	Nominated	

== Critics associations ==
Year	Association	Category	Nominated work	Result	Ref.
2002	Las Vegas Film Critics Society	Best Youth in Film	Igby Goes Down	Won	
2010	Detroit Film Critics Society	Best Ensemble	Scott Pilgrim vs. the World	Nominated	
2024	Chicago Film Critics Association	Best Supporting Actor	A Real Pain	Won	
2024	Dallas-Fort Worth Film Critics Association	Best Supporting Actor	A Real Pain	Runner-up	
2024	Florida Film Critics Circle	Best Actor	A Real Pain	Won	
2024	Los Angeles Film Critics Association	Best Supporting Performance	A Real Pain	Won (Note: Tied with Yura Borisov for Anora.)	
2024	New York Film Critics Circle	Best Supporting Actor	A Real Pain	Won	
2024	New York Film Critics Online	Best Supporting Actor	A Real Pain	Nominated	
2024	Phoenix Film Critics Society	Best Supporting Actor	A Real Pain	Won	
2024	San Diego Film Critics Society	Best Supporting Actor	A Real Pain	Won	
2024	San Francisco Bay Area Film Critics Circle	Best Supporting Actor	A Real Pain	Runner-up	
2024	Seattle Film Critics Society	Best Supporting Actor	A Real Pain	Nominated	
2024	Southeastern Film Critics Association	Best Supporting Actor	A Real Pain	Runner-up	
2024	St. Louis Film Critics Association	Best Supporting Actor	A Real Pain	Won	
2024	Toronto Film Critics Association	Outstanding Supporting Performance	A Real Pain	Won	
2024	Washington D.C. Area Film Critics Association	Best Supporting Actor	A Real Pain	Won	
2025	Alliance of Women Film Journalists	Best Supporting Actor	A Real Pain	Won	
2025	Austin Film Critics Association	Best Supporting Actor	A Real Pain	Nominated	
2025	Georgia Film Critics Association	Best Supporting Actor	A Real Pain	Won	
2025	Houston Film Critics Society	Best Supporting Actor	A Real Pain	Won	
2025	Kansas City Film Critics Circle	Best Supporting Actor	A Real Pain	Won	
2025	London Film Critics' Circle	Supporting Actor of the Year	A Real Pain	Won	
2025	National Society of Film Critics	Best Supporting Actor	A Real Pain	Won	
2025	Online Film Critics Society	Best Supporting Actor	A Real Pain	Won	
2025	Vancouver Film Critics Circle	Best Supporting Actor	A Real Pain	Won	

== Film festivals ==
Year	Festival	Category	Nominated work	Result	Ref.
2024	Newport Beach Film Festival	Outstanding Male Performance	A Real Pain	Won	
2024	SCAD Savannah Film Festival	Virtuoso Award	A Real Pain	Won	
2025	Capri Hollywood International Film Festival	Best Supporting Actor	A Real Pain	Won	
2025	Palm Springs International Film Festival	Breakthrough Performance	A Real Pain	Won	
2025	Santa Barbara International Film Festival	Virtuoso Award	A Real Pain	Won	

== Listicles ==
Name of publisher, name of listicle, year(s) listed, and placement result
Publisher	Listicle	Year(s)	Result	Ref.
Entertainment Weekly	Entertainers of the Year	2019	Placed (Note: Shared with the cast of Succession.)	
