= List of accolades received by A Real Pain =

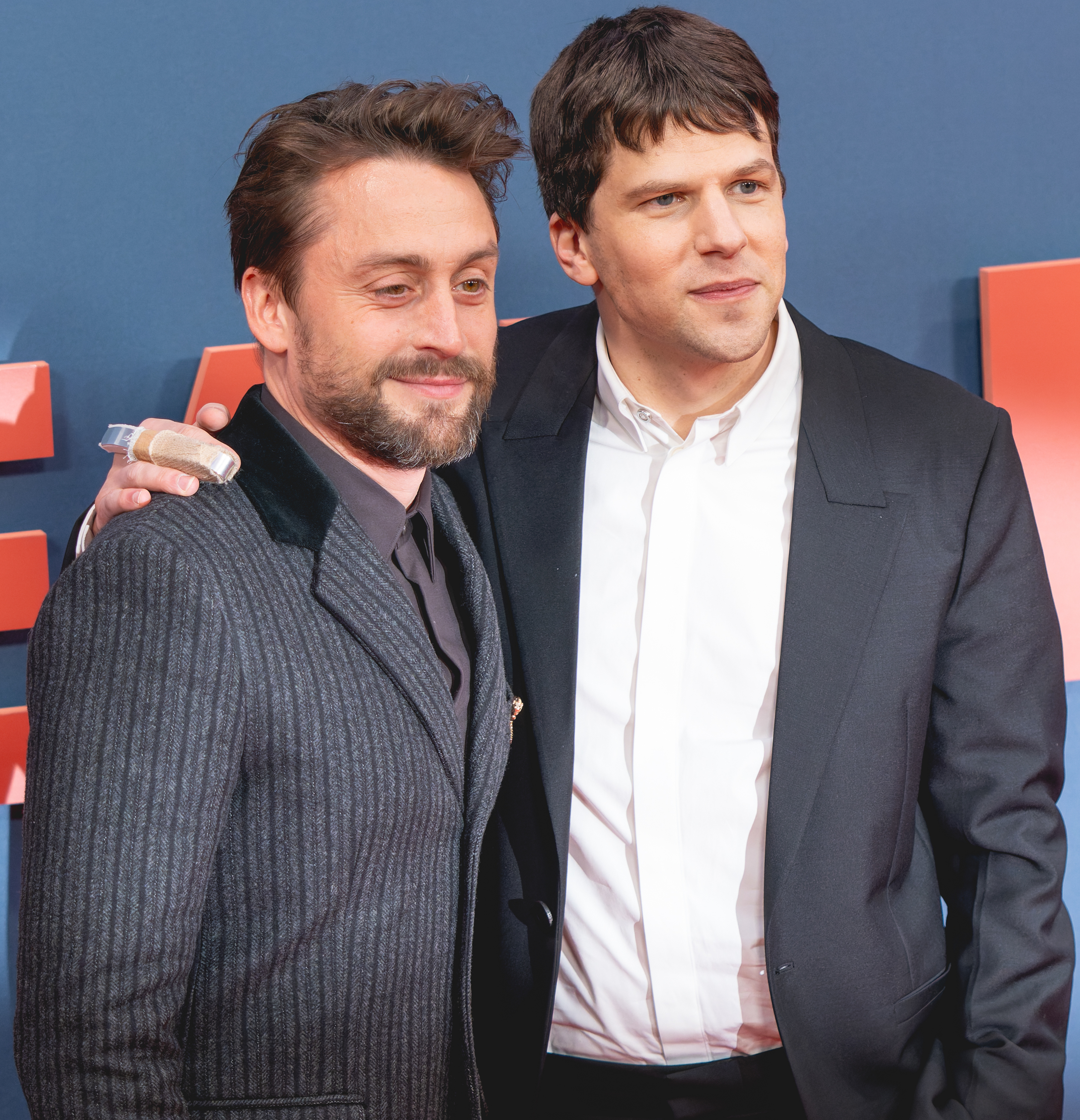
- Kieran Culkin (left) received several accolades for his performance, as did Jesse Eisenberg (right) for his screenplay
Accolades
Award	Wins	Nominations
AACTA International Awards	1	2
Academy Awards	1	2
American Cinema Editors Awards	0	1
American Film Institute Awards	1	1
British Academy Film Awards	2	2
Critics' Choice Movie Awards	2	3
Golden Globe Awards	1	4
Gotham Awards	0	1
Independent Spirit Awards	2	2
Irish Film & Television Academy Awards	0	1
Los Angeles Film Critics Association	2	2
National Board of Review	2	2
National Society of Film Critics	2	2
New York Film Critics Circle	1	1
Polish Film Awards	0	2
Producers Guild of America Awards	0	1
Satellite Awards	1	4
Screen Actors Guild Awards	1	1
Writers Guild of America Awards	0	1

Totals (Note: Certain award groups do not simply award one winner. They acknowledge several different recipients, have runners-up, and have third place. Since this is a specific recognition and is different from losing an award, runner-up mentions are considered wins in this award tally. For simplification and to avoid errors, each award in this list has been presumed to have had a prior nomination.)
- Wins: 79
- Nominations: 155

A Real Pain is a 2024 buddy road comedy-drama film written and directed by Jesse Eisenberg, who stars opposite Kieran Culkin. An international co-production between Poland and the United States, the film follows mismatched cousins who reunite for a heritage tour through Poland in honor of their late grandmother, but their old tensions resurface against the backdrop of their family history. The cast also includes Will Sharpe, Jennifer Grey, Kurt Egyiawan, Liza Sadovy, and Daniel Oreskes.

The film first premiered in competition at the 2024 Sundance Film Festival, where it won the Waldo Salt Screenwriting Award. A Real Pain competed in several film festivals before it was released theatrically in the United States on November 1, 2024, and in Poland on November 8 through Searchlight Pictures. The film received acclaim from critics, who praised Eisenberg's direction and screenplay, Culkin's performance, and its emotional weight. On the review aggregator website Rotten Tomatoes, the film holds an approval rating of 96% based on 276 reviews, making it the platform's best-reviewed drama movie of 2024.

A Real Pain was named one of the top ten films of 2024 by the National Board of Review and the American Film Institute. Culkin became the third actor in history to win Best Supporting Performance honors from the four most prestigious American film critics associations: the Los Angeles Film Critics Association, the National Board of Review, the National Society of Film Critics, and the New York Film Critics Circle. A Real Pain received four nominations at the 82nd Golden Globe Awards, where Culkin won Best Supporting Actor.

== Accolades ==
Award	Date of ceremony	Category	Nominee(s)	Result	Ref.
AACTA International Awards	February 7, 2025	Best Screenplay	Jesse Eisenberg	Won	
AACTA International Awards	February 7, 2025	Best Supporting Actor	Kieran Culkin	Nominated	
Academy Awards	March 2, 2025	Best Supporting Actor	Kieran Culkin	Won	
Academy Awards	March 2, 2025	Best Original Screenplay	Jesse Eisenberg	Nominated	
Alliance of Women Film Journalists EDA Awards	January 7, 2025	Best Actor in a Supporting Role	Kieran Culkin	Won	
Alliance of Women Film Journalists EDA Awards	January 7, 2025	Best Screenplay, Original	Jesse Eisenberg	Nominated	
American Cinema Editors Awards	March 14, 2025	Best Edited Feature Film (Comedy, Theatrical)	Robert Nassau	Nominated	
American Film Festival	November 6, 2024	Indie Star Award	Jesse Eisenberg	Honored	
American Film Institute Awards	December 5, 2024	Top 10 Films of the Year	A Real Pain	Won (Note: This award does not have a single winner, but recognizes multiple films.)	
Astra Film Awards	December 8, 2024	Best Picture	A Real Pain	Nominated	
Astra Film Awards	December 8, 2024	Best Comedy or Musical	A Real Pain	Nominated	
Astra Film Awards	December 8, 2024	Best Actor	Jesse Eisenberg	Nominated	
Astra Film Awards	December 8, 2024	Best Original Screenplay	Jesse Eisenberg	Won	
Astra Film Awards	December 8, 2024	Best Supporting Actor	Kieran Culkin	Won	
Atlanta Film Critics Circle Awards	December 9, 2024	Best Supporting Actor	Kieran Culkin	Won	
Austin Film Critics Association Awards	January 6, 2025	Best Supporting Actor	Kieran Culkin	Nominated	
Austin Film Critics Association Awards	January 6, 2025	Best Original Screenplay	Jesse Eisenberg	Nominated	
British Academy Film Awards	February 16, 2025	Best Original Screenplay	Jesse Eisenberg	Won	
British Academy Film Awards	February 16, 2025	Best Actor in a Supporting Role	Kieran Culkin	Won	
Capri Hollywood International Film Festival	January 2, 2025	Best Supporting Actor	Kieran Culkin	Won	
Casting Society of America Awards	February 12, 2025	Outstanding Achievement in Casting: Studio or Independent Feature – Comedy	Jessica Kelly	Nominated	
Chicago Film Critics Association Awards	December 11, 2024	Best Supporting Actor	Kieran Culkin	Won	
Chicago Film Critics Association Awards	December 11, 2024	Best Original Screenplay	Jesse Eisenberg	Won	
Chicago Indie Critics Awards	January 17, 2025	Best Original Screenplay	Jesse Eisenberg	Nominated	
Chicago Indie Critics Awards	January 17, 2025	Best Supporting Actor	Kieran Culkin	Nominated	
Critics Association of Central Florida Awards	January 2, 2025	Best Screenplay	Jesse Eisenberg	Runner-up	
Critics Association of Central Florida Awards	January 2, 2025	Best Supporting Actor	Kieran Culkin	Won	
Critics' Choice Movie Awards	February 7, 2025	Best Supporting Actor	Kieran Culkin	Won	
Critics' Choice Movie Awards	February 7, 2025	Best Original Screenplay	Jesse Eisenberg	Nominated	
Critics' Choice Movie Awards	February 7, 2025	Best Comedy	A Real Pain	Won (Note: Tied with Deadpool & Wolverine (2024).)	
Columbus Film Critics Association Awards	January 2, 2025	Frank Gabrenya Award for Best Comedy	A Real Pain	Nominated	
Columbus Film Critics Association Awards	January 2, 2025	Best Supporting Performance	Kieran Culkin	Won	
Columbus Film Critics Association Awards	January 2, 2025	Best Original Screenplay	Jesse Eisenberg	Nominated	
Dallas–Fort Worth Film Critics Association Awards	December 18, 2024	Best Picture	A Real Pain	Ninth place	
Dallas–Fort Worth Film Critics Association Awards	December 18, 2024	Best Supporting Actor	Kieran Culkin	Runner-up	
Denver Film Critics Society Awards	January 24, 2025	Best Supporting Performance by an Actor, Male	Kieran Culkin	Won	
Denver Film Critics Society Awards	January 24, 2025	Best Original Screenplay	Jesse Eisenberg	Nominated	
Dorian Awards	February 13, 2025	Supporting Film Performance of the Year	Kieran Culkin	Nominated	
Florida Film Critics Circle Awards	December 20, 2024	Best Actor	Kieran Culkin	Won	
Florida Film Critics Circle Awards	December 20, 2024	Best Original Screenplay	Jesse Eisenberg	Nominated	
Georgia Film Critics Association Awards	January 7, 2025	Best Supporting Actor	Kieran Culkin	Won	
Georgia Film Critics Association Awards	January 7, 2025	Best Original Screenplay	Jesse Eisenberg	Nominated	
GoldDerby Film Awards	February 11, 2025	Best Original Screenplay	Jesse Eisenberg	Nominated	
GoldDerby Film Awards	February 11, 2025	Best Supporting Actor	Kieran Culkin	Won	
Golden Globe Awards	January 5, 2025	Best Motion Picture – Musical or Comedy	A Real Pain	Nominated	
Golden Globe Awards	January 5, 2025	Best Actor – Motion Picture Musical or Comedy	Jesse Eisenberg	Nominated	
Golden Globe Awards	January 5, 2025	Best Screenplay	Jesse Eisenberg	Nominated	
Golden Globe Awards	January 5, 2025	Best Supporting Actor – Motion Picture	Kieran Culkin	Won	
Golden Tomato Awards	January 16, 2025	Best-Reviewed Drama Movie	A Real Pain	Won	
Gotham Awards	December 2, 2024	Outstanding Supporting Performance	Kieran Culkin	Nominated	
Greater Western New York Film Critics Association Awards	January 4, 2025	Best Picture	A Real Pain	Nominated	
Greater Western New York Film Critics Association Awards	January 4, 2025	Best Supporting Actor	Kieran Culkin	Won	
Greater Western New York Film Critics Association Awards	January 4, 2025	Best Original Screenplay	Jesse Eisenberg	Won	
Hawaii Film Critics Society Awards	January 13, 2025	Best Original Screenplay	Jesse Eisenberg	Won	
Hawaii Film Critics Society Awards	January 13, 2025	Best Supporting Actor	Kieran Culkin	Won	
Haifa International Film Festival	January 11, 2025	Best Film – Carmel International Cinema Competition	A Real Pain	Nominated	
Heartland International Film Festival	October 21, 2024	Humor & Humanity Award	A Real Pain	Won	
Houston Film Critics Society Awards	January 14, 2025	Best Picture	A Real Pain	Nominated	
Houston Film Critics Society Awards	January 14, 2025	Best Screenplay	Jesse Eisenberg	Nominated	
Houston Film Critics Society Awards	January 14, 2025	Best Supporting Actor	Kieran Culkin	Won	
Independent Spirit Awards	February 22, 2025	Best Supporting Performance	Kieran Culkin	Won	
Independent Spirit Awards	February 22, 2025	Best Screenplay	Jesse Eisenberg	Won	
Indiana Film Journalists Association Awards	December 16, 2024	Best Film	A Real Pain	Finalist	
Indiana Film Journalists Association Awards	December 16, 2024	Best Director	Jesse Eisenberg	Nominated	
Indiana Film Journalists Association Awards	December 16, 2024	Best Lead Performance	Jesse Eisenberg	Nominated	
Indiana Film Journalists Association Awards	December 16, 2024	Best Original Screenplay	Jesse Eisenberg	Nominated	
Indiana Film Journalists Association Awards	December 16, 2024	Best Supporting Performance	Kieran Culkin	Nominated	
Indiana Film Journalists Association Awards	December 16, 2024	Best Ensemble Acting	A Real Pain	Nominated	
IndieWire Critics Poll	December 16, 2024	Best Screenplay	Jesse Eisenberg	Runner-up	
Iowa Film Critics Association Awards	December 16, 2024	Best Supporting Actor	Kieran Culkin	Won	
Irish Film & Television Awards	February 14, 2025	Best International Actor	Kieran Culkin	Nominated	
Kansas City Film Critics Circle Awards	January 4, 2025	Best Film	A Real Pain	Nominated	
Kansas City Film Critics Circle Awards	January 4, 2025	Best Supporting Actor	Kieran Culkin	Won	
Kansas City Film Critics Circle Awards	January 4, 2025	Best Original Screenplay	Jesse Eisenberg	Nominated	
La Roche-sur-Yon International Film Festival	October 20, 2024	Grand Prix du Jury – Compétition internationale	A Real Pain	Nominated	
La Roche-sur-Yon International Film Festival	October 20, 2024	Prix spécial du jury – Compétition internationale	A Real Pain	Won	
Las Vegas Film Critics Society Awards	December 13, 2024	Best Supporting Actor	Kieran Culkin	Nominated	
Las Vegas Film Critics Society Awards	December 13, 2024	Best Screenplay – Original	Jesse Eisenberg	Nominated	
Las Vegas Film Critics Society Awards	December 13, 2024	Breakout Filmmaker of the Year	Jesse Eisenberg	Nominated	
Latino Entertainment Journalists Association Awards	February 17, 2025	Best Original Screenplay	Jesse Eisenberg	Nominated	
Latino Entertainment Journalists Association Awards	February 17, 2025	Best Supporting Actor	Kieran Culkin	Won	
London Film Critics' Circle Awards	February 2, 2025	Supporting Actor of the Year	Kieran Culkin	Won	
London Film Critics' Circle Awards	February 2, 2025	Screenwriter of the Year	Jesse Eisenberg	Won	
Los Angeles Film Critics Association Awards	December 8, 2024	Best Screenplay	Jesse Eisenberg	Won	
Los Angeles Film Critics Association Awards	December 8, 2024	Best Supporting Performance	Kieran Culkin	Won (Note: Shared with Yura Borisov for Anora (2024).)	
Mar del Plata International Film Festival	December 1, 2024	Best International Feature Film	Jesse Eisenberg	Nominated	
Michigan Movie Critics Guild Awards	December 9, 2024	Best Supporting Actor	Kieran Culkin	Nominated	
Minnesota Film Critics Association Awards	January 10, 2025	Best Supporting Actor	Kieran Culkin	Nominated	
Minnesota Film Critics Association Awards	January 10, 2025	Best Original Screenplay	Jesse Eisenberg	Nominated	
Music City Film Critics Association Awards	January 10, 2025	Best Screenplay	Jesse Eisenberg	Nominated	
Music City Film Critics Association Awards	January 10, 2025	Best Supporting Actor	Kieran Culkin	Won	
National Board of Review Awards	December 4, 2024	Top 10 Films	A Real Pain	Won	
National Board of Review Awards	December 4, 2024	Best Supporting Actor	Kieran Culkin	Won	
National Society of Film Critics Awards	January 4, 2025	Best Supporting Actor	Kieran Culkin	Won	
National Society of Film Critics Awards	January 4, 2025	Best Screenplay	Jesse Eisenberg	Won	
New Orleans Film Festival	October 22, 2024	Grand Jury Award – Narrative Feature	A Real Pain	Nominated	
Newport Beach Film Festival	October 31, 2024	Audience Award – Best Comedy	A Real Pain	Won	
Newport Beach Film Festival	October 31, 2024	Outstanding Performance – Male	Kieran Culkin	Won	
New York Film Critics Circle Awards	December 3, 2024	Best Supporting Actor	Kieran Culkin	Won	
New York Film Critics Online Awards	December 16, 2024	Best Supporting Actor	Kieran Culkin	Nominated	
New York Film Critics Online Awards	December 16, 2024	Best Screenplay	Jesse Eisenberg	Nominated	
North Carolina Film Critics Association Awards	January 3, 2025	Best Supporting Actor	Kieran Culkin	Won	
North Dakota Film Society Awards	January 13, 2025	Best Supporting Actor	Kieran Culkin	Nominated	
North Dakota Film Society Awards	January 13, 2025	Best Screenplay	Jesse Eisenberg	Nominated	
North Texas Film Critics Association Awards	December 30, 2024	Best Supporting Actor	Kieran Culkin	Won	
North Texas Film Critics Association Awards	December 30, 2024	Best Screenplay	Jesse Eisenberg	Nominated	
Online Association of Female Film Critics Awards	December 23, 2024	Best Original Screenplay	Jesse Eisenberg	Won	
Online Association of Female Film Critics Awards	December 23, 2024	Best Supporting Male	Kieran Culkin	Won	
Online Film Critics Society Awards	January 27, 2025	Best Supporting Actor	Kieran Culkin	Won	
Online Film Critics Society Awards	January 27, 2025	Best Original Screenplay	Jesse Eisenberg	Nominated	
Online Film & Television Association Awards	February 23, 2025	Best Picture	A Real Pain	10th place	
Online Film & Television Association Awards	February 23, 2025	Best Supporting Actor	Kieran Culkin	Won	
Online Film & Television Association Awards	February 23, 2025	Best Original Screenplay	Jesse Eisenberg	5th place	
Palm Springs International Film Festival	January 3, 2025	Breakthrough Performance Award	Kieran Culkin	Honored	
Philadelphia Film Critics Circle Awards	December 21, 2024	Best Supporting Actor	Kieran Culkin	Won	
Phoenix Critics Circle Awards	December 12, 2024	Best Supporting Actor	Kieran Culkin	Won	
Phoenix Critics Circle Awards	December 12, 2024	Best Screenplay	Jesse Eisenberg	Won	
Phoenix Film Critics Society Awards	December 16, 2024	Best Actor in a Supporting Role	Kieran Culkin	Won	
Polish Film Awards	March 10, 2025	Best Supporting Actor	Kieran Culkin	Nominated	
Polish Film Awards	March 10, 2025	Best Screenplay	Jesse Eisenberg	Nominated	
Portland Critics Association Awards	January 14, 2025	Best Supporting Performance (Male)	Kieran Culkin	Runner-up	
Portland Critics Association Awards	January 14, 2025	Best Screenplay	Jesse Eisenberg	Nominated	
Portland Critics Association Awards	January 14, 2025	Best Comedy Feature	A Real Pain	Runner-up	
Producers Guild of America Awards	February 8, 2025	Darryl F. Zanuck Award for Outstanding Producer of Theatrical Motion Pictures	A Real Pain	Nominated	
Robert Awards	January 31, 2026	Best English Language Film	Jesse Eisenberg	Nominated	
SCAD Savannah Film Festival	October 28, 2024	Virtuoso Award	Kieran Culkin	Honored	
Santa Barbara International Film Festival	February 15, 2025	Virtuoso Award	Kieran Culkin	Honored	
San Diego Film Critics Society Awards	December 9, 2024	Best Supporting Actor	Kieran Culkin	Won	
San Diego Film Critics Society Awards	December 9, 2024	Best Original Screenplay	Jesse Eisenberg	Nominated	
San Francisco Bay Area Film Critics Circle Awards	December 16, 2024	Best Original Screenplay	Jesse Eisenberg	Nominated	
San Francisco Bay Area Film Critics Circle Awards	December 16, 2024	Best Supporting Actor	Kieran Culkin	Nominated	
Satellite Awards	January 26, 2025	Best Motion Picture – Comedy or Musical	A Real Pain	Nominated	
Satellite Awards	January 26, 2025	Best Actor in a Motion Picture – Comedy or Musical	Jesse Eisenberg	Nominated	
Satellite Awards	January 26, 2025	Best Original Screenplay	Jesse Eisenberg	Won	
Satellite Awards	January 26, 2025	Best Actor in a Supporting Role	Kieran Culkin	Nominated	
Screen Actors Guild Awards	February 23, 2025	Outstanding Performance by a Male Actor in a Supporting Role	Kieran Culkin	Won	
Seattle Film Critics Society Awards	December 16, 2024	Best Screenplay	Jesse Eisenberg	Nominated	
Seattle Film Critics Society Awards	December 16, 2024	Best Supporting Actor	Kieran Culkin	Nominated	
Southeastern Film Critics Association	December 16, 2024	Best Supporting Actor	Kieran Culkin	Runner-up	
St. Louis Film Critics Association Awards	December 15, 2024	Best Supporting Actor	Kieran Culkin	Won	
St. Louis Film Critics Association Awards	December 15, 2024	Best Original Screenplay	Jesse Eisenberg	Nominated	
St. Louis Film Critics Association Awards	December 15, 2024	Best Comedy Film	A Real Pain	Nominated	
Sundance Film Festival	January 26, 2024	Grand Jury Prize – Dramatic	A Real Pain	Nominated	
Sundance Film Festival	January 26, 2024	Waldo Salt Screenwriting Award	Jesse Eisenberg	Won	
Toronto Film Critics Association Awards	December 15, 2024	Outstanding Supporting Performance	Kieran Culkin	Won	
Utah Film Critics Association Awards	January 11, 2025	Best Supporting Performance, Male	Kieran Culkin	Runner-up	
Utah Film Critics Association Awards	January 11, 2025	Best Screenplay	Jesse Eisenberg	Runner-up	
Valladolid International Film Festival	October 26, 2024	Punto de Encuentro Award	A Real Pain	Nominated	
Vancouver Film Critics Circle Awards	February 19, 2025	Best Picture	A Real Pain	Nominated	
Vancouver Film Critics Circle Awards	February 19, 2025	Best Screenplay	Jesse Eisenberg	Won	
Vancouver Film Critics Circle Awards	February 19, 2025	Best Supporting Male Actor	Kieran Culkin	Won	
Warsaw Jewish Film Festival	November 10, 2024	Grand Prix – POLIN	A Real Pain	Nominated	
Warsaw Jewish Film Festival	November 10, 2024	Best Narrative Feature	A Real Pain	Won	
Washington D.C. Area Film Critics Association Awards	December 8, 2024	Best Supporting Actor	Kieran Culkin	Won	
Washington D.C. Area Film Critics Association Awards	December 8, 2024	Best Original Screenplay	Jesse Eisenberg	Won	
Writers Guild of America Awards	February 15, 2025	Best Original Screenplay	Jesse Eisenberg	Nominated	

== See also ==
- 2024 in film
