= 2024 New York Film Critics Circle Awards =

90th New York Film Critics Circle Awards

90th NYFCC Awards
- Date: December 3, 2024

Highlights
- Best Picture: The Brutalist

The 90th New York Film Critics Circle Awards, honoring the best in film for 2024, were announced on December 3, 2024.

The annual gala awards dinner took place at Tao Downtown in New York on January 8, 2025, where a special anniversary program occurred to celebrate the 90th anniversary of the NYFCC.

== Winners ==
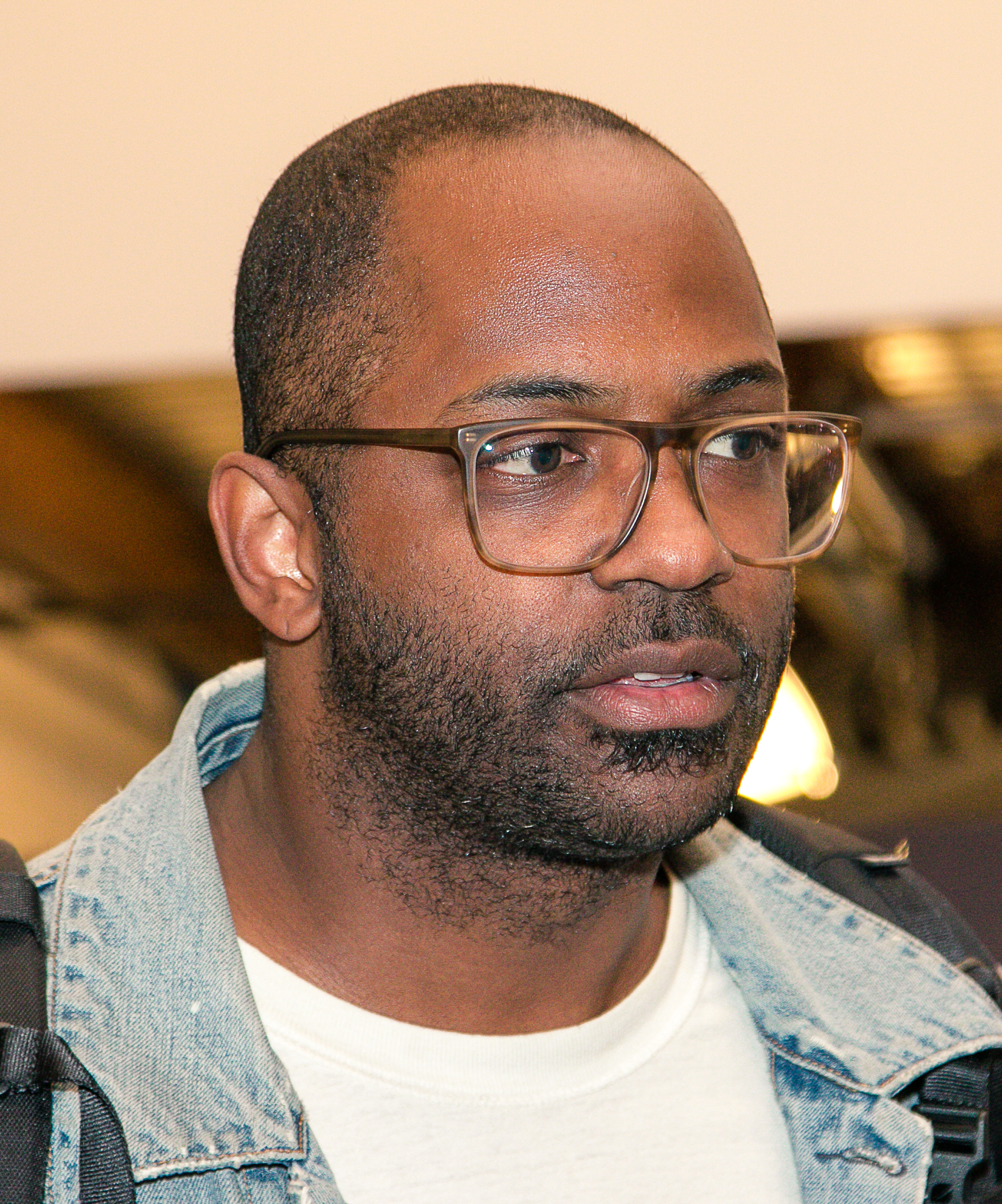
RaMell Ross, Best Director winner

Adrien Brody, Best Actor winner

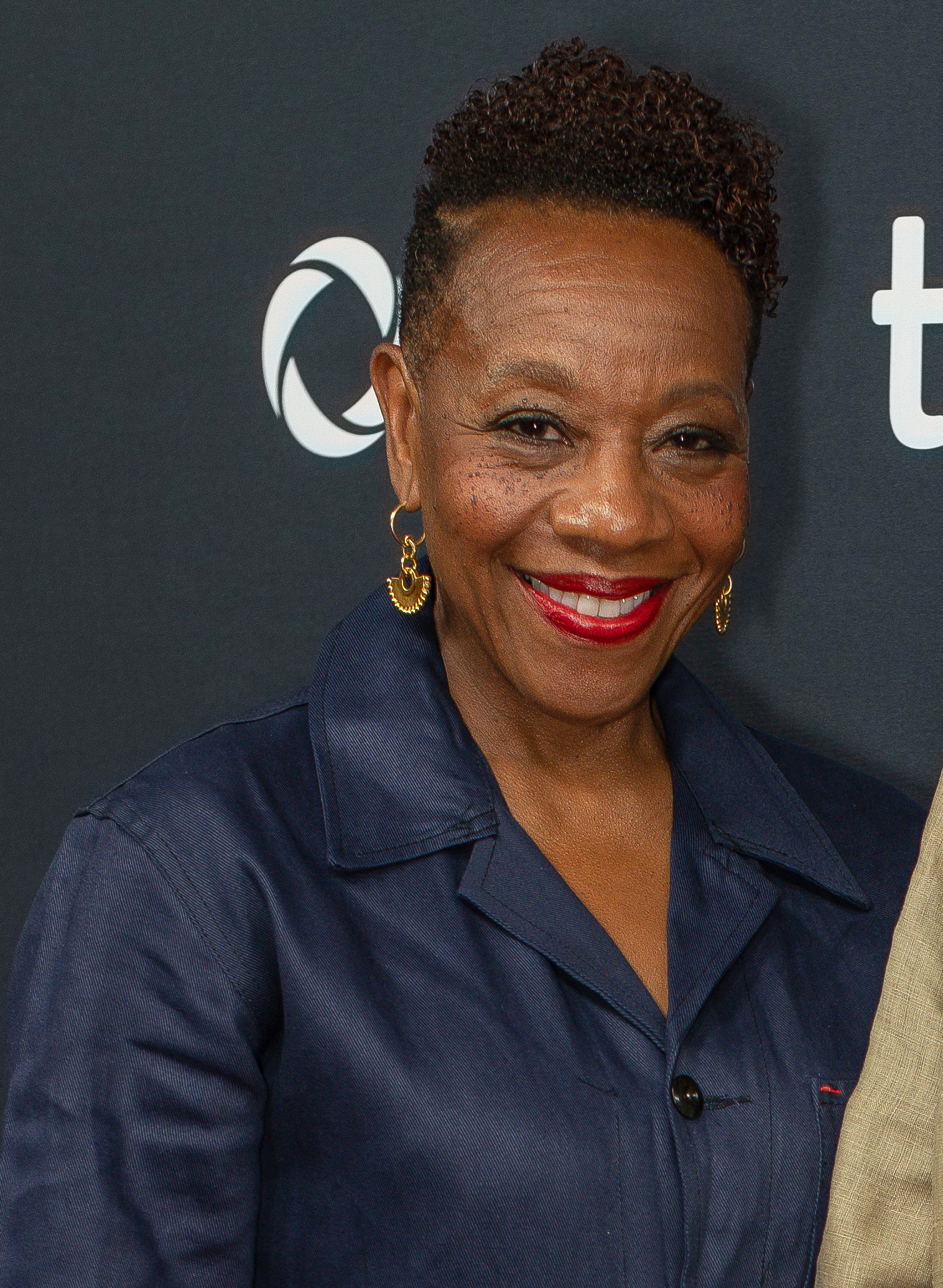
Marianne Jean-Baptiste, Best Actress winner

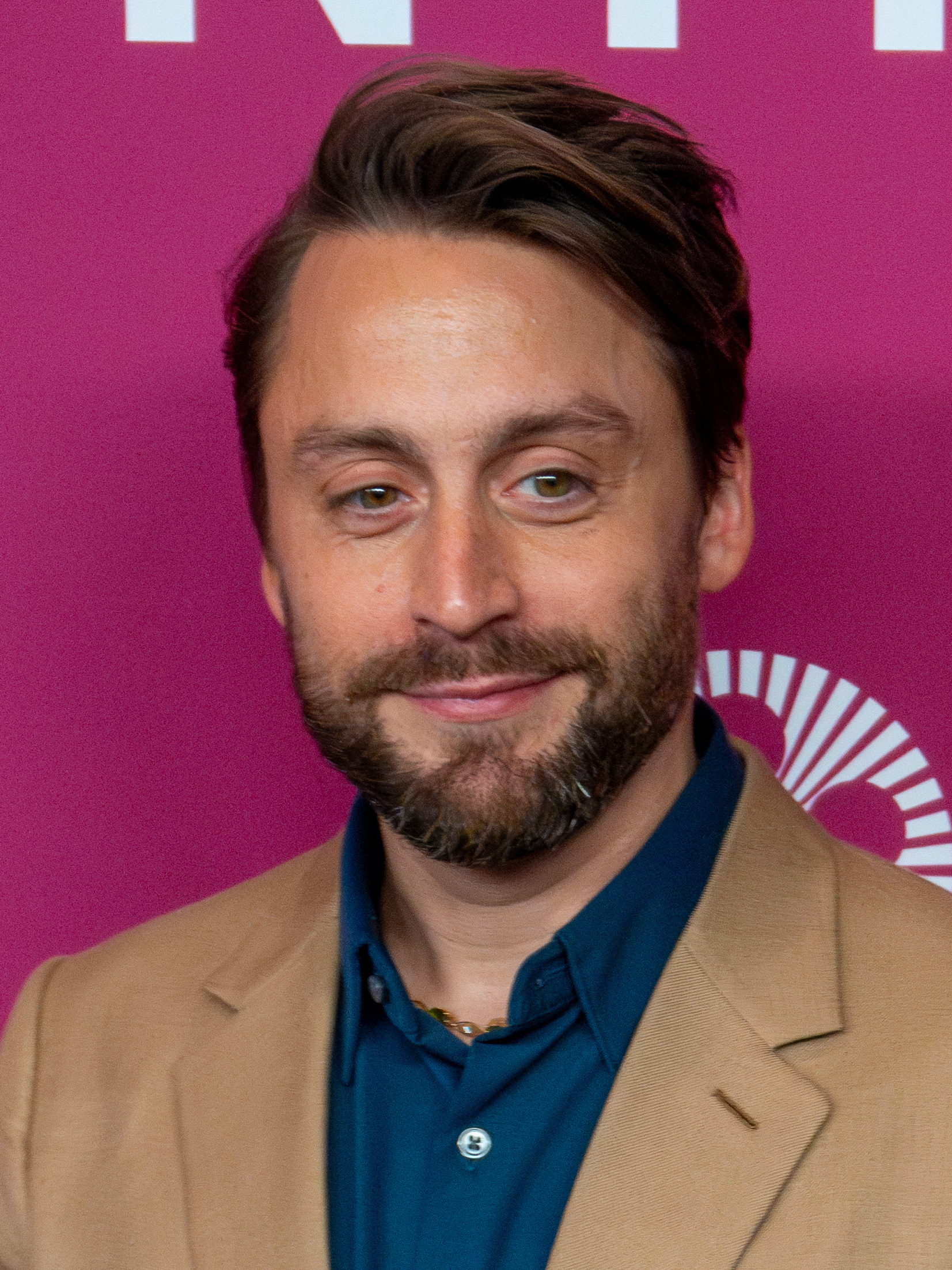
Kieran Culkin, Best Supporting Actor winner

- Best Film:
  - The Brutalist
- Best Director:
  - RaMell Ross – Nickel Boys
- Best Actor:
  - Adrien Brody – The Brutalist
- Best Actress:
  - Marianne Jean-Baptiste – Hard Truths
- Best Supporting Actor:
  - Kieran Culkin – A Real Pain
- Best Supporting Actress:
  - Carol Kane – Between the Temples
- Best Screenplay:
  - Sean Baker – Anora
- Best Animated Film:
  - Flow
- Best Cinematography:
  - Jomo Fray – Nickel Boys
- Best Non-Fiction Film:
  - No Other Land
- Best International Film:
  - All We Imagine as Light • India
- Best First Film:
  - Janet Planet
- Special Award:
  - To Save and Project: The MoMA International Festival of Film Preservation
- Special Mentions:
  - Cash prizes were awarded to two students focusing on film criticism/journalism attending college in the region:
    - Undergraduate – Alexander Swift (Vassar College)
    - Graduate – Drew Smith (New York University)
