= Tzvi Erez =

Israeli–Canadian classical pianist

Tzvi Erez צבי ארז
- Born: 1967 (age 58–59); Israel
- Genres: Classical
- Instrument: Piano
- Years active: 1986-present
- Label: Niv Classical
- Website: https://nivclassical.com/index.html

Tzvi Erez (Hebrew: צבי ארז; born 1967) is an Israeli–Canadian classical pianist and music producer.

== Early life and education ==
Erez was born in Israel in 1967 and began his piano studies at the age of six. He moved to Canada and graduated from The Royal Conservatory of Music, where he trained with Mildred Kenton, Andrew Burashko, and Antonín Kubalek.

== Recordings ==
During his education, Erez produced and collaborated with many artists and labels across multiple genres. He worked in production and distribution by Sony Music before receiving recognition for the albums Beethoven Piano Works (2000) and Tzvi Erez plays Chopin (2003) under Niv Classical. His interpretations and technique are documented on his YouTube channel, which has 99,400 followers.

Erez has released several performances accompanied by orchestral string players, including musicians from the Toronto Symphony Orchestra.

Erez has released over 44 albums worldwide, including Bach’s Piano Concerto No. 1, 4, 5 & 7, Well-Tempered Clavier, Partita 2, Goldberg Variations, Inventions & Sinfonias; Beethoven’s Piano Works, Sonatas, Piano Concerto Nos. 3 & 5; Chopin’s Complete Nocturnes, Waltzes, Ballades, Etudes, Preludes, Piano Concertos No. 1 & 2; Debussy’s Suite Bergamasque; Liszt's Piano Concerto 1 and solo pieces; Erik Satie’s Gymnopedies, Gnossiennes, and Cold Pieces; Mussorgsky’s Pictures at an Exhibition; Essential Classics, Masterpieces, Sentimental, Mozart’s Piano Sonatas, Mozart's Piano Concerto No. 23, Rachmaninoff's Concerto No. 2 & 3, Rhapsody on a Theme of Paganini, the Grieg Piano Concerto, the Robert Schumann Piano Concerto, the Tchaikovsky Piano Concerto, the Mendelssohn Piano Concerto, and others.

Erez is active in new classical recordings (including immersive sound productions), teaching piano performance, and classical music research. He produces music for various artists across genres, produces, and licenses music for film and television.

== Music in film and television ==
Erez's recordings are featured in the 1986 documentary The Twice Promised Land (produced by David Ostriker), the third season of Rectify (produced by Aden Young), the 2022 film When You Finish Saving the World (directed by Jesse Eisenberg), the third season of The Morning Show (produced by and starring Jennifer Aniston and Reese Witherspoon), and the film A Real Pain starring Jesse Eisenberg, Kieran Culkin, and Jennifer Grey.
