= Liza Sadovy =

British actress

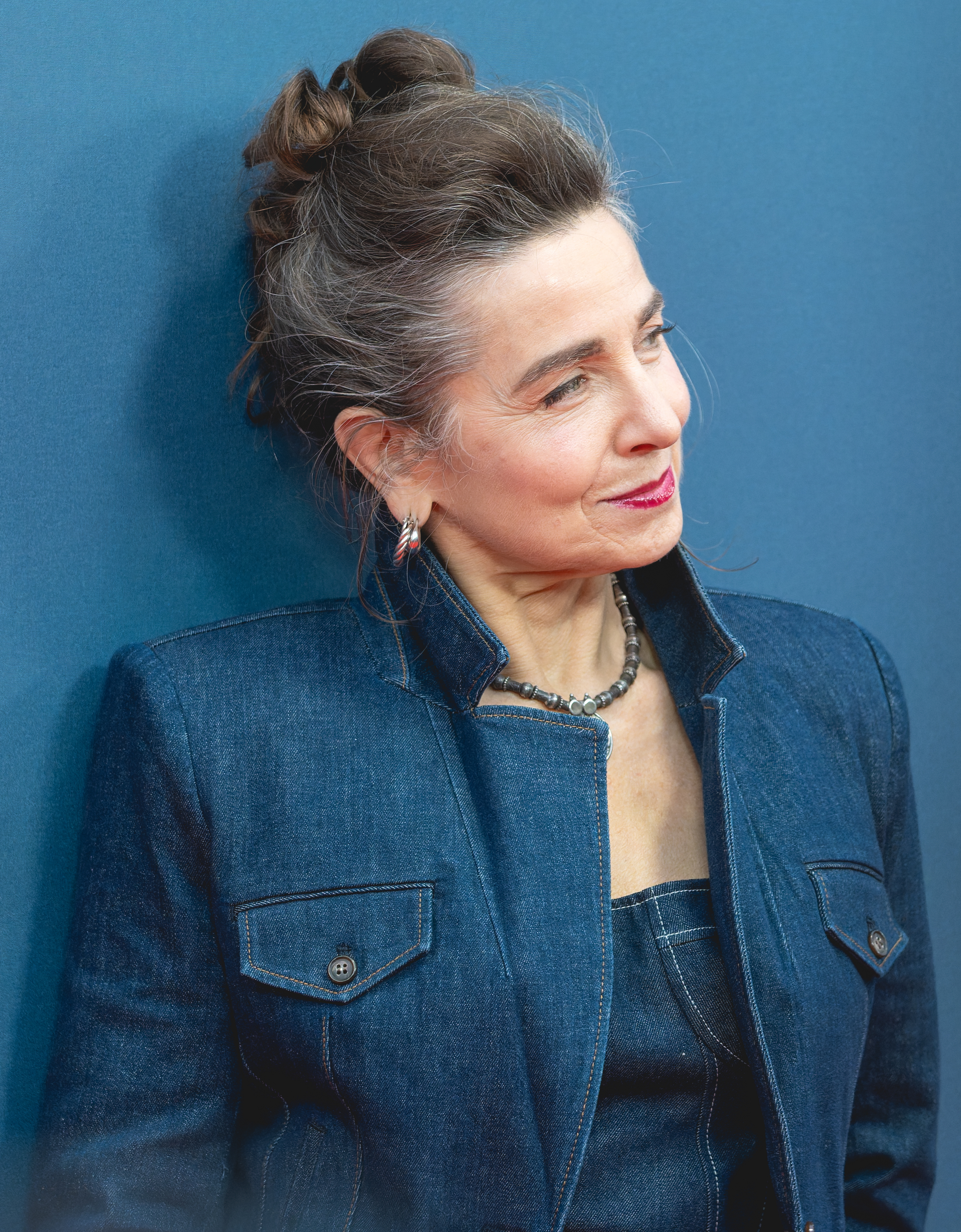

Liza Sadovy is a British actress. She is best known for Sweeney Todd: The Demon Barber of Fleet Street (2007), Prime Suspect 3 (1993), and Company (1996). Other television work includes Extras with Ricky Gervais, Midsomer Murders, Babylon, The Honourable Woman, Doctors, EastEnders, Emma, A Small Light, and Vera. Sadovy had a supporting role in the 2024 film A Real Pain.

Sadovy went to drama school in the late 1970s and his distant Russian ancestry.

Sadovy has appeared in numerous theatrical productions in London and New York. Most notably as Madame Morrible in Wicked, Lucinda in Into the Woods, Yvonne in Sunday in the Park with George, and most recently as Fräulein Schneider in Cabaret, for which she won the Olivier Award for Best Actress in a Supporting Role in a Musical.

== Filmography ==
=== Film ===
| Year | Title | Role | Notes |
|---|---|---|---|
| 1985 | Billy the Kid and the Green Baize Vampire | (unknown) | |
| 2002 | Alice in Wonderland and Through the Looking-Glass | The Queen of Hearts / The Red Queen | Direct-to-Video |
| 2007 | Sweeney Todd: The Demon Barber of Fleet Street | Pie Customer | |
| 2012 | The Knot | Mrs. Giddings | |
| 2017 | Disobedience | Rebbetzin Goldfarb | |
| 2019 | National Theatre Live: I'm Not Running | Blaise Gibson | Filmed live on 31 January 2019 |
| 2019 | National Theatre Live: Present Laughter | Miss Erikson / Lady Saltburn | Filmed live on 28 November 2019 |
| 2022 | Kavita and Teresa | Mother Superior | |
| 2024 | A Real Pain | Diane | |

=== Television ===
| Year | Title | Role | Notes |
|---|---|---|---|
| 1982 | I Remember Nelson | Royal Child | Mini-series; episodes: "Love" & "Passion" |
| 1984 | Deadly Virtues | (unknown) | Television film |
| 1986 | Lytton's Diary | Make Up Girl | Episode: "The Ancien Régime" |
| 1986 | ScreenPlay | Sarah | Episode: "Blood, Sweat and Tears" |
| 1989 | Hard Cases | WPC | Episode: #2.2 |
| 1990 | Casualty | Myra | Episode: "Love's a Pain" |
| 1990 | Tygo Road | Paola | Episode: #1.5 |
| 1991 | Tonight at 8.30 | Harriet | Episode: "Family Album" |
| 1991 | An Actor's Life for Me | Algy | Episode: "Not Suitable for Parents" |
| 1992–1993 | Growing Pains | Sonia | 5 episodes (series 1 & 2) |
| 1993 | Prime Suspect | WPC Kathy Bibby | 2 episodes: "Keeper of Souls: Parts 1 & 2" (series 3) |
| 1995 | The Bill | Heather Foley | Episode: "Ties That Bind" |
| 1995 | Castles | Naomi Robins | 7 episodes |
| 1997 | Performance | Jenny | Episode: "Company" |
| 1998 | EastEnders | Rene | 1 episode |
| 1998 | Nightworld: 30 Years to Life | Doctor | Television film |
| 1998 | Grafters | Estate Agent | Episode: #1.8 |
| 2003 | The Bill | Carrie Manola | Episode: "Thinking Out Loud" |
| 2003 | Casualty | Fiona Laing | Episode: "Three in a Bed" |
| 2004 | Midsomer Murders | Rosetta Price | Episode: "Things That Go Bump in the Night" |
| 2005 | Extras | Jackie Greer | Episode: "Ben Stiller" |
| 2009 | Doctors | Marie Dennan | Episode: "Hang Onto Nurse" |
| 2009 | Emma | Mrs. Cole | Mini-series; 2 episodes |
| 2009 | The Sarah Jane Adventures | Miss Trupp | 2 episodes: "Mona Lisa's Revenge: Parts 1 & 2" (series 3) |
| 2012 | Doctors | Suzy Marshall | Episode: "Host Family" |
| 2013 | EastEnders | Nurse Ellen | 2 episodes |
| 2014 | The Honourable Woman | British News Reporter | Mini-series; episodes: "The Ribbon Cutter" & "Two Hearts" |
| 2014 | Doctors | Martha Hargreave | Episode: "Gold Diggers" |
| 2014 | Babylon | Caroline Carey | Mini-series; 3 episodes |
| 2016 | Doctors | Marie Soames | Episode: "Victimless Crime" |
| 2020 | Vera | Wilma Howland | Episode: "The Escape Turn" |
| 2021 | Ridley Road | Mrs. Klein | Episode: #1.2 |
| 2023 | A Small Light | Mrs. Stoppelman | Mini-series; 5 episodes |
| 2023 | Outlander | Maisie Tolliver | Episode: "A Life Well Lost" |
| 2024 | Strike | Mariam | 2 episodes: "The Ink Black Heart: Parts 1 & 2" (series 6) |
| 2025 | The Rumour | Kay | 5 episodes |
| 2025–2026 | Patience | Dr. Loretta Parsons | 14 episodes (series 1 & 2) |
| 2026 | Bookish | Ruth Kleinmann | 2 episodes: "Dead Man's Whistle: Parts 1 & 2" (series 2) |

=== Video games ===
| Year | Title | Voice Role | Notes |
|---|---|---|---|
| 2019 | Greedfall | Mother Bishop Cornelia / other characters | |
| 2021 | It Takes Two | Additional voices | |
| 2022 | Steelrising | Gabrielle de Polignac / Suzanne Necker / additional voices | |
| 2025 | The First Berserker: Khazan | Quimuk | English version |
| 2025 | Cronos: The New Dawn | Additional voice | |
