= Kieran Culkin =

American actor (born 1982)

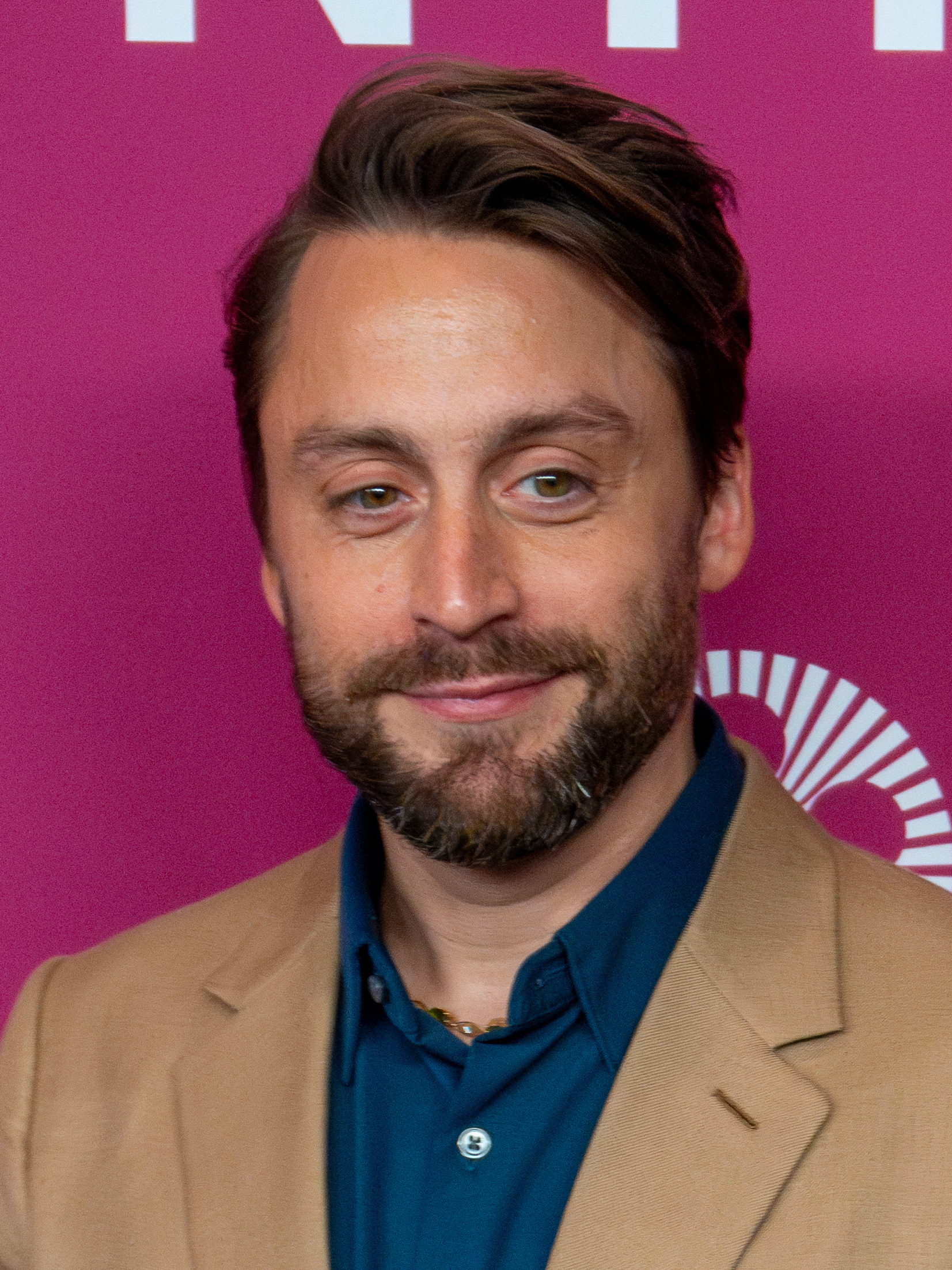
- Culkin in 2024
- Born: Kieran Kyle Culkin; September 30, 1982 (age 44); New York City, U.S.
- Occupation: Actor
- Years active: 1988–present
- Works: Full list
- Spouse: Jazz Charton (m. 2013)
- Children: 3
- Father: Kit Culkin
- Relatives: Macaulay Culkin (brother); Rory Culkin (brother); Bonnie Bedelia (aunt)
- Awards: Full list

Kieran Kyle Culkin (born September 30, 1982) is an American actor. Known for his performances of distasteful yet sympathetic characters across stage and screen, he has received numerous accolades, including an Academy Award, a BAFTA Award, two Golden Globe Awards, and a Primetime Emmy Award.

Culkin began his career as a child actor in off-Broadway theater productions. He made his feature film debut alongside his older brother, Macaulay, in the Christmas comedy Home Alone (1990). After achieving his breakthrough role as a sardonic teenager in the comedy-drama Igby Goes Down (2002), Culkin took a break from the screen due to personal conflicts. He returned to film six years later by playing Wallace Wells in the action comedy Scott Pilgrim vs. the World (2010). He won the Academy Award for Best Supporting Actor for his role as a free-spirited Jewish drifter in the comedy-drama A Real Pain (2024).

On television, Culkin found a career resurgence with his portrayal of Roman Roy in the HBO drama series Succession (2018–2023). His voice acting work includes roles in Solar Opposites (2022–2025) and Scott Pilgrim Takes Off (2023). On stage, Culkin starred in the West End and Broadway productions of Kenneth Lonergan's This Is Our Youth. He also portrayed Richard Roma in the Broadway revival of David Mamet's Glengarry Glen Ross (2025).

== Early life ==
Kieran Kyle Culkin was born on September 30, 1982, in New York City. He was the fourth of seven children born to Christopher "Kit" Culkin and Patricia Brentrup. His father is a former stage actor, and his mother, a native of North Dakota, worked as a road traffic controller in Sundance, Wyoming. Culkin was raised Catholic with his six siblings: Shane, Dakota, Macaulay, Quinn, Christian, and Rory. He had an older half-sister, Jennifer Adamson, from his father's previous relationship. Actress Bonnie Bedelia is his paternal aunt. Culkin has German, Irish, and Norwegian ancestry.

For the first nine years of his life, Culkin and his family lived in a railroad apartment in Yorkville and struggled financially. The tenement was "barely suitable for a couple," Culkin explained to Vanity Fair. "It was just a hallway, and there were no separating doors, except for the bathroom, which didn't have a lock. [His parents] raised seven kids in that apartment—for years! They just kept bringing babies home to this little space." Because his father served as a sacristan at the St. Joseph's Church of Yorkville, Culkin attended its Catholic school for free until the third grade. He then studied theater, film and television at the Professional Children's School, but dropped out during his senior year of high school.

Culkin was "loved unconditionally" by his mother, and considers her to be his only parent. He was neglected by his father throughout his childhood and only remembers him as being a "constant, unwelcome presence" in the household. His mother handled all of the children's necessities while balancing night shifts as a telephone operator for a theatrical casting agency. According to the family's longtime talent manager, Emily Gerson Saines, his mother maintained "strong family values, like the family having a meal together, the Christmas tree, Thanksgiving. These are all important things to [Brentrup], and she instilled that in her kids." After living together for more than twenty years, Culkin's parents separated in March 1995. (Note: Culkin's parents were never married.) Brentrup was awarded sole custody of five of their seven children following a two-year, highly publicized custody battle. (Note: The two eldest children, Shane and Dakota, were not named in the custody arrangement as they were both over the age of 18.) Culkin maintained a "great" relationship with his mother, but has been estranged from his father since.

== Career ==
=== 1988–1995: Early work ===
Culkin was raised as a performer and started acting at the age of two. Some of his earliest memories involve being led by his father's hand into Central Park and posing for headshots. His career began when a stage manager who worked for the Light Opera of Manhattan, an off-Broadway repertory theatre, heard the company needed some children for their productions. The manager relayed the message to Culkin's parents, who offered their children with no hesitation. Culkin started auditioning for roles with his older siblings when he was six years old. His first professional gig was through a television commercial based on learning disabilities; he was repeatedly berated by the unnamed director in a failed attempt to make him method act.

At age seven, Culkin made his feature film debut as Fuller McCallister, the youngest cousin of the protagonist Kevin McCallister (played by his brother Macaulay), in the Christmas comedy Home Alone (1990). He had "no idea" what the film was about while he was filming; the only notes he received from the filmmakers was, "Drink this Coke, wear the glasses, say the thing you memorized, look cute, and go home." Devin Ratray, who played Buzz McCallister, successfully convinced Culkin to believe that the film was actually about his character. Home Alone was originally met with mixed-to-positive reviews from critics. Culkin's small role was deemed memorable for its Pepsi product placement and bedwetting tendencies. Home Alone later became the second-highest-grossing Christmas film of all time, and was hailed as a Christmas classic.

In 1991, Culkin had minor roles in the romantic comedies Only the Lonely, which received mixed reviews, and Father of the Bride, which earned positive reviews. He was nominated for a Young Artist Award for Best Young Actor Co-Starring in a Motion Picture for his performance in the latter. Culkin reprised his role as Fuller McCallister in Home Alone 2: Lost in New York (1992), the sequel to Home Alone. His later appearances in Nowhere to Run (1993), My Summer Story (1994), and Father of the Bride Part II (1995) also received negative-to-mixed reviews.

=== 1996–2002: Breakthrough with Igby Goes Down ===
Culkin alternated between lead roles in independent films and small parts in mainstream films as he entered adolescence. In 1996, he starred as a farm boy who overcomes his fear of animals in Bobby Roth's Amanda and was a guest caller on the fourth season of the television sitcom Frasier. He then starred as a boy suffering from Morquio syndrome in the coming-of-age film The Mighty (1998), which earned him a nomination for the Young Artist Award for Best Leading Young Actor in a Feature Film. Peter Chelsom, its director, was the first filmmaker that treated Culkin like a serious actor: "He talked to me like an adult. Before that, directors would just tell me what to do. I'd have no input. But [Chelsom] taught me how to study my lines and take them apart and how to dissect my character. I had no idea there was a real process to acting before that."

The following year, Culkin appeared in Wes Craven's Music of the Heart, a biographical film about violinist Roberta Guaspari. He also had supporting roles in the teen comedy She's All That, which grossed over $100 million worldwide against a production budget of $7–10 million, and Lasse Hallström's drama The Cider House Rules, which grossed over $88 million worldwide. Culkin returned to the stage in 2000 with The Moment When, an off-Broadway romantic comedy play by James Lapine that explored the lives of New York City's arts-and-lits set. During a performance, he got his co-stars Arija Bareikis, Mark Ruffalo and Phyllis Newman high by swapping a prop joint for a real one.

Culkin starred in his first regular role in a television series with the short-lived NBC sitcom Go Fish (2001). He appeared in two feature directorial debuts the following year: Peter Care's The Dangerous Lives of Altar Boys as a mischievous Catholic schoolboy and Burr Steers's Igby Goes Down as the rebellious and sardonic teenager Jason "Igby" Slocumb Jr. Film critic Stephen Holden for The New York Times praised both comedy-dramas, but found Culkin's breakthrough performance in the latter to be "even richer" than the former. For his work on Igby Goes Down, Culkin won the Critics' Choice Movie Award for Best Young Actor/Actress and was nominated for the Golden Globe Award for Best Actor in a Motion Picture – Musical or Comedy.

=== 2003–2017: Screen hiatus and theatre work ===
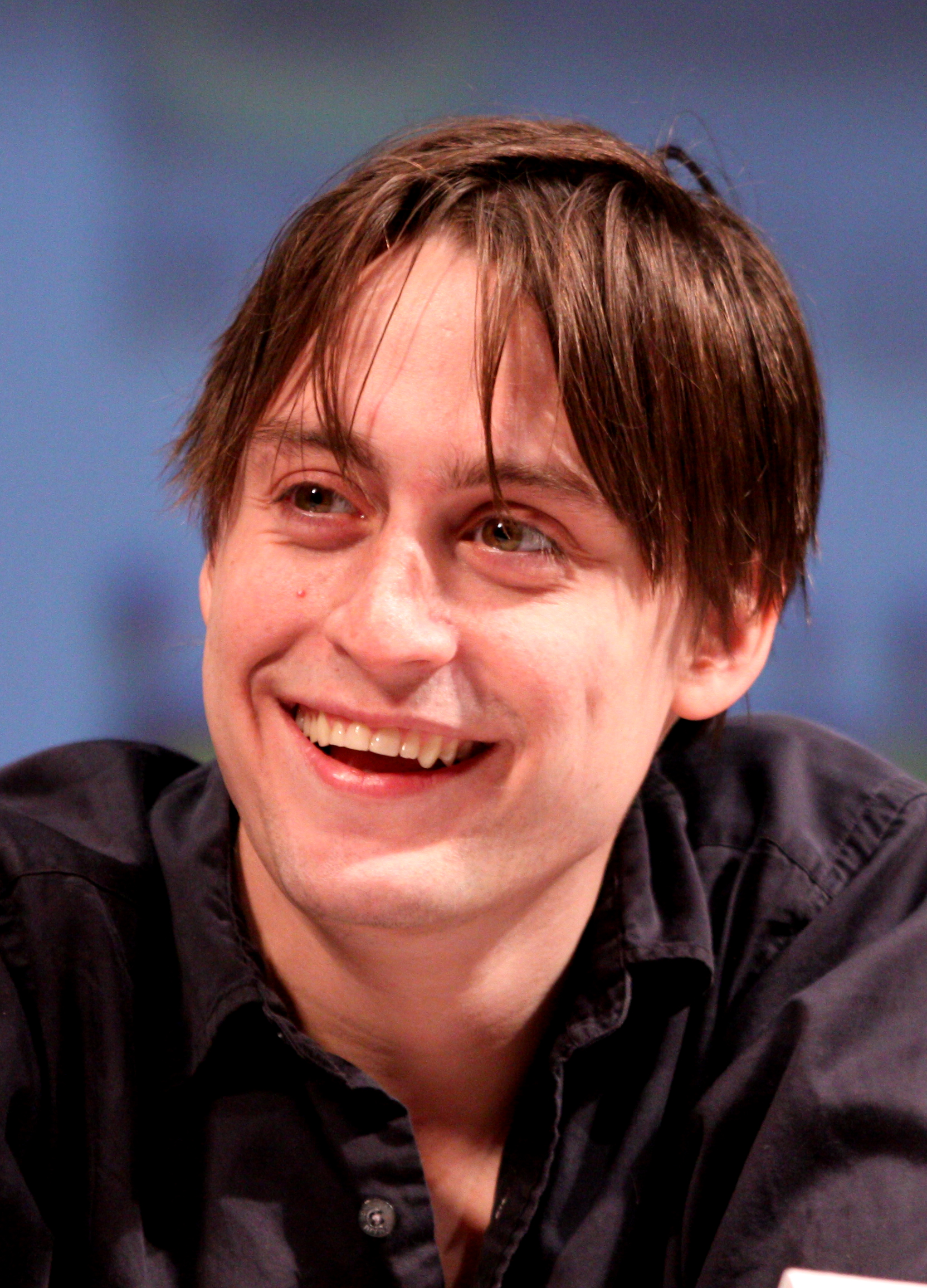
Culkin at a panel for Scott Pilgrim vs. the World during San Diego Comic-Con in 2010

Igby Goes Down was the first gig that profoundly impacted Culkin's personal life. He realized in the midst of the film's success that acting had become his career, which was "terrifying" because he was never granted the decision to pursue it. As he needed time to figure out whether he genuinely wanted to be an actor or not, he took a break from the film and television industries and only focused on the acting jobs that interested him the most.

Culkin mostly gravitated towards theatre during his hiatus, starting as a replacement for Jake Gyllenhaal in Kenneth Lonergan's West End production of This Is Our Youth (2002–2003) at the Garrick Theatre. The "dream play" was the second gig that deeply affected Culkin, as he spent eight years convincing Lonergan to let him play the co-lead role of Warren Straub. For Gina Gionfriddo's After Ashley (2005) at the Vineyard Theatre, he played a young man growing up in a dysfunctional family. The role won him an Obie Award for Distinguished Performance. In 2006, Culkin starred in Eric Bogosian's off-Broadway revival of SubUrbia, and made his on-Broadway debut by appearing in Julia Cho's one-act play First Tree in Antarctica. He reunited with Lonergan for The Starry Messenger (2009), a cosmic drama, at the Acorn Theatre. Culkin headlined multiple revival runs of This Is Our Youth as Dennis Ziegler for the Sydney Opera House, the Steppenwolf Theatre Company, and the Cort Theatre.

Culkin made his intermittent return to the screen with Derick Martini's Lymelife (2008), a teen comedy film, executive-produced by Martin Scorsese. His next release was Kieran and Michele Mulroney's comedy-drama Paper Man (2009), which disappointed critics. In Edgar Wright's action comedy Scott Pilgrim vs. the World (2010), Culkin portrayed the titular character's "cool gay roommate" Wallace Wells. He was frequently described by critics as one of the film's scene stealers, although it bombed at the box office. Culkin played a small role in Lonergan's psychological drama Margaret (2011), before starring in the critically panned comedies Movie 43 (2013) and Quitters (2015). On television, he had a guest role in the second season of the crime drama series Fargo (2015). The following year, he starred in the ensemble cast of Todd Solondz's anthology film Wiener-Dog (2016). Culkin recalled feeling comfortable with acting while he was filming the science fiction comedy Infinity Baby (2017), and began settling into it being something he would do for a living.

=== 2018–present: Succession and expansion ===
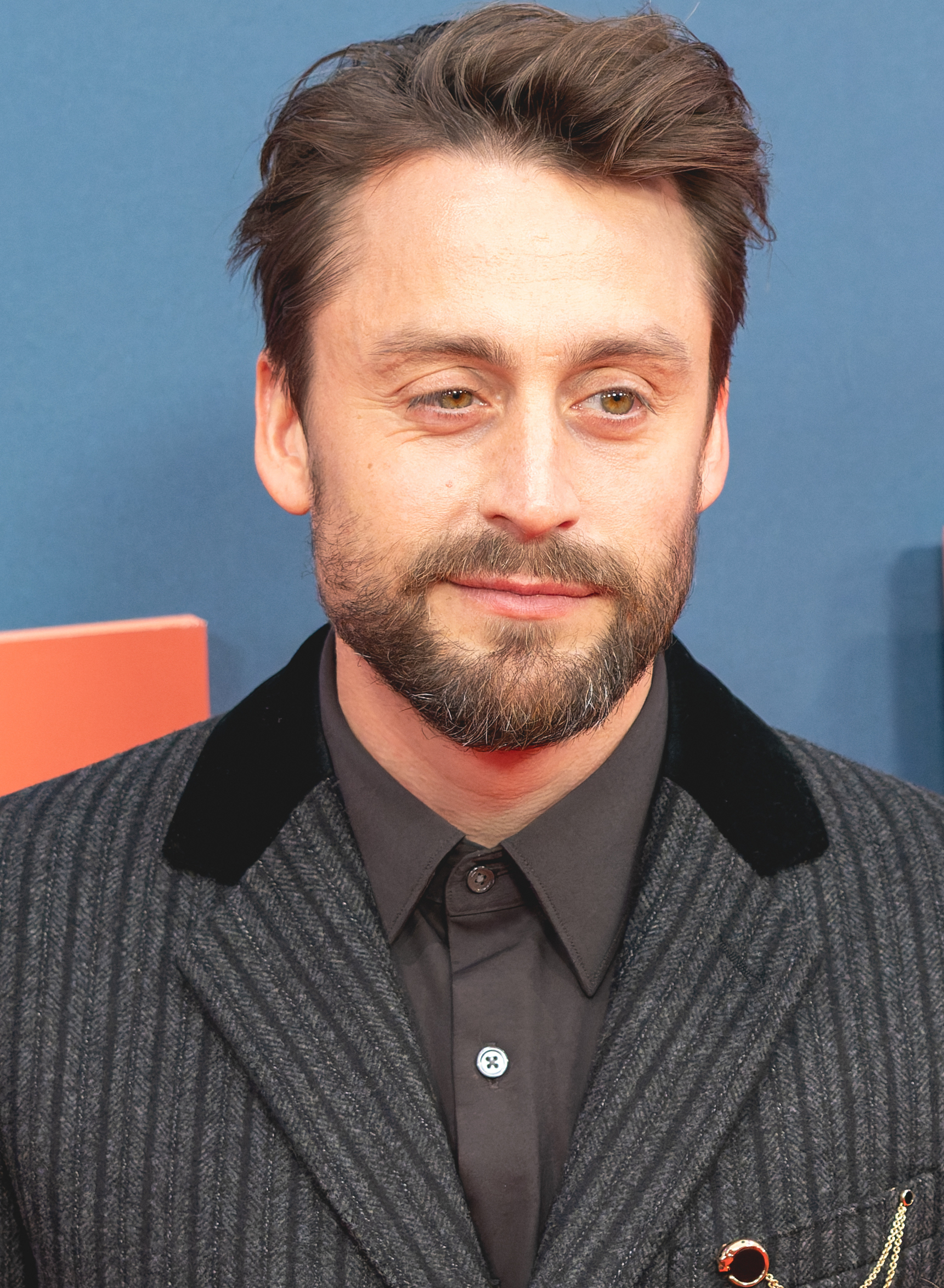
Culkin at the screening of A Real Pain during the 2024 BFI London Film Festival

From 2018 to 2023, Culkin received renewed recognition from mainstream audiences for his lead role as Roman Roy, an immature and irresponsible media executive, in the HBO black comedy-drama series Succession. He credits the series with solidifying his desire to be an actor. Culkin's performance, especially in the final season, earned critical acclaim and numerous accolades, including the Primetime Emmy Award for Outstanding Lead Actor in a Drama Series, the Golden Globe Award for Best Actor in a Television Series – Drama, two Critics' Choice Television Awards, and two Screen Actors Guild Awards.

Set during the COVID-19 pandemic, Culkin reunited with the Father of the Bride cast for its legacy-sequel short film (2020). He played a supporting role in Steven Soderbergh's crime thriller No Sudden Move (2021), and hosted the November 6, 2021 episode of the variety series Saturday Night Live; marking thirty years since his brother Macaulay anchored. In 2022, Culkin narrated the documentary miniseries Gaming Wall Street and joined the adult animated sitcom Solar Opposites as a recurring character. He returned to his role as Wallace Wells for the anime series Scott Pilgrim Takes Off (2023).

The 2024 Sundance Film Festival marked the release of Jesse Eisenberg's buddy comedy film A Real Pain, Culkin's first major project post-Succession. He played Benjamin "Benji" Kaplan, a free-spirited and mentally unstable drifter who travels to Poland with his cousin David (played by Eisenberg) to honor their late grandmother and connect with their Polish-Jewish heritage. Culkin's performance was universally praised by critics. Owen Gleiberman of Variety called it a "sensational piece of acting", while The Washington Post's Ty Burr found it "both liberating and touched by a deeper, more inarticulate sadness". Culkin earned several accolades for his work, including the Academy Award, the BAFTA Award, the Golden Globe Award, and the Screen Actors Guild Award for Best Supporting Actor.

In 2025, Culkin returned to the stage as Richard Roma in Patrick Marber's Broadway revival of Glengarry Glen Ross, opposite Bob Odenkirk and Bill Burr. Culkin's performance polarized theater critics, with some opining that he was miscast. Next, Culkin portrayed Squealer in Andy Serkis' animated film adaptation of Animal Farm, and Caesar Flickerman in Francis Lawrence's The Hunger Games: Sunrise on the Reaping (2026).

== Reception and artistry ==
The truth is, [Culkin] is one of my most favorite scene partners I've had in the seven years of working on Succession. While he and I clash on some levels and have not always seen eye to eye, I count him as a brother in arms.

— Jeremy Strong on Culkin

Culkin's approach to acting is based on "bringing life to someone else, but also realizing that person is somewhere inside you." He is known for his "versatile and dynamic" performances, which often blends "impeccable" comedic timing with "surprising" depth and complexity. Alex Moreland of National World believed that Culkin's performance in the penultimate episode of Succession was the crowning moment of his career, "a remarkable achievement for the actor that stands head and shoulders above all the other remarkable achievements he's made so far on the show."

Succession encouraged its actors to improvise, which Culkin disliked at first due to being theatrically trained. He soon developed a free-associative style of acting in which he learned his lines shortly before delivering them, declined to stand on his marker, and frequently experimented with the temperature of his performance. Such techniques have been referred to as a form of improvisation, but he prefers to call it blagging because he believes that improv must have a "certain feel" to it. Culkin's methods contrasted with his co-star Jeremy Strong's labor-intensive acting style, but Strong's process was not intrusive upon his own. "Some actors—me—need a certain amount of doggedness and labor and hyper-focus to get there," Strong explained to The Times. "[Culkin] just is there. There's no sweat equity, and he is unburdened by analysis. [Culkin] has an incredibly agile mind, but, what's more, he is as open and as present an actor as I've ever encountered. It makes working with him an experience of touching the third rail, which is what you want."

== Public image ==
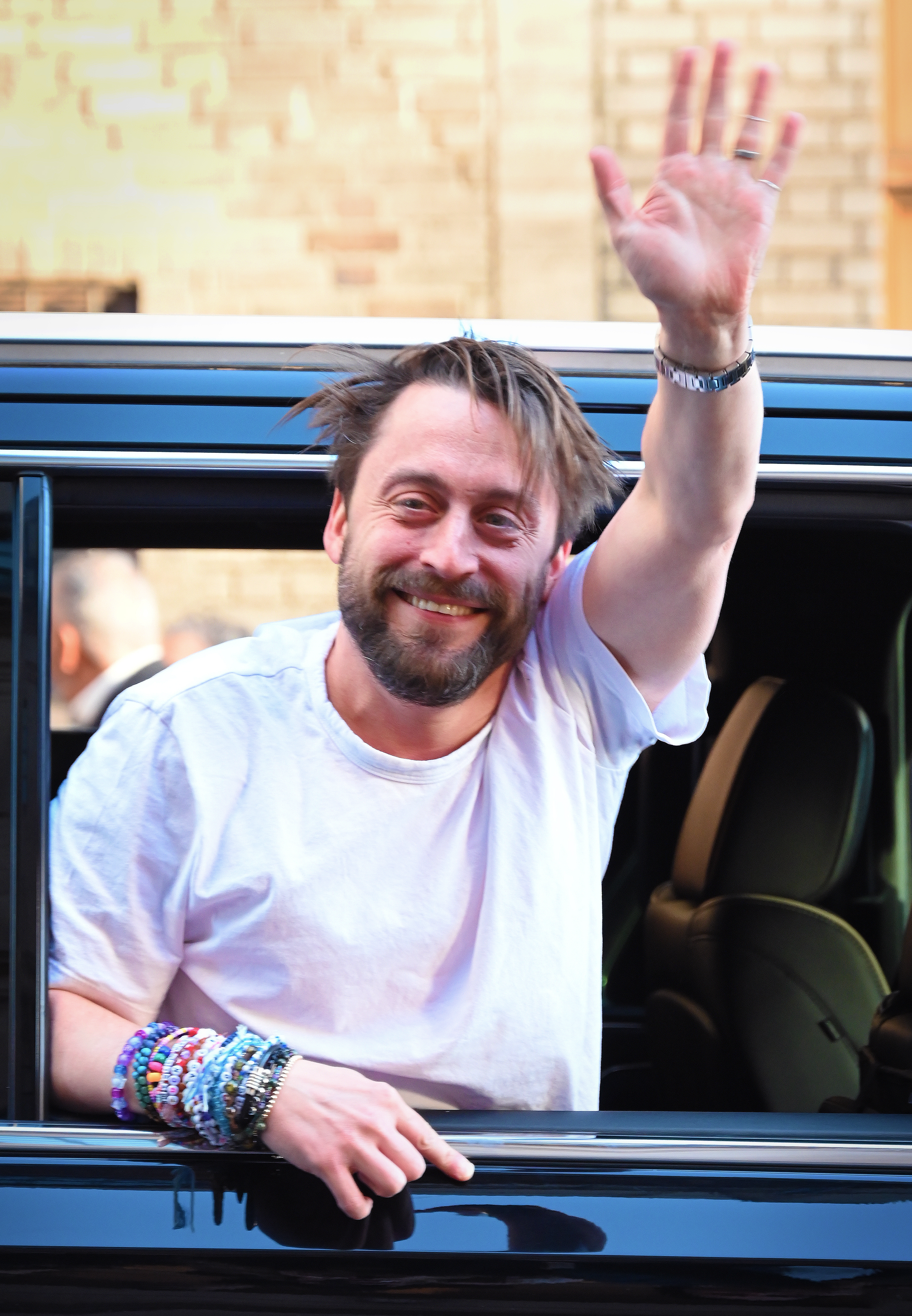
Culkin seen wearing several friendship bracelets on his right arm, which is regarded as his trademark feature

Culkin has a complicated relationship with celebrity culture, having been exposed to his brother Macaulay's fame at a young age. He mistrusted mainstream media outlets following the release of Home Alone because of how the press treated his family. During his parents' separation and subsequent custody battle in 1995, a 13-year-old Culkin delivered a handwritten note to the New York Supreme Court requesting to bar the media from entering the courtroom. His plea to "spare [his] family from any further embarrassment" was denied by a judge. As of 2023, Culkin refuses to speak to Access Hollywood and the New York Post due to their respective coverage of his family.

Journalists have written about Culkin's charismatic and "chaotic" personality. The Daily Telegraph's Teo van den Broeke called him "Hollywood's most likeable rascal", while Charlotte Edwardes of The Guardian dubbed him a Manic Pixie Dream Guy. His awards acceptance speeches attracted significant media attention, especially pertaining to an in-joke with his wife about wanting more children. Culkin has also been labeled as a style icon, with his incorporation of accessories listed as his trademark feature. Fashion critics noticed his recurring motif of wearing an assortment of rings, nail polishes and friendship bracelets on his right arm, drawing comparisons to musicians Lenny Kravitz and Taylor Swift. In March 2023, Culkin starred in COS' spring–summer campaign and became a brand ambassador for Zegna. He also developed a creative partnership with Dior.

== Personal life ==
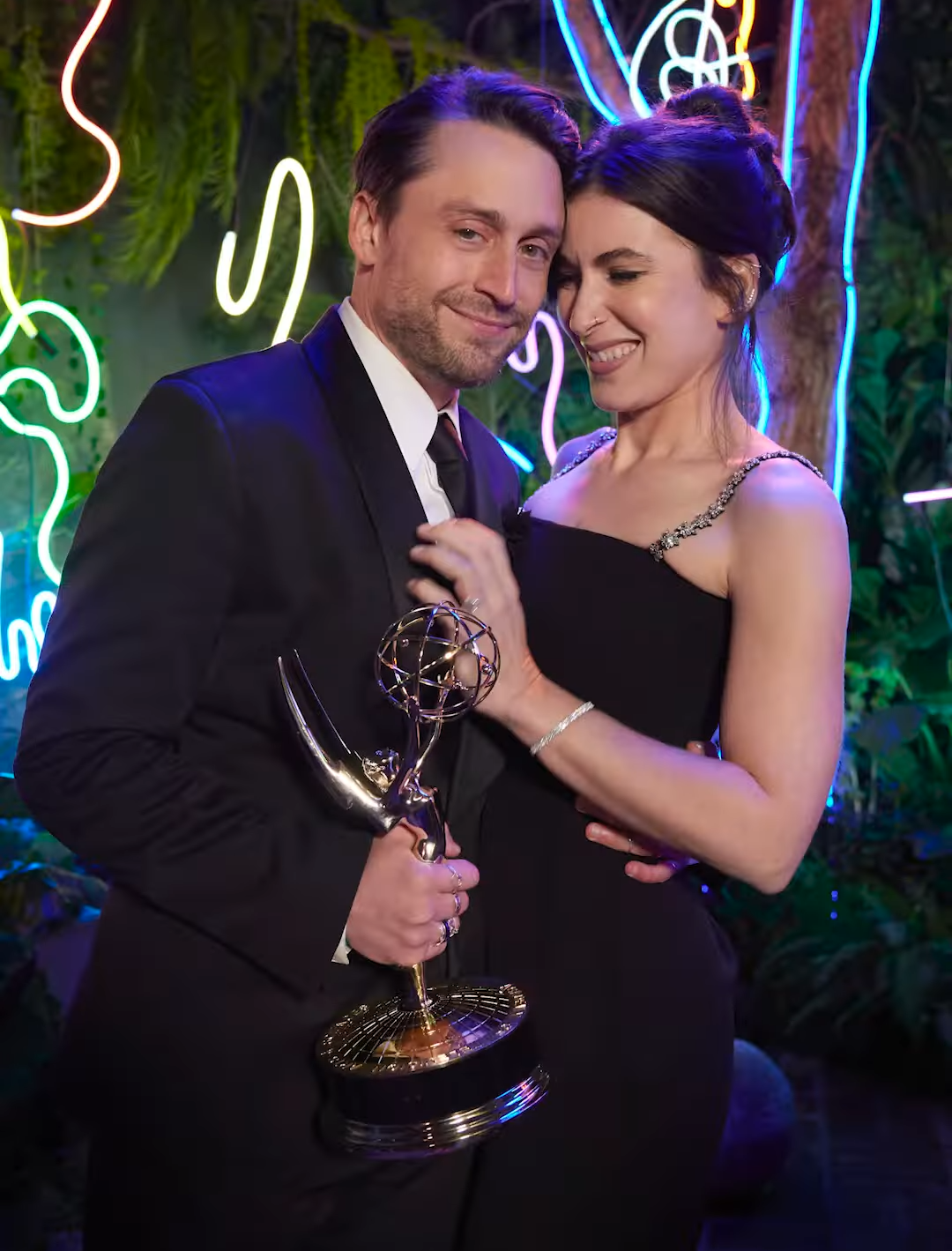
Culkin and his wife, Jazz Charton, at the 75th Primetime Emmy Awards in 2024

In 2005, Culkin briefly dated his After Ashley co-star Anna Paquin. He was in a relationship with his Paper Man co-star Emma Stone from 2009 to 2011. They remained good friends following their split and continued to work together on Movie 43 and A Real Pain. In 2012, Culkin met British advertising specialist Jazz Charton. They eloped on June 22, 2013, during a cross-country road trip in Iowa. The couple have three children together; Culkin's Succession co-star Sarah Snook is the godmother to their second child. The family resides in Greenpoint, Brooklyn.

Some of Culkin's hobbies are cooking, playing retro video games, and watching professional wrestling. His She's All That co-star Freddie Prinze Jr. described him as an "encyclopedia" of the latter. Culkin has attended an estimated ten editions of WrestleMania, the annual flagship event held by WWE. He is also proficient in American Sign Language.

Culkin became friends with singer Michael Jackson around the time Home Alone was released. He frequently visited his residence, Neverland Ranch, with his siblings. During the 2003 television program Living with Michael Jackson, the singer defended his practice of inviting children into his bedroom by telling British journalist Martin Bashir that "many children," including Culkin, had slept in the same bed as him. The program triggered an investigation and Jackson was formally charged with seven counts of child molestation; he was later acquitted in a court of law in 2005. Culkin declined to speak about his relationship with Jackson in the wake of the documentary film Leaving Neverland (2019), due to its sensitive nature.

== Acting credits and awards ==
Among his major competitive awards, Culkin has won an Academy Award, a BAFTA Award, a Primetime Emmy Award, and two Golden Globe Awards. He is the first performer to win the Academy Award for Best Supporting Actor from a film that was not nominated in Best Picture since Christopher Plummer in 2012.

== See also ==
- List of actors with Academy Award nominations
