= Igby Goes Down =

2002 American film by Burr Steers

- Theatrical release poster
- Directed by: Burr Steers
- Written by: Burr Steers
- Produced by: David Rubin; Lisa Tornell; Trish Hofmann
- Starring: Kieran Culkin; Claire Danes; Jeff Goldblum; Amanda Peet; Ryan Phillippe; Bill Pullman; Susan Sarandon
- Cinematography: Wedigo von Schultzendorff
- Edited by: William M. Anderson; Robert Frazen; Padraic McKinley
- Music by: Uwe Fahrenkrog-Petersen
- Production companies: United Artists; Atlantic Streamline
- Distributed by: MGM Distribution Co.
- Release date: September 13, 2002
- Running time: 98 minutes
- Country: United States
- Language: English
- Budget: $9 million
- Box office: $6.9 million

Igby Goes Down is a 2002 American comedy-drama film that follows the life of Igby Slocumb, a rebellious and sardonic teenager who attempts to break free of his familial ties and wealthy, overbearing mother. The film was written and directed by Burr Steers, and stars Kieran Culkin, Claire Danes, Jeff Goldblum, Susan Sarandon, Amanda Peet, Ryan Phillippe, Bill Pullman and Jared Harris. It was given a limited theatrical release through United Artists on September 13, 2002, in the United States, and received generally positive reviews from critics.

Culkin and Sarandon received Golden Globe nominations for their performances.

== Plot ==
Jason "Igby" Slocumb Jr. is a misanthropic 17-year-old boy, rebelling against the oppressive world of his strict East Coast "old money" family. Igby fears that he will eventually suffer a mental breakdown like his schizophrenic father, Jason, who has been committed to an institution. His mother, Mimi, is self-absorbed and distant and tends to drink heavily. Igby mockingly describes his ambitious older brother Ollie as a fascist or a Young Republican who studies "neo-fascism" (economics) at Columbia University.

Igby figures that there must be a better life out there, and he sets out to find it, rebelling against his family at every opportunity. After happily flunking out of several prep schools, he ends up in a brutal military academy where he gets beaten by his classmates. After escaping and spending time in a Chicago hotel courtesy of his mother's credit card, Igby is sent to New York for the summer to stay with his godfather, successful real estate magnate D. H. Banes.

While working construction for D. H., Igby first encounters Rachel, his godfather's Edie Sedgwick-influenced, heroin-addicted trophy mistress. Rather than return to school, he escapes into the bohemian underworld of Manhattan, hiding out with Rachel and her performance artist friend Russel at her studio owned by D. H. Eventually, he and Rachel have sex. After being found at the studio by D. H. and getting beaten up by Rachel for jeopardizing her living arrangements, he hooks up with terminally bored, part-time lover, Sookie, only for her to later leave him for Ollie.

Despite seeming cold and distant, Mimi is not unaffected by her rebellious son. She describes Igby's conception as an act of animosity and therefore believes that it shouldn't be a surprise that his life follows the same course. His name is explained as a family in-joke. As a child, he would blame his toy bear, Digby, for things he had done only he was mispronouncing it as "Igby". To get him to take responsibility for his actions, his family would call him Igby whenever he lied.

Igby is informed by D. H. that his mother Mimi is dying from breast cancer and so he returns to see her. She asks Igby to be present for her death. She has arranged to commit suicide with help from Ollie, who feeds her drug-laden strawberry yogurt before ultimately placing a plastic bag over her head.

Before dying, Mimi makes a final revelation, casually inquiring of Igby, "I take it you know that D. H. is your father?" Igby visits his catatonic father Jason in the hospital before leaving for Los Angeles to finally make a clean break by getting 3,000 miles away from his family.

== Cast ==
- Kieran Culkin as Jason "Igby" Slocumb Jr.
  - Rory Culkin as 10-year-old Igby
- Claire Danes as Sookie Sapperstein
- Jeff Goldblum as D. H. Banes
- Bill Pullman as Jason Slocumb Sr.
- Susan Sarandon as Mimi Slocumb
- Ryan Phillippe as Oliver "Ollie" Slocumb
- Bill Irwin as Lt. Ernest Smith
- Jared Harris as Russel
- Amanda Peet as Rachel, D. H. Banes's mistress
- Celia Weston as Bunny, Mrs. D. H. Banes
- Cynthia Nixon as Mrs. Piggee
- Eric Bogosian as Mr. Nice Guy
- Jim Gaffigan as Hilton manager
- Gore Vidal as Catholic priest
- Gregory Itzin as the eulogist (uncredited)

== Production ==
Igby Goes Down was filmed in locations throughout New York City, including Central Park, Washington Square Park, and SoHo. It is one of the last films to show the Twin Towers of the original World Trade Center.

== Soundtrack ==
Igby Goes Down - Original Motion Picture Soundtrack

Compilation album by Various
- Released: February 25, 2003
- Genres: Alternative rock, Indie rock
- Label: Spun

The soundtrack was released on February 25, 2003, by Spun Records.

CD
No.	Title	Artist	Length
1.	"The Weight"	Travis	5:11
2.	"Not You"	Underwater Circus	4:00
3.	"Don't Panic"	Coldplay	2:17
4.	"Everybody's Stalking"	Badly Drawn Boy	3:39
5.	"Bohemian Like You"	The Dandy Warhols	3:33
6.	"Anyway"	Jelly Planet	4:13
7.	"Frozen Tears"	Somersault	3:50
8.	"Youth Is Wasted on the Young"	Driftland	3:54
9.	"Broken Up a Ding Dong"	The Beta Band	4:46
10.	"Boys Better"	The Dandy Warhols	4:32
11.	"Insanity Is Relative" (Suite)	Uwe Fahrenkrog-Petersen	2:58
12.	"Love and Remembrance" (Suite)	Uwe Fahrenkrog-Petersen	2:46
13.	"Igby Goes Down" (Main Title)	Uwe Fahrenkrog-Petersen	3:55

=== Additional music credits ===
- Kodo – "Ibuki Reconstruction"
- M. Tardieu – "Nocturne"
- Supreme Beings of Leisure – "Golddigger"
- Herman Beeftink – "Flamenco"
- 60 Ft. Dolls – "No. 1 Pure Alcohol"
- Hans Enrlinger – "Esta Noche"
- Liquido – "Narcotic"
- Ramsay Midwood – "Waynesboro"
- Pete Yorn – "Murray"

== Reception ==
Igby Goes Down received positive critical reaction, with a 75% "fresh" rating on Rotten Tomatoes; the consensus states: "In the vein of The Catcher in the Rye, Igby Goes Down is scathingly witty and sharply observant" and a 72/100 on Metacritic. Critics have compared aspects of the story to J. D. Salinger's novel The Catcher in the Rye.

Film critic Roger Ebert gave the film a positive review and a grade of three and a half stars out of four. Stephen Holden selected the film as a New York Times “Critic’s Pick" and credited it with "ruthless emotional honesty", stating, "Not a false note is sounded."

== Home Media ==
Igby Goes Down was released on DVD on Feb 04, 2003.

== See also ==
- Café Society, also involving nepotism and a love triangle with his benefactor's mistress
