= After Ashley =

2004 play written by Gina Gionfriddo

After Ashley is a 2004 play written by Gina Gionfriddo.

== Productions ==
The play was a hit at the 2004 Humana Festival of New American Plays in Louisville, Kentucky where it received its world premiere in March 2004. The play was commissioned by Philadelphia Theatre Company and received staged readings at the 2003 O'Neill Playwrights Conference of the Euguene O'Neill Theatre Center.

It was then produced Off-Broadway at the Vineyard Theatre, from February 11, 2005 to April 3, 2005. The run had been extended "in response to strong audience and critical support." This production was directed by Terry Kinney and starred Kieran Culkin, Anna Paquin, Dana Eskelson, and Grant Shaud. For his performance as Justin, Culkin won an Obie Award in 2005.

=== Regional productions ===
The play was produced by Woolly Mammoth Theatre Company in Washington D.C. in September 2005 to October 2005, directed by Lee Mikeska Gardner.

The play was presented by the Philadelphia Theatre Company (PTC) at the Plays & Players Theatre, Philadelphia, Pennsylvania in February to March 5, 2006, with direction by Pam MacKinnon. The play received a reading at the PTC STAGES series in Fall 2003.

== Plot ==
In 1999, Justin Hammond lives with his mother and father, Ashley and Alden. They endure trials and tribulations of being a dysfunctional family due to Alden's passive-aggressive nature and Justin's desire to want to be able to grow up without having to talk to his mother about topics such as sexual intercourse or drug usage. An argument ensues when Alden informs Ashley that he has hired a homeless man to do some finishing touches on their long postponed yard work. As a result, the homeless man (who is given the name Glen but is not given any stage time) murders Ashley and leaves her body in the basement for Justin to find. Justin immediately makes a call to 911 to inform them of his mother's murder.

Three years later, in 2002, Alden and Justin have been invited to appear on a talk show in Central Florida with TV producer David Gavin to talk about Alden's best selling book, entitled After Ashley. Alden makes certain that everyone knows of the pain he and Justin have endured since losing a wife and mother, but Justin continuously gives unhelpful and insulting answers to all of David's questions, and protests that simply because someone has died, doesn't mean that all their recognition should be directed on only the good qualities of their character, and not only that, but Alden is lying about his wife to make the two of them look good.

That night, Justin sneaks into a bar where he meets Julie, a girl with a gothic image who recognizes him as the "911 Kid". At first, Justin talks about his "love" for Jesus Christ, which he shortly thereafter admits he was only lying to be funny. During this conversation, he attempts to "figure her out" so that she'd be more interested in having sex with him, which as it turns out, is why Julie initiated a conversation at all. So they go to Justin's apartment that night, where Justin makes Julie spend the night sleeping on the armchair.

The following day, Alden comes in and is surprised by Julie's presence, but decides to tell Justin that he has news: David has decided to produce a new show depicting crimes similar to Ashley's murder and unresolved cases, and he has put a demo of an episode on a VHS tape that they plan to screen the next day. To add on to the problem, David shows up shortly after that and announces that he is opening a homeless shelter entitled "Ashley House", which will open on the same evening. Justin, disgusted by this news, employs the help of a sex cult leader named Roderick Lord to help in any way he can to ruin the premiere. With the aid of Roderick, Justin is able to swap the demo episode for a sex tape that Ashley had made with Roderick when she was still alive, only in exchange for his making a sex tape with Julie. The screening happens the next day, beginning with an introduction from David, a statement read by Alden, and finally an excerpt from a poem read by Justin, and as Ashley's sex tape premieres, Justin lashes out at a painting that was created for the premiere by slashing it. Appalled by this, Alden leaves the screening and cuts off Justin financially.

After the exposure, Justin and Julie sit on the edge of a lake and talk about their relationship, or lack thereof. They resolve that in the end, it would be best for them to be together due to some of the hardships that Justin has had to endure and because his need of a female companion whom he wasn't uncomfortable with, their relationship would be an ideal solution. As this conversation is happening, Ashley's ghost is standing behind them, yet, they are both oblivious to her presence, as she looks at their union disapprovingly.

== Characters ==
- Justin Hammond
- Ashley Hammond, Justin's mother, a part-time art-teacher.
- Alden Hammond, Justin's father. He is an education reporter when the play opens, but later becomes an author and a television host.
- David Gavin, television personality and producer.
- Julie Bell, student at the University of Central Florida
- Roderick Lord, sex cult leader
- Dr. Bob (Voice only)

== Awards and nominations ==
The play was a finalist for the Steinberg New Play Award in 2005. The play was one of three nominees for the Outer Critics Circle Award, John Gassner Playwriting Award. The play was nominated for the Lucille Lortel Award, Outstanding Play.
