= A Real Pain =

2024 film by Jesse Eisenberg

- Theatrical release poster
- Directed by: Jesse Eisenberg
- Written by: Jesse Eisenberg
- Produced by: Ewa Puszczyńska; Jennifer Semler; Jesse Eisenberg; Emma Stone; Ali Herting; Dave McCary
- Starring: Jesse Eisenberg; Kieran Culkin; Will Sharpe; Jennifer Grey; Kurt Egyiawan; Liza Sadovy; Daniel Oreskes
- Cinematography: Michał Dymek
- Edited by: Robert Nassau
- Production companies: Topic Studios; Fruit Tree; Rego Park; Extreme Emotions
- Distributed by: Searchlight Pictures
- Release dates: January 20, 2024 (Sundance); November 1, 2024 (United States); November 8, 2024 (Poland)
- Running time: 90 minutes
- Countries: Poland; United States
- Language: English
- Budget: $3 million
- Box office: $24.9 million

A Real Pain is a 2024 comedy-drama film produced, written and directed by Jesse Eisenberg. An international co-production between Poland and the United States, the film stars Eisenberg and Kieran Culkin as mismatched cousins who reunite for a Jewish heritage tour through Poland in honor of their late grandmother, but tensions between them surface amidst the backdrop of their family history. Its supporting cast includes Will Sharpe, Jennifer Grey, Kurt Egyiawan, Liza Sadovy, and Daniel Oreskes.

Principal photography took place primarily in Poland from May to June 2023. A Real Pain premiered at the 2024 Sundance Film Festival, where it won the Waldo Salt Screenwriting Award, and was released theatrically in the United States on November 1, 2024, and in Poland on November 8 by Searchlight Pictures. The film grossed $24.9 million worldwide.

A Real Pain was critically acclaimed and received several accolades, including two nominations at the 97th Academy Awards and 78th British Academy Film Awards, and four at the 82nd Golden Globe Awards; Culkin won the Oscar, BAFTA, SAG, Golden Globe and Critics' Choice for Best Supporting Actor, while Eisenberg won the BAFTA Award for Best Original Screenplay. It was named as one of the top ten films of 2024 by the American Film Institute and the National Board of Review.

== Plot ==
At John F. Kennedy International Airport, Benji Kaplan waits for his once-close cousin, David, to arrive so they can board their flight. Using the funds left by their late grandmother, the Kaplans plan a Jewish heritage tour through Poland in hopes of seeing the home she grew up in and connecting with their family history. Their contrasting personalities spark several arguments: Benji is a free-spirited and outspoken drifter who criticizes David for losing his former passion and spontaneity, while David is a pragmatic and reserved family man who struggles with Benji's unfiltered outbursts and lack of direction in life.

Arriving at Warsaw, David and Benji meet with their tour group members: Mark and Diane, a retired married couple from Shaker Heights, Ohio; Marcia, a recent divorcee from California; and Eloge, a survivor of the Rwandan genocide who converted to Judaism after moving to Winnipeg. The tour is led by James, a mild-mannered, knowledgeable, gentile guide from Yorkshire. On the first day, the tour visits the Monument to the Ghetto Heroes, Grzybów Square, and the Warsaw Uprising Monument. Benji engages the whole group in assisting him in a reenactment of the Warsaw Uprising around the latter sculpture. An embarrassed David stands apart and takes pictures using the members' phones. In the evening, the two of them smoke marijuana on the rooftop of their hotel.

The group travels to Lublin by train on the second day. Benji is unsettled by the incongruity of traveling first class on a Holocaust tour through former Nazi German-occupied Poland. David falls asleep and Benji does not wake him, which results in the cousins missing their stop. After finding their way back, James leads the group through the city's cultural sights, such as the Grodzka Gate and the Old Jewish Cemetery. Benji criticizes James's lack of authenticity during their visit to the cemetery and challenges his focus on facts and statistics. Benji continues to misbehave and make uncomfortable comments during a group dinner later that evening. When he leaves the table, David opens up to the group about the complex nature of their relationship, revealing that the two have drifted apart after Benji attempted suicide by overdosing on sleeping pills six months earlier.

The next day, David and Benji visit Majdanek, a Nazi German concentration and extermination camp, during their last day with the group. They see the gas chamber, the crematorium ovens and a huge pile of the victims' shoes. Deeply affected by what they had just witnessed, the group sits in stunned silence as their van returns to Lublin, with Benji, seated next to David, sobbing. Back at the hotel, the group members bid farewell to each other. James tells Benji that he is the first person on one of his tours to provide him with honest feedback, and thanks him for changing his perspective, although Benji does not seem to remember the outburst. The Kaplans smoke marijuana together on a hotel rooftop on their final night in Poland. Benji confronts David about his changed personality and asks why he never visits him. While David initially responds that he is busy with his wife and son, he eventually breaks down and explains that following Benji's suicide attempt, he is unable to bear the thought of a person with Benji's talent, charm and passion for life killing himself.

In the morning, the cousins travel to their grandmother's former home in Krasnystaw. Benji recalls a moment when she slapped him after he arrived late and intoxicated to dinner, which gave him a sense of clarity and humility. He laments that she was the only person who was able to keep him disciplined. David suggests that they place visitation stones on the home as an act of remembrance, but a neighbor asks them to remove the stones because they are a tripping hazard. The pair flies back to New York and exchanges goodbyes. David invites Benji to his home for dinner and offers to give him a ride, but Benji declines the offer, prompting David to slap him. They immediately reconcile and profess that they care deeply about each other. David returns home to his wife and son, leaving a visitation stone on his doorstep, while Benji returns to his seat at the airport, observing travelers with tears in his eyes.

== Cast ==
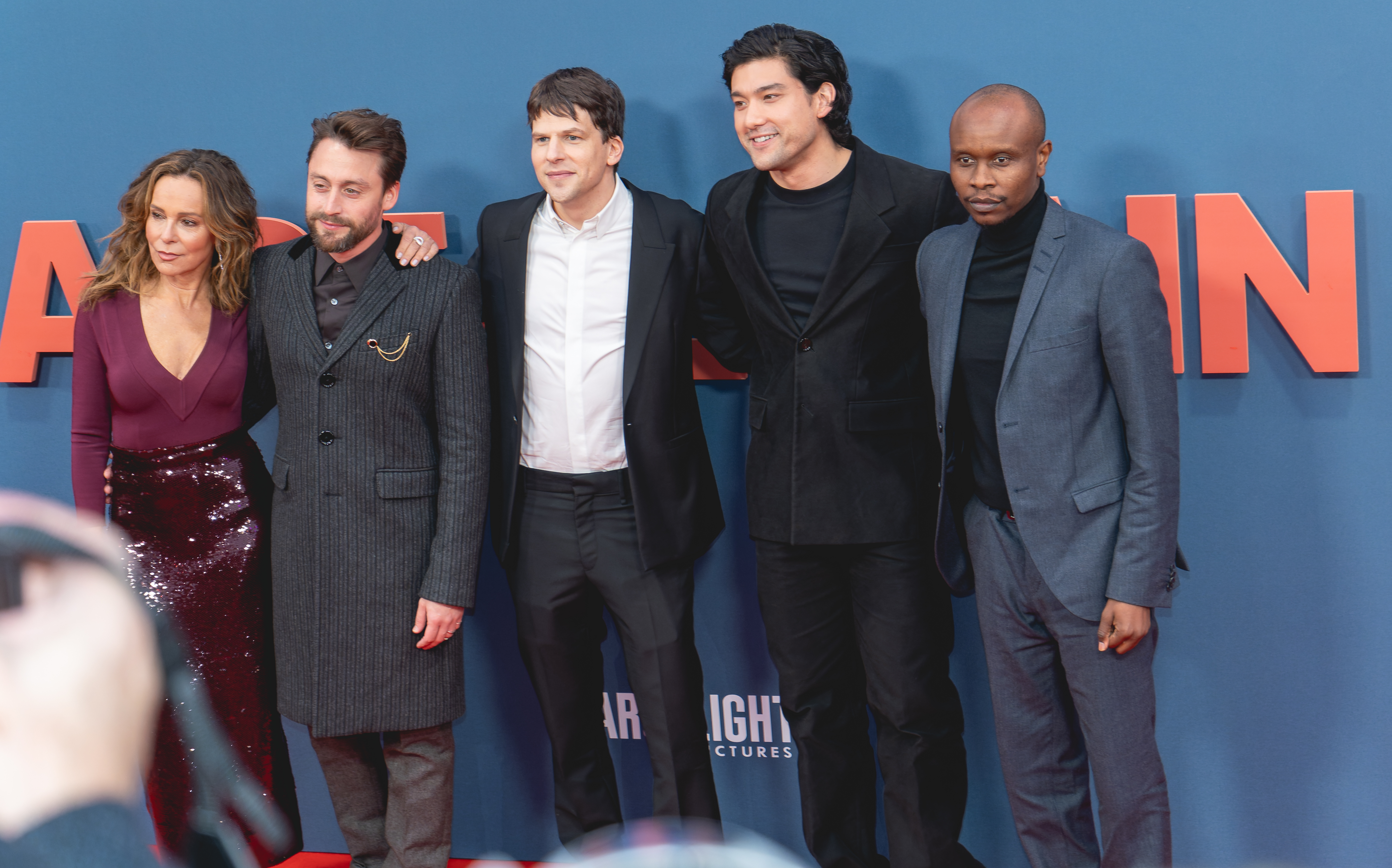
Left to right: Jennifer Grey, Kieran Culkin, Jesse Eisenberg, Will Sharpe, and Kurt Egyiawan

- Jesse Eisenberg as David Kaplan, Benji's neurotic cousin based in New York City
- Kieran Culkin as Benjamin "Benji" Kaplan, David's free-spirited cousin based in Binghamton, New York
- Will Sharpe as James, a tour guide from Yorkshire, England
- Jennifer Grey as Marcia, a recently divorced woman from California
- Kurt Egyiawan as Eloge, a survivor of the Rwandan genocide and Jewish convert living in Winnipeg
- Liza Sadovy as Diane, Mark's wife from Shaker Heights, Ohio
- Daniel Oreskes as Mark, Diane's husband from Shaker Heights, Ohio
- Ellora Torchia as Priya, David's wife

== Production ==
=== Casting ===
In August 2022, it was announced that Jesse Eisenberg would write, direct, and star in A Real Pain opposite Kieran Culkin. Emma Stone, Dave McCary and Ali Herting were set to produce for Fruit Tree.

Eisenberg first offered the role of Benji to Eric André, who turned it down after reading the script and thinking "to go to Poland for six weeks and shoot a movie where we're just babbling about the Holocaust seems like a bummer." Eisenberg was unfamiliar with Culkin's work prior to developing A Real Pain, but decided to then reach out to him based on his essence and his sister's recommendation. He did not send Culkin the first ten pages of the script at first because he thought the role should be given to a Jewish actor; Culkin was raised Catholic. Eisenberg initially wanted to play Benji, as he possesses some of his characteristics, but the producers suggested that he should not take on an "unhinged" performance while directing at the same time. He admitted to Vulture that he had "17,000 thoughts" about casting a non-Jewish actor in a role intended for a Jewish character, "and where I come out is [Culkin] gave me an amazing gift by helping to tell this story that is very personal for my family."

Culkin, on the other hand, was hesitant to jump into another "intense" project so soon after wrapping Succession. He attempted to back out of A Real Pain two weeks before filming began, citing his need to be close to his family as the main reason, but he loved Eisenberg's "beautiful" script and When You Finish Saving the World (2022), Eisenberg's previous directorial effort. Stone convinced him to stay on by pointing out that the entire production would essentially fall apart if he left.

=== Writing ===
Jesse Eisenberg, creator of A Real Pain

In November 2017, Eisenberg wrote a short story titled "Mongolia" for the Jewish online magazine Tablet. The story focused on two college friends—one of whom is grounded, while the other is impulsive—who travel to East Asia in search of the "experience of a lifetime", only to find themselves in a yurt on an ecotourism center. Both of the main characters were taken from two plays that Eisenberg wrote and starred in, respectively: The Revisionist (2013) and The Spoils (2015).

Eisenberg liked the Odd Couple dynamic presented in "Mongolia" and wanted to adapt it for the screen, but struggled to finish the script. As he was ready to scrap the project, an advertisement for a tour of the Auschwitz concentration camp with complimentary lunch appeared on his computer screen. The image both mortified and delighted Eisenberg, as he felt "it sums up everything I think about being a third-generation survivor, which is: There's no good way to experience this. There's no perfect way to honor and revere the history, because anything you do would be in the context of modern privilege."

Eisenberg comes from a secular Jewish background and has Polish ancestry. For twenty years, he has struggled with answering the question of how he could reconcile his "modern daily challenges" with his Ashkenazi ancestors' historical trauma as Holocaust victims and survivors. When he started writing A Real Pain in 2022, which initially began as a thought experiment, Eisenberg sought to place two modern, mismatched cousins struggling with "different degrees of pain," such as anxiety and depression, against the backdrop of the horrors of World War II. The setting allowed him to explore those themes in a "visually explicit" manner and "implicitly" ask questions in a way that did not feel didactic.

=== Filming ===
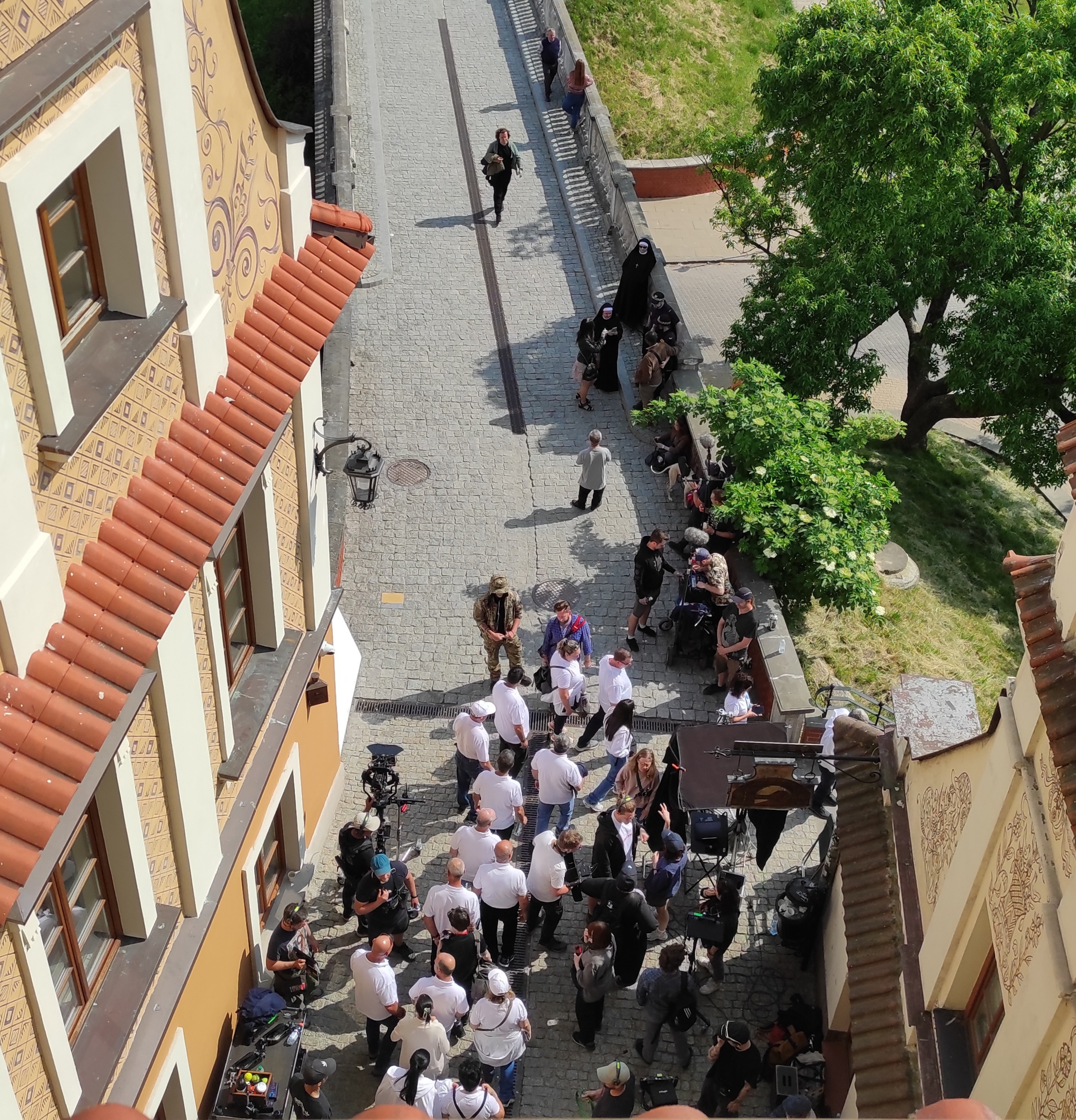
Principal photography in Lublin

Principal photography took place in New York City and various locations across Poland from May to June 2023. Because Eisenberg started writing during the COVID-19 pandemic, he used the street view feature on Google Maps and pictures he took when he traveled to Poland with his wife in 2008 to scout locations and take the tour that the characters were going on. Michał Dymek, the cinematographer, is a native of Warsaw and was raised with historical awareness of the events that occurred in his country. His deep knowledge of his hometown helped Eisenberg film montages that would highlight Poland's beauty:

I wanted the portrayal of Poland in general to feel beautiful and dynamic and colorful and all the things that I feel when I'm there. I feel it's too often depicted as bleak, fetishizing its Eastern European Soviet communist history and fetishizing the horrors of the war. And that's not the Poland I know at all. The Poland I know is vibrant and colorful and warm. So I wanted to show that side of Poland, which is a side that I hadn't seen a lot in American movies, a side that felt just completely true to me.

Dymek's main artistic idea was to work with perspective, as the film features characters who see themselves differently. He wanted to combine their observations by using standard lenses with longer optics, which flattens the perspective to "play with the fact that sometimes the same image can be defined differently by choosing a different focal lens."

=== Music ===
The score for A Real Pain is almost entirely composed of piano pieces written by the Polish virtuoso Frédéric Chopin, and performed by Israeli-Canadian classical pianist Tzvi Erez. Among the featured compositions are Chopin's ballades, études, nocturnes, preludes, and waltzes.

The trailer featured Spoon's "The Way We Get By" and was nominated for Best Sync Usage at the 2025 Libera Awards.

== Release ==
A Real Pain premiered in the U.S. Dramatic Competition at the Sundance Film Festival on January 20, 2024. It screened at the American Film Institute Festival, the BFI London Film Festival, the Haifa International Film Festival, the Heartland International Film Festival, the La Roche-sur-Yon International Film Festival, the Mar del Plata International Film Festival, the New Orleans Film Festival, the Newport Beach Film Festival, the New York Film Festival, the Telluride Film Festival, and the Valladolid International Film Festival.

Shortly after its Sundance premiere, Searchlight Pictures acquired worldwide rights to the film for $10 million in an all-night auction. It received a limited theatrical release on November 1, 2024, and began a wide release on November 15. The film was previously scheduled to be released on October 18, but was subsequently pushed by two weeks. A Real Pain premiered in Poland at the POLIN Museum of the History of Polish Jews as the opening film of the Warsaw Jewish Film Festival. It was then distributed to theaters in the country on November 8, 2024. The film was released in the United Kingdom and Ireland on January 8, 2025. It was previously scheduled to be released on January 10, but was pushed up by two days.

=== Home media ===
A Real Pain was released to digital platforms on December 31, 2024, and became available for streaming on Hulu in the U.S. on January 16, 2025. It was released by Sony Pictures Home Entertainment on Blu-ray on February 4.

== Reception and legacy ==
=== Critical response ===
At its premiere at the Sundance Film Festival, A Real Pain earned rave reviews. Christian Blauvelt, the digital director of IndieWire, surveyed 166 journalists who attended the festival to determine the best competition titles of the season. A Real Pain dominated every eligible category to a degree "almost no film" had towered in the past six years; close exceptions were Celine Song's Past Lives and Chloe Domont's Fair Play (both 2023). On the review aggregator website Rotten Tomatoes, 96% of 269 critics' reviews are positive, with an average rating of 8.3/10. The website's consensus reads: "Led by a scene-stealing turn from Kieran Culkin, A Real Pain is a powerfully funny, emotionally resonant dramedy that finds writer-director-star Jesse Eisenberg playing to his strengths on either side of the camera." Metacritic, which uses a weighted average, assigned the film a score of 85 out of 100, based on 55 critics, indicating "universal acclaim".

The Hollywood Reporter's David Rooney described A Real Pain as "funny, heartfelt, and moving in equal measure." He praised Eisenberg's "impeccable" judgment and great skill at "balancing sardonic wit with piercing solemnity in a movie full of feeling, in which no emotion is unearned." Owen Gleiberman for Variety welcomed Eisenberg into a "hallowed company" of actors who turned out to be born filmmakers, such as Greta Gerwig, Ben Affleck and Bradley Cooper. To Ed Potton of The Sunday Times, the story was "perfectly weighted between bleak and warm, poignant and irreverent." Bill Goodykontz, in a review for The Arizona Republic, thought Eisenberg pulled off a magic trick by making a film with "backdrops of pain and despair, both personal and existential, that is also funny, charming and something approaching uplifting." For IndieWire's annual critics poll, of which 177 critics and journalists from around the world voted, Eisenberg's work placed second on the Best Screenplay list, behind Sean Baker's script for Anora.

Culkin's performance was highly acclaimed. Ty Burr for The Washington Post wrote that he "walks a line between obnoxiousness and delight; it’s a performance both liberating and touched by a deeper, more inarticulate sadness." Manohla Dargis, writing for The New York Times, thought Culkin was "shockingly great" and articulated Benji's inner turmoil through a "transparently readable, sometimes viscerally destabilizing" manner. Dargis later ranked A Real Pain third on her list of the best movies of 2024. Mick LaSalle of the San Francisco Chronicle lauded his "dominating", tour de force performance, writing that Eisenberg invented a new film genre called "the Kieran Culkin movie." Film journalists from Collider, The Hollywood Reporter, Rolling Stone, Time, Vulture, and TheWrap declared Culkin's performance one of the finest of the year. Filmmakers Lena Dunham, Tim Fehlbaum and William Goldenberg praised the film.

=== Accolades ===
A Real Pain won the Waldo Salt Screenwriting Award at the 2024 Sundance Film Festival. The American Film Institute and the National Board of Review named it one of the top ten best films of 2024. At the 97th Academy Awards, Culkin won Best Supporting Actor while Eisenberg was nominated for Best Original Screenplay. Culkin is the first actor since Christopher Plummer (for 2010's Beginners) to win in the former category from a film that was not nominated for Best Picture.

A Real Pain won both of its nominations at the 78th British Academy Film Awards and the 40th Independent Spirit Awards, honoring Eisenberg's script and Culkin's performance. It also won two of its three nominations at the 30th Critics' Choice Awards: Best Comedy and Best Supporting Actor. The film also received four nominations at the 82nd Golden Globe Awards, including Best Motion Picture – Musical or Comedy, and won Best Supporting Actor – Motion Picture for Culkin. Eisenberg won Best Original Screenplay at the 29th Satellite Awards, while Culkin earned a nomination at the 34th Gotham Awards.

=== Legacy ===
In March 2025, Eisenberg was granted Polish citizenship by President Andrzej Duda, following the success of the film. Eisenberg described the citizenship as "an honor of a lifetime and something I have been very interested in for two decades."
