= Sam Davis (filmmaker) =

American filmmaker and cinematographer

- Other name: Sam A. Davis
- Education: University of Southern California
- Occupations: Filmmaker; cinematographer; film producer

Sam Davis (also credited as Sam A. Davis) is an American filmmaker, cinematographer and film producer. He is known for directing the short film The Singers, for which he received an Academy Award for Best Live Action Short Film, and for producing the Academy Award-nominated documentary short Nǎi Nai & Wài Pó and the Academy Award-winning short documentary Period. End of Sentence.

== Early life and career ==
Davis grew up in a small town in Michigan, where his father worked as a high school football coach. He developed an interest in filmmaking after gaining access to the school's video camera, which was used to record football games. He began making short films with friends while in high school before moving to Los Angeles to pursue a career in filmmaking.

He studied at the University of Southern California film school, where he focused on cinematography and met filmmaker Sean Wang, with whom he developed a friendship and creative collaboration.

== Career ==
Davis has worked across directing, cinematography, producing and editing, drawing on his background in documentary filmmaking. In 2019, he produced, edited and shot Period. End of Sentence., which won the Academy Award for Best Documentary Short Film.

In 2022, Davis was a producer, cinematographer and editor on SXSW winning The New York Times Op-Docs Long Line of Ladies, a documentary short directed by Shaandiin Tome and Rayka Zehtabchi. In 2023, he was nominated for Outstanding Cinematography: Documentary at the 44th News & Documentary Emmy Awards for his work on the film.

In 2024, Davis was a produced and cinematographer of Disney+ Nǎi Nai & Wài Pó, directed by Sean Wang. The documentary short received an Academy Award nomination for Best Documentary Short Film. In the same year, he was a cinematographer on Sean Wang's coming-of-age feature film Dìdi, which won Audience Award at Sundance Film Festival and sold to Focus Features.

In 2025, Davis directed The Singers, a short film adapted from a 19th-century story by Russian writer Ivan Turgenev. The film follows a group of downtrodden patrons in a remote bar who unexpectedly connect through an impromptu singing competition. Davis made The Singers without a conventional script or shot list, allowing the non-actors to improvise their dialogues. Drawing on his documentary background, he kept the filming spontaneous and minimal. Netflix released the film globally on February, 2026 and it won an Academy Award for Best Live Action Short Film on March, 2026.

== Personal life ==
Davis is the brother of sportscaster Joe Davis, the lead play-by-play announcer for the Los Angeles Dodgers and Fox Sports, and author Katheryn Davis.
