= Washington D.C. Area Film Critics Association Award for Best Breakthrough Performance =

Annual US film award

The Washington D.C. Area Film Critics Association Award for Best Breakthrough Performance or Best Youth Performance is one of the annual awards given by the Washington D.C. Area Film Critics Association.

== Winners ==
=== 2000s ===
Year	Performer	Film	Role
2005	Terrence Howard	Hustle & Flow	DJay
2005	Amy Adams	Junebug	Ashley Johnsten
2005	Q’orianka Kilcher	The New World	Pocahontas (Matoaka, Rebecca Rolfe)
2005	Taryn Manning	Hustle & Flow	Nola
2005	Aishwarya Rai	Bride and Prejudice	Lalita Bakshi
2006	Jennifer Hudson	Dreamgirls	Effie White
2007	Elliot Page (Note: Credited as Ellen Page)	Juno	Juno MacGuff
2008	Dev Patel	Slumdog Millionaire	Jamal Malik
2009	Gabourey Sidibe	Precious	Claireece "Precious" Jones
2009	Anna Kendrick	Up in the Air	Natalie Keener
2009	Christian McKay	Me and Orson Welles	Orson Welles
2009	Carey Mulligan	An Education	Jenny Mellor
2009	Jeremy Renner	The Hurt Locker	Sergeant First Class William James

=== 2010s ===
Year	Performer	Film	Role
2010	No award		
2011	No award		
2012	Quvenzhané Wallis	Beasts of the Southern Wild	Hushpuppy
2012	Jared Gilman	Moonrise Kingdom	Sam Shakusky
2012	Kara Hayward	Moonrise Kingdom	Suzy Bishop
2012	Tom Holland	The Impossible	Lucas
2012	Logan Lerman	The Perks of Being a Wallflower	Charlie Kelmeckis
2013	Tye Sheridan	Mud	Ellis
2013	Asa Butterfield	Ender’s Game	Ender Wiggin
2013	Adèle Exarchopoulos	Blue Is the Warmest Colour	Adèle
2013	Liam James	The Way Way Back	Duncan
2013	Waad Mohammed	Wadjda	Wadjda
2014	Ellar Coltrane	Boyhood	Mason Evans, Jr.
2014	Mackenzie Foy	Interstellar	Murph
2014	Jaeden Lieberher	St. Vincent	Oliver Bronstein
2014	Tony Revolori	The Grand Budapest Hotel	Zero Moustafa
2014	Noah Wiseman	The Babadook	Samuel Vanek
2015	Jacob Tremblay	Room	Jack Newsome
2015	Abraham Attah	Beasts of No Nation	Agu
2015	Raffey Cassidy	Tomorrowland	Athena
2015	Oona Laurence	Southpaw	Leila Hope
2016	Lucas Hedges	Manchester by the Sea	Patrick Chandler
2016	Lewis MacDougall	A Monster Calls	Conor O'Malley
2016	Sunny Pawar	Lion	Saroo Brierley
2016	Hailee Steinfeld	The Edge of Seventeen	Nadine Franklin
2016	Anya Taylor-Joy	The Witch	Thomasin
2017	Brooklynn Prince	The Florida Project	Moonee
2017	Dafne Keen	Logan	Laura / X23
2017	Sophia Lillis	It	Beverly "Bev" Marsh
2017	Millicent Simmonds	Wonderstruck	Rose Mayhew
2017	Jacob Tremblay	Wonder	August "Auggie" Pullman
2018	Elsie Fisher	Eighth Grade	Kayla Day
2018	Thomasin Harcourt McKenzie	Leave No Trace	Tom
2018	Milly Shapiro	Hereditary	Charlie Graham
2018	Millicent Simmonds	A Quiet Place	Regan Abbott
2018	Amandla Stenberg	The Hate U Give	Starr Carter
2019	Roman Griffin Davis	Jojo Rabbit	Jojo Betzler
2019	Julia Butters	Once Upon a Time in Hollywood	Trudi Frazer
2019	Shahadi Wright Joseph	Us	Zora Wilson
2019	Noah Jupe	Honey Boy	Otis Lort
2019	Thomasin McKenzie	Jojo Rabbit	Elsa Korr

=== 2020s ===
Year	Performer	Film	Role
2020	Alan Kim	Minari	David Yi
2020	Millie Bobby Brown	Enola Holmes	Enola Holmes
2020	Sidney Flanigan	Never Rarely Sometimes Always	Autumn Callaghan
2020	Talia Ryder	Never Rarely Sometimes Always	Skylar
2020	Helena Zengel	News of the World	Johanna Leonberger
2021	Woody Norman	C'mon C'mon	Jesse
2021	Jude Hill	Belfast	Buddy
2021	Emilia Jones	CODA	Ruby Rossi
2021	Saniyya Sidney	King Richard	Venus Williams
2021	Rachel Zegler	West Side Story	María
2022	Gabriel LaBelle	The Fabelmans	Sammy Fabelman
2022	Frankie Corio	Aftersun	Sophie Patterson
2022	Jalyn Hall	Till	Emmett Till
2022	Banks Repeta	Armageddon Time	Paul Graff
2022	Sadie Sink	The Whale	Ellie
2023	Dominic Sessa	The Holdovers	Angus Tully
2023	Joe Bird	Talk To Me	Riley
2023	Abby Ryder Fortson	Are You There God? It’s Me, Margaret	Margaret Simon
2023	Milo Machado Graner	Anatomy of a Fall	Daniel Maleski
2023	Ariana Greenblatt	Barbie	Sasha
2023	Iman Vellani	The Marvels	Kamala Khan / Ms. Marvel
2024	Elliott Heffernan	Blitz	George
2024	Alisha Weir	Abigail	Abigail
2024	Alyla Browne	Furiosa: A Mad Max Saga	Young Furiosa
2024	Ian Foreman	Exhibiting Forgiveness	Young Tarrell
2024	Isabel DeRoy–Olson	Fancy Dance	Roki
2024	Izaac Wang	Didi	Chris "Dìdi" Wang
2024	Zoe Ziegler	Janet Planet	Lacy
2025	Miles Caton	Sinners	Sammie Moore
2025	Cary Christopher	Weapons	
2025	Shannon Mahina Gorman	Rental Family	
2025	Jacobi Jupe	Hamnet	
2025	Mason Thames	How to Train Your Dragon	
2025	Nina Ye	Left-Handed Girl	
