= San Diego Film Critics Society Awards 2024 =

29th San Diego Film Critics Society Awards

29th San Diego Film Critics Society Awards
- Date: December 9, 2024
- Site: San Diego, California, U.S.

Highlights
- Best Picture: Sing Sing
- Most awards: Sing Sing; Wicked (3)
- Most nominations: Dune: Part Two (12)

The 29th San Diego Film Critics Society Awards were announced on December 9, 2024.

The nominations were announced on December 6, 2024, with the epic science fiction film Dune: Part Two leading the nominations with twelve, followed by Conclave and Wicked with nine each. Sing Sing and Wicked won the most awards with three wins each, with the former winning Best Picture.

== Winners and nominees ==
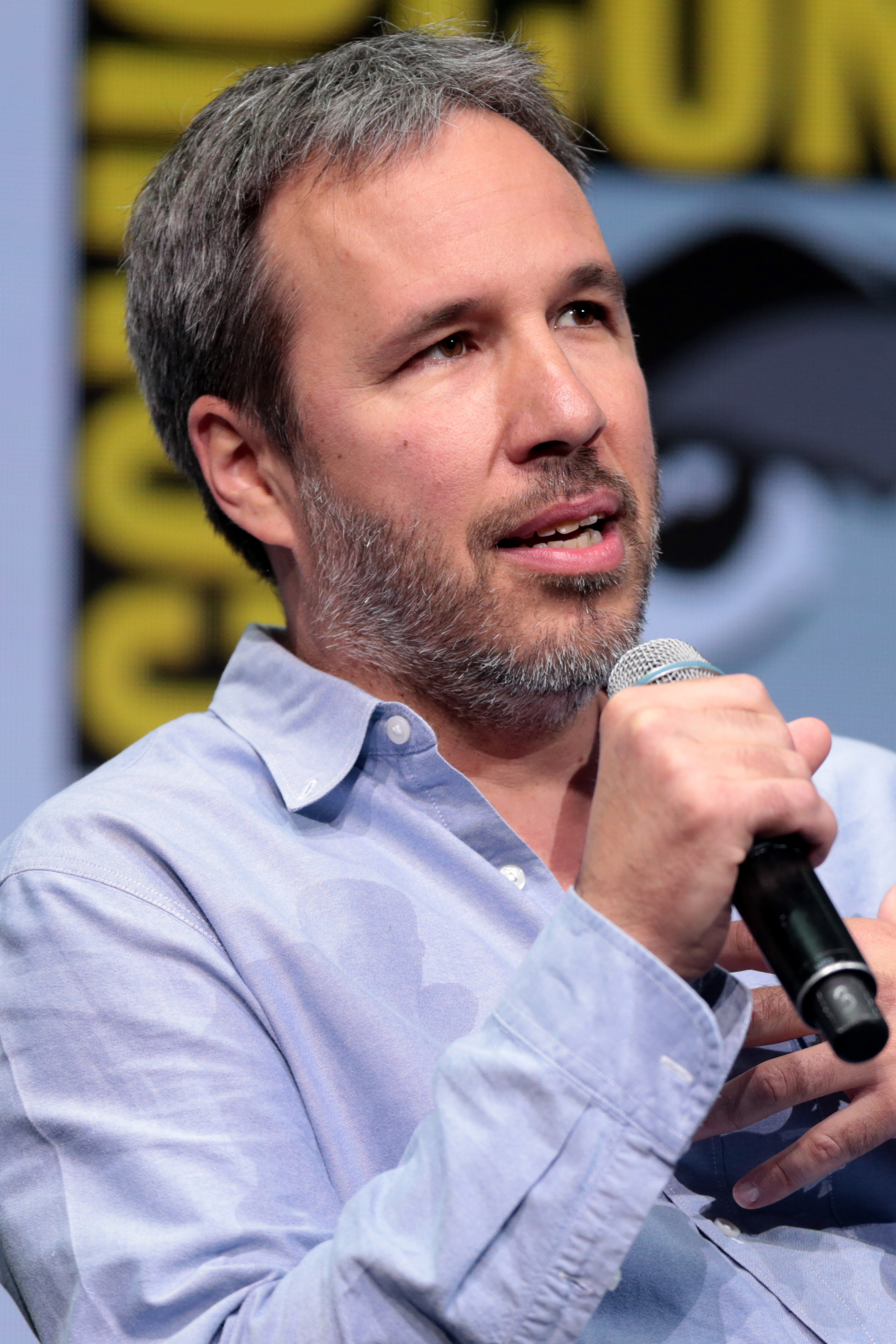
Denis Villeneuve, Best Director winner

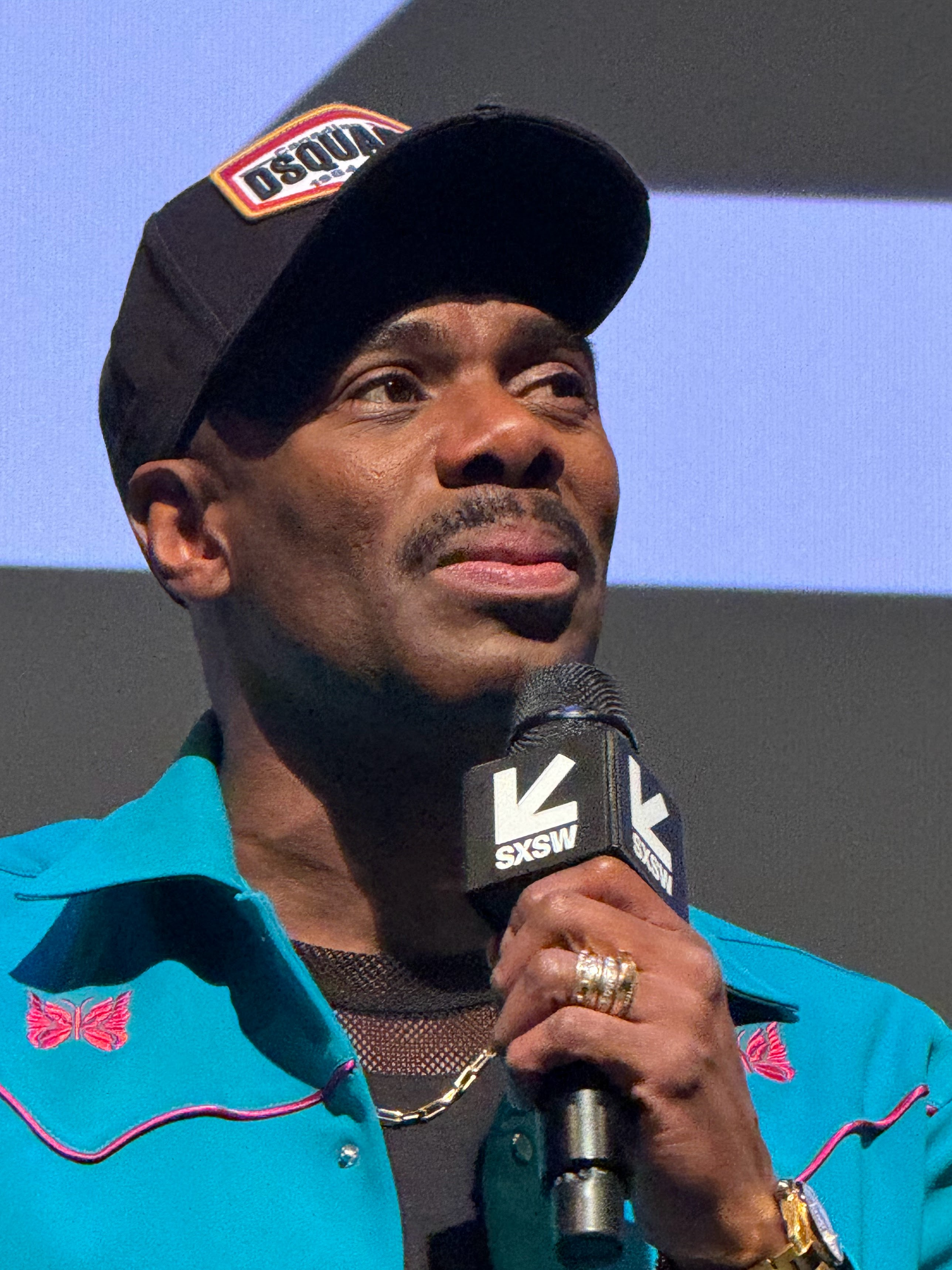
Colman Domingo, Best Actor winner

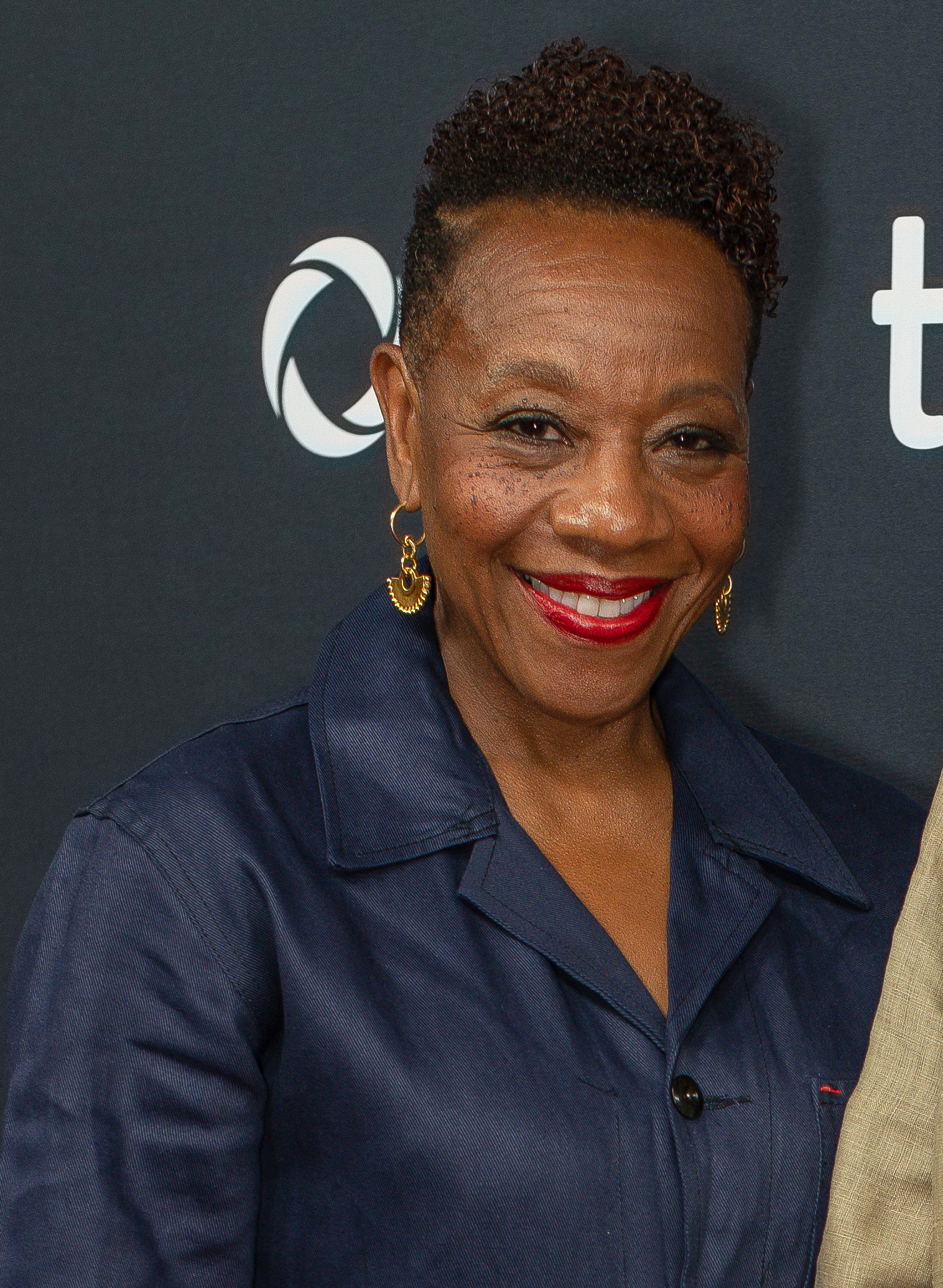
Marianne Jean-Baptiste, Best Actress winner

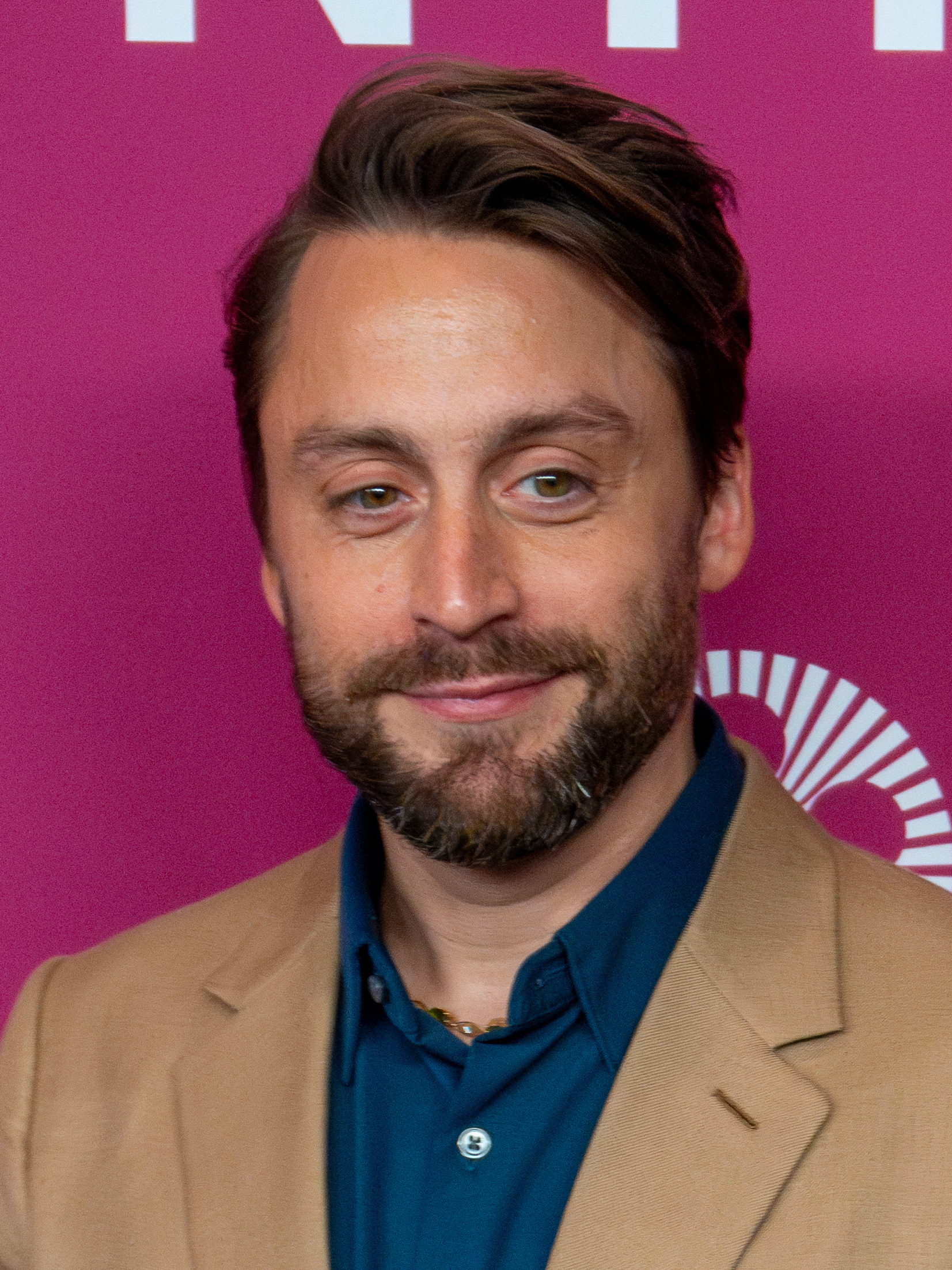
Kieran Culkin, Best Supporting Actor winner

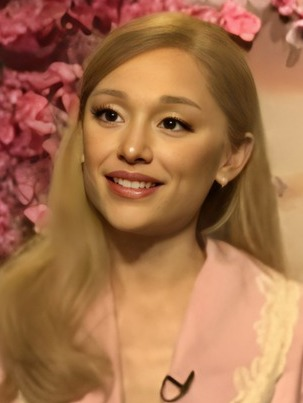
Ariana Grande, Best Supporting Actress winner

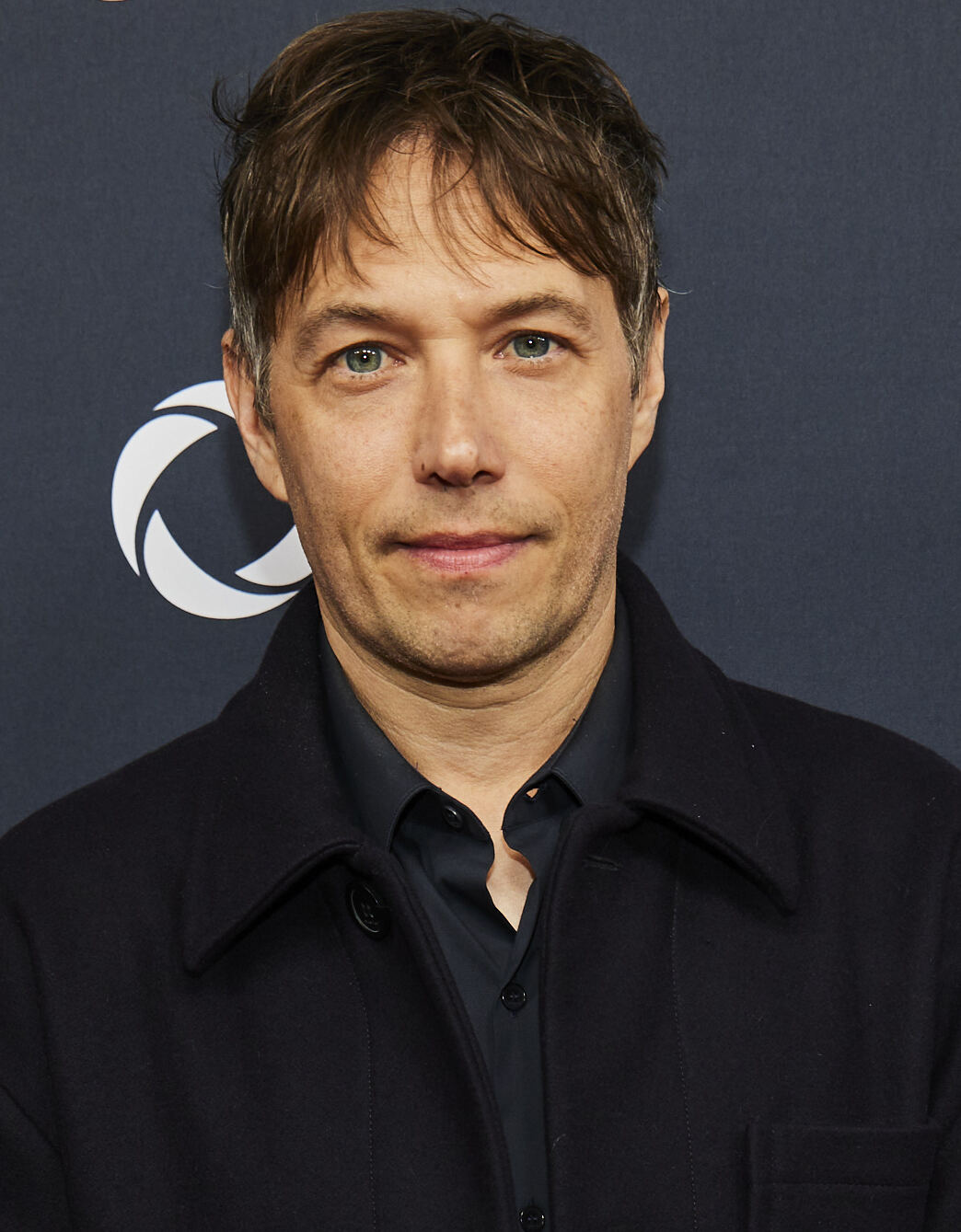
Sean Baker, Best Original Screenplay winner

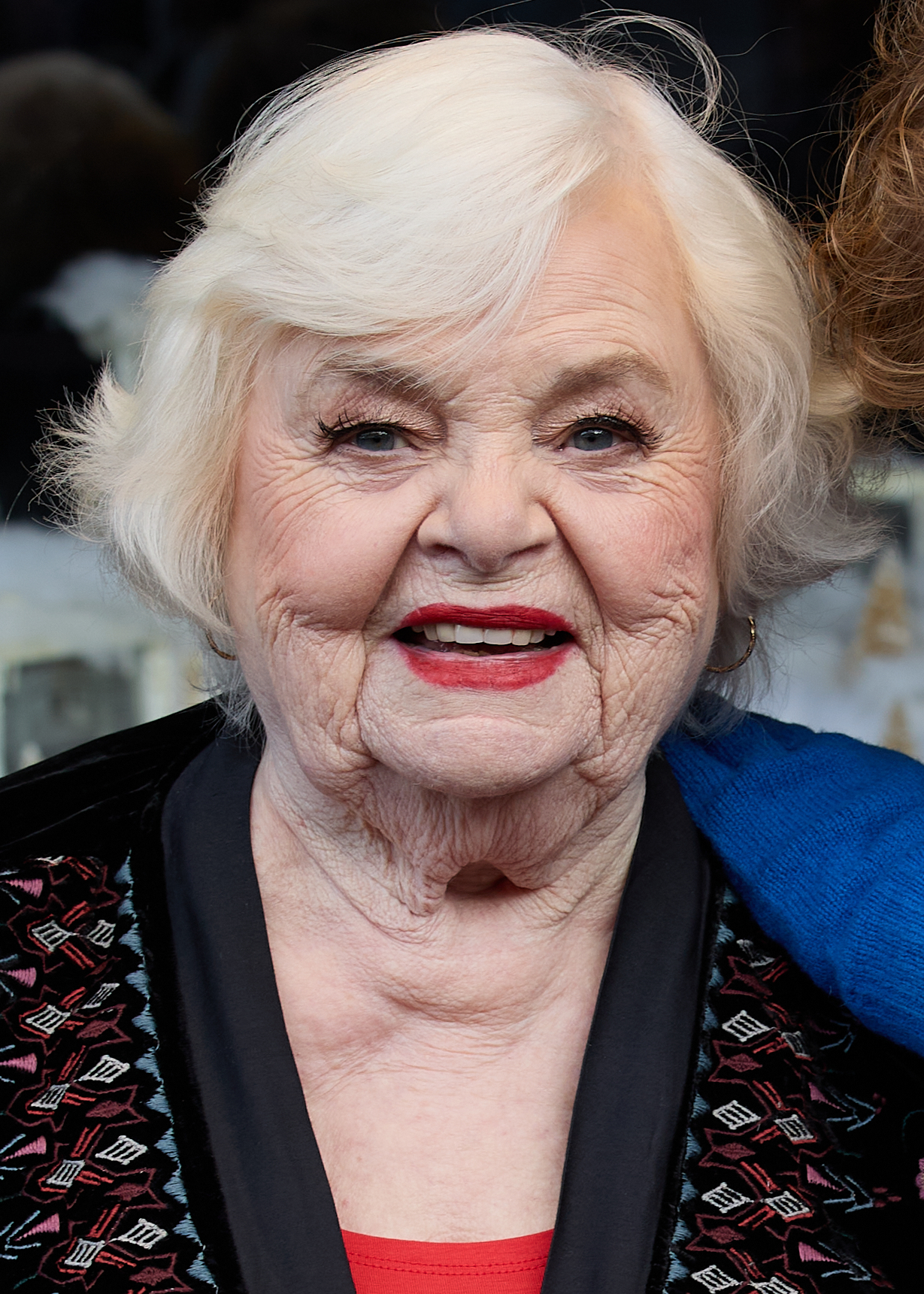
June Squibb, Best Comedic Performance winner

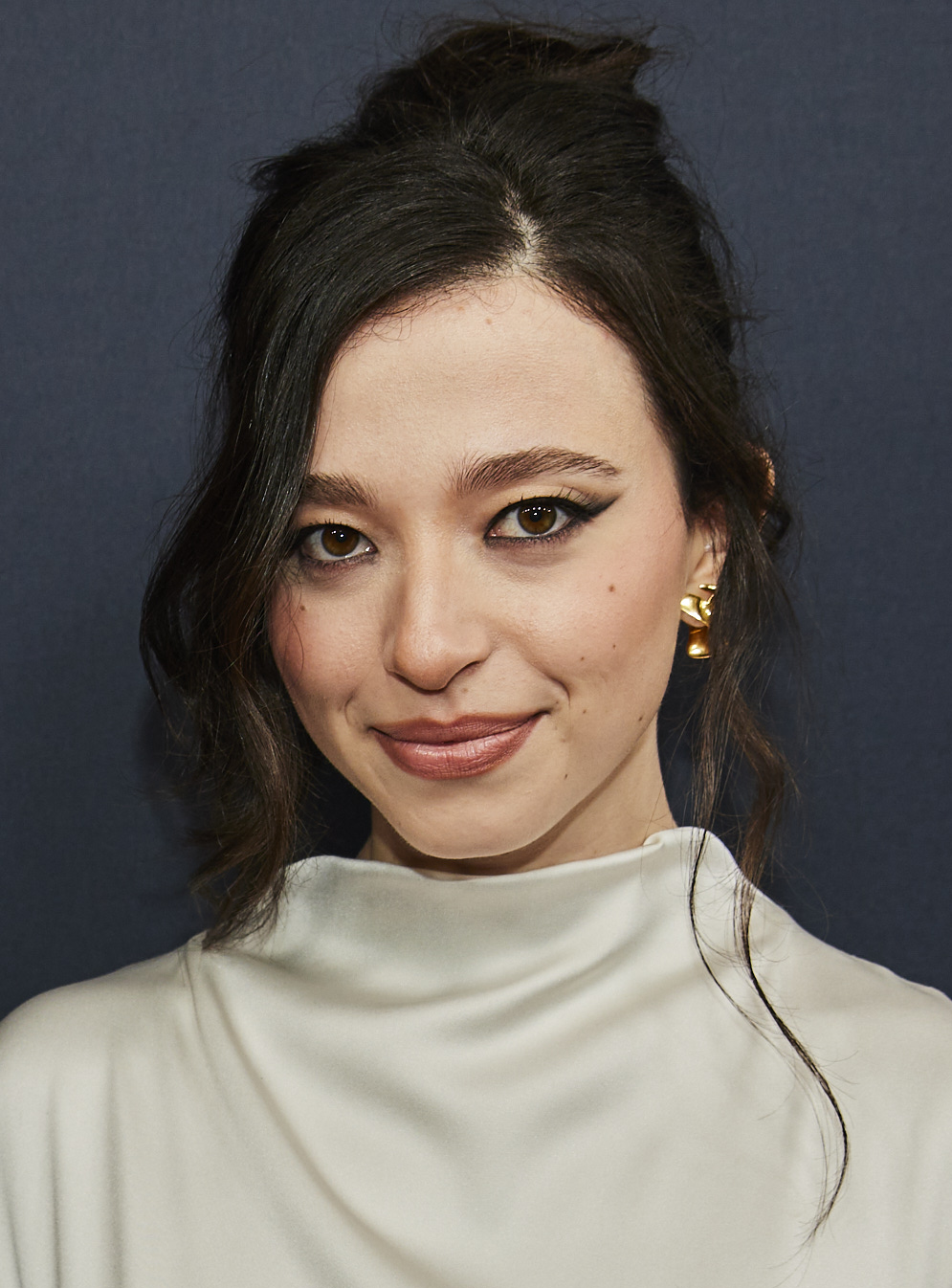
Mikey Madison, Breakthrough Actor winner

Winners are listed at the top of each list in bold, while the runner-ups and nominees for each category are listed under them.

| Best Picture | Best Director |
|---|---|
| **Sing Sing**; Runner-up: Anora; Runner-up: Conclave; Challengers; Dune: Part Two | **Denis Villeneuve – Dune: Part Two**; Runner-up: Greg Kwedar – Sing Sing; Edward Berger – Conclave; Brady Corbet – The Brutalist; Coralie Fargeat – The Substance |
| Best Actor | Best Actress |
| **Colman Domingo – Sing Sing as John "Divine G" Whitfield**; Runner-up: Adrien Brody – The Brutalist as László Tóth; Runner-up: Daniel Craig – Queer as William Lee; Timothée Chalamet – A Complete Unknown as Bob Dylan; Ralph Fiennes – Conclave as Cardinal Thomas Lawrence | **Marianne Jean-Baptiste – Hard Truths as Pansy Deacon**; Runner-up: Amy Adams – Nightbitch as Mother; Cynthia Erivo – Wicked as Elphaba Thropp; Mikey Madison – Anora as Anora "Ani" Mikheeva; Demi Moore – The Substance as Elisabeth Sparkle |
| Best Supporting Actor | Best Supporting Actress |
| **Kieran Culkin – A Real Pain as Benji Kaplan**; Runner-up: Denzel Washington – Gladiator II as Macrinus; Clarence Maclin – Sing Sing as Clarence "Divine Eye" Maclin; Guy Pearce – The Brutalist as Harrison Lee Van Buren Sr.; Stanley Tucci – Conclave as Cardinal Aldo Bellini | **Ariana Grande – Wicked as Galinda "Glinda" Upland**; Runner-up: Joan Chen – Dìdi as Chungsing Wang; Jessie Buckley – Wicked Little Letters as Rose Gooding; Danielle Deadwyler – The Piano Lesson as Berniece; Natasha Lyonne – His Three Daughters as Rachel |
| Best Adapted Screenplay | Best Original Screenplay |
| **Clint Bentley and Greg Kwedar – Sing Sing**; Runner-up: Denis Villeneuve and Jon Spaihts – Dune: Part Two; Chris Sanders – The Wild Robot; Peter Straughan – Conclave; Malcolm Washington and Virgil Williams – The Piano Lesson | **Sean Baker – Anora**; Runner-up: Justin Kuritzkes – Challengers; Jesse Eisenberg – A Real Pain; Coralie Fargeat – The Substance; Rose Glass and Weronika Tofilska – Love Lies Bleeding |
| Best Ensemble | Best Comedic Performance |
| **September 5**; Runner-up: Conclave; Dune: Part Two; Sing Sing; Wicked | **June Squibb – Thelma as Thelma Post**; Runner-up: Michael Keaton – Beetlejuice Beetlejuice as Betelgeuse; Ryan Gosling – The Fall Guy as Colt Seavers; Aubrey Plaza – My Old Ass as Older Elliott; Channing Tatum – Deadpool & Wolverine as Gambit |
| Best Animated Film | Best Documentary |
| **Flow**; Runner-up: The Wild Robot; Memoir of a Snail; Transformers One; Wallace & Gromit: Vengeance Most Fowl | **Super/Man: The Christopher Reeve Story**; Runner-up: Daughters; Music by John Williams; Sugarcane; Will & Harper |
| Best Foreign Language Film | Best First Feature (Director) |
| **All We Imagine as Light**; The Girl with the Needle; No Other Land; The Seed of the Sacred Fig; Vermiglio | **Zoë Kravitz – Blink Twice**; Runner-up: Sean Wang – Dìdi; Anna Kendrick – Woman of the Hour; Rachel Morrison – The Fire Inside; Dev Patel – Monkey Man |
| Best Cinematography | Best Editing |
| **Nosferatu – Jarin Blaschke**; Runner-up: Conclave – Stéphane Fontaine; Dune: Part Two – Greig Fraser; Sing Sing – Pat Scola; Wicked – Alice Brooks | **September 5 – Hansjörg Weißbrich**; Runner-up: Challengers – Marco Costa; Anora – Sean Baker; Blink Twice – Kathryn J. Schubert; Dune: Part Two – Joe Walker |
| Best Costume Design | Best Production Design |
| **Wicked – Paul Tazewell**; Runner-up: The Last Showgirl – Jacqueline Getty and Rainy Jacobs; Beetlejuice Beetlejuice – Colleen Atwood; Conclave – Lisy Christl; Dune: Part Two – Jacqueline West | **Wicked – Nathan Crowley**; Runner-up: Nosferatu – Craig Lathrop and Beatrice Brentnerová; Runner-up: Dune: Part Two – Patrice Vermette; The Brutalist – Judy Becker; Conclave – Suzie Davies |
| Best Use of Music | Best Stunt Choreography |
| **A Complete Unknown**; Runner-up: Challengers; Dune: Part Two; Sing Sing; Wicked | **The Fall Guy**; Runner-up: Monkey Man; Alien: Romulus; Dune: Part Two; Gladiator II |
| Best Sound Design | Best Visual Effects |
| **Dune: Part Two**; Runner-up: Civil War; A Quiet Place: Day One; Alien: Romulus; Wicked | **The Substance**; Runner-up: Dune: Part Two; Runner-up: Kingdom of the Planet of the Apes; Alien: Romulus; Nosferatu |
| Best Youth Performance (For a performer under the age of 18) | Breakthrough Actor |
| **Izaac Wang – Dìdi as Chris "Dìdi" Wang**; Runner-up: Alix West Lefler – Speak No Evil as Agnes Dalton; Elliott Heffernan – Blitz as George; Katherine Mallen Kupferer – Ghostlight as Daisy Mueller; Alisha Weir – Abigail as Abigail | **Mikey Madison – Anora as Anora "Ani" Mikheeva**; Runner-up: Nell Tiger Free – The First Omen as Margaret |
Special Award for Body of Work
**Nicholas Hoult (Juror #2, Nosferatu, The Order, and The Garfield Movie)**
