= Izaac Wang =

American actor

- Born: October 22, 2007 (age 18); Minnesota, U.S.
- Occupation: Actor
- Years active: 2019–present
- Notable work: Good Boys; Raya and the Last Dragon; Dìdi; Win or Lose

Izaac Wang (born October 22, 2007) is an American actor best known for his performances in Good Boys (2019), Raya and the Last Dragon (2021), Dìdi (2024), and Win or Lose (2025).

== Early and personal life ==
Wang was born to a Chinese father and Laotian mother in Minnesota, where he lived for three years before moving to Los Angeles. Wang attends the Los Angeles County High School for the Arts, a performing arts high school, as of July 2024.

== Career ==
After appearing in the TV Land series Teachers, Wang landed his first film role as Soren in the 2019 Universal Pictures film Good Boys. In June 2019, he was cast as Owen Yu in the Paramount Pictures film Clifford the Big Red Dog. In June 2020, he appeared in the Lionsgate film Think Like a Dog. In March 2021, he gained notability when he portrayed Boun in the Walt Disney Pictures animated film Raya and the Last Dragon (2021). In February 2021, Wang was cast as Sam Wing in the HBO Max streaming series Gremlins: Secrets of the Mogwai (2023).

In 2024, Wang starred in his first leading feature film role as Chris Wang in Sean Wang's directorial debut Dìdi (2024). For his performance, he received a nomination for the Breakthrough Performer Award at the 2024 Gotham Awards. Wang voiced the character Yuwen in the 2025 Pixar animated miniseries Win or Lose. In July 2025, he appeared in a commercial for Cash App.

== Filmography ==
=== Film ===
Year	Title	Role	Notes	Ref.
2019	Good Boys	Soren		
2020	Think Like a Dog	Li		
2021	Raya and the Last Dragon	Boun (voice)		
2021	Clifford the Big Red Dog	Owen Yu		
2022	White Now Please	Bryan Chen	Short film	
2024	Dìdi	Chris "Dìdi" Wang		

=== Television ===
Year	Title	Role	Notes	Ref.
2019	Teachers	Caleb	Episode: "Face Your Peers"	
2021	Infinity Train	Young Min-Gi Park/ Ryan Akagi's brother (voice)	Episode: "The Twin Tapes"	
2022–23	The Santa Clauses	Hugo	6 episodes	
2023	Stillwater	Gull Chick (voice)	Episode: "I'm Bored"/"Art Fair"	
2023–present	Gremlins: Secrets of the Mogwai	Sam Wing (voice)	20 episodes	
2025	Win or Lose	Yuwen (voice)	8 episodes	

== Accolades ==
Award	Date of ceremony	Category	Film	Result	Ref.
Sundance Film Festival	January 26, 2024	Special Jury Award for Best Ensemble	Dìdi	Won	
Gotham Awards	December 2, 2024	Breakthrough Performer	Dìdi	Nominated	
Washington D.C. Area Film Critics Association	December 8, 2024	Best Youth Performance	Dìdi	Nominated	
San Diego Film Critics Society	December 9, 2024	Best Youth Performance	Dìdi	Won	
Seattle Film Critics Society	December 16, 2024	Best Youth Performance	Dìdi	Won	
Critics' Choice Movie Awards	February 7, 2025	Best Young Actor/Actress	Dìdi	Nominated	
