= Giosuè Greco =

Italian composer and producer

- Born: 1990 (age 35–36); Polistena, Italy
- Education: Berklee College of Music
- Occupations: Composer, multi-instrumentalist, and producer
- Website: https://www.giosuegreco.com

Giosuè Greco is an Italian composer, multi-instrumentalist, and producer based in Los Angeles. Greco is known for composing score for film, television, and video games.

== Early life and education ==
Greco was born in 1990 in Polistena, in the province of Reggio Calabria, Italy. He studied music at the Vibo Valentia conservatorio and furthered his musical education by taking a course organized by Umbria Jazz in 2009. After being offered a scholarship to Berklee College of Music, he moved to the United States and completed his diploma in production and sound engineering. After finishing his diploma, he moved to Los Angeles.

== Career ==
In 2015, Greco composed music for the film Coincidental Romance. Greco composed additional music for seasons 1–3 of the ABC drama series The Good Doctor.

In 2018, he composed the music for the Netflix documentary short Period. End of Sentence. During the same year he also worked on Ubisoft's Far Cry 5, providing additional music for the game.

From 2021 to 2022, he worked on Superman & Lois, and composed for 19 episodes of the series. In 2022, Greco started scoring for the sports documentary television series Welcome to Wrexham, produced by Ryan Reynolds and Rob McElhenney.

In 2024, Greco composed the music for the American coming-of-age comedy-drama film Dìdi.

In 2025, Greco co-composed the music for the A24 comedy-horror film Death of a Unicorn.

== Filmography ==
Year	Title	Credit	Notes
2015	Coincidental Romance	Composer	
2016	The 6th Friend	Composer: Additional Underscore Music	
2017	Wake Me Up	Composer	
2018	Maniac	Music Recordist - 10 episodes	TV series
2018	Far Cry 5	Additional Music	Video game
2018	Period. End of Sentence.	Composer	Documentary
2019	The Seer and the Unseen	Composer	Documentary
2019	Shnoof	Composer	Short
2017-2020	The Good Doctor	Composer: Additional Music - 54 episodes	TV series
2020	Wendy	Recording Engineer & Multi-Instrumentalist	
2020	Just Hold On	Composer	Short
2020	A Woman's Place: The Butcher, the Chef and the Restaurateur	Composer	Documentary
2020	The Big Scary S’ Word	Composer	
2021-2022	Superman & Lois	Composer: Additional Music - 19 episodes	TV series
2021	Not Going Quietly	Composer	
2021	The Imperfect Picture	Composer	
2021	After Antarctica	Composer	Documentary
2021	H.A.G.S	Composer	
2021	Luca	Musician	
2022	Bad Vegan: Fame. Fraud. Fugitives.	Composer: Additional Music - 4 episodes	TV series
2022	The Lincoln Project	Additional Music - 3 episodes	TV series
2022	The Long Game: Bigger Than Basketball	Composer - 5 episodes	TV series
2022	Two or More	Composer	
2022	Elsa	Composer	Short
2022	Let The Right One In	Composer	TV series
2022	Notice Me	Composer	Short
2023	Nai Nai & Wài Pó	Composer	Documentary
2022-	Welcome to Wrexham	Composer - 34 episodes	TV series
2024	Didi	Composer	Feature
2025	Olmo	Composer	Feature
2025	Death of a Unicorn	Composer	Feature
2025	The Seat	Composer	Documentary
2026	Stages	Composer	Feature
2026	Crystal Lake	Composer	TV series
