= This Is How It Goes (film) =

- Directed by: Idris Elba
- Screenplay by: Nathaniel Price
- Based on: This Is How It Goes by Neil LaBute
- Produced by: Gina Carter; Alison Jackson
- Starring: Idris Elba; Wunmi Mosaku; Charlie Cox; Elliott Heffernan
- Cinematography: Fabian Wagner
- Production companies: 22Summers; Gaumont; TD Afrique Films
- Distributed by: Apple Original Films
- Countries: United Kingdom; France; Ghana
- Language: English

This Is How It Goes is an upcoming psychological thriller film directed by Idris Elba from a screenplay by Nathaniel Price. It is based on the 2005 play of the same name. It stars Elba, Wunmi Mosaku, Charlie Cox, and Elliott Heffernan.

The film is set to be released by Apple Original Films.

== Cast ==
- Idris Elba as Man
- Wunmi Mosaku as Belinda
- Charlie Cox as Cody
- Elliott Heffernan

== Production ==
In September 2025, it was announced that Idris Elba would be directing a feature adaptation of the 2005 play This Is How It Goes, in which he would also star. Elba portrayed Cody in the original play, though it is confirmed that he would play a different character in the film. In October, Wunmi Mosaku, Charlie Cox, and Elliott Heffernan joined the cast. Principal photography took place in Ghana.

== Release ==
The film is set to be released by Apple Original Films.
