= Blitz (2024 film) =

War drama film by Steve McQueen

- Release poster
- Directed by: Steve McQueen
- Written by: Steve McQueen
- Produced by: Tim Bevan; Eric Fellner; Steve McQueen; Anita Overland; Adam Somner; Arnon Milchan; Yariv Milchan; Michael Schaefer
- Starring: Saoirse Ronan; Elliott Heffernan; Harris Dickinson; Benjamin Clementine; Kathy Burke; Paul Weller; Stephen Graham
- Cinematography: Yorick Le Saux
- Edited by: Peter Sciberras
- Music by: Hans Zimmer
- Production companies: Apple Studios; New Regency Productions; Working Title Films; Lammas Park
- Distributed by: Apple Original Films (worldwide); Altitude Film Distribution (Ireland and United Kingdom theatrical)
- Release dates: October 9, 2024 (BFI); November 1, 2024 (United Kingdom and United States); November 22, 2024 (Apple TV+)
- Running time: 120 minutes
- Countries: United Kingdom; United States
- Language: English

Blitz is a 2024 historical war drama film about WWII written, produced and directed by Steve McQueen. The film stars Saoirse Ronan and Elliott Heffernan (in his film debut), supported by Harris Dickinson, Benjamin Clementine, Kathy Burke, Paul Weller, and Stephen Graham.

Blitz had its world premiere as the opening film at the BFI London Film Festival on 9 October 2024, and was released in selected cinemas in the United Kingdom and United States on 1 November 2024, followed by a streaming release on Apple TV+ on 22 November 2024. The film received generally positive reviews from critics.

== Plot ==
In London during the Second World War, nine-year-old George is the mixed-race son of a white woman, Rita, and Marcus, a Black man who was deported to Grenada. George remains in London after the Nazi bombing has begun, living in Stepney with his mother, the family cat Olly, and Rita's father Gerald, a pianist. Gerald encourages Rita to evacuate George to the country for his safety. Before he leaves, George's grandfather gives him some pocket money, and his mother gives him a Saint Christopher medallion that had belonged to his father.

George is evacuated from the city amidst the Blitz. He is initially upset with his mother for sending him away and refuses to say goodbye to her, leaving her distraught at the station. Aboard the train, several boys taunt him for the texture of his hair, likening it to a dog. Using a line he learned from his grandfather, George stands up to the bullies, which impresses the girl opposite him, who has come to his defence.

Ultimately, after some time aboard the train, he decides to escape. George defiantly jumps off the train to return to his mother in London. He stows away on an eastbound goods train and meets three brothers his own age. He befriends them and shares with them the only food he has packed in his suitcase, a sandwich with strawberry jam. The next morning, George and the brothers escape from the train, although one of them, Tommy, is killed by an oncoming train. Using the coins given to him by his grandfather, George manages to catch a bus to London.

In one flashback, George is called a "Black bastard" by a neighbourhood boy after a street cricket match. In a separate flashback, George's parents dance at a swing club, and Marcus gives Rita the Saint Christopher medallion, revealing it was his own mother's; as the pair leave the club, Marcus is attacked by some racist ruffians intentionally antagonising the two, and as he defends himself, he is ultimately dragged off by police who do not believe he is the victim.

Rita sings a song on a BBC radio broadcast from the factory where she works. Afterwards, her colleagues come on stage before the broadcast has finished in order to protest and demand on air for the tube stations to be opened as shelters. Rita is criticised because of her mixed-race son, whilst spending time with work colleagues in a local pub. Jack, Rita's friend, argues with a man who was rude to Rita.

George arrives in London but cannot find his home in Stepney. While looking into the display windows of a presentation on colonial sugar production, including depictions of Caribbean sugar plantations and grotesque caricature statues of Black men, George is found by Ife, an ARP warden originally from Nigeria. Ife cares for him and brings him to a shelter whose population represents the multiethnic nature of the East End. In the shelter, one family has put up a sheet to separate them from their South Asian Sikh neighbour, who is indignant. A Jewish man attempts to come to the Sikh's aid and decry the racist act, and when the situation escalates, Ife intervenes and delivers a speech reminding all of the citizens in the shelter to remain united. Ife puts George to bed and tells him he will help him find his way home in the morning after his shift. George wakes up the next morning and learns by way of another ARP warden that Ife was killed trying to help a woman evacuate her house during the bombing.

At work, Rita is summoned to her manager's office, and told by members of the Board of Education that her son did not reach his final destination, and in fact jumped from the train. She is furious, and runs out of the factory determined to find him, even if it means forfeiting her job.

Hungry, George is wandering the streets when Jess, a member of a gang of thieves, offers him food and pretends to help him. Instead, George is threatened to help the thieves steal from a damaged jewellery store and a bombed out club. The thieves mistreat and threaten him, even taunting him with the severed limbs of the corpses of killed club patrons. He escapes from the gang and ends up seeking shelter overnight on the tracks in an overcrowded underground station. That night, he dreams of crossing over into another station and watching a musical performance alongside Tommy and Ife.

As the morning nears, the Tube station suddenly begins to flood. No one can escape because the gates were locked to prevent further overcrowding the night before. George is able to escape with the help of others. George gets help and the gates are opened allowing people to escape.

George wakes up in a strange bed. A woman called Ruby is seemingly helpful, but has called the police because there is a missing child notice posted for George. George escapes from the house through the window. He makes his way through Stepney and reaches his block on Clifford Lane. Upon arriving at his house, George sees that his building has been bombed the night before. As workers extract and rescue the family cat Olly from the destroyed home, George peers inside and sees that his grandfather Gerald has been killed in the bombing. As he weeps, Rita comes up behind him. The two are reunited in a bittersweet reunion among the piles of rubble as Rita promises not to send him away again.

== Cast ==
- Elliott Heffernan as George Hanway
- Saoirse Ronan as Rita, George's mother
- Harris Dickinson as Jack
- Benjamin Clementine as Ife
- Kathy Burke as Beryl
- Paul Weller as Gerald, Rita's father
- Stephen Graham as Albert
- Leigh Gill as Mickey Davies
- Mica Ricketts as Jess
- CJ Beckford as Marcus
- Alex Jennings as Victor Smythe
- Joshua McGuire as Clive
- Hayley Squires as Tilda
- Erin Kellyman as Doris
- Sally Messham as Agnes
- Devon McKenzie-Smith as Ken "Snakehips" Johnson
- Celeste as Anita Sinclair
- Christopher Chung as Fred

== Production ==
=== Development ===
In October 2021, it was announced that McQueen would write, direct and produce a new feature film titled Blitz for New Regency, with Lammas Park producing alongside Tim Bevan and Eric Fellner of Working Title Films. In March 2022, McQueen confirmed his next project was going to be about Londoners during the Blitz of World War II and that he had discussed this with Anne, the Princess Royal, as she awarded him his knighthood at Windsor Castle. In June 2022, it was announced that Apple TV+ had picked up the distribution rights. Producers are New Regency's Arnon Milchan, Yariv Milchan and Michael Schaefer.

=== Casting ===
In September 2022, it was announced that Saoirse Ronan would be heading the cast and Adam Stockhausen leading the production design. In December 2022, Harris Dickinson, Erin Kellyman, Stephen Graham and Kathy Burke were added to the cast, along with singer-songwriter Paul Weller in his feature film acting debut. Later that month, Benjamin Clementine, Leigh Gill, Mica Ricketts, CJ Beckford, Hayley Squires and Sally Messham were announced as joining the cast.

=== Filming ===
Principal photography began in London in November 2022. Warner Bros. Studios Leavesden was used as a base. In January 2023, filming took place close to London Waterloo station. Later that month, special effect crews simulated bombs hitting the water in the River Thames at Wapping. Filming also took place in the London borough of Greenwich. In February 2023, it was reported that production had relocated to Hull's old town, with a filming schedule of two weeks. The sound-mixing took nine weeks to complete.

=== Music ===
The idea behind the whole thing is the story of a child who is trying to get through war-torn London, which has been bombed all the time, and trying to find his mother again. What I wanted to do is, I wanted the grownups – you, me, the grownups – to feel the same sort of disassociation, being completely lost in the world, being illogical, not knowing how to get there, not knowing how to get home, not knowing how to find home, and having that horror, that fear that you’ll never find it again; the horror of these massive bombs coming down. So the only way I could think of doing it was to write music which was so brutal and so absolutely violent.

— Hans Zimmer

While Hans Zimmer has previously ventured musically into World War II with films like Dunkirk and Pearl Harbor, working on Blitz allowed him to look at the era, and a facet of his own family history, in a new way. Zimmer revealed that his mother had been "a refugee in England during the Second World War, and Steve McQueen gave me one direction. He said 'After you watch this film, you will understand your mother better'", during a Deadline Sound & Screen event. The story moved Zimmer to create a score to reflect the unrelenting chaos and brutality of the Blitz: "This score is unmitigatedly horrendous", he said. "It is an absolute horrible score, it's so dissonant, it's so committed to this atonality."

== Release ==
Blitz premiered as the opening film at the BFI London Film Festival held at the Royal Festival Hall on 9 October 2024. This was McQueen's third directorial effort to do so after 2018's Widows and 2020's Mangrove, which was part of his Small Axe anthology series. The film was then released in selected cinemas in the US and UK on 1 November 2024, before streaming on Apple TV+ from 22 November.

== Reception ==
=== Critical response ===
On the review aggregator website Rotten Tomatoes, 81% of 180 critics' reviews are positive, with an average rating of 7/10. The website's consensus reads: "A surprisingly old-fashioned tale of survival from director Steve McQueen, Blitz's examination of British society under wartime is given a beating heart by Elliott Heffernan and Saoirse Ronan's lovely performances." Metacritic, which uses a weighted average, assigned the film a score of 71 out of 100, based on 53 critics, indicating "generally favorable" reviews. Writing in The Guardian, Peter Bradshaw scored the film three out of five, and described it as a "well made and unashamedly old-fashioned wartime adventure, heartfelt and rousing and – yes – a bit trad overall", and said that it was "a film about the blitz of 1940 which tries to restate the accepted imagery, the dramatic stock footage and familiar ideas but also absorb revisionist approaches".

Leonard Maltin, reviewing Blitz for his own blog, described it as "powerful and somewhat disarming" and "one of the year’s best films". However, in the Chicago Reader, critic Kylie Bolter, while praising the score, cinematography and some of the performances, said the film didn’t "feel complete or unique". Peter Travers, for ABC News, summarised Blitz as "an indisputably good movie", but concluded that despite "all the elements [being] in place for something extraordinary", it "misses the mark". Critics also praised Yorick Le Saux's "stunningly captured" images for their "stark beauty".

=== Accolades ===
Award/Festival	Date of ceremony	Category	Recipient(s)	Result	Ref.
Artios Awards	12 February 2025	Outstanding Achievement in Casting – Big Budget Feature (Drama)	Nina Gold, Lucy Amos	Nominated	
Black Reel Awards	10 February 2025	Outstanding Director	Steve McQueen	Nominated	
Black Reel Awards	10 February 2025	Outstanding Breakthrough Performance	Elliott Heffernan	Nominated	
Black Reel Awards	10 February 2025	Outstanding Screenplay	Steve McQueen	Nominated	
British Academy Film Awards	16 February 2025	Best Costume Design	Jacqueline Durran	Nominated	
British Academy Film Awards	16 February 2025	Best Sound	John Casali, Paul Cotterell, and James Harrison	Nominated	
British Academy Film Awards	16 February 2025	Outstanding British Film	Steve McQueen, Tim Bevan, Eric Fellner, and Anita Overland	Nominated	
Camerimage	23 November 2024	Special Award for Outstanding Director	Steve McQueen	Won	
Camerimage	23 November 2024	Golden Frog	Yorick Le Saux	Nominated	
Celebration of Cinema and Television	9 December 2024	Director Award	Steve McQueen	Won	
Critics' Choice Movie Awards	12 January 2025	Best Young Actor/Actress	Elliott Heffernan	Nominated	
Hollywood Music in Media Awards	20 November 2024	Best Original Song – Feature Film	"Winter Coat" – Nicholas Britell, Steve McQueen & Taura Stinson	Nominated	
Hollywood Music in Media Awards	20 November 2024	Original Score – Feature Film	Hans Zimmer	Nominated	
Hollywood Music in Media Awards	20 November 2024	Song – Onscreen Performance (Film)	"Winter Coat" – Saoirse Ronan	Nominated	
London Film Critics' Circle	February 2, 2025	British/Irish Performer of the Year	Saoirse Ronan	Won	
London Film Critics' Circle	February 2, 2025	Young British/Irish Performer of the Year	Elliott Heffernan	Nominated	
Los Angeles Film Critics Association	8 December 2024	Best Production Design	Adam Stockhausen	Runner-up	
Montclair Film Festival	27 October 2024	Visionary Director Award	Steve McQueen	Honored	
NAACP Image Awards	February 22, 2025	Outstanding Directing in a Motion Picture	Steve McQueen	Nominated	
NAACP Image Awards	February 22, 2025	Outstanding Writing in a Motion Picture	Steve McQueen	Nominated	
Satellite Awards	26 January 2025	Best Costume Design	Jacqueline Durran	Nominated	
Satellite Awards	26 January 2025	Best Original Song	"Winter Coat" – Nicholas Britell, Steve McQueen, and Taura Stinson	Nominated	
Society of Composers & Lyricists	12 February 2025	Outstanding Original Song for a Dramatic or Documentary Visual Media Production	"Winter Coat" – Nicholas Britell, Steve McQueen, and Taura Stinson	Nominated	
Visual Effects Society Awards	11 February 2025	Outstanding Supporting Visual Effects in a Photoreal Feature	Andrew Whitehurst, Sona Pak, Theo Demiris, Vincent Poitras, Hayley Williams	Nominated	
Visual Effects Society Awards	11 February 2025	Outstanding Special (Practical) Effects in a Photoreal or Animated Project	Hayley Williams, David Eves, Alex Freeman, David Watson	Nominated	
Washington D.C. Area Film Critics Association	8 December 2024	Best Youth Performance	Elliott Heffernan	Won	
Washington D.C. Area Film Critics Association	8 December 2024	Best Original Score	Hans Zimmer	Nominated	
Winter IndieWire Honors	5 December 2024	Wavelength Award	Steve McQueen and Adam Stockhausen	Won	

== Works cited ==
- Kring-Schreifels, Jake (2025). "Silences and Explosions". Filmmaker. Vol. 33, no. 2. The Gotham Film & Media Institute.
