= Washington D.C. Area Film Critics Association Awards 2024 =

23rd Washington D.C. Area Film Critics Association Awards

23rd WAFCA Awards
- Date: December 8, 2024

Highlights
- Best Film: Wicked
- Best Director: Brady Corbet – The Brutalist
- Best Actor: Colman Domingo – Sing Sing
- Best Actress: Mikey Madison – Anora

The 23rd Washington D.C. Area Film Critics Association Awards were announced on December 8, 2024. The nominations were announced on December 7, 2024.

The Brutalist led the nominations with ten, followed by Conclave with nine and Wicked with eight. The categories of Best Stunts, which honors outstanding achievement of stunt coordinators and their teams, and Best Motion Capture were introduced, as well as the Joe Barber Award for Best Portrayal of Washington, D.C. being revived.

== Winners and nominees ==
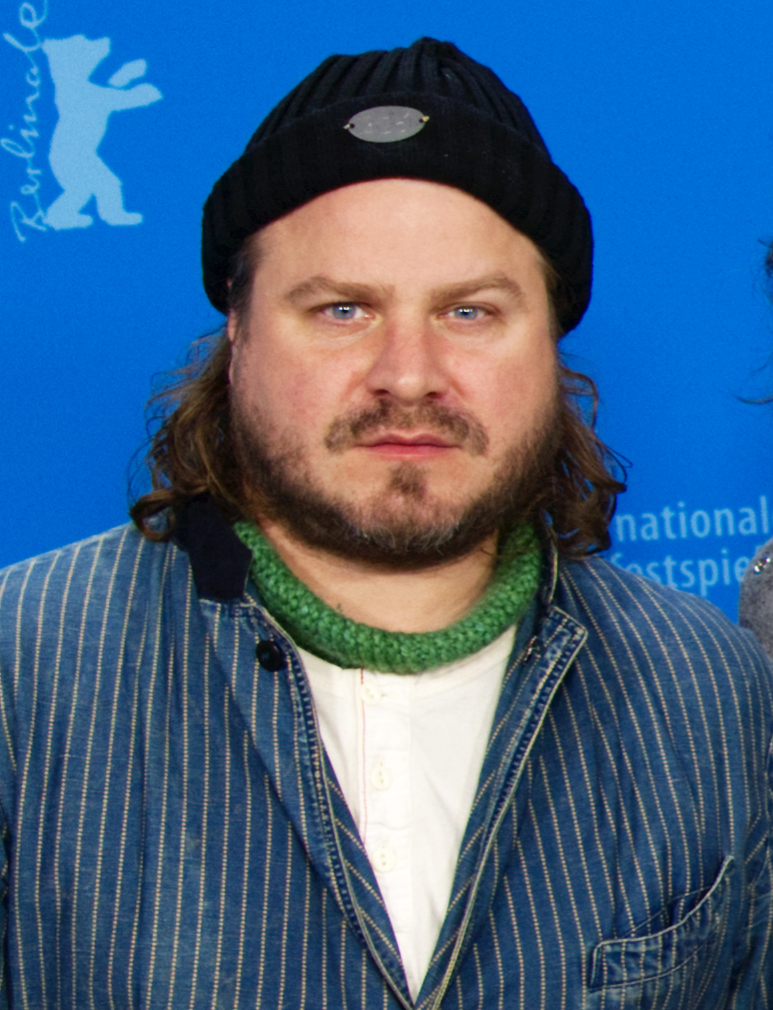
Brady Corbet, Best Director winner

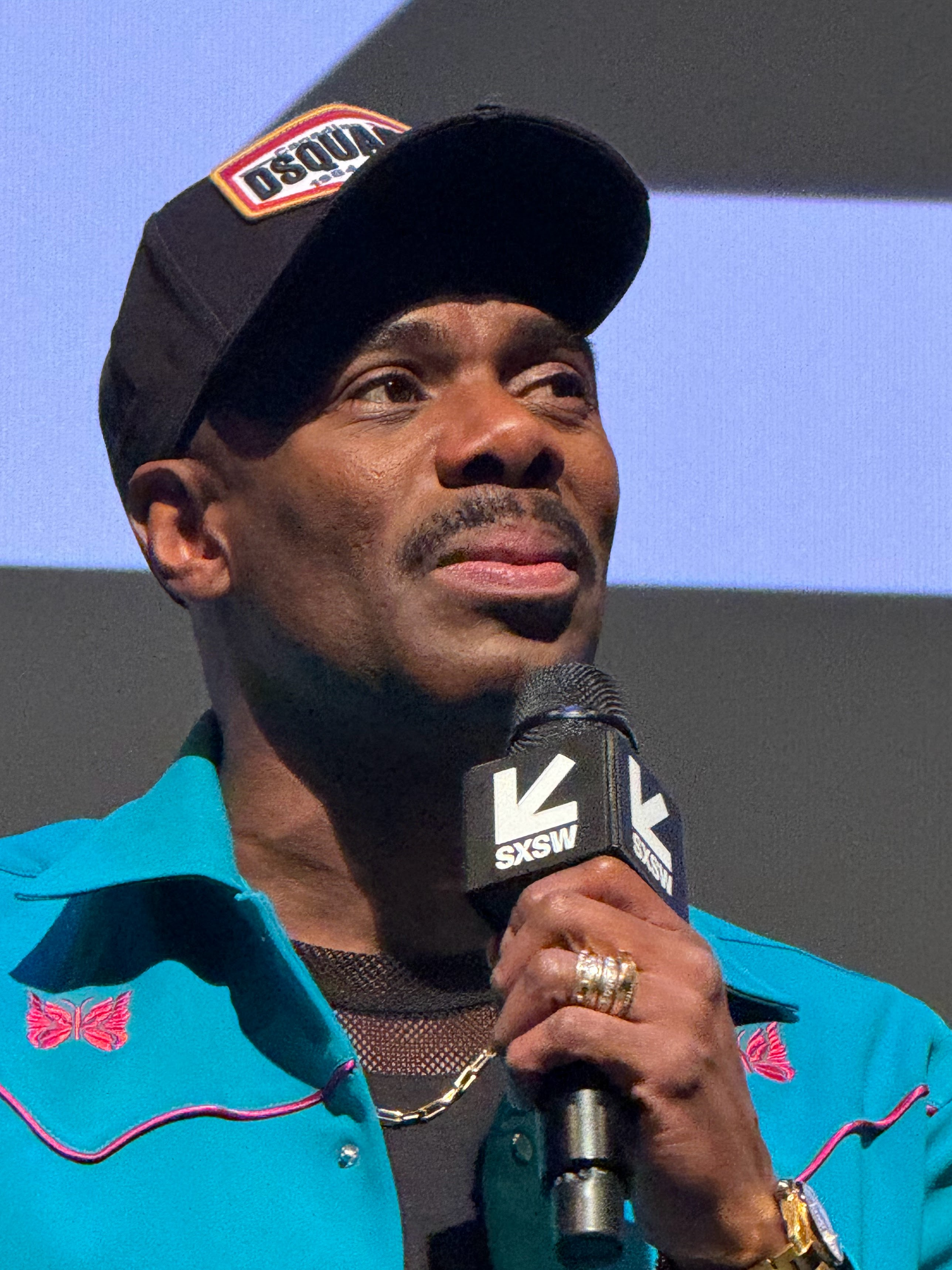
Colman Domingo, Best Actor winner

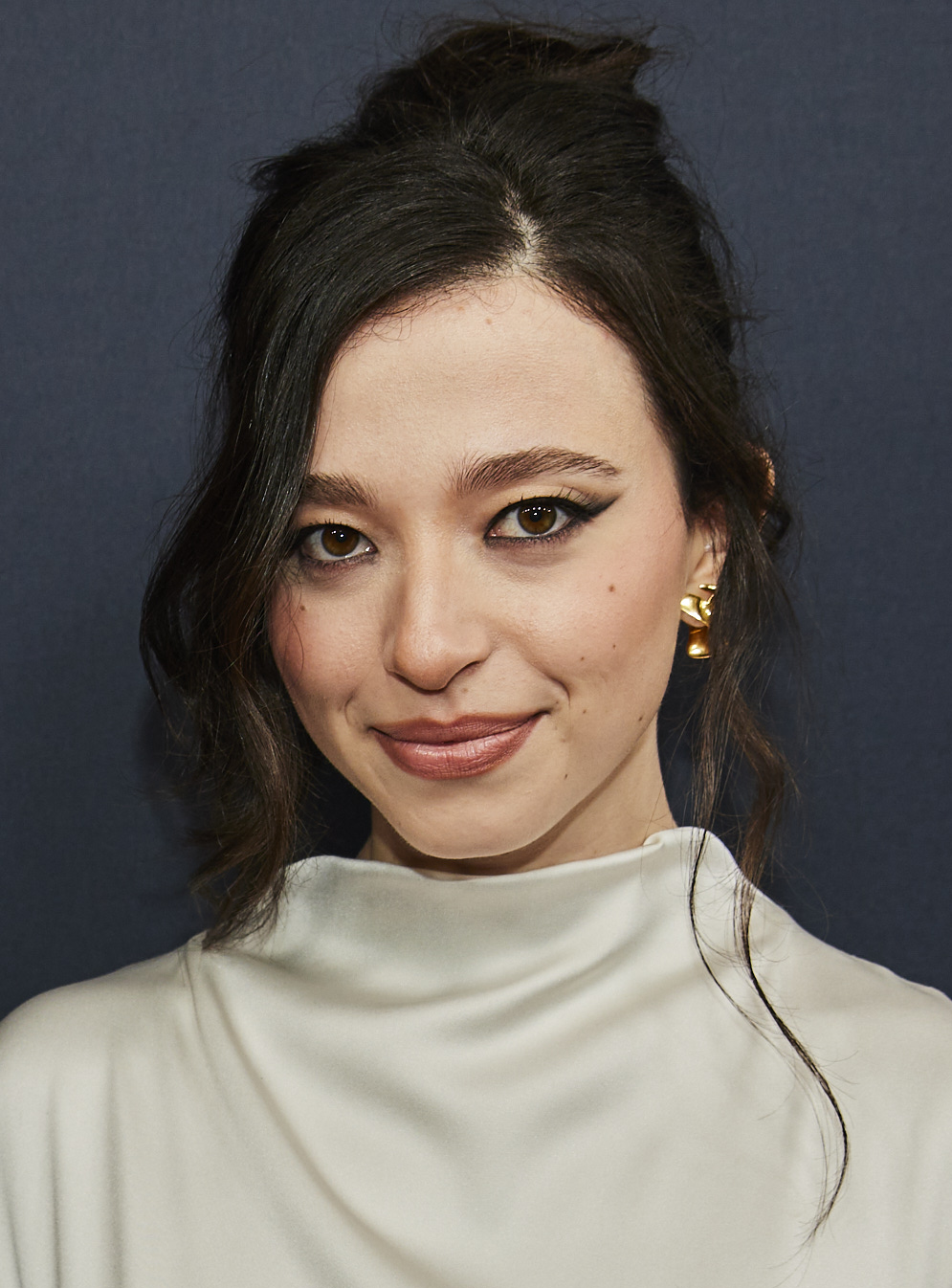
Mikey Madison, Best Actress winner

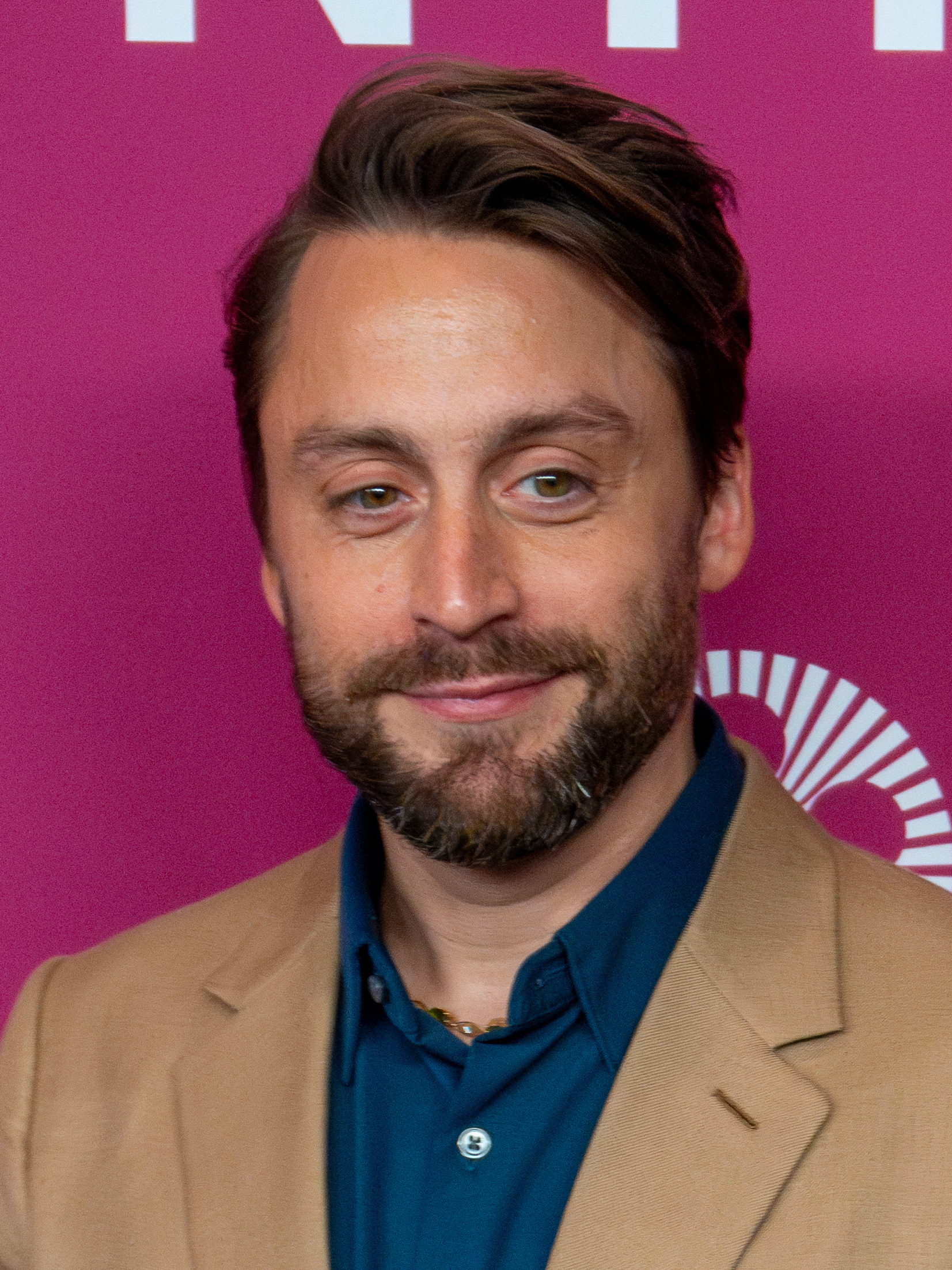
Kieran Culkin, Best Supporting Actor winner

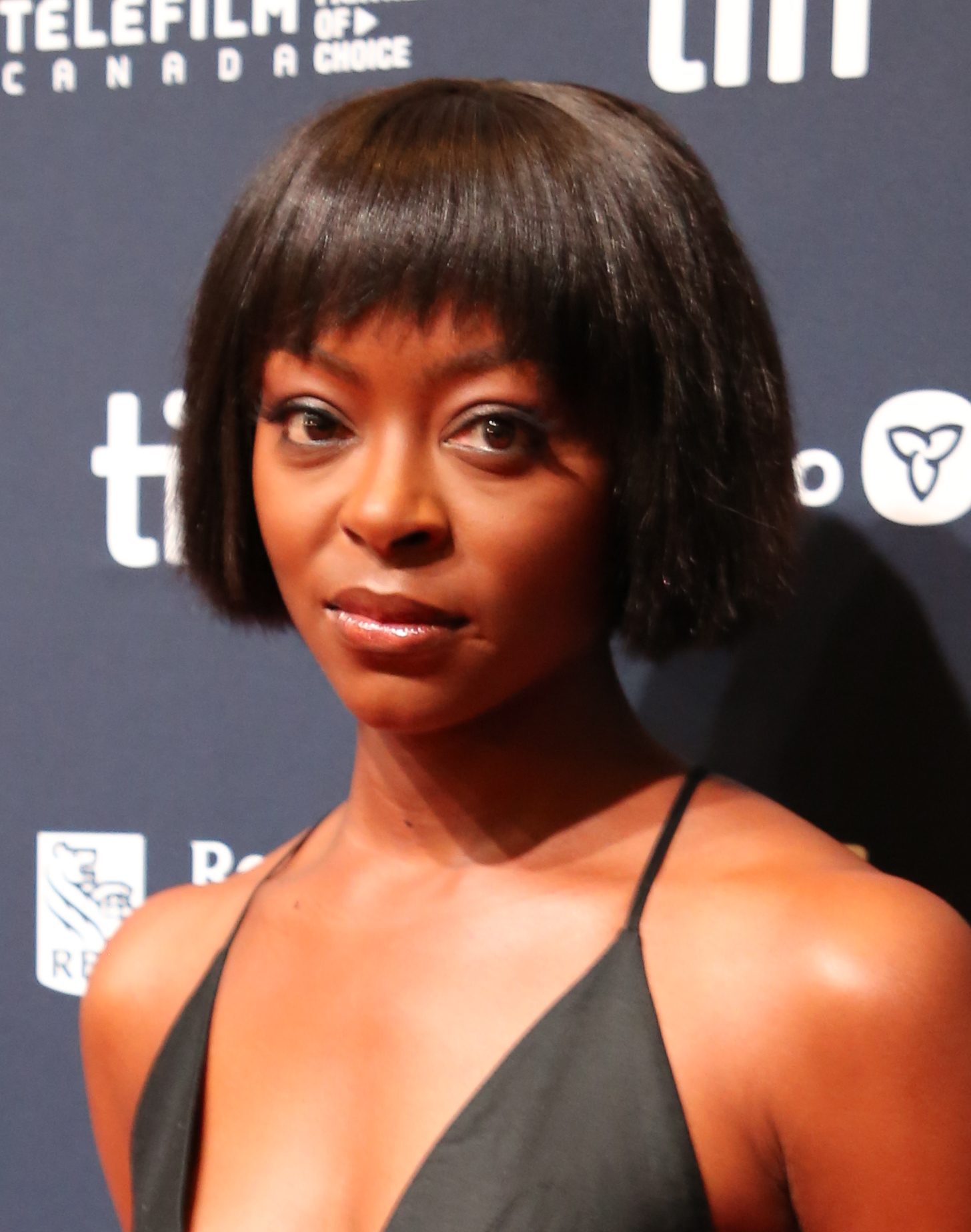
Danielle Deadwyler, Best Supporting Actress winner

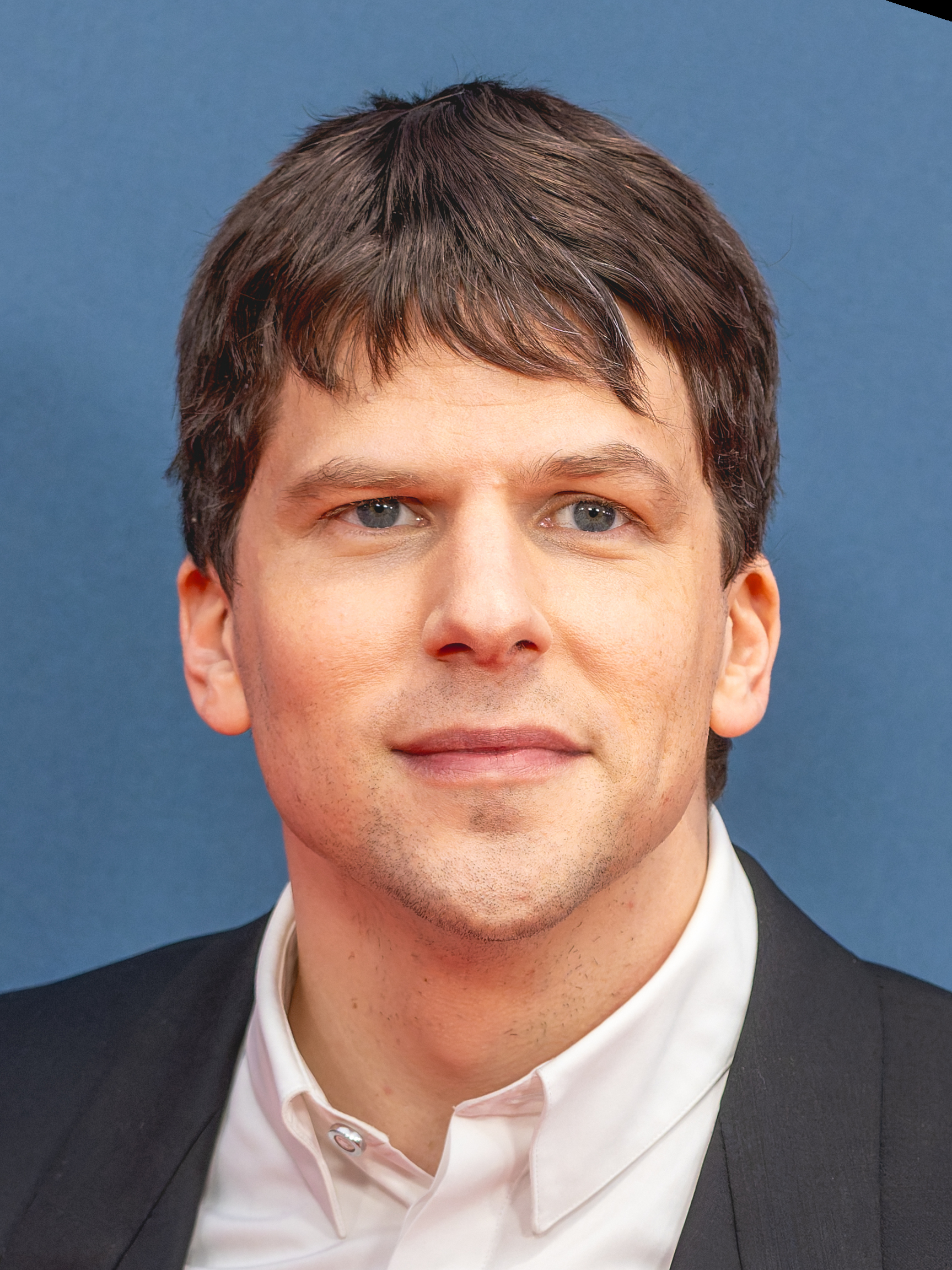
Jesse Eisenberg, Best Original Screenplay winner

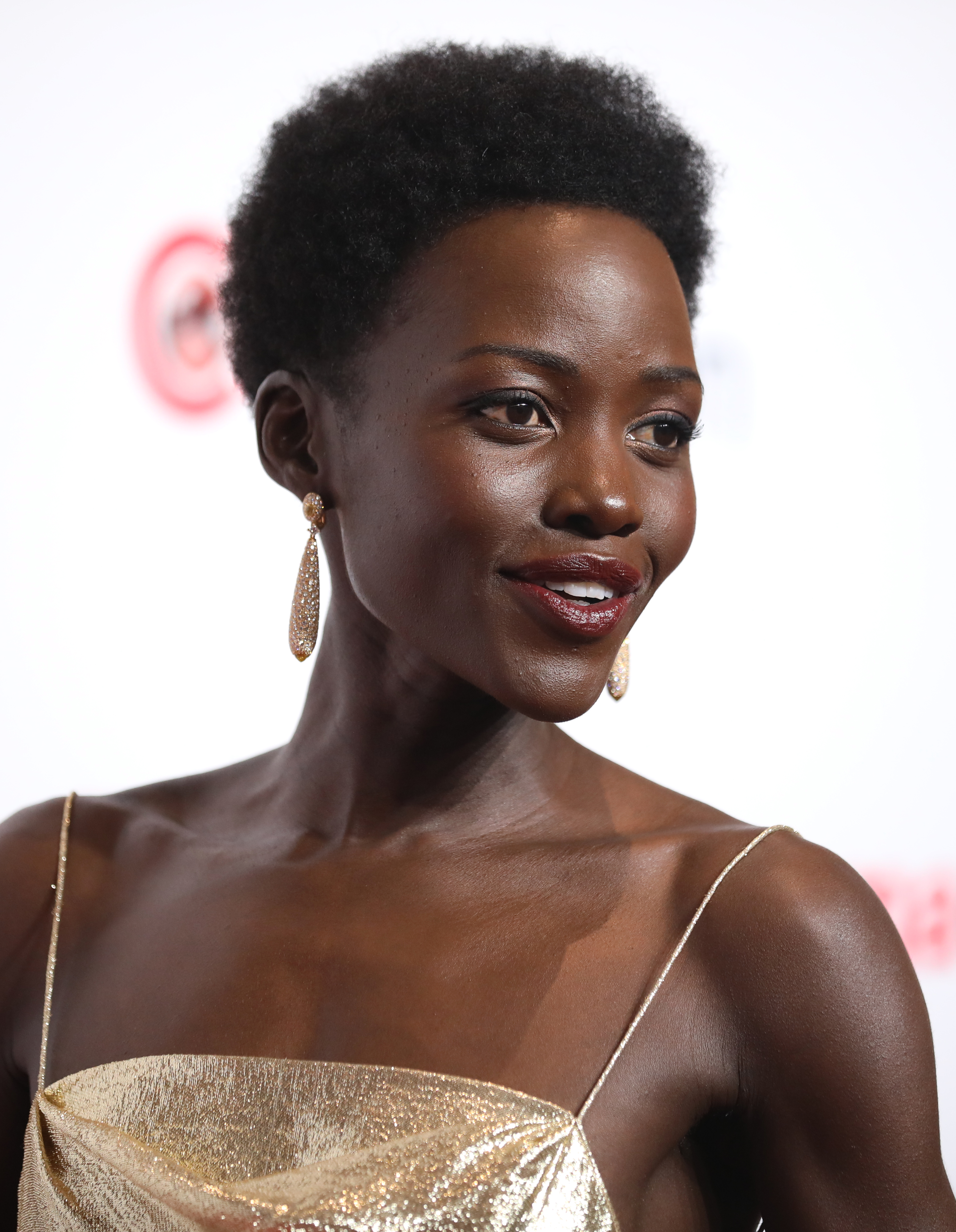
Lupita Nyong'o, Best Voice Performance winner

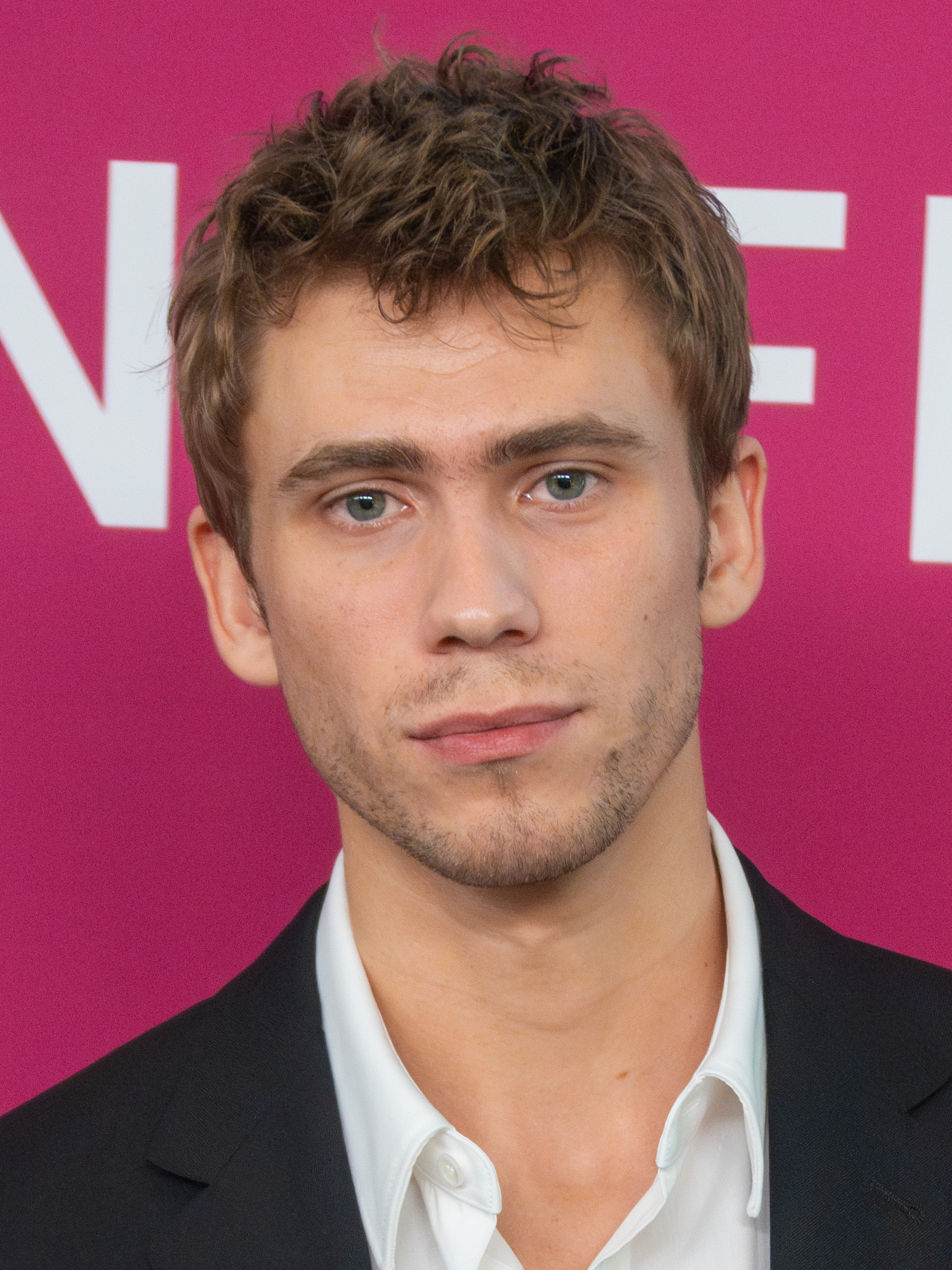
Owen Teague, Best Motion Capture winner

The winners are listed first and in boldface.

Best Film	Best Director
**Wicked**; Anora; The Brutalist; Conclave; Sing Sing	**Brady Corbet – The Brutalist**; Sean Baker – Anora; Edward Berger – Conclave; Jon M. Chu – Wicked; Denis Villeneuve – Dune: Part Two
Best Actor	Best Actress
**Colman Domingo – Sing Sing as John "Divine G" Whitfield**; Adrien Brody – The Brutalist as László Tóth; Timothée Chalamet – A Complete Unknown as Bob Dylan; Daniel Craig – Queer as William Lee; Ralph Fiennes – Conclave as Cardinal Thomas Lawrence	**Mikey Madison – Anora as Anora "Ani" Mikheeva**; Cynthia Erivo – Wicked as Elphaba Thropp; Karla Sofía Gascón – Emilia Pérez as Emilia Pérez / Juan "Manitas" Del Monte; Marianne Jean-Baptiste – Hard Truths as Pansy Deacon; Demi Moore – The Substance as Elisabeth Sparkle
Best Supporting Actor	Best Supporting Actress
**Kieran Culkin – A Real Pain as Benji Kaplan**; Yura Borisov – Anora as Igor; Clarence Maclin – Sing Sing as Clarence "Divine Eye" Maclin; Guy Pearce – The Brutalist as Harrison Lee Van Buren Sr.; Denzel Washington – Gladiator II as Macrinus	**Danielle Deadwyler – The Piano Lesson as Berniece Charles**; Aunjanue Ellis-Taylor – Nickel Boys as Hattie; Ariana Grande – Wicked as Galinda Upland; Isabella Rossellini – Conclave as Sister Agnes; Zoe Saldaña – Emilia Pérez as Rita Mora Castro
Best Original Screenplay	Best Adapted Screenplay
**A Real Pain – Jesse Eisenberg**; Anora – Sean Baker; The Brutalist – Brady Corbet and Mona Fastvold; Challengers – Justin Kuritzkes; The Substance – Coralie Fargeat	**Conclave – Peter Straughan**; Dune: Part Two – Denis Villeneuve and Jon Spaihts; Nickel Boys – RaMell Ross and Joslyn Barnes; Sing Sing – Clint Bentley and Greg Kwedar; Wicked – Winnie Holzman and Dana Fox
Best Animated Feature	Best Documentary
**The Wild Robot**; Flow; Inside Out 2; Memoir of a Snail; Wallace & Gromit: Vengeance Most Fowl	**Super/Man: The Christopher Reeve Story**; Dahomey; Daughters; Music by John Williams; No Other Land; Will & Harper
Best International Film	Best Cinematography
**Emilia Pérez (France)**; Dahomey (Senegal); Flow (Latvia); I'm Still Here (Brazil); The Seed of the Sacred Fig (Germany)	**Nosferatu – Jarin Blaschke**; The Brutalist – Lol Crawley; Conclave – Stéphane Fontaine; Dune: Part Two – Greig Fraser; Nickel Boys – Jomo Fray
Best Editing	Best Original Score
**Anora – Sean Baker (TIE)**; **Dune: Part Two – Joe Walker (TIE)**; The Brutalist – Dávid Jancsó; Conclave – Nick Emerson; Wicked – Myron Kerstein	**The Brutalist – Daniel Blumberg (TIE)**; **Challengers – Trent Reznor and Atticus Ross (TIE)**; Blitz – Hans Zimmer; Conclave – Volker Bertelmann; Nosferatu – Robin Carolan; The Wild Robot – Kris Bowers
Best Production Design	Best Acting Ensemble
**Wicked – Nathan Crowley and Lee Sandales**; The Brutalist – Judy Becker; Dune: Part Two – Patrice Vermette and Shane Vieau; Gladiator II – Arthur Max; Nosferatu – Craig Lathrop and Beatrice Brentnerová	**Conclave**; Anora; The Brutalist; Dune: Part Two; Sing Sing; Wicked
Best Youth Performance	Best Voice Performance
**Elliott Heffernan – Blitz as George**; Alyla Browne – Furiosa: A Mad Max Saga as Furiosa (young); Isabel DeRoy-Olson – Fancy Dance as Roki; Ian Foreman – Exhibiting Forgiveness as Tarell (young); Izaac Wang – Dìdi as Chris "Dìdi" Wang; Alisha Weir – Abigail as Abigail; Zoe Ziegler – Janet Planet as Lacy	**Lupita Nyong'o – The Wild Robot as Roz**; Auliʻi Cravalho – Moana 2 as Moana; Maya Hawke – Inside Out 2 as Anxiety; Brian Tyree Henry – Transformers One as D-16 / Megatron; Amy Poehler – Inside Out 2 as Joy
Best Stunts	Best Motion Capture
**The Fall Guy – Chris O'Hara (stunt coordinator/stunt designer)**; Deadpool & Wolverine – Colin Follenweider (stunt coordinator); George Cottle (supervising stunt coordinator); Alex Kyshkovych (fight coordinator); Dune: Part Two – Lee Morrison (supervising stunt coordinator); Roger Yuan (stunt coordinator/fight coordinator); Gyula Tóth (assistant stunt coordinator); Furiosa: A Mad Max Saga – Guy Norris (action designer/supervising stunt coordinator); Gladiator II – Nikki Berwick and Peter White (stunt coordinators); Ray Nicholas and Cali Nelle (fight coordinators)	**Owen Teague – Kingdom of the Planet of the Apes as Noa**; Eka Darville – Kingdom of the Planet of the Apes as Sylva; Jonno Davies – Better Man as Robbie Williams (young); Kevin Durand – Kingdom of the Planet of the Apes as Proximus Caesar; Peter Macon – Kingdom of the Planet of the Apes as Raka
Joe Barber Award for Best Portrayal of Washington, D.C.
**Civil War**; Daughters; Shirley; Stopping the Steal

== Multiple nominations and wins ==
The following films received multiple nominations:

Nominations	Film
10	The Brutalist
9	Conclave
8	Wicked
7	Anora
7	Dune: Part Two
5	Sing Sing
4	Kingdom of the Planet of the Apes
3	Emilia Pérez
3	Gladiator II
3	Inside Out 2
3	Nickel Boys
3	Nosferatu
3	The Wild Robot
2	Blitz
2	Challengers
2	Dahomey
2	Daughters
2	Flow
2	Furiosa: A Mad Max Saga
2	A Real Pain
2	The Substance

The following films received multiple awards:

Wins	Film
2	Anora
2	The Brutalist
2	Conclave
2	A Real Pain
2	Wicked
2	The Wild Robot
