= The Singers =

2025 American short musical comedy film

- Promotional poster
- Directed by: Sam A. Davis
- Written by: Ivan Turgenev
- Based on: "The Singers" by Ivan Turgenev
- Produced by: Jack Piatt; David Breschel; Sam A. Davis; Charlie Cohen
- Starring: Michael Young; Chris Smither; Will Harrington; Judah Kelly; Matt Corcoran
- Cinematography: Sam A. Davis
- Edited by: Sam A. Davis
- Music by: Island Styles
- Production companies: Highway West Entertainment; Junk Drawer
- Distributed by: Netflix
- Release dates: March 8, 2025 (SXSW); February 13, 2026 (Netflix)
- Running time: 18 minutes
- Country: United States
- Language: English

The Singers is a 2025 American short film directed by Sam A. Davis. The film, featuring a cast discovered through viral videos and street casting, includes Mike Young and Judah Kelly. Based on a 19th-century Russian story by Ivan Turgenev, it depicts an improvised sing-off by downtrodden patrons in a pub.

It had its world premiere in the Narrative Short Competition at the 2025 South by Southwest Film & TV Festival on March 8, 2025. Netflix acquired the global streaming rights of the film on January 16, 2026 and released the film for global audience on February 13, 2026.

It tied with Two People Exchanging Saliva to win Best Live Action Short Film at the 98th Academy Awards.

== Summary ==
At a small blue-collar bar, a construction worker pesters other patrons for money and drinks. The bartender, tiring of his behavior and bragging, offers him a drink if he can out-sing an older regular, then extends the competition to the entire bar: the best singer in the venue will earn a hundred dollars and a free beer.

The patrons participate, with the exception of a younger man who is too shy to sing but reveals a beautiful voice while singing to himself in the bathroom before quietly leaving the bar. While the older regular indeed proves talented, the construction worker is also a skilled singer and pianist. The bartender then joins in the competition with a moving and emotional performance that brings some patrons to tears and inspires a group hug with most of the bar.

As the embrace ends, another patron steps forward, proving himself to be an unexpectedly gifted operatic singer as the competition continues.

== Cast ==
- Michael Young
- Chris Smither
- Will Harrington
- Judah Kelly
- Matt Corcoran
- Michael Keyes

== Production ==
The film is based on a story by Ivan Turgenev Singers published in A Sportsman's Sketches an 1852 cycle of short stories. Davis read the story in A Swim in a Pond in the Rain, a 2021 book of didactic literary analysis by American author and professor George Saunders. Davis was inspired to adapt the short using contemporary methods after watching a viral video of Mike Young, one of the film’s participants, busking in the New York City subway. "I thought it was cool, but I didn’t come away from it thinking I want to make a film about this,” Davis said of reading the story. “That happened moments later when I opened my phone, and the first video that popped up was a viral video of a guy busking in the subway station. It was the most beautiful, soulful, raw performance I had ever heard. The idea for adapting it was suddenly so crystal clear: I would retell this 1850 Russian short story, but with all these really unsuspecting, viral video singing talents who we would curate from TikTok and YouTube and Instagram from all over the world."

Davis spent a year and a half casting viral singing talents he discovered on social media platforms like YouTube, Instagram, and TikTok, searching for terms like “unexpected voice” and "karaoke legend.” The film was created without a script, allowing the participants to portray versions of themselves on screen. His approach synthesized the spontaneity of documentary filmmaking with the intentional, grounded camera work of scripted filmmaking.

Production took place over four days at a Moose Lodge in Los Angeles. Approximately half of each day was dedicated to filming the musical performances, while the remainder focused on improvisational scenes. Davis, who served as both the director and cinematographer, chose to shoot on 35mm film for its rich, nostalgic quality, as well as to lens the performers in a classically cinematic format. The music was recorded live on set and Music Supervision was handled by the award winning Music Supervisor Sean Fernald.

== Release ==
The Singers had its world premiere at the 2025 South by Southwest Film & TV Festival on March 8, 2025 in Narrative Short Competition. On April 13, it was presented in Narrative Shorts Competition at the Florida Film Festival.

It had its New York Premiere at the Tribeca Film Festival on June 5, 2025.

It was presented in the Screens as part of SHORTS PROGRAM: LIVE ACTION 2 in Short Competition at the AFI Fest on October 24, 2025.

It was screened on November 9, 2025 at the Coronado Island Film Festival.

The film became available to stream on Netflix worldwide on February 13, 2026.

== Accolades ==
Award	Date of ceremony	Category	Recipient(s)	Result	Ref.
Indy Shorts International Film Festival	July 28, 2025	Narrative Grand Prize	The Singers	Won	
Indy Shorts International Film Festival	July 28, 2025	Narrative Audience Choice Award	The Singers	Won	
Coronado Island Film Festival	November 9, 2025	Audience Award Winners – Shorts & Emerging Filmmakers: Best Live Action Short	The Singers	Won	
HollyShorts Film Festival	November 17, 2025	Best International Film	The Singers	Won	
HollyShorts Film Festival	November 17, 2025	Best Director	Sam Davis	Won	
Academy Awards	March 15, 2026	Best Live Action Short Film	Sam A. Davis and Jack Piatt	Won (Note: Tied with Two People Exchanging Saliva.)	

== See also ==
- Academy Award for Best Live Action Short Film
