= Period. End of Sentence. =

2018 documentary short film by Rayka Zehtabchi

- Film poster
- Directed by: Rayka Zehtabchi
- Produced by: Rayka Zehtabchi; Guneet Monga; Melissa Berton; Garrett Schiff; Lisa Taback
- Starring: Arunachalam Muruganantham
- Cinematography: Sam Davis
- Edited by: Sam Davis
- Music by: Giosuè Greco, Dan Romer, Osei Essed
- Production companies: The PAD Project; Action India; Girls Learn International; The Feminist Majority Foundation; Oakwood School; Sikhya Entertainment
- Distributed by: Netflix
- Release dates: April 5, 2018 (Cleveland International Film Festival); February 19, 2019 (United States)
- Running time: 25 minutes
- Country: United States
- Language: Hindi

Period. End of Sentence. is a 2018 documentary short film directed by Rayka Zehtabchi about Indian women leading a quiet menstrual health revolution. The film stars Arunachalam Muruganantham, Shabana Khan, Gouri Choudari, Ajeya, and Anita. The documentary short follows a group of local women in Hapur, India, as they learn how to operate a machine that makes low-cost, biodegradable sanitary pads, which they sell to other women at affordable prices. This not only helps to improve feminine hygiene by providing access to basic products but also supports and empowers the women to shed the taboos in India surrounding menstruation – all while contributing to the economic future of their community. The film is inspired by the life of Arunachalam Muruganantham, a social activist from Coimbatore, India.

== Plot ==
Women are in charge of a tremendous change in a Kathikera village in the Hapur district which is 60 km away from Delhi, India. They battle the pervasive shame associated with menstruation. The lack of access to pads among these women for centuries resulted in health issues, school absences, and eventual dropout of the girls. However, when a sanitary pad factory is set up in the hamlet, the women are taught how to produce and sell their own pads, which empowers the women there. They chose the brand name "FLY" for their company because they want women "to arise".

== Reception ==
=== Critical response ===
Period. End of Sentence has an approval rating of 75% on review aggregator website Rotten Tomatoes, based on eight reviews, and an average rating of 6.3/10.

=== Accolades ===
- Winner of the Academy Award for Best Documentary (Short Subject) – 91st Academy Awards
- Winner of the Academy Award qualifying festivals for Best Short Doc at the Cleveland International Film Festival, the Traverse City Film Festival as well as many others including AFIFest, and Savannah.

== See also ==
- Pad Man
- Phullu
- Shinaakht
- Culture and menstruation
- Menstrual hygiene management
- WASH (Water, Sanitation, and Hygiene)
- Menstrual suppression
