= Two People Exchanging Saliva =

2024 French short film

- Release poster
- French: Deux personnes échangeant de la salive
- Directed by: Natalie Musteata; Alexandre Singh
- Written by: Natalie Musteata; Alexandre Singh
- Produced by: Violeta Kreimer; Valentina Merli; Natalie Musteata; Alexandre Singh; Guillaume Houzé; Carol Cohen
- Starring: Zar Amir Ebrahimi; Luàna Bajrami; Aurélie Boquien; Vicky Krieps
- Narrated by: Vicky Krieps
- Cinematography: Alexandra de Saint Blanquat
- Edited by: Hanna Park
- Music by: Bobak Lotfipour
- Production companies: Misia Films; Preromanbritain; Galeries Lafayette
- Distributed by: The New Yorker
- Release date: 30 August 2024 (Telluride)
- Running time: 36 minutes
- Countries: France; United States
- Language: French

Two People Exchanging Saliva (French: Deux personnes échangeant de la salive) is a 2024 French-language short drama film written and directed by Natalie Musteata and Alexandre Singh.

The United States and France co-production film premiered in the Telluride Film Festival at the 51st Telluride Film Festival on 30 August 2024. It tied with The Singers in winning Best Live Action Short Film at the 98th Academy Awards.

== Summary ==
In a dystopian world, kissing is considered inappropriate and a crime that is punishable by death, people avoid brushing their teeth and consume garlic to deter intimate interest, and payment is made in the form of accepting slaps on the face in proportion to equivalent price. Malaise is a young woman newly hired to an upscale department store, and attracts the interest of a wealthy housewife, Angine, to the chagrin and jealousy of her manager Pétulante, who has been Angine's usual sales associate.

Over the course of the next nine days, Malaise and Angine grow close, with Malaise persuading Angine to make larger purchases as an intrigued Angine finds herself becoming attracted to the young woman and enjoying her slaps. Malaise reciprocates her feelings, secretly purchasing a toothbrush and toothpaste from the black market in order to further seduce Angine despite the danger. In the bathroom, however, Pétulante hears Malaise brushing her teeth, an activity considered highly suspicious and taboo.

A woman is arrested in the department store for desperately trying to kiss her unwilling husband, leading to her arrest and execution by being bound, gagged, and thrown off a cliff in a cardboard box. Angine is aware of the danger, as her husband is a designer for these boxes, but after discovering prints of artwork depicting kissing in the woman's purse, she is unable to ignore her feelings any longer.

The next day, Angine brushes her teeth as well as drinking mint liqueur and hurries to the store to meet Malaise, determined to kiss her in private. However, she discovers that Pétulante had falsely claimed Malaise had attacked her and tried to kiss her, handing over her toothbrush and toothpaste to police to confirm the story. Devastated, Angine travels to the ravine full of executed victims and discovers Malaise's body, weeping over it.

A final flashback reveals that during Malaise's solitary birthday at her apartment, which had taken place days earlier, Malaise had wished for Angine to appear and join her, but despite a knock at the door, she had had no visitors; however, Angine had arrived at her apartment and knocked at the door, but then lost her courage and hid, forfeiting what would end up being her only opportunity to connect with Malaise.

== Cast ==
- Zar Amir Ebrahimi as Angine
- Luàna Bajrami as Malaise
- Aurélie Boquien as Pétulante
- Vicky Krieps as the Narrator
- Nicolas Bouchaud as Chagrin
- Mitchell Jean as Jérémiade
- Mustapha Abourachid as Arnaque
- Thibaut De Lussy as Tuyaux
- Lucile Jaillant as Carie

== Release ==
Two People Exchanging Saliva premiered at the 51st Telluride Film Festival in Telluride, Colorado on August 30, 2024. The film’s Los Angeles premiere was at the AFI Fest "After Dark" shorts program on October 25, 2024.

It was screened as part of the Through the Looking Glass shorts program at the 2025 Seattle International Film Festival on May 17, 2025. It was also screened as part of the Official Selection of The Downtown Festival on October 15, 2025 in a shorts program that included films by Riley Lynch and Saodat Ismailova. The film had its online world premiere on November 21, 2025, via The New Yorker. In January 2026, Julianne Moore and Isabelle Huppert joined as executive producers of the film.

== Accolades ==
Award	Date of ceremony	Category	Recipient(s)	Result	Ref.
AFI Fest	28 October 2024	Grand Jury Prize – Live Action Short	Two People Exchanging Saliva	Won	
Clermont-Ferrand International Short Film Festival	9 February 2025	Audience Prize	Two People Exchanging Saliva	Won	
Clermont-Ferrand International Short Film Festival	9 February 2025	Canal+ Award	Two People Exchanging Saliva	Won	
San Francisco International Film Festival	30 April 2025	Golden Gate Award	Two People Exchanging Saliva	Won	
San Francisco International Film Festival	30 April 2025	Mid-Length Film Award	Two People Exchanging Saliva	Won	
Prishtina International Film Festival	26 September 2025	Best Mid-Length Film	Two People Exchanging Saliva	Won	
Out on Film	6 October 2025	Best Drama Short	Two People Exchanging Saliva	Won	
Tallgrass Film Festival	21 October 2025	Best Narrative Short	Two People Exchanging Saliva	Won	
Savannah Film Festival	1 November 2025	Best Shorts Spotlight	Two People Exchanging Saliva	Won	
Brussels Independent Film Festival	8 February 2026	Best Narrative Short Film	Two People Exchanging Saliva	Won	
César Awards	26 February 2026	César Award for Best Fiction Short Film	Two People Exchanging Saliva	Nominated	
Academy Awards	March 15, 2026	Best Live Action Short Film	Alexandre Singh and Natalie Musteata	Won (Note: Tied with The Singers.)	

== See also ==
- Academy Award for Best Live Action Short Film
- 98th Academy Awards
