= Death of a Unicorn =

2025 film by Alex Scharfman

- Theatrical release poster
- Directed by: Alex Scharfman
- Written by: Alex Scharfman
- Produced by: Drew Houpt; Lucas Joaquin; Alex Scharfman; Lars Knudsen; Tyler Campellone; Timothy Headington; Theresa Steele Page
- Starring: Paul Rudd; Jenna Ortega; Will Poulter; Téa Leoni; Richard E. Grant
- Cinematography: Larry Fong
- Edited by: Ron Dulin
- Music by: Dan Romer; Giosuè Greco
- Production companies: Ley Line Entertainment; Square Peg; Secret Engine; Monoceros Media; The Royal Budapest Film Co
- Distributed by: A24
- Release dates: March 8, 2025 (SXSW); March 28, 2025 (United States)
- Running time: 107 minutes
- Country: United States
- Language: English
- Budget: $15 million
- Box office: $16.4 million

Death of a Unicorn is a 2025 American dark fantasy comedy horror film written and directed by Alex Scharfman in his directorial debut. The film stars Paul Rudd and Jenna Ortega as well as a supporting cast of Will Poulter, Téa Leoni, and Richard E. Grant. In the film, a father and daughter on a weekend retreat accidentally hit and kill a unicorn while en route to find a billionaire's house, who seeks to exploit the creature's miraculous regenerative properties.

Death of a Unicorn had its world premiere at the South by Southwest Festival on March 8, 2025 and was released theatrically in North America by A24 on March 28, 2025. It received mixed reviews from critics.

== Plot ==
Lawyer Elliot Kintner and his teenage daughter, Ridley, are traveling in the Canadian Rockies for a weekend at the estate of Elliot's boss, Odell Leopold, and his family—his wife, Belinda, and their grown son, Shepard. On the way, Elliot accidentally strikes and injures a small unicorn with his car. When Ridley touches its horn, she experiences strange, cosmic visions, which Elliot abruptly stops by bludgeoning the creature with a tire iron, splashing blood on them both.

The Kintners arrive at the Leopolds' estate with the unicorn's body hidden in their car. Shortly after, Ridley discovers that the unicorn's blood has cleaned away the acne on her face; Elliot's vision has also improved, and his allergies are gone. The Leopolds eventually discover the unicorn still alive in the car, and their assistant, Shaw, shoots it. Upon learning the unicorn has magical healing properties, Odell suggests they experiment with it.

A group of scientists working for the Leopolds, led by Dr. Song, creates a concoction by grating off some of the unicorn's horn and injecting it intravenously into Odell, which cures his cancer. Odell orders the unicorn taken to their laboratory for further testing, planning to monetize its healing properties. Having read the story behind The Unicorn Tapestries, including a conjectured restoration (Note: No such restoration exists, this is an entirely fictional addition to the available artwork of "The Unicorn Surrenders to a Maiden" tapestry in The Unicorn Tapestries) of details missing from "The Unicorn Surrenders to a Maiden" tapestry, Ridley argues that the Leopolds should not be misusing the body of the unicorn, but they dismiss her concerns. As the unicorn is being transported to a laboratory, a much larger adult unicorn brutally kills Song and several security personnel, but suddenly becomes passive when it meets Ridley. Shaw grazes it with a shotgun, causing it to flee and disappear into the woods. Odell organizes a hunting party and insists that Elliot join them.

Shepard steals a vial of the unicorn's grated horn, which he snorts, and orders another scientist, Dr. Bhatia, to saw off the entire horn. Ridley realizes the unicorn is a foal and is still alive. Meanwhile, Elliot and the hunting party fall into a lethal trap and are ambushed by the larger unicorn and its mate. Several people are killed, including Odell and Shaw. Elliot returns to the estate, where they realize the larger unicorns are the foal's parents. The group sends Bhatia to offer the foal back to the unicorns and Griff to unlock the gate. Upon realizing its horn is missing, the unicorns tear Bhatia apart while Griff flees.

The unicorns follow the remaining four survivors into the estate. One unicorn finds and disembowels Belinda, while Shepard escapes. Elliot, having stolen the horn, lures the other unicorn outside so Ridley can escape. Ridley is caught and held at arrow-point by Shepard, having learned that unicorns are docile toward "a pure-hearted maiden" after experiencing visions from snorting the horn. The parent unicorns arrive and are immediately docile to Ridley. As Shepard ties up the unicorns' legs, Elliot stabs him with the horn, only to get stabbed back with an arrow. Shepard collapses and is fatally kicked by one of the unicorns.

Ridley describes her visions to Elliot as he dies. Seeing Ridley mourning him, the unicorns magically revive Elliot and their foal and leave peacefully. Griff returns with the police, who, upon seeing the numerous dead bodies and the Kintners' bloody clothes, assume they are either witnesses or suspects and promptly arrest them. A female police officer tells her chief that they are bringing in survivors, and he will not be able to believe their story. As they are being driven away, the unicorns return as Griff allows them to pass by his car. They see that the Kintners are handcuffed in the back. As the Kintners put on their seatbelts and brace for impact, the unicorns ram the police car off a lakeside road.

In the closing credits, the imagined details of the "Maiden" tapestry is again shown, revealing that it includes the Rockies, the cave the unicorns live in, some of the death scenes in the film, and also showing a unicorn ramming a carriage into a lake – with two occupants swimming away.

== Cast ==
- Paul Rudd as Elliot Kintner, a widowed lawyer
- Jenna Ortega as Ridley Kintner, Elliot's teenaged-daughter
- Will Poulter as Shepard, the son of Elliot’s boss, Odell
- Anthony Carrigan as Griff, the Leopolds' butler
- Sunita Mani as Dr. Bhatia, a scientist
- Stephen Park as Dr. Song, a scientist
- Jessica Hynes as Shaw, the Leopold family personal assistant
- Téa Leoni as Belinda, Shepard’s mother and the wife of Elliot’s boss, Odell
- Richard E. Grant as Odell, Elliot's boss, Shepard’s father and Belinda’s husband.

In addition, Kathryn Erbe has a brief voice role cameo as the tapestry video narrator.

== Production ==
Death of a Unicorn was announced in May 2023, with Jenna Ortega and Paul Rudd set to star in the film for Alex Scharfman. In November 2023, it was announced that Richard E. Grant, Téa Leoni, Will Poulter, Anthony Carrigan, Sunita Mani, Jessica Hynes, and Steve Park had joined the cast of the film.

Filming began in Hungary in July 2023. The production was granted a waiver to continue with its production during the 2023 SAG-AFTRA strike, as A24 is not part of the Alliance of Motion Picture and Television Producers.

== Music ==
In November 2023, it was announced that the score would be composed by John Carpenter, Cody Carpenter, and Daniel Davies. However, in February 2025, Dan Romer and Giosuè Greco were revealed to have taken over composing duties.

The official trailer, released on December 18, 2024, contained a rendition of "Good Vibrations" by American rock band The Beach Boys.

Musician St. Vincent released the soundtrack song "DOA" on March 28, 2025.

== Release ==
Death of a Unicorn premiered at the 2025 South by Southwest on March 8, 2025, and was released theatrically in the United States by A24 on March 28, 2025. The film became available to stream on HBO Max beginning July 25, 2025.

== Reception ==
=== Box office ===
In the United States and Canada, Death of a Unicorn was released alongside A Working Man, The Penguin Lessons, and The Woman in the Yard, and was projected to gross $7–8 million from 3,050 theaters in its opening weekend. The film made $2.7 million on its first day including an estimated $700,000 from Thursday night previews. It went on to debut to $5.8 million, finishing in fifth. In its second weekend, the film made $2.7 million (dropping 53%), finishing in sixth. A year later, the film's box office performance was deemed "a misfire."

=== Critical response ===
On the review aggregator website Rotten Tomatoes, 52% of 222 critics' reviews are positive, with an average rating of 5.7/10. The website's consensus reads: "Receiving some sparkle from Paul Rudd and Jenna Ortega's father-daughter rapport, Death of a Unicorn's broad satire is a bit too on the horn but makes for an entertainingly splattery creature feature." Metacritic, which uses a weighted average, assigned the film a score of 51 out of 100, based on 40 critics, indicating "mixed or average" reviews. Audiences polled by CinemaScore gave the film an average grade of "B–" on an A+ to F scale.

In a mixed review for The New York Times, Manohla Dargis found the satirical elements of the film unconvincing, writing that the jokes about class-consciousness "don't land hard or at all". Dargis singled out Jenna Ortega's acting as among the best parts of the film and as providing "the story just enough heart". Ty Burr of The Washington Post awarded the film two out of four stars, with praise for the comedic performances but criticism for the direction. Burr wrote: "The result is a tonally confused, gracelessly shot and edited misfire that squanders its premise on escalating suspense and ugly, unconvincing digital effects".

=== Accolades ===
Award / Festival	Date of ceremony	Category	Recipient(s)	Result	Ref.
Sitges Film Festival	19 October 2025	Best Feature Film	Death of a Unicorn	Nominated	
