= Dìdi =

2024 film by Sean Wang

- Theatrical release poster
- Directed by: Sean Wang
- Written by: Sean Wang
- Produced by: Sean Wang; Josh Peters; Carlos López Estrada; Valerie Bush
- Starring: Izaac Wang; Joan Chen
- Cinematography: Sam A. Davis
- Edited by: Arielle Zakowski
- Music by: Giosuè Greco
- Production companies: AntiGravity Academy; Spark Features; Unapologetic Projects; Maiden Voyage Pictures
- Distributed by: Focus Features
- Release dates: January 19, 2024 (Sundance); July 26, 2024 (United States)
- Running time: 91 minutes
- Country: United States
- Languages: English; Mandarin
- Box office: $5.1 million

Dìdi (Chinese: 弟弟; lit. 'Younger Brother') is a 2024 American coming-of-age comedy drama film, written, directed, and produced by Sean Wang in his directorial debut.

The film stars Izaac Wang and Joan Chen. Carlos López Estrada, Josh Peters, Valerie Bush and Chris Columbus serve as producers and executive producers under their AntiGravity Academy, Spark Features and Maiden Voyage Pictures banners, respectively. The film portrays Chris, a Taiwanese-American eighth grader (Wang) at the dawn of social media.

Dìdi had its world premiere at the 2024 Sundance Film Festival on January 19, 2024, where it won the Audience Award: U.S. Dramatic and U.S. Dramatic Special Jury Award: Ensemble. It was released in the United States by Focus Features on July 26, 2024. It received positive reviews and was named one of the top 10 independent films of 2024 by the National Board of Review.

== Plot ==
In the summer of 2008, 13-year-old Chris Wang (often called Dì Di (Note: Chinese for "little brother.")) lives in a middle-class neighborhood of Fremont, California, with his Taiwanese immigrant mother Chungsing, his demanding grandmother Nǎi Nai, (Note: Chinese for "paternal grandmother.") and his older sister Vivian. Chris rarely sees his father, who has moved back to Taiwan for work and supports the family in America with remittances. Chris constantly bickers with Vivian, who is about to leave for UC San Diego. He is not one of the popular kids at school. He makes silly YouTube videos with best friends Fahad and Soup, which incorporate a great deal of juvenile humor.

Chris's behavior and feelings of inadequacy begin to strain his relationships. Chris uses AIM and Facebook to strike up a friendship with his crush, the half-Asian Madi. When they go on a date, she tries to kiss him, but Chris is too nervous to continue. Although Madi tries to reach out after, he is too embarrassed to speak to her and blocks her on AIM. During a group hangout with Fahad, Chris disgusts Fahad's African-American crush by cracking a casually misogynistic joke and luridly describing how he and Fahad once fooled around with a dead squirrel. Fahad decides to distance himself from Chris, lest his crush realize that Fahad's sense of humor is similarly immature. When Fahad demotes him from his "top eight friends" list on MySpace, (Note: A real feature of the website.) Chris is devastated.

Chris begins to realize that his mother is under great stress. Chungsing and Chris have dinner with another Taiwanese mother and her son, Max. The mother makes Chungsing ashamed that Vivian did not get into UCLA. Chungsing criticizes Chris' academics in front of Max, hoping the humiliation will motivate him to study harder. At the mother's suggestion, Chungsing sends Chris to a cram school, where Max's friend Josh ruthlessly bullies him. In addition, although Nǎi Nai is warm and grandmotherly to Chris, she harshly criticizes Chungsing's parenting and negatively compares her to her absent son. Chris overhears Chungsing lose her temper and threaten to send Nǎi Nai back to Taiwan. Finally, Chungsing is disappointed when a local painting competition rejects her submission.

Chris sees an opportunity to become cool when a trio of older skateboarders recruit him to film highlight reels for them. Still smarting from Madi's comment that he is cute for an Asian, he tells the skateboarders (who are white and African-American) that he is half-Asian. They take him to a party where he tries alcohol and marijuana; when he gets sick, Vivian covers for him. He reconciles with Vivian before she leaves for college. The skateboarders visit Chris's home and find his footage unusable. Chungsing, unaware of Chris' deception, greets the skateboarders and reveals that Chris is not half-Asian. Chris angrily berates his mother to get her to leave. The other boys are shocked to see Chris treat his mother rudely, and leave in disapproval.

At cram school, Chris hits Josh after Josh mocks him for his failed date with Madi and is nearly expelled. In the car back home, Chris yells at Chungsing, calling her a failed artist who does not contribute to the family. Chungsing bitterly responds that Chris is an embarrassment to the family and that she might have been a successful painter if Vivian and Chris had never been born. Chris runs away from home for a night. When Chris returns home, Chungsing conciliates him by recounting how Vivian also ran away from home for 3 days when she was 14 and that as much as she likes to paint, her children are her true dream.

On the first day of high school, Chris attempts to reconcile with Madi after months of ignoring her. She rebuffs him, citing that he beat up her friend Josh. He joins a club for visual arts, and Fahad nods hello when Chris greets him. Chungsing picks up Chris from school, and he tells her about his day.

== Cast ==
- Izaac Wang as Chris "Dìdi" Wang
- Joan Chen as Chungsing Wang
- Shirley Chen as Vivian Wang
- Chang Li Hua as Nǎi Nai
- Mahaela Park as Madi
- Raul Dial as Fahad Mahmood
- Tarnvir Singh as Hardeep
- Aaron Chang as Jimmy "Soup" Kim
- Chiron Denk as Donovan
- Sunil Maurillo as Cory
- Montay Boseman as Nugget
- Alysha Syed as Jade
- Alaysia Simmons as Ellie
- Georgie August as Georgia
- Jayden Chiang as Max
- Joziah Lagonoy as Josh
- Spike Jonze as Dead Squirrel (voice)
- Sheng Wang as Dead Fish (voice)
- Stephanie Hsu as Kissing Tutorial Instructor

== Production ==
Principal photography took place in July 2023 in Fremont, California. The film consists mostly of first-time actors from the Bay Area. The film was previously selected for the 2023 Sundance Institute Screenwriting & Directors Lab and the 2022 SFFILM Rainin Grant.

=== Music ===
Dìdi (Original Motion Picture Soundtrack)

Film score by Giosuè Greco
- Released: July 26, 2024
- Length: 18:36
- Label: Back Lot Music
- Producer: Giosuè Greco

Giosuè Greco chronology
After Antarctica (Original Motion Picture Soundtrack) (2024)	Dìdi (Original Motion Picture Soundtrack) (2024)	Notice to Quit (Original Motion Picture Soundtrack) (2024)

The film score was composed by Giosuè Greco, who also scored Wang's Nǎi Nai & Wài Pó (2023). The score was released digitally on July 26, 2024, through Back Lot Music, and on vinyl five days later through Mondo. The film also includes a number of songs from the 2000s; music supervisor Toko Nagata drew from the pop punk and hip hop music that was popular in that time period. Nagata received permission from Future Islands to use one of their albums, but Wang vetoed it as its inclusion would have been anachronistic with the film's mid-2008 setting. The film features "Touchdown Turnaround (Don’t Give Up on Me)" by Hellogoodbye used as a ringtone. Motion City Soundtrack wrote "Stop Talking", their first new song in over a decade, for the film's closing credits; they got in touch after Wang's Instagram story about their performance at the When We Were Young festival. The single was released digitally on August 8, 2024, and was also released on 7-inch vinyl; its music video was also directed by Wang and features actors from Dìdi in character filming a YouTube video on a camcorder.

All tracks are written by Giosuè Greco.

Dìdi (Original Motion Picture Soundtrack) track listing
No.	Title	Length
1.	"Skating Tricks"	0:57
2.	"Camo Shorts"	1:01
3.	"Nai Nai Is Beautiful"	1:12
4.	"Not Like Most Guys <3"	2:30
5.	"Counting the Day"	0:37
6.	"Yes, Delete"	0:42
7.	"Stolen Texts"	0:39
8.	"What's on Your Mind?"	0:43
9.	"The Squirrel Story"	1:07
10.	"Only Room for One More"	0:37
11.	"Have Fun in College"	1:16
12.	"I'm Your Friend"	0:48
13.	"Running Away from Home"	2:01
14.	"First Day of High School"	1:40
15.	"Dìdi"	2:37

== Release ==
Dìdi had its world premiere at the Sundance Film Festival on January 19, 2024. A few days later, Focus Features acquired distribution rights to the film. It also screened at South by Southwest on March 12, 2024, and had its international premiere at the Beijing International Film Festival on April 19, 2024. It closed the 11th edition of Sundance London on June 9, 2024. It began a limited theatrical release in the United States on July 26, 2024, followed by a wide release on August 16.

=== Home media ===
The film was available for premium digital rental and sale on September 3, 2024, and was released on Blu-ray on October 29, 2024.

== Reception ==
=== Critical reception ===
On the review aggregator website Rotten Tomatoes, 96% of 122 critics' reviews are positive, with an average rating of 7.9/10. The website's consensus reads: "A semi-autobiographical love letter to teenage angst that's also slyly self-critical, Dìdi is a deeply moving personal statement by writer-director Sean Wang." Metacritic, which uses a weighted average, assigned the film a score of 78 out of 100, based on 37 critics, indicating "generally favorable" reviews.

In her review for The Guardian, Adrian Horton described Dìdi as "easily one of the best, most seamless films [she's] seen on the experience of growing up online" and declared that it has a "clear antecedent" in Eighth Grade (2018). Bob Mondello of NPR wrote that the film "has plenty to say about social media changes and cultural identity, and ends up feeling a lot like its pintsized hero – cute, charming, exasperating, promising."

Filmmakers Karyn Kusama, Dana Ledoux Miller and Lance Oppenheim and former U.S. President Barack Obama all cited Dìdi as among their favorite films of 2024, with Miller saying "Not only do Joan Chen and Sean Wang have the most adorable filmmaking meet-cute of all time, they've crafted something truly special together. Here's hoping this is the first of many collaborations between them."

=== Accolades ===
Award	Date of ceremony	Category	Nominee(s)	Result	Ref.
Sundance Film Festival	January 26, 2024	Grand Jury Prize – U.S. Dramatic	Dìdi	Nominated	
Sundance Film Festival	January 26, 2024	Audience Award – U.S. Dramatic	Dìdi	Won	
Sundance Film Festival	January 26, 2024	Special Jury Award for Best Ensemble	Izaac Wang, Joan Chen, Shirley Chen and Chang Li Hua	Won	
Southwest Film & TV Festival	March 16, 2024	Audience Award: Festival Favorite	Dìdi	Nominated	
Seattle International Film Festival	May 27, 2024	Best Director	Sean Wang	Runner-up	
Seattle International Film Festival	May 27, 2024	Grand Jury Prize – Best Feature Film	Dìdi	Nominated	
Seattle International Film Festival	May 27, 2024	Youth Jury Prize for Best Futurewave Feature	Dìdi	Nominated	
Munich International Film Festival	July 5, 2024	CineKindl Audience Award	Dìdi	Won	
Miskolc International Film Festival	September 14, 2024	Emeric Pressburger Prize (Best Feature Film)	Dìdi	Nominated	
Celebration of Cinema and Television	November 12, 2024	Career Achievement Award	Joan Chen	Won	
Gotham Awards	December 2, 2024	Breakthrough Performer	Izaac Wang	Nominated	
Washington D.C. Area Film Critics Association	December 8, 2024	Best Youth Performance	Izaac Wang	Nominated	
Astra Film Awards	December 8, 2024	Best First Feature	Sean Wang	Nominated	
San Diego Film Critics Society	December 9, 2024	Best First Feature	Sean Wang	Runner up	
San Diego Film Critics Society	December 9, 2024	Best Youth Performance	Izaac Wang	Won	
San Diego Film Critics Society	December 9, 2024	Best Supporting Actress	Joan Chen	Runner up	
San Francisco Bay Area Film Critics Circle	December 15, 2024	Best Supporting Actress	Joan Chen	Won	
Seattle Film Critics Society	December 16, 2024	Best Supporting Actress	Joan Chen	Nominated	
Seattle Film Critics Society	December 16, 2024	Best Youth Performance	Izaac Wang	Won	
Greater Western New York Film Critics Association	January 4, 2025	Best Supporting Actress	Joan Chen	Nominated	
Greater Western New York Film Critics Association	January 4, 2025	Best Breakthrough Performance	Izaac Wang	Nominated	
Austin Film Critics Association	January 6, 2025	Best First Film	Sean Wang	Nominated	
Alliance of Women Film Journalists	January 7, 2025	Best Actress in a Supporting Role	Joan Chen	Nominated	
AARP Movies for Grownups Awards	January 11, 2025	Best Supporting Actress	Joan Chen	Won	
AARP Movies for Grownups Awards	January 11, 2025	Best Intergenerational Movie	Dìdi	Nominated	
Critics' Choice Movie Awards	February 7, 2025	Best Young Actor/Actress	Izaac Wang	Nominated	
Independent Spirit Awards	February 22, 2025	Best First Feature	Dìdi	Won	
Independent Spirit Awards	February 22, 2025	Best First Screenplay	Sean Wang	Won	
Independent Spirit Awards	February 22, 2025	Best Supporting Performance	Joan Chen	Nominated	
Independent Spirit Awards	February 22, 2025	Best Editing	Arielle Zakowski	Nominated	
