= Elliott Heffernan =

English child actor

Elliott Heffernan is an English child actor. He made his film debut playing George Hanaway in Steve McQueen's World War Two drama Blitz (2024).

== Career ==
He had a starring role as George Hanaway in Steve McQueen's World War Two drama Blitz, playing the son of Saoirse Ronan's character, making his way back to London after fleeing evacuation. For the role he began auditioning at the age of 8 years-old in 2021, having just completed a school play as The Genie in a production of Aladdin. Filming took place in 2022 and into 2023. It was released in 2024, when he was eleven years-old. McQueen said he was looking for a child actor who would display the "innocence of childhood...as well as the immense emotional journey he endures as he makes his way back home through many terrifying experiences," he says. "I didn't know if he existed and then I discovered Elliott." He has discussed completing a lot of his own stunts for the film, including being immersed in water when an underground station was flooded, and being winched 50 feet into the air for a scene that was later cut from the final film, although he did not film a wide shot where his character jumps from a moving train. Praise for his performance included The New Yorker who called him "gravely captivating" and able to wrap "each expression and gesture around a hard little nubbin of distrust." Clarisse Loughrey in The Independent said that the revelations of the film were "communicated with such grace through Heffernan's performance." Robbie Collin in The Daily Telegraph described it as "a wonderful performance that's by turns clear and enigmatic".

For the role in Blitz, he was nominated for Best Young Actor/Actress at the 30th Critics' Choice Awards in February 2025. He was also nominated in the Young British or Irish Performer category at the London Film Critics Circle Awards. He was nominated for the Black Reel Award for Outstanding Breakthrough Performance. He was nominated for Best Youth Performance (For a performer under the age of 18) at the San Diego Film Critics Society Awards 2024. He won Best Youth Performance at the Washington D.C. Area Film Critics Association Awards 2024.

== Personal life ==
He is from Bedfordshire, England. He has two sisters.

== Filmography ==
Year	Title	Role	Notes
2024	Blitz	George Hanaway	Lead role. Feature film
2025	The Plague	Tic Tac	Feature film
TBA	The Wanted Man	TBA	Main role; upcoming series
TBA	This Is How It Goes	TBA	Lead role. Feature film; post-production
