= Nǎi Nai & Wài Pó =

2023 documentary short film by Sean Wang

- Directed by: Sean Wang
- Produced by: Malcolm Pullinger; Sam Davis
- Cinematography: Sam Davis
- Edited by: Sean Wang
- Music by: Giosuè Greco
- Production companies: Disney Branded Television; Even/Odd; Junk Drawer
- Distributed by: Disney+; Hulu
- Release dates: 11 March 2023 (SXSW); 9 February 2024 (United States)
- Running time: 17 minutes
- Country: United States
- Language: Mandarin

Nǎi Nai & Wài Pó (Chinese: 奶奶跟外婆; pinyin: Nǎinai gēn Wàipó; also known as Grandma & Grandma) is a 2023 documentary short film directed by Sean Wang about his Taiwanese immigrant paternal and maternal grandmothers. It was acquired by Disney Entertainment for distribution and premiered on Disney+ and Hulu on February 9, 2024. The film was nominated for Best Documentary Short Film at the 96th Academy Awards.

== Premise ==
The film features Wang's elderly grandmothers as he films them going about their daily lives. Yi Yan Fuei, Wang's paternal grandmother (nǎi nai), is 94 years old, while Chang Li Hua, his maternal grandmother (wài pó), is 83. They are both Taiwanese immigrants who live together in their home in Fremont, California, sleeping in the same bed and spending their day together.

== Production ==
The short was filmed in 2021 during the COVID-19 pandemic, as Wang had returned home from New York City. Wang was inspired to create the film when he spent more time with his grandmothers and realized "they're the most pure form of joy in my life." Moreover, Wang calls this film a "personal love letter" to his grandmothers. At the time of filming, anti-Asian racism and hate crimes were becoming more prominent in the United States as a result of the pandemic. Wang also owed the juxtaposition of reading news of violence and spending time with his cheerful grandparents as inspiration for the film. The film touches on themes of family, loneliness, and mortality as close friends pass.

== Release ==
The film premiered at South by Southwest on March 11, 2023, where it won both the Grand Jury and Audience Award for documentary shorts. It was later screened at AFI Fest on October 27, 2023, winning the Grand Jury Prize.

In November 2023, Disney Branded Television acquired the film for distribution. It was announced that the short would be the first of a revival of the People & Places series, which originally ran from 1953 to 1960 and featured short subject documentary films set in various locations around the world. The film was released on both Disney+ and Hulu on February 9, 2024.

== Accolades ==
Award	Date of ceremony	Category	Recipient(s)	Result	Ref.
Academy Awards	March 10, 2024	Best Documentary Short Film	Nǎi Nai & Wài Pó	Nominated	
AFI Fest	October 30, 2023	Grand Jury Prize – Documentary Short	Nǎi Nai & Wài Pó	Won	
Camerimage	November 18, 2023	Golden Frog (Short Documentary Film)	Nǎi Nai & Wài Pó	Nominated	
Chicago International Film Festival	October 22, 2023	Best Documentary Short	Nǎi Nai & Wài Pó	Nominated	
deadCENTER Film Festival	June 11, 2023	Best Documentary Short	Nǎi Nai & Wài Pó	Won	
Seattle International Film Festival	May 21, 2023	Short Film Award – Documentary	Nǎi Nai & Wài Pó	Won	
SXSW Film Festival	March 13, 2023	Grand Jury Award – Documentary Short	Nǎi Nai & Wài Pó	Won	
SXSW Film Festival	March 13, 2023	Audience Award – Documentary Short	Nǎi Nai & Wài Pó	Won	
