= Rayka Zehtabchi =

Iranian-American filmmaker

- رایکا زهتابچی
- Years active: 2015-present
- Notable work: Period. End of Sentence.

Rayka Zehtabchi is an Iranian-American filmmaker best known for her 2019 Academy Award-winning documentary short Period. End of Sentence., which addresses the topic of period poverty. Her previous film, Madaran, was an Iranian-language short about an Iranian mother who must decide whether to spare the life of her son's killer. Zehtabchi is the first Iranian-American woman to win an Academy Award. After the success of Period. End of Sentence, Zehtabchi collaborated with Planned Parenthood and We Testify to make a short film addressing abortion stigma, which was released in 2020. Her newest short film, Long Line of Ladies, premiered at the 2022 Sundance Film Festival. The film won the award for Best Documentary Short at SXSW 2022.

== Filmography ==
Year	Title	Director	Writer	Producer	Notes
2016	Madaran	Yes	Yes	Yes	
2016	We Home	Yes	No	No	
2018	Period. End of Sentence.	Yes	No	Yes	
2019	Shnoof	Yes	No	Yes	
2020	Just Hold On	Yes	Yes	No	
2020	A Woman's Place: The Butcher, the Chef and the Restaurateur	Yes	No	No	
2021	Are You Still There?	Yes	Yes	No	
2022	Long Line of Ladies	Yes	No	Yes	
2023	They Came from All Over	Yes	No	No	
