= Strawberry jam =

Fruit jam made with strawberries

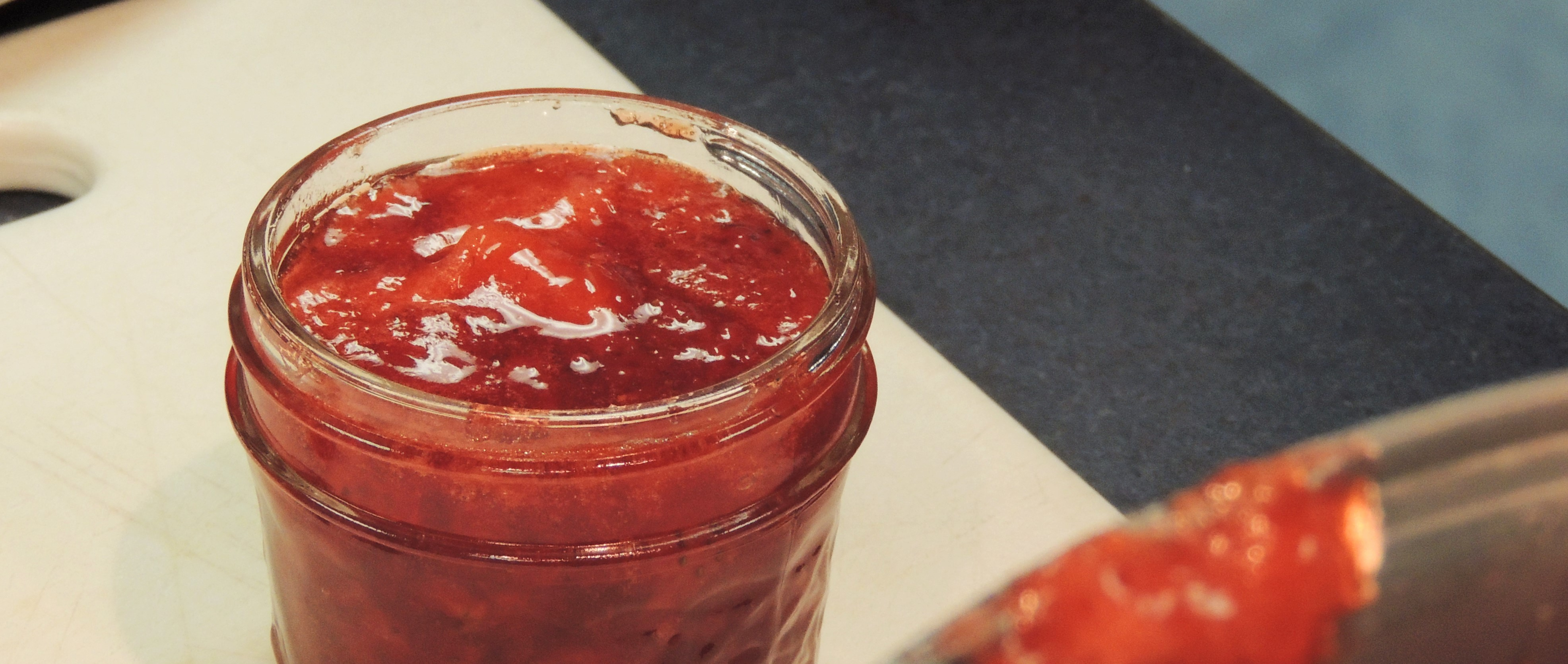
- Type: Fruit preserves
- Place of origin: Europe and Middle East
- Main ingredients: Strawberries; Sugar; Pectin; Lemon juice

Strawberry jam is a sweetened spread made by cooking crushed or chopped strawberries with sugar, pectin, and typically an acid (like lemon juice) until it thickens. It consists of fruit pulp and pieces, resulting in a soft, spreadable consistency that is less firm than jelly but often thicker and more fruit-filled than preserves.

== Characteristics and components ==
Strawberry jam is soft, with a spreadable texture, usually bright red-pink in color, and invokes a vibrant, cooked-fruit flavor. It is typically composed of mashed or chopped strawberries, a high percentage of sugar, pectin for gelling, and an acid (such as lemon juice) to aid the set. It is commonly used as a spread for bread, toast, and scones, or as a filling for pastries and cakes. It is often canned or sealed for long-term storage.
