= Sean Wang =

Film director

- Born: 1994 or 1995 (age 31–32)
- Education: University of Southern California (BFA)
- Occupation: Film director
- Years active: 2020–present
- Notable work: Nǎi Nai & Wài Pó (2023); Dìdi (2024)

Chinese name
- Traditional Chinese: 王湘聖
- Simplified Chinese: 王湘圣
Transcriptions
Standard Mandarin
- Hanyu Pinyin: Wáng Xiāngshèng

Sean Wang (Chinese: 王湘聖; born 1994 or 1995) is a Taiwanese-American film director. His documentary short, Nǎi Nai & Wài Pó, premiered at the 2023 South by Southwest, where it won both the Grand Jury Award and the Audience Award. It went on to be nominated for Best Documentary Short Film at the 96th Academy Awards.

His feature-length directorial debut, Dìdi, premiered at the 2024 Sundance Film Festival, where it received the U.S. Dramatic Audience Award. Wang also won two Independent Spirit Awards for the film.

In June 2025, Wang was invited to join the Short Films Branch of the Academy of Motion Picture Arts and Sciences.

== Early life and education ==
Wang is from Fremont, California, and was raised in a Taiwanese American family. He attended and graduated from Irvington High School. Afterwards, he attended film school at the University of Southern California, where he graduated with a bachelor's degree in film and video production in 2016, and worked for Google Creative Lab. He participated in multiple Sundance Institute programs, including the director and screenwriter labs.

== Filmography ==
- Still Here (2020)
- H.A.G.S. (2021)
- Sunday (2021)
- Dumbfoundead: Secret Menu (2022)
- Nǎi Nai & Wài Pó (2023)
- Dìdi (2024)

== Awards and nominations ==
Award	Year	Category	Work	Result	Ref.
Academy Awards	2024	Best Documentary Short Film	Nǎi Nai & Wài Pó	Nominated	
AFI Fest	2023	Grand Jury Prize – Documentary Short	Nǎi Nai & Wài Pó	Won	
Austin Film Critics Association	2025	Best First Film	Dìdi	Nominated	
CineFest Miskolc International Film Festival	2024	Adolph Zukor Prize	Dìdi	Won	
Directors Guild of America Awards	2025	Outstanding Directorial Achievement in First-Time Theatrical Feature Film	Dìdi	Nominated	
Filmfest München	2024	CineKindl Audience Award	Dìdi	Won	
Hollywood Creative Alliance	2024	Best First Feature	Dìdi	Nominated	
Independent Spirit Awards	2025	Best First Feature	Dìdi	Won	
Independent Spirit Awards	2025	Best First Screenplay	Dìdi	Won	
International Documentary Association	2023	Best Short Documentary	Nǎi Nai & Wài Pó	Nominated	
San Diego Film Critics Society	2024	Best First Feature	Dìdi	Runner-up	
Seattle International Film Festival	2023	Documentary Short Grand Jury Prize	Nǎi Nai & Wài Pó	Won	
South by Southwest	2023	Grand Jury Award – Documentary Short Competition	Nǎi Nai & Wài Pó	Won	
South by Southwest	2023	Audience Award	Nǎi Nai & Wài Pó	Won	
Sundance Film Festival	2024	Audience Award: U.S. Dramatic	Dìdi	Won	
Sundance Film Festival	2025	Vanguard Award for Fiction	—N/a	Honored	
