= List of accolades received by Challengers (film) =

Accolades received by American film

Challengers accolades
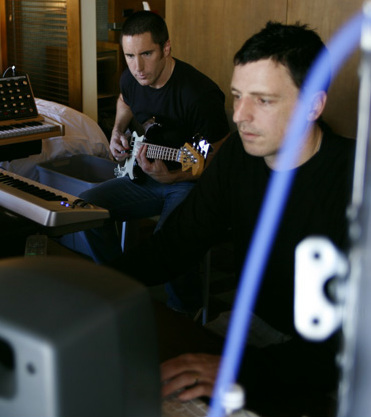
- Composers Trent Reznor (left) and Atticus Ross (right) received several accolades for their work on the film's musical score.
Accolades
| Award | Wins | Nominations |
| Alliance of Women Film Journalists Awards | 0 | 1 |
| American Cinema Editors Eddie Awards | 0 | 1 |
| Artios Awards | 0 | 1 |
| ASCAP Screen Music Awards | 1 | 1 |
| Astra Creative Arts Awards | 1 | 6 |
| Astra Film Awards | 1 | 3 |
| Astra Midseason Movie Awards | 2 | 6 |
| Austin Film Critics Association Awards | 0 | 2 |
| Black Reel Awards | 0 | 2 |
| Boston Society of Film Critics Awards | 1 | 1 |
| Chicago Film Critics Association Awards | 2 | 4 |
| Costume Designers Guild Awards | 0 | 1 |
| Critics' Choice Movie Awards | 2 | 4 |
| Dallas–Fort Worth Film Critics Association Awards | 1 | 1 |
| Dorian Awards | 2 | 6 |
| Florida Film Critics Circle Awards | 1 | 6 |
| Georgia Film Critics Association Awards | 2 | 4 |
| Golden Globe Awards | 1 | 4 |
| Gotham Awards | 1 | 2 |
| Grammy Awards | 0 | 1 |
| Hollywood Music in Media Awards | 0 | 2 |
| Houston Film Critics Society Awards | 1 | 2 |
| IndieWire Critics Poll | 4 | 4 |
| International Cinephile Society Awards | 2 | 5 |
| Kansas City Film Critics Circle Awards | 1 | 1 |
| London Film Critics Circle Awards | 0 | 1 |
| Los Angeles Film Critics Association Awards | 1 | 1 |
| NAACP Image Awards | 0 | 1 |
| Nastro d'Argento | 0 | 2 |
| New York Film Critics Online Awards | 0 | 1 |
| Online Film Critics Society Awards | 3 | 4 |
| Queerties | 1 | 2 |
| The ReFrame Stamp | 1 | 1 |
| San Diego Film Critics Society Awards | 3 | 4 |
| San Francisco Bay Area Film Critics Circle Awards | 0 | 2 |
| Seattle Film Critics Society Awards | 1 | 3 |
| Society of Composers & Lyricists Awards | 1 | 1 |
| St. Louis Film Critics Association Awards | 1 | 1 |
| Toronto Film Critics Association Awards | 1 | 1 |
| Washington D.C. Area Film Critics Association Awards | 1 | 2 |
| Women Film Critics Circle Awards | 1 | 1 |
| Writers Guild of America Awards | 0 | 1 |

Totals (Note: Certain award groups do not simply award one winner. They acknowledge several different recipients, have runners-up, and have third place. Since this is a specific recognition and is different from losing an award, runner-up mentions are considered wins in this award tally. For simplification and to avoid errors, each award in this list has been presumed to have had a prior nomination.)
- Wins: 41
- Nominations: 100

Challengers is a 2024 American sports film directed by Luca Guadagnino and written by Justin Kuritzkes. It follows a love triangle between an injured tennis star-turned-coach (Zendaya), her tennis player ex–boyfriend (Josh O'Connor), and her tennis champion husband (Mike Faist), spanning 13 years of their relationship and leading to a match between the two men on the ATP Challenger Tour.

The film premiered in Sydney, Australia, on March 26, 2024, and was theatrically released in the United States a month later by Amazon MGM Studios. Challengers earned $96 million in worldwide revenue against a production budget of $55 million. The film was met with critical acclaim, (Note: Attributed to multiple references:) with praise for its performances, (Note: Attributed to multiple references:) editing, (Note: Attributed to multiple references:) screenplay, (Note: Attributed to multiple references:) direction, (Note: Attributed to multiple references:) and musical score. (Note: Attributed to multiple references:) On the review aggregator website Rotten Tomatoes, Challengers holds an approval rating of 88% based on 380 reviews.

At the Golden Globe Awards, Challengers received four nominations including Best Motion Picture – Musical or Comedy, winning Best Original Score (Trent Reznor and Atticus Ross). It garnered fifteen nominations at the Astra Awards, winning Best Comedy or Musical at the Astra Film Awards, Best Film Editing (Marco Costa) at the Astra Creative Arts Awards, and Best Actress (Zendaya) and Best Screenplay (Kuritzkes) at the Astra Midseason Movie Awards. Challengers received several other nominations, including six Dorian Awards (two wins), four Critics' Choice Movie Awards (two wins), and two Gotham Awards (one win). The film also received the ReFrame Stamp and a Women Film Critics Circle Award for its gender-balanced production. Reznor and Ross garnered awards for their work on the musical score at the Critics' Choice Movie Awards and the Dorian Awards, as well as nominations at the Grammy Awards, the Hollywood Music in Media Awards, and the NAACP Image Awards. Zendaya received a nomination for the Golden Globe Award for Best Actress in a Motion Picture – Musical or Comedy.

== Accolades ==
Accolades received by Challengers (film)
| Award | Date of ceremony | Category | Recipient(s) | Result | Ref(s). |
|---|---|---|---|---|---|
| Alliance of Women Film Journalists Awards | January 7, 2025 | Best Ensemble Cast and Casting Director | Challengers | Nominated | |
| American Cinema Editors Eddie Awards | March 14, 2025 | Best Edited Feature Film – Comedy or Musical | Marco Costa | Nominated | |
| Artios Awards | February 12, 2025 | Outstanding Achievement in Casting – Big Budget Feature (Comedy) | Francine Maisler and Molly Rose | Nominated | |
| ASCAP Screen Music Awards | April 30, 2025 | Film Score of the Year | Trent Reznor | Won | |
| Astra Creative Arts Awards | December 8, 2024 | Best Cinematography | Sayombhu Mukdeeprom | Nominated | |
| Astra Creative Arts Awards | December 8, 2024 | Best Film Editing | Marco Costa | Won | |
| Astra Creative Arts Awards | December 8, 2024 | Best Marketing Campaign | Challengers | Nominated | |
| Astra Creative Arts Awards | December 8, 2024 | Best Original Score | Trent Reznor and Atticus Ross | Nominated | |
| Astra Creative Arts Awards | December 8, 2024 | Best Original Song | "Compress/Repress" (Trent Reznor and Atticus Ross) | Nominated | |
| Astra Creative Arts Awards | December 8, 2024 | Best Sound | Challengers | Nominated | |
| Astra Film Awards | December 8, 2024 | Best Picture | Challengers | Nominated | |
| Astra Film Awards | December 8, 2024 | Best Comedy or Musical | Challengers | Won | |
| Astra Film Awards | December 8, 2024 | Best Original Screenplay | Justin Kuritzkes | Nominated | |
| Astra Midseason Movie Awards | July 3, 2024 | Best Picture | Challengers | Nominated | |
| Astra Midseason Movie Awards | July 3, 2024 | Best Director | Luca Guadagnino | Nominated | |
| Astra Midseason Movie Awards | July 3, 2024 | Best Actor | Josh O'Connor | Nominated | |
| Astra Midseason Movie Awards | July 3, 2024 | Best Actress | Zendaya | Won | |
| Astra Midseason Movie Awards | July 3, 2024 | Best Supporting Actor | Mike Faist | Nominated | |
| Astra Midseason Movie Awards | July 3, 2024 | Best Screenplay | Justin Kuritzkes | Won | |
| Austin Film Critics Association Awards | January 6, 2025 | Best Original Screenplay | Justin Kuritzkes | Nominated | |
| Austin Film Critics Association Awards | January 6, 2025 | Best Original Score | Trent Reznor and Atticus Ross | Nominated | |
| Black Reel Awards | February 17, 2025 | Outstanding Film | Challengers (Luca Guadagnino, Amy Pascal, Zendaya, and Rachel O'Connor) | Nominated | |
| Black Reel Awards | February 17, 2025 | Outstanding Lead Performance | Zendaya | Nominated | |
| Boston Society of Film Critics Awards | December 8, 2024 | Best Editing | Marco Costa | Won | |
| Chicago Film Critics Association Awards | December 11, 2024 | Best Original Screenplay | Justin Kuritzkes | Nominated | |
| Chicago Film Critics Association Awards | December 11, 2024 | Best Cinematography | Sayombhu Mukdeeprom | Nominated | |
| Chicago Film Critics Association Awards | December 11, 2024 | Best Editing | Marco Costa | Won | |
| Chicago Film Critics Association Awards | December 11, 2024 | Best Original Score | Trent Reznor and Atticus Ross | Won | |
| Costume Designers Guild Awards | February 6, 2025 | Excellence in Contemporary Film | Jonathan Anderson | Nominated | |
| Critics' Choice Movie Awards | February 7, 2025 | Best Original Screenplay | Justin Kuritzkes | Nominated | |
| Critics' Choice Movie Awards | February 7, 2025 | Best Editing | Marco Costa | Won | |
| Critics' Choice Movie Awards | February 7, 2025 | Best Score | Trent Reznor and Atticus Ross | Won | |
| Critics' Choice Movie Awards | February 7, 2025 | Best Song | "Compress/Repress" (Luca Guadagnino, Trent Reznor, and Atticus Ross) | Nominated | |
| Dallas–Fort Worth Film Critics Association Awards | December 18, 2024 | Best Musical Score | Trent Reznor and Atticus Ross | Runner-up | |
| Dorian Awards | February 13, 2025 | Film of the Year | Challengers | Nominated | |
| Dorian Awards | February 13, 2025 | LGBTQ Film of the Year | Challengers | Nominated | |
| Dorian Awards | February 13, 2025 | Director of the Year | Luca Guadagnino | Nominated | |
| Dorian Awards | February 13, 2025 | Screenplay of the Year | Justin Kuritzkes | Won | |
| Dorian Awards | February 13, 2025 | LGBTQ Screenplay of the Year | Justin Kuritzkes | Nominated | |
| Dorian Awards | February 13, 2025 | Film Music of the Year | Trent Reznor and Atticus Ross | Won | |
| Florida Film Critics Circle Awards | December 20, 2024 | Best Actor | Josh O'Connor | Nominated | |
| Florida Film Critics Circle Awards | December 20, 2024 | Best Ensemble | Challengers | Nominated | |
| Florida Film Critics Circle Awards | December 20, 2024 | Best Director | Luca Guadagnino | Nominated | |
| Florida Film Critics Circle Awards | December 20, 2024 | Best Original Screenplay | Justin Kuritzkes | Nominated | |
| Florida Film Critics Circle Awards | December 20, 2024 | Best Cinematography | Sayombhu Mukdeeprom | Nominated | |
| Florida Film Critics Circle Awards | December 20, 2024 | Best Original Score | Trent Reznor and Atticus Ross | Won | |
| Georgia Film Critics Association Awards | January 7, 2025 | Best Picture | Challengers | Nominated | |
| Georgia Film Critics Association Awards | January 7, 2025 | Best Original Screenplay | Justin Kuritzkes | Nominated | |
| Georgia Film Critics Association Awards | January 7, 2025 | Best Original Score | Trent Reznor and Atticus Ross | Won | |
| Georgia Film Critics Association Awards | January 7, 2025 | Best Original Song | "Compress/Repress" (Trent Reznor and Atticus Ross) | Won | |
| Golden Globe Awards | January 5, 2025 | Best Motion Picture – Musical or Comedy | Challengers | Nominated | |
| Golden Globe Awards | January 5, 2025 | Best Actress in a Motion Picture – Musical or Comedy | Zendaya | Nominated | |
| Golden Globe Awards | January 5, 2025 | Best Original Score | Trent Reznor and Atticus Ross | Won | |
| Golden Globe Awards | January 5, 2025 | Best Original Song | "Compress/Repress" (Luca Guadagnino, Trent Reznor, and Atticus Ross) | Nominated | |
| Gotham Awards | December 2, 2024 | Best Feature | Challengers | Nominated | |
| Gotham Awards | December 2, 2024 | Spotlight Tribute Award | Zendaya | Won | |
| Grammy Awards | February 2, 2025 | Best Score Soundtrack for Visual Media | Trent Reznor and Atticus Ross | Nominated | |
| Hollywood Music in Media Awards | November 20, 2024 | Best Original Score in a Feature Film | Trent Reznor and Atticus Ross | Nominated | |
| Hollywood Music in Media Awards | November 20, 2024 | Best Original Song in a Feature Film | "Compress/Repress" (Luca Guadagnino, Trent Reznor, Atticus Ross, and Mariqueen Maandig) | Nominated | |
| Houston Film Critics Society Awards | January 14, 2025 | Best Original Score | Trent Reznor and Atticus Ross | Won | |
| Houston Film Critics Society Awards | January 14, 2025 | Best Original Song | "Compress/Repress" | Nominated | |
| IndieWire Critics Poll | December 16, 2024 | Best Film | Challengers | 5th Place | |
| IndieWire Critics Poll | December 16, 2024 | Best Director | Luca Guadagnino | 5th Place | |
| IndieWire Critics Poll | December 16, 2024 | Best Screenplay | Luca Guadagnino | 4th Place | |
| IndieWire Critics Poll | December 16, 2024 | Best Cinematography | Sayombhu Mukdeeprom | 5th Place | |
| International Cinephile Society Awards | February 9, 2025 | Best Picture | Challengers | 15th Place | |
| International Cinephile Society Awards | February 9, 2025 | Best Original Screenplay | Justin Kuritzkes | Nominated | |
| International Cinephile Society Awards | February 9, 2025 | Best Editing | Marco Costa | Nominated | |
| International Cinephile Society Awards | February 9, 2025 | Best Score | Trent Reznor and Atticus Ross | Runner-up | |
| International Cinephile Society Awards | February 9, 2025 | Best Sound Design | Craig Berkey and Paul Carter | Nominated | |
| Kansas City Film Critics Circle Awards | January 4, 2025 | Best Original Score | Trent Reznor and Atticus Ross | Won | |
| London Film Critics Circle Awards | February 2, 2025 | British/Irish Performer of the Year | Josh O'Connor | Nominated (Note: Also for Lee and La chimera) | |
| Los Angeles Film Critics Association Awards | December 8, 2024 | Best Music | Trent Reznor and Atticus Ross | Won | |
| NAACP Image Awards | February 22, 2025 | Outstanding Original Score for Television or Motion Picture | Trent Reznor and Atticus Ross | Nominated | |
| Nastro d'Argento | June 27, 2024 | Best Director | Luca Guadagnino | Nominated | |
| Nastro d'Argento | June 27, 2024 | Best Editing | Marco Costa | Nominated | |
| New York Film Critics Online Awards | December 16, 2024 | Best Use of Music | Challengers | Nominated | |
| Online Film Critics Society Awards | January 27, 2025 | Best Picture | Challengers | 4th Place | |
| Online Film Critics Society Awards | January 27, 2025 | Best Original Screenplay | Justin Kuritzkes | Nominated | |
| Online Film Critics Society Awards | January 27, 2025 | Best Editing | Marco Costa | Won | |
| Online Film Critics Society Awards | January 27, 2025 | Best Original Score | Trent Reznor and Atticus Ross | Won | |
| Queerties | March 12, 2024 | Next Big Thing | Challengers | Nominated | |
| Queerties | March 11, 2025 | Best Comedy Movie | Challengers | Runner-up | |
| The ReFrame Stamp | March 26, 2025 | Gender-Balanced Production | Challengers | Won | |
| San Diego Film Critics Society Awards | December 9, 2024 | Best Picture | Challengers | Nominated | |
| San Diego Film Critics Society Awards | December 9, 2024 | Best Original Screenplay | Justin Kuritzkes | Runner-up | |
| San Diego Film Critics Society Awards | December 9, 2024 | Best Editing | Marco Costa | Runner-up | |
| San Diego Film Critics Society Awards | December 9, 2024 | Best Use of Music | Challengers | Runner-up | |
| San Francisco Bay Area Film Critics Circle Awards | December 15, 2024 | Best Film Editing | Marco Costa | Nominated | |
| San Francisco Bay Area Film Critics Circle Awards | December 15, 2024 | Best Original Score | Trent Reznor and Atticus Ross | Nominated | |
| Seattle Film Critics Society Awards | December 16, 2024 | Best Picture | Challengers (Luca Guadagnino) | Nominated | |
| Seattle Film Critics Society Awards | December 16, 2024 | Best Supporting Actor | Josh O'Connor | Nominated | |
| Seattle Film Critics Society Awards | December 16, 2024 | Best Original Score | Trent Reznor and Atticus Ross | Won | |
| Society of Composers & Lyricists Awards | February 12, 2025 | Outstanding Original Song for a Comedy or Musical Visual Media Production | "Compress/Repress" (Luca Guadagnino, Trent Reznor, and Atticus Ross) | Won | |
| St. Louis Film Critics Association Awards | December 15, 2024 | Best Original Score | Trent Reznor and Atticus Ross | Runner-up | |
| Toronto Film Critics Association Awards | December 15, 2024 | Best Original Screenplay | Justin Kuritzkes | Runner-up | |
| Washington D.C. Area Film Critics Association Awards | December 8, 2024 | Best Original Screenplay | Justin Kuritzkes | Nominated | |
| Washington D.C. Area Film Critics Association Awards | December 8, 2024 | Best Original Score | Trent Reznor and Atticus Ross | Won | |
| Women Film Critics Circle Awards | January 15, 2025 | Best Equality of the Sexes | Challengers | Won | |
| Writers Guild of America Awards | February 15, 2025 | Best Original Screenplay | Justin Kuritzkes | Nominated | |
