= Colt Seavers =

Colt Seavers is the name of a fictional character appearing in:

- The Fall Guy, a television series originally broadcast from 1981 to 1986
- The Fall Guy (2024 film), an American action comedy film loosely based on the TV series
