= 7th Astra Midseason Movie Awards =

Astra Midseason Movie Awards

- Date: July 3, 2024
- Official website: theastras.com

Highlights
- Best Picture: Dune: Part Two
- Most awards: Dune: Part Two (3)
- Most nominations: Dune: Part Two (7)

The winners of the 7th Astra Midseason Movie Awards, presented by the Hollywood Creative Alliance, were announced on July 3, 2024, on the association's official Twitter page. This year's ceremony were the first midseason awards to be presented under the awards' new name: "The Astra Awards".

The nominations were announced on July 1, 2024. The epic science fiction film Dune: Part Two led the nominations with seven, followed by Challengers, Civil War and The Fall Guy with six each; Furiosa: A Mad Max Saga and I Saw the TV Glow received five nominations each.

Dune: Part Two received the most awards with three wins, including Best Picture and Best Director (Denis Villeneuve), followed by Challengers and Love Lies Bleeding with two wins each.

All films considered and nominated were released between January 1 and June 30, 2024.

== Winners and nominees ==
Winners are listed first and highlighted with boldface

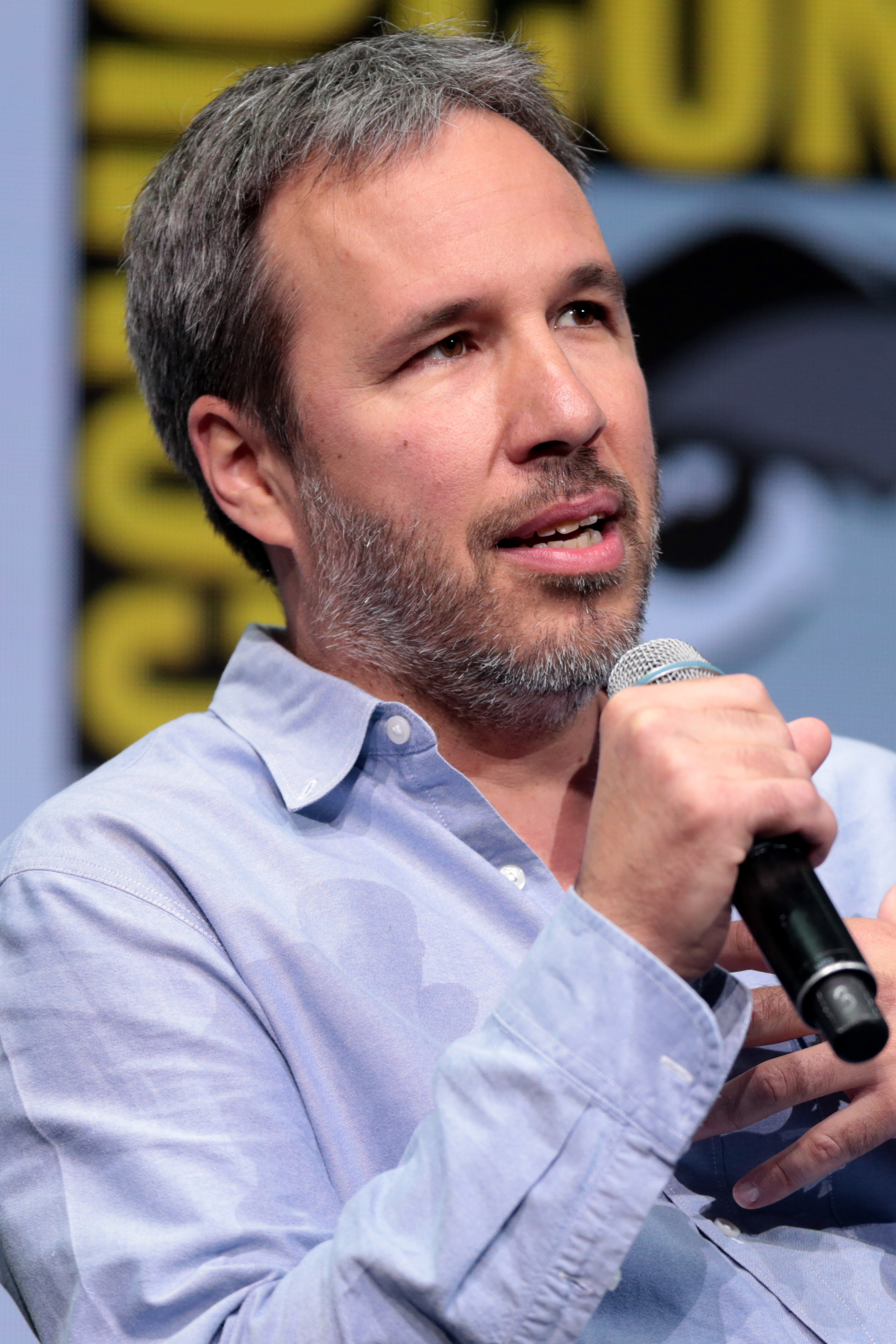
Denis Villeneuve, Best Director winner

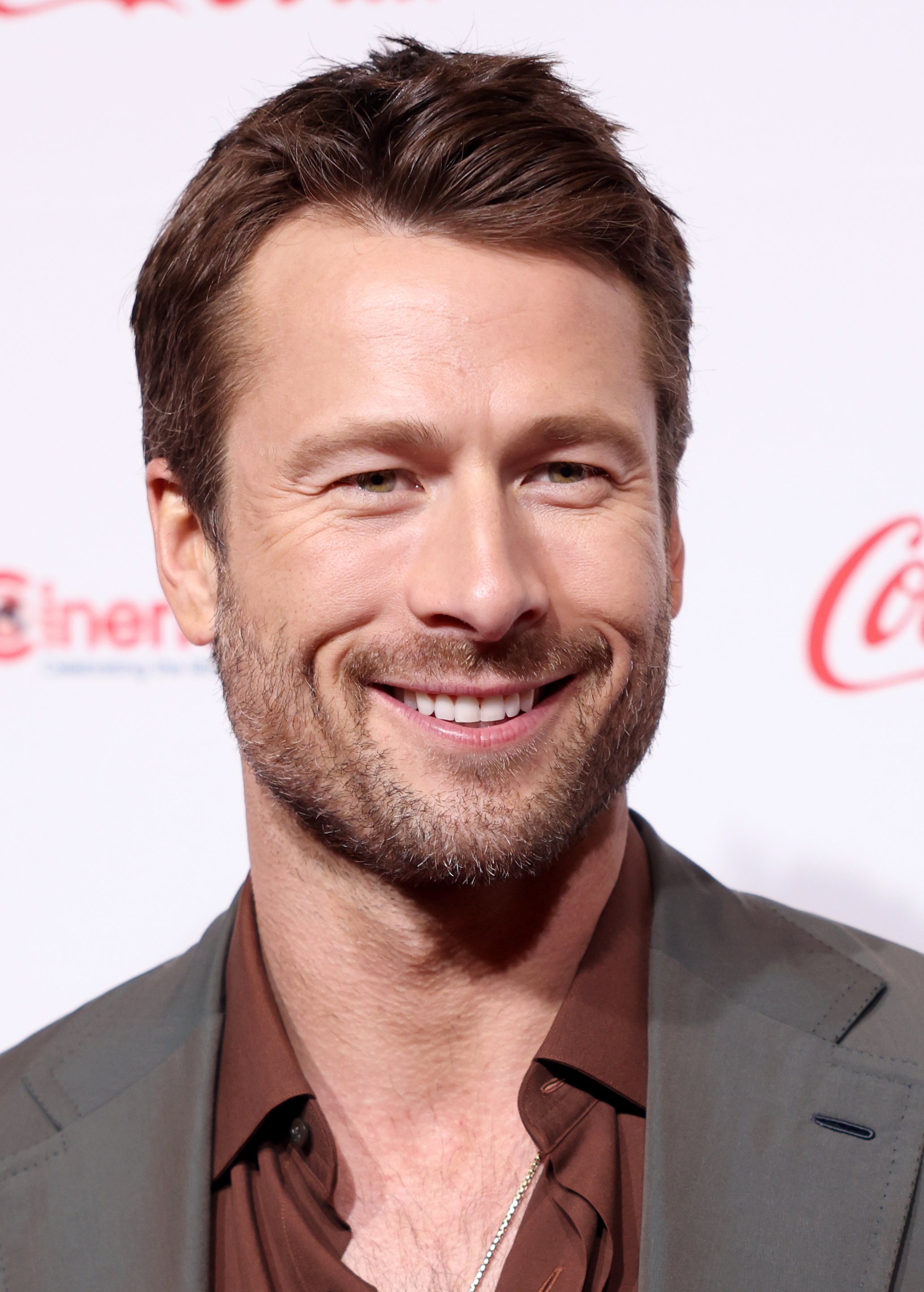
Glen Powell, Best Actor winner

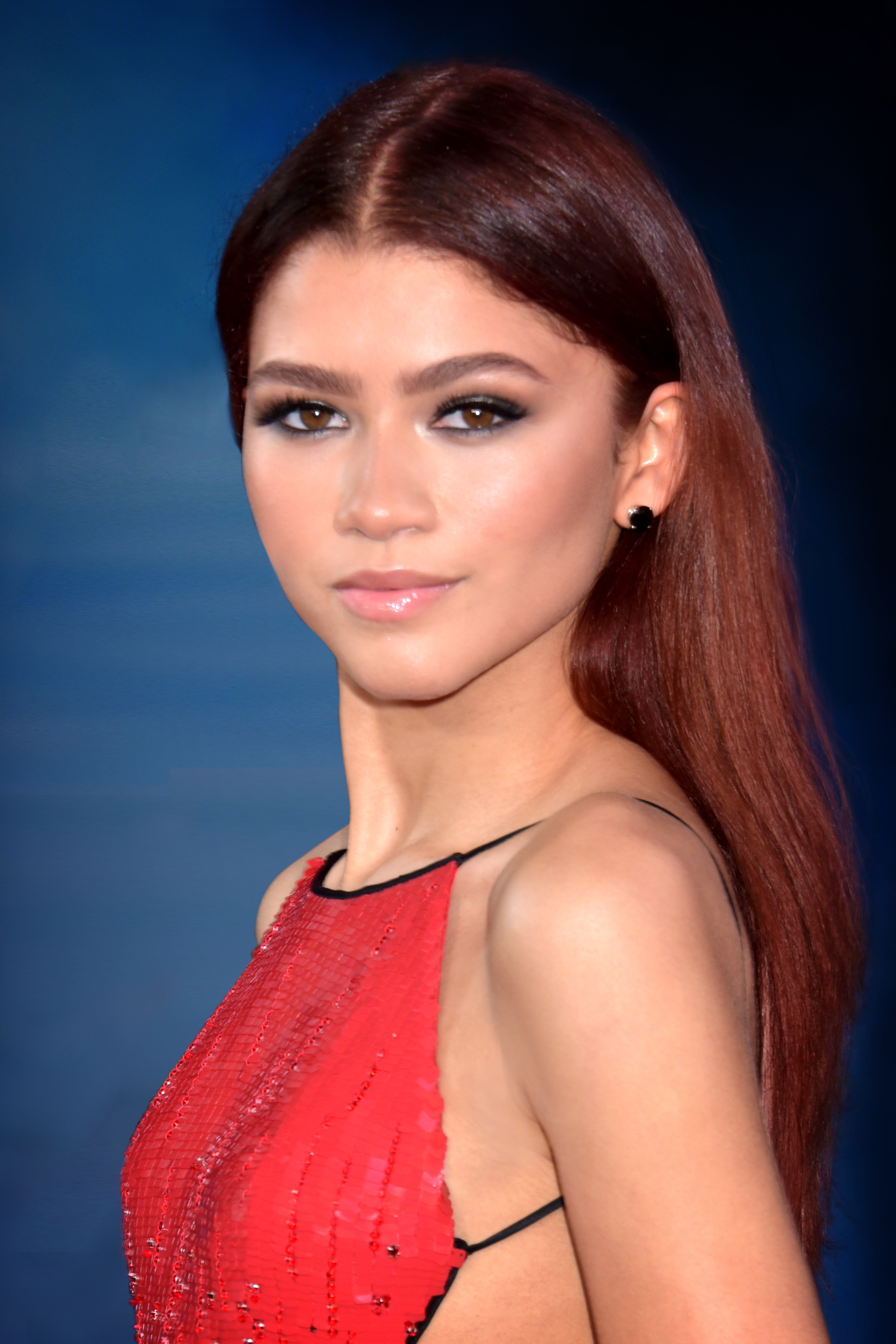
Zendaya, Best Actress winner

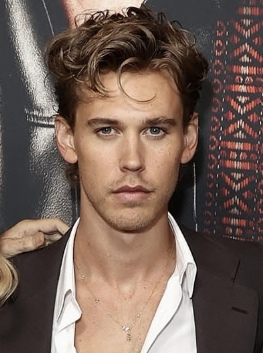
Austin Butler, Best Supporting Actor winner

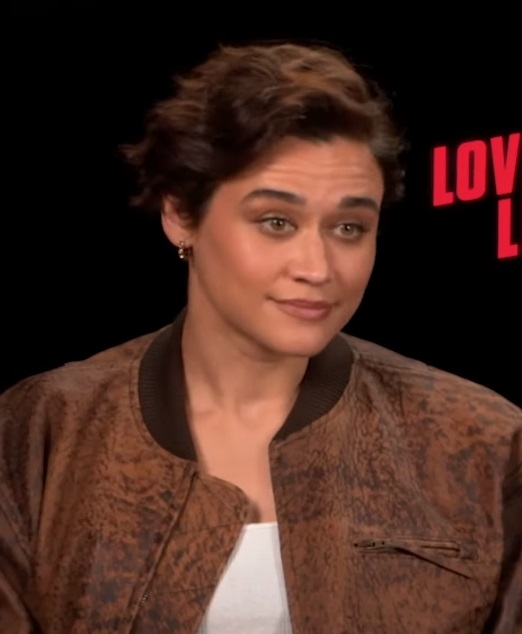
Katy O'Brian, Best Supporting Actress winner

**Best Picture**: **Dune: Part Two**; Runner-up: The Fall Guy; Challengers; Civil War; Furiosa: A Mad Max Saga; Hit Man; I Saw the TV Glow; Inside Out 2; Kingdom of the Planet of the Apes; Love Lies Bleeding	**Best Director**: **Denis Villeneuve – Dune: Part Two**; Runner-up: David Leitch – The Fall Guy; Alex Garland – Civil War; George Miller – Furiosa: A Mad Max Saga; Luca Guadagnino – Challengers
**Best Actor**: **Glen Powell – Hit Man as Gary Johnson**; Runner-up: Ryan Gosling – The Fall Guy as Colt Seavers; Josh O'Connor – Challengers as Patrick Zweig; Justice Smith – I Saw the TV Glow as Owen; Timothée Chalamet – Dune: Part Two as Paul Atreides	**Best Actress**: **Zendaya – Challengers as Tashi Duncan**; Runner-up: Anya Taylor-Joy – Furiosa: A Mad Max Saga as Furiosa; Emily Blunt – The Fall Guy as Jody Moreno; Kirsten Dunst – Civil War as Lee Smith; Kristen Stewart – Love Lies Bleeding as Louise "Lou" Langston
**Best Supporting Actor**: **Austin Butler – Dune: Part Two as Feyd-Rautha**; Runner-up: Jesse Plemons – Civil War as Soldier; Chris Hemsworth – Furiosa: A Mad Max Saga as Dementus; Jack Haven – I Saw the TV Glow as Maddy; Mike Faist – Challengers as Art Donaldson	**Best Supporting Actress**: **Katy O'Brian – Love Lies Bleeding as Jaqueline "Jackie" Cleaver**; Runner-up: Adria Arjona – Hit Man as Madison Figueroa Masters; Cailee Spaeny – Civil War as Jessie Cullen; Hannah Waddingham – The Fall Guy as Gail Meyer; Rebecca Ferguson – Dune: Part Two as Lady Jessica
**Best Screenplay**: **Justin Kuritzkes – Challengers**; Runner-up: Glen Powell and Richard Linklater – Hit Man; Alex Garland – Civil War; Denis Villeneuve and Jon Spaihts – Dune: Part Two; Jane Schoenbrun – I Saw the TV Glow	**Best Horror**: **A Quiet Place: Day One**; Runner-up: Late Night with the Devil; Abigail; Immaculate; The First Omen
**Best Indie**: **Love Lies Bleeding**; Runner-up: Late Night with the Devil; Hundreds of Beavers; I Saw the TV Glow; Thelma	**Best Stunts**: **The Fall Guy**; Runner-up: Furiosa: A Mad Max Saga; Bad Boys: Ride or Die; Dune: Part Two; Monkey Man
**Most Anticipated Film**: **Joker: Folie à Deux**; Runner-up: Deadpool & Wolverine; Alien: Romulus; Beetlejuice Beetlejuice; Wicked

== Films with multiple wins ==
The following films received multiple awards:

Wins	Film
3	Dune: Part Two
2	Challengers
2	Love Lies Bleeding

== Films with multiple nominations ==
The following films received multiple nominations:

Nominations	Film
7	Dune: Part Two
6	Challengers
6	Civil War
6	The Fall Guy
5	Furiosa: A Mad Max Saga
5	I Saw the TV Glow
4	Hit Man
4	Love Lies Bleeding
2	Late Night with the Devil

== See also ==
- 4th Astra TV Awards
- 8th Astra Film Awards
- 3rd Astra Creative Arts Awards
