= 8th Astra Film Awards =

Astra Film Awards

- Date: December 8, 2024
- Site: Taglyan Complex, Los Angeles
- Hosted by: Loni Love
- Official website: theastras.com

Highlights
- Best Picture: Wicked
- Most awards: Wicked (4)
- Most nominations: Wicked (8)

Television coverage
- Network: KNEKT Television Network; YouTube (@TheAstraAwards)

The 8th Astra Film Awards, presented by the Hollywood Creative Alliance, took place on December 8, 2024, at the Taglyan Complex in Los Angeles. The nominations were announced on November 25, 2024.

The body horror film The Substance and the musical fantasy Wicked led the nominations with eight each, followed by Emilia Pérez with seven and Anora with six. Wicked ultimately won the most awards with four, including Best Picture and Best Director (Jon M. Chu).

The nominees for the Creative Arts Awards were announced on the same day as the Film Award nominees, with its winners also announced on December 8. Both ceremonies, along with the Astra TV Awards, were recorded and streamed live on KNEKT.tv and YouTube. Comedian Loni Love hosted the Astra Film Awards, while actor and comedian Peter Kim hosted the Astra Creative Arts Awards.

== Ceremony information ==
This is the second ceremony following the rebranding to "The Astra Awards" by the Hollywood Creative Alliance. For the genre categories, "Best Performance in a Horror or Thriller" was introduced while "Best Action Feature" was expanded to include science fiction, "Best Comedy Feature" was expanded to include musicals, and "Best Horror Feature" was expanded to include thrillers.

Three international-centric categories (Best International Filmmaker, Best International Actor, and Best International Actress) were all discontinued, following their debut at the previous ceremony.

== Winners and nominees ==
Winners are listed first and highlighted with boldface.

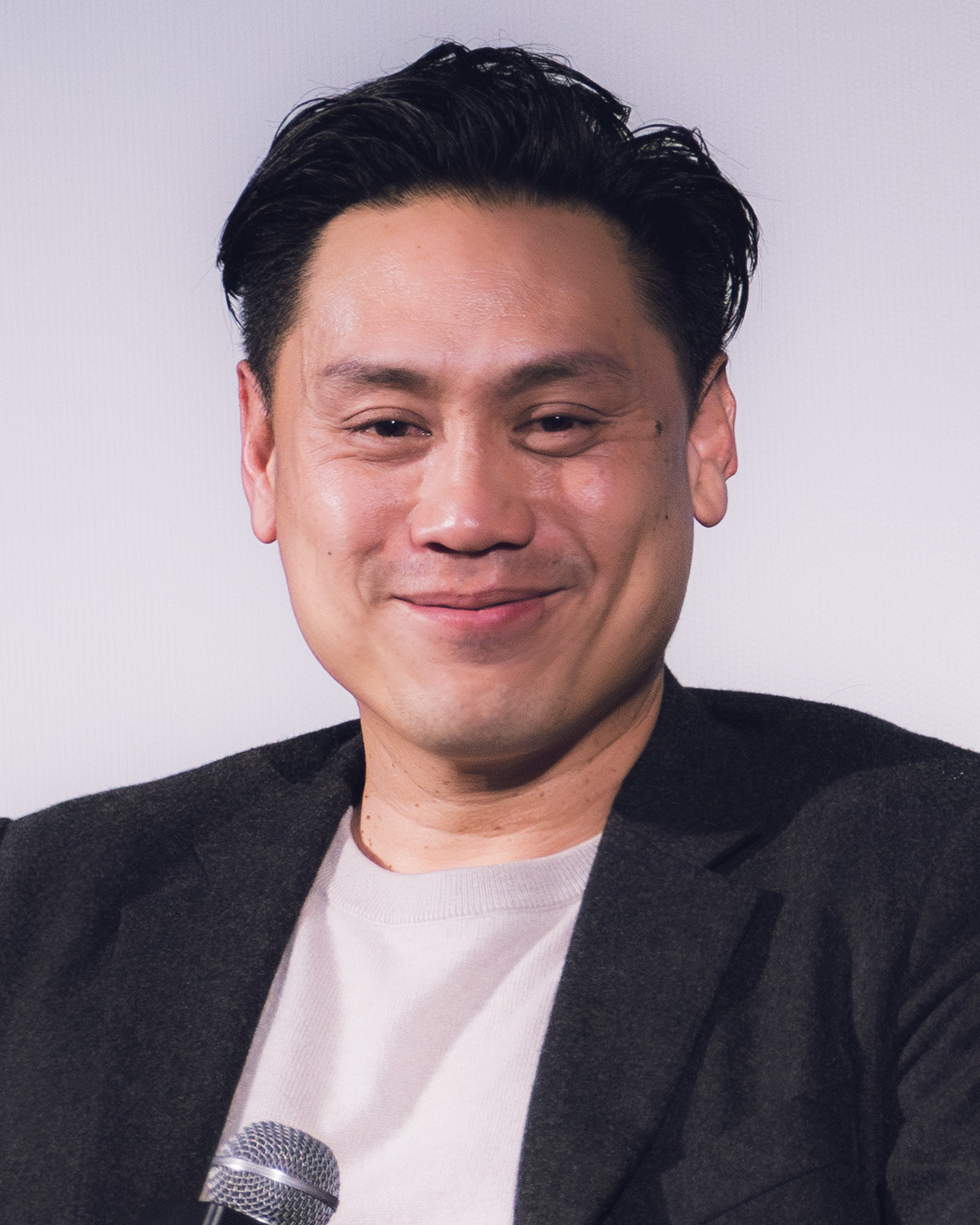
Jon M. Chu, Best Director winner

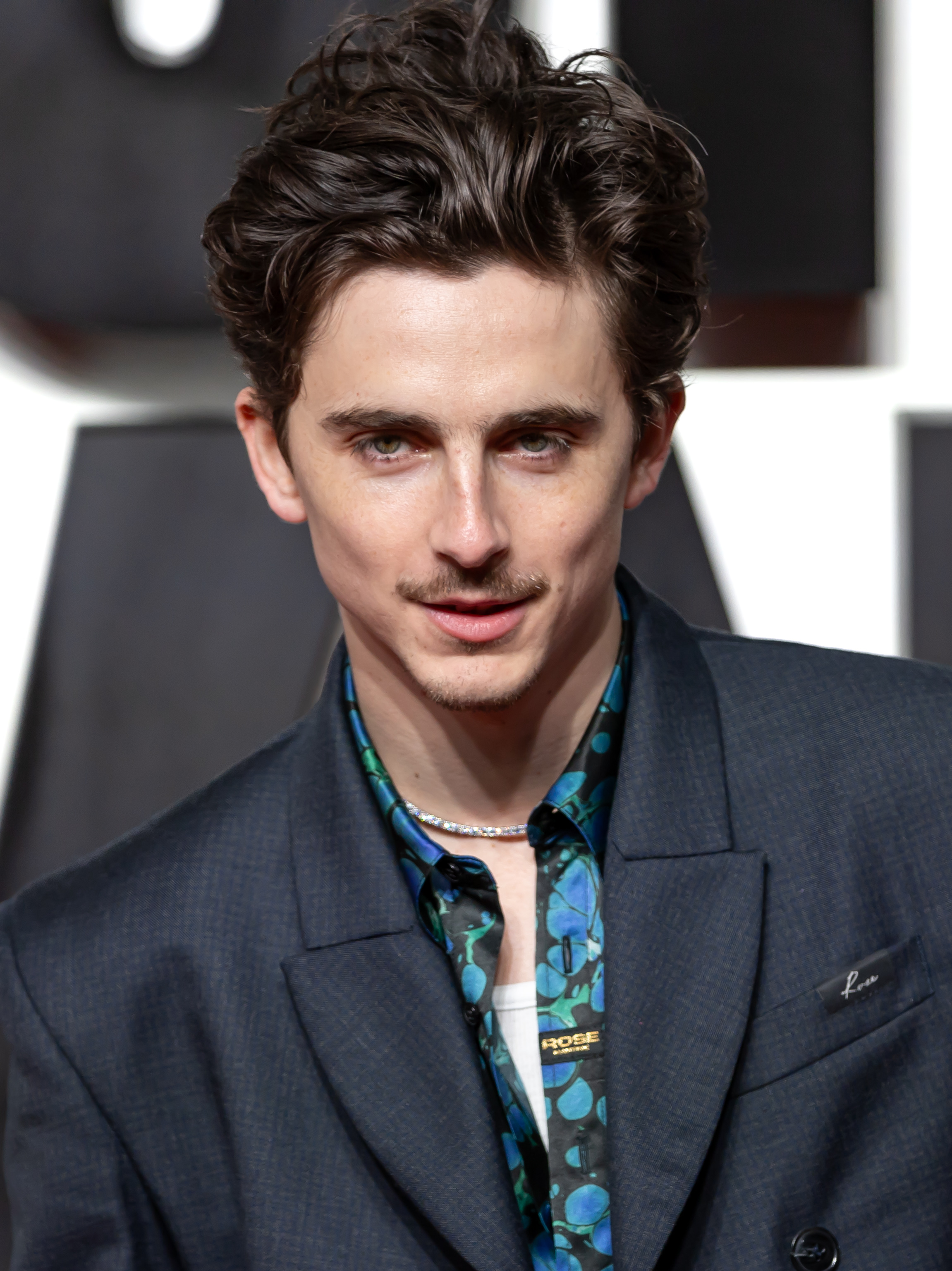
Timothée Chalamet, Best Actor winner

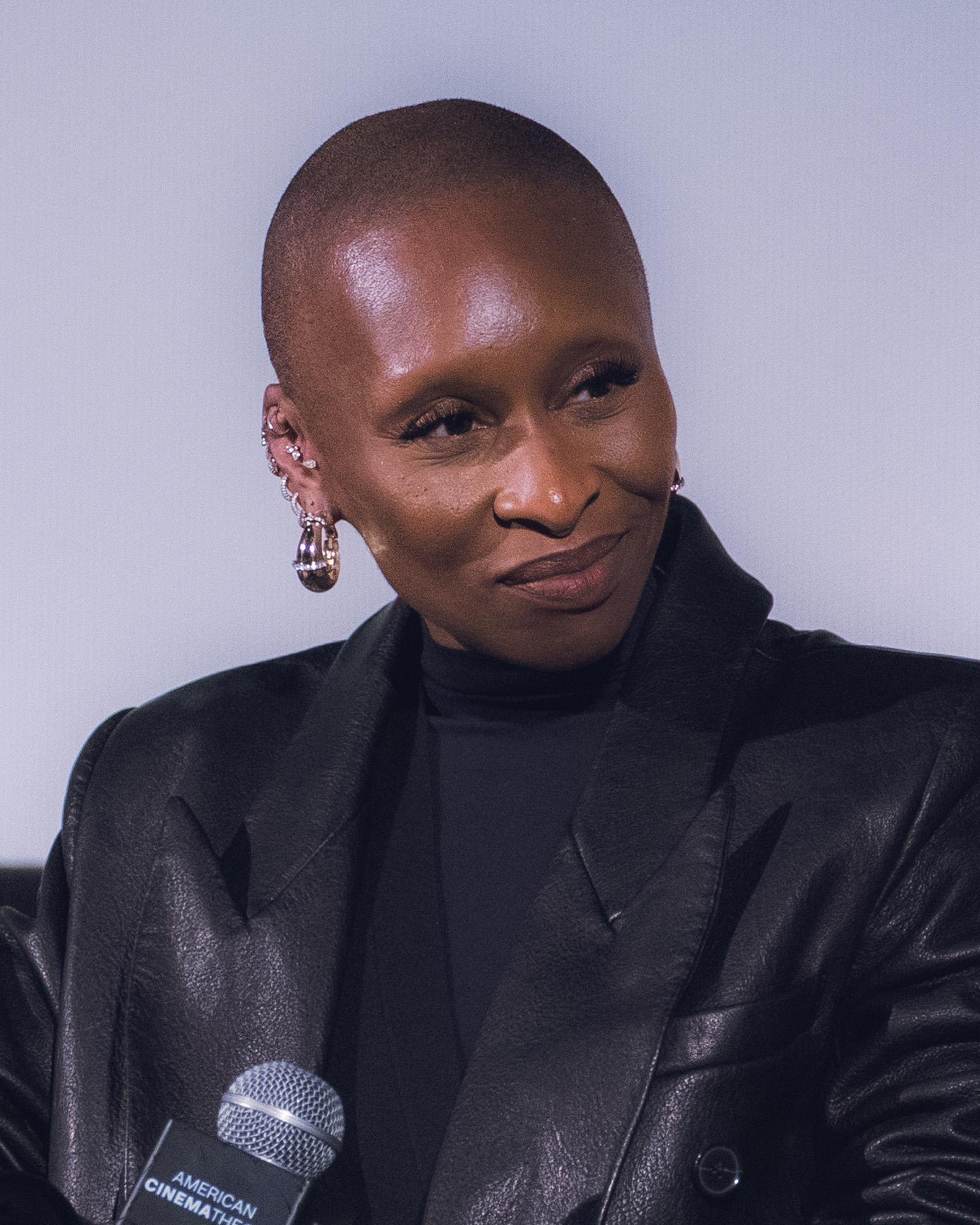
Cynthia Erivo, Best Actress winner

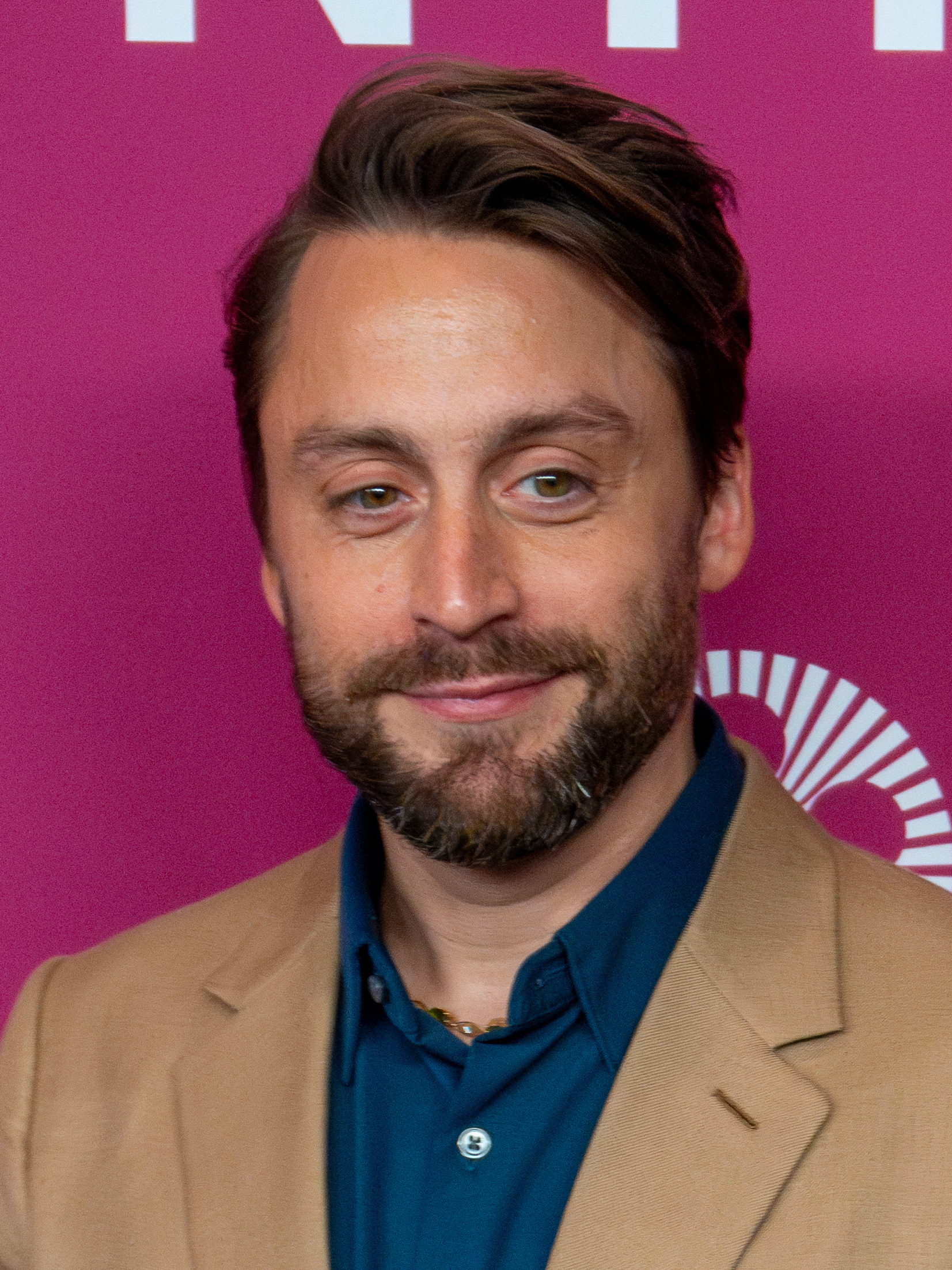
Kieran Culkin, Best Supporting Actor winner

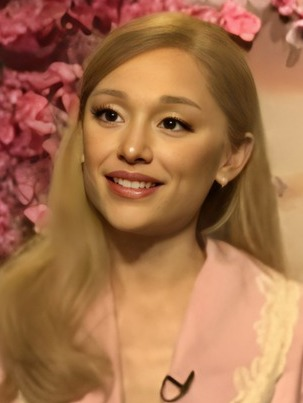
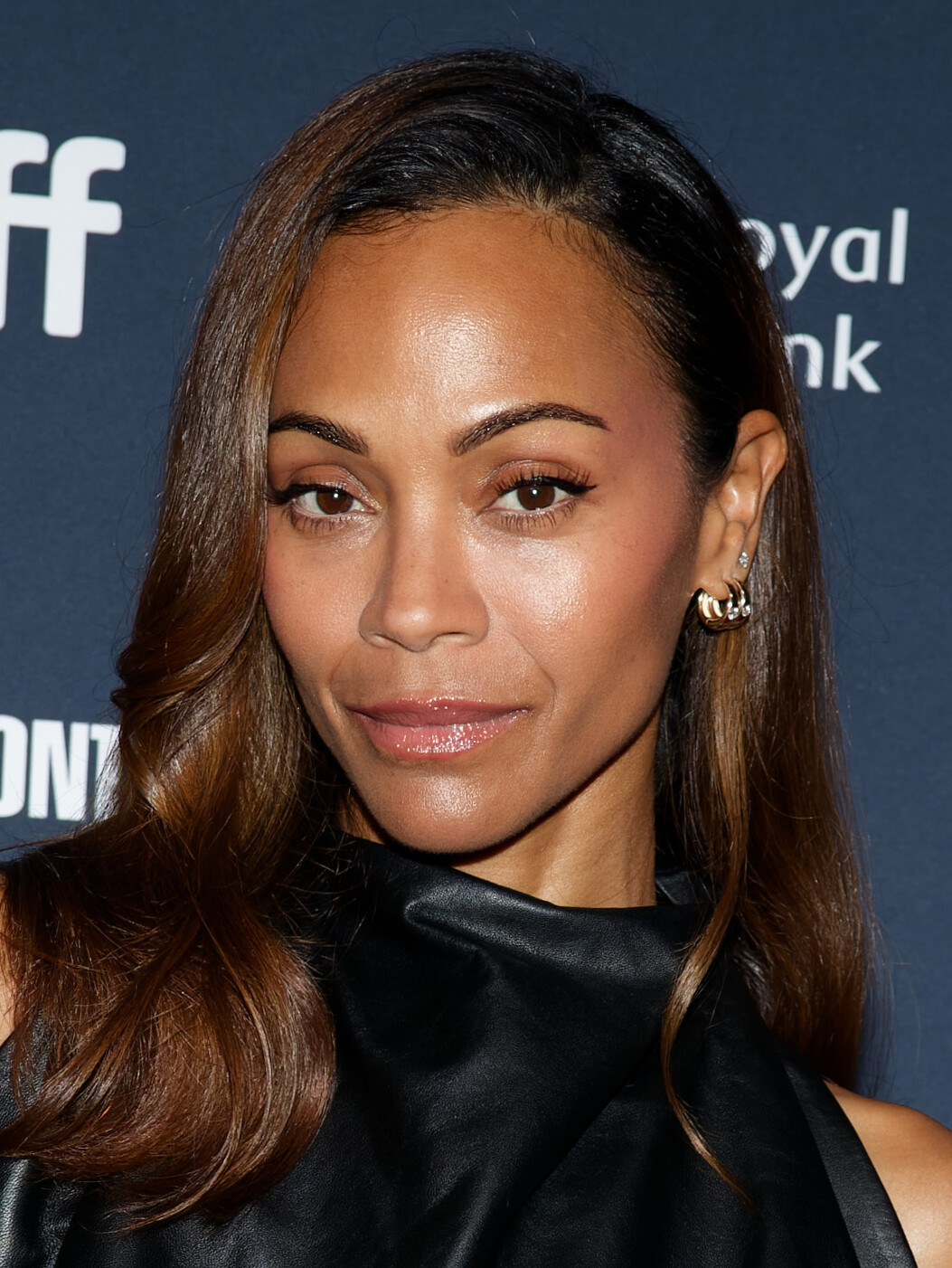
Ariana Grande and Zoe Saldaña, Best Supporting Actress winners

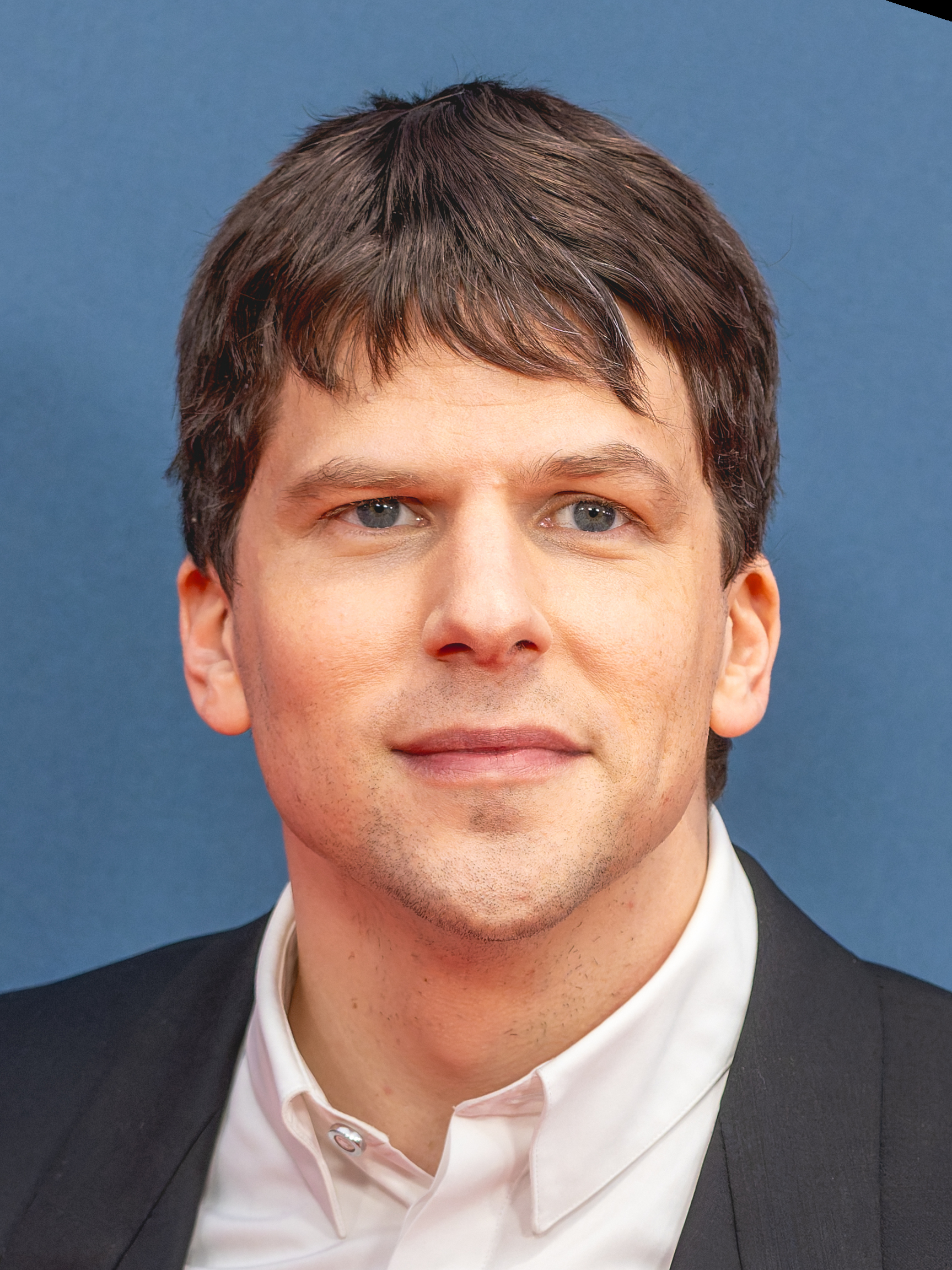
Jesse Eisenberg, Best Original Screenplay winner

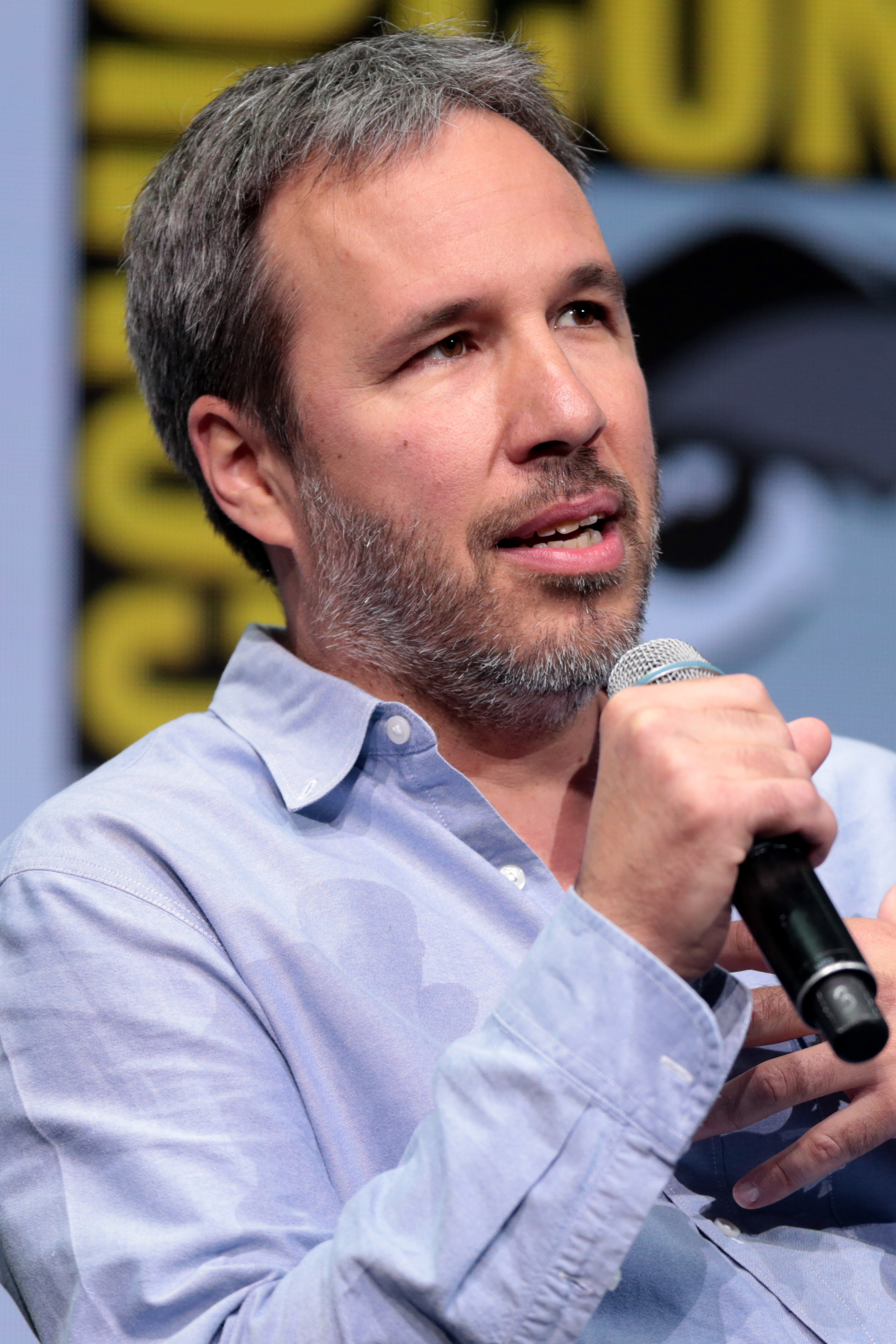
Denis Villeneuve, Best Adapted Screenplay co-winner

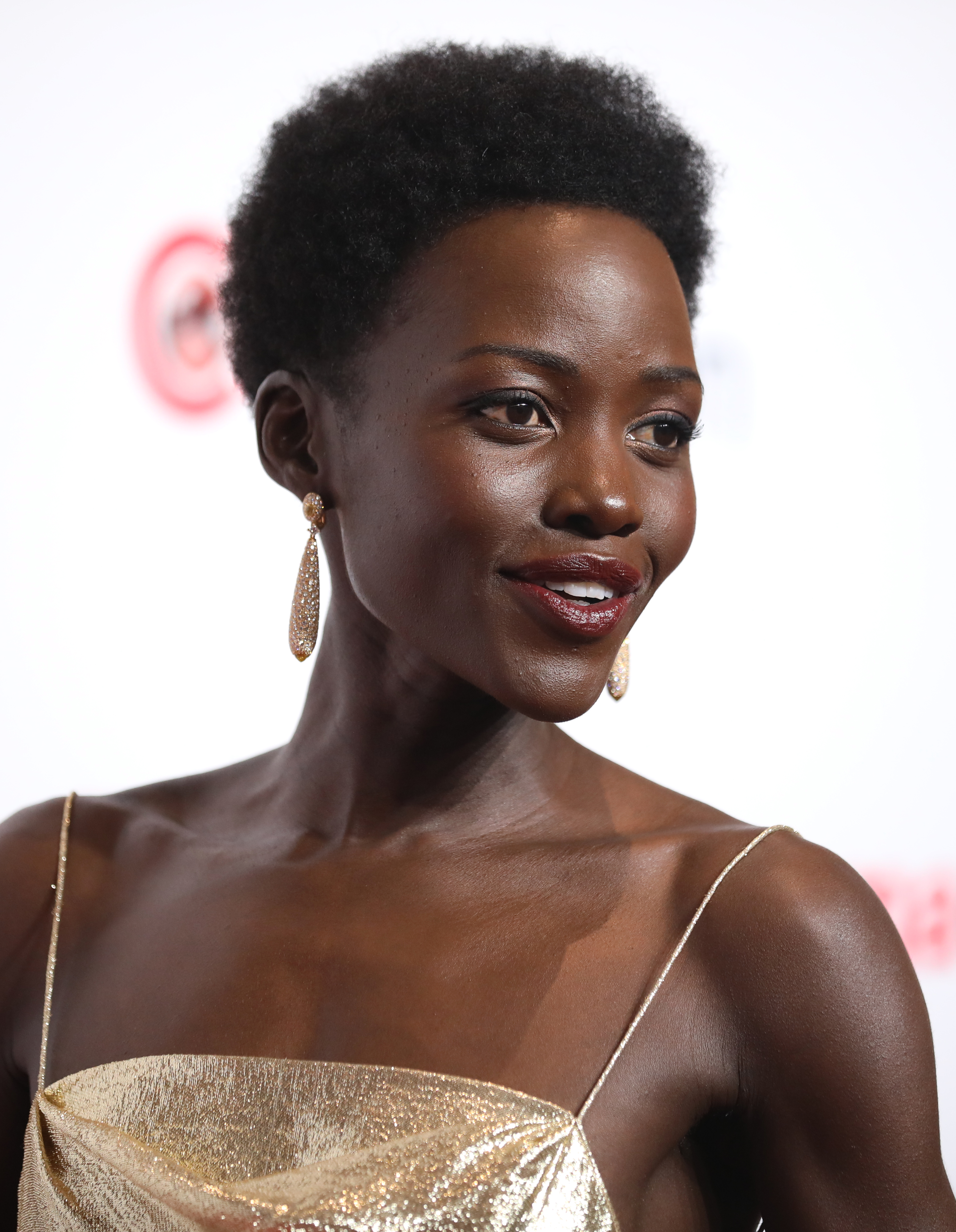
Lupita Nyong'o, Best Voice Over Performance winner

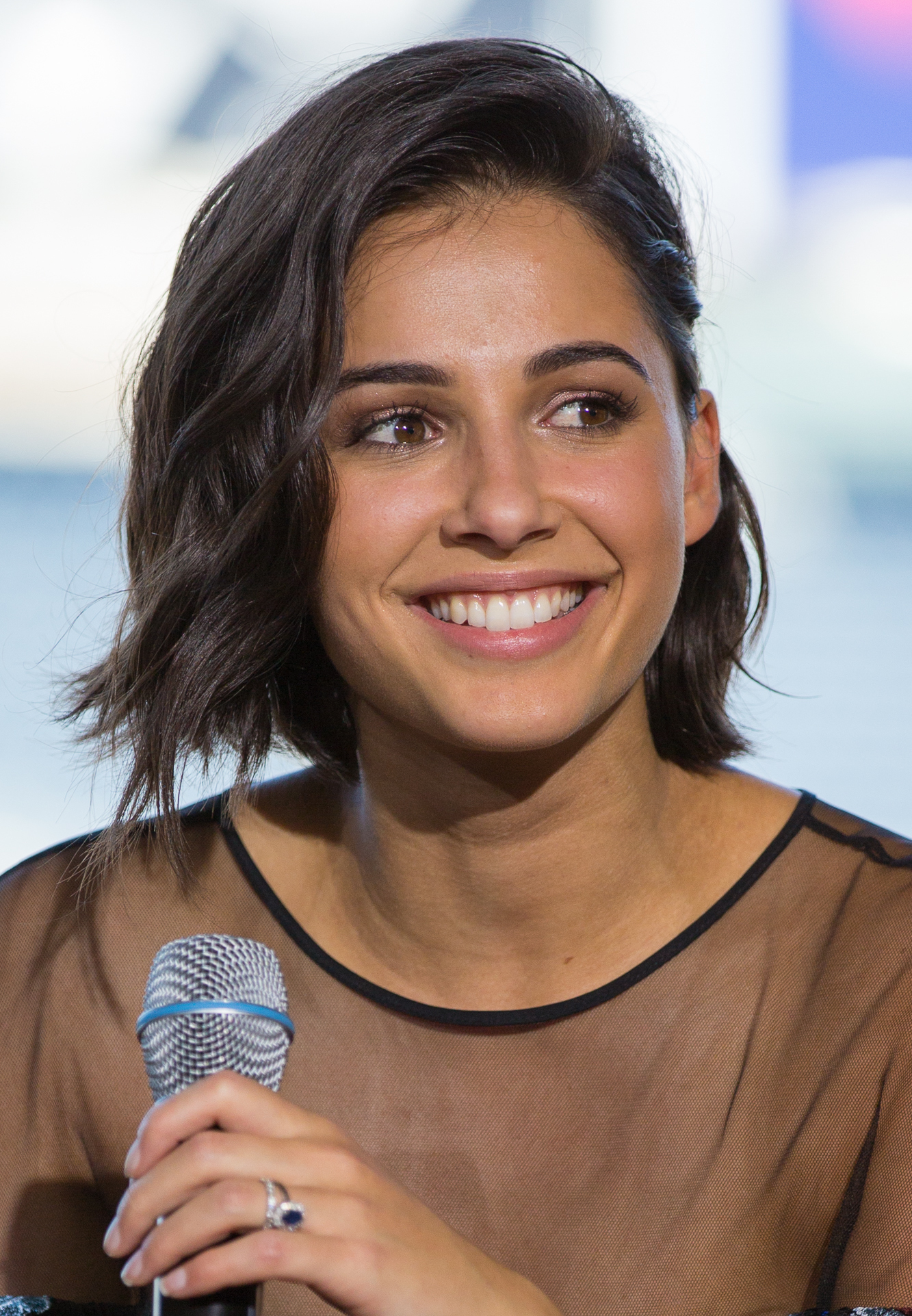
Naomi Scott, Best Performance in a Horror or Thriller winner

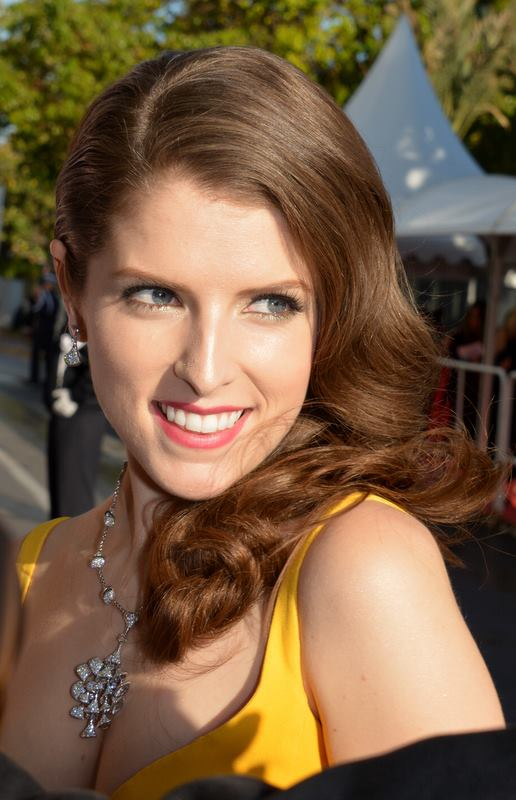
Anna Kendrick, Best First Feature winner

**Best Picture**: **Wicked**; Anora; The Brutalist; Challengers; Conclave; Dune: Part Two; Emilia Pérez; A Real Pain; Sing Sing; The Substance	**Best Director**: **Jon M. Chu – Wicked**; Jacques Audiard – Emilia Pérez; Sean Baker – Anora; Brady Corbet – The Brutalist; Coralie Fargeat – The Substance; Denis Villeneuve – Dune: Part Two
**Best Actor**: **Timothée Chalamet – A Complete Unknown as Bob Dylan**; Adrien Brody – The Brutalist as László Tóth; Colman Domingo – Sing Sing as Divine G; Jesse Eisenberg – A Real Pain as David Kaplan; Ralph Fiennes – Conclave as Thomas Lawrence; Glen Powell – Hit Man as Gary Johnson	**Best Actress**: **Cynthia Erivo – Wicked as Elphaba Thropp**; Karla Sofía Gascón – Emilia Pérez as Emilia Pérez; Angelina Jolie – Maria as Maria Callas; Mikey Madison – Anora as Anora "Ani" Mikheeva; Demi Moore – The Substance as Elisabeth Sparkle; Naomi Scott – Smile 2 as Skye Riley
**Best Supporting Actor**: **Kieran Culkin – A Real Pain as Benji Kaplan**; Jonathan Bailey – Wicked as Fiyero Tigelaar; Yura Borisov – Anora as Igor; Clarence Maclin – Sing Sing as Clarence "Divine Eye" Maclin; Guy Pearce – The Brutalist as Harrison Lee Van Buren Sr.; Denzel Washington – Gladiator II as Macrinus	**Best Supporting Actress**: **Ariana Grande – Wicked as Galinda "Glinda" Upland (TIE)**; **Zoe Saldaña – Emilia Pérez as Rita Mora Castro (TIE)**; Danielle Deadwyler – The Piano Lesson as Berniece Charles; Aunjanue Ellis-Taylor – Nickel Boys as Hattie; Selena Gomez – Emilia Pérez as Jessi Del Monte; Margaret Qualley – The Substance as Sue
**Best Original Screenplay**: **A Real Pain – Jesse Eisenberg**; Anora – Sean Baker; The Brutalist – Brady Corbet and Mona Fastvold; Challengers – Justin Kuritzkes; Saturday Night – Gil Kenan and Jason Reitman; The Substance – Coralie Fargeat	**Best Adapted Screenplay**: **Dune: Part Two – Denis Villeneuve and Jon Spaihts**; Conclave – Peter Straughan; Hit Man – Glen Powell and Richard Linklater; Nickel Boys – RaMell Ross and Joslyn Barnes; Sing Sing – Clint Bentley and Greg Kwedar; Wicked – Winnie Holzman and Dana Fox
**Best Animated Feature**: **The Wild Robot**; Flow; Inside Out 2; Memoir of a Snail; Transformers One; Wallace & Gromit: Vengeance Most Fowl	**Best Voice Over Performance**: **Lupita Nyong'o – The Wild Robot as Roz / Rummage**; Maya Hawke – Inside Out 2 as Anxiety; Brian Tyree Henry – Transformers One as D-16 / Megatron; Pedro Pascal – The Wild Robot as Fink; Amy Poehler – Inside Out 2 as Joy; Owen Teague – Kingdom of the Planet of the Apes as Noa
**Best Horror or Thriller Feature**: **The Substance**; Alien: Romulus; Heretic; Longlegs; Nosferatu; Smile 2	**Best Performance in a Horror or Thriller**: **Naomi Scott – Smile 2 as Skye Riley**; Hugh Grant – Heretic as Mr. Reed; Demi Moore – The Substance as Elisabeth Sparkle; Lupita Nyong'o – A Quiet Place: Day One as Samira; Margaret Qualley – The Substance as Sue; Bill Skarsgård – Nosferatu as Count Orlok
**Best Action or Science Fiction Feature**: **Monkey Man**; Civil War; The Fall Guy; Furiosa: A Mad Max Saga; Kingdom of the Planet of the Apes; Twisters	**Best Comedy or Musical**: **Challengers**; Anora; Deadpool & Wolverine; Saturday Night; A Real Pain; Wicked
**Best Documentary Feature**: **Super/Man: The Christopher Reeve Story**; Black Box Diaries; Daughters; Music by John Williams; The Remarkable Life of Ibelin; Will & Harper	**Best International Feature**: **Emilia Pérez**; All We Imagine as Light; Flow; I'm Still Here; Kneecap; The Seed of the Sacred Fig
**Best Indie Feature**: **The Last Showgirl**; The Apprentice; Hundreds of Beavers; Late Night with the Devil; Strange Darling; Thelma	**Best First Feature**: **Anna Kendrick – Woman of the Hour**; Zoë Kravitz – Blink Twice; Kelsey Mann – Inside Out 2; Dev Patel – Monkey Man; Sean Wang – Dìdi; Malcolm Washington – The Piano Lesson
**Best Cast Ensemble**: **Saturday Night**; Conclave; Dune: Part Two; Emilia Pérez; Gladiator II; Wicked

== Honorary awards ==
- Artisan Spotlight Award – Jomo Fray
- Artisan Icon Award – Colleen Atwood
- Breakthrough Award – Monica Barbaro
- Artisan Achievement Award – Kris Bowers
- Game Changer Award – Karla Sofía Gascón
- Artisan Breakthrough Award – Giovanni Ribisi
- Filmmaker on the Rise Award – Jennifer Esposito

== Films with multiple wins ==
The following films received multiple awards:

Wins	Film
4	Wicked
2	Emilia Pérez
2	A Real Pain
2	The Wild Robot

== Films with multiple nominations ==
The following films received multiple nominations:

Nominations	Film
8	The Substance
8	Wicked
7	Emilia Pérez
6	Anora
5	The Brutalist
5	A Real Pain
4	Conclave
4	Dune: Part Two
4	Inside Out 2
4	Sing Sing
3	Challengers
3	Saturday Night
3	Smile 2
3	The Wild Robot
2	Flow
2	Gladiator II
2	Heretic
2	Hit Man
2	Kingdom of the Planet of the Apes
2	Monkey Man
2	Nickel Boys
2	Nosferatu
2	The Piano Lesson
2	Transformers One

== See also ==
- 4th Astra TV Awards
- 3rd Astra Creative Arts Awards
- 7th Astra Midseason Movie Awards
