= Challengers (film) =

2024 film by Luca Guadagnino

- Theatrical release poster
- Directed by: Luca Guadagnino
- Written by: Justin Kuritzkes
- Produced by: Amy Pascal; Luca Guadagnino; Zendaya; Rachel O'Connor
- Starring: Zendaya; Josh O'Connor; Mike Faist
- Cinematography: Sayombhu Mukdeeprom
- Edited by: Marco Costa
- Music by: Trent Reznor; Atticus Ross
- Production companies: Amazon MGM Studios; Pascal Pictures; Frenesy Film Company; Why Are You Acting?
- Distributed by: Amazon MGM Studios (Note: Released through the Metro-Goldwyn-Mayer banner) (United States); Warner Bros. Pictures (International)
- Release dates: March 26, 2024 (Sydney); April 26, 2024 (United States)
- Running time: 131 minutes
- Countries: United States; Italy
- Language: English
- Budget: $55 million
- Box office: $96 million

Challengers is a 2024 romantic sports film directed by Luca Guadagnino and written by Justin Kuritzkes. A co-production between Italy and the United States, the film follows the love triangle between an injured tennis star-turned-coach (Zendaya), her low-circuit tennis player ex-boyfriend (Josh O'Connor), and her tennis champion husband (Mike Faist) across 13 years of their relationship, culminating in the match between the two men on the ATP Challenger Tour.

Kuritzkes's screenplay was acquired by MGM in February 2022, with the main cast and Guadagnino being hired shortly after; Zendaya, O'Connor, and Faist trained for months with former tennis player and coach Brad Gilbert to prepare for their roles. Principal photography ran from May to June 2022, primarily in Boston. Sayombhu Mukdeeprom, who previously worked with Guadagnino on Call Me by Your Name (2017) and Suspiria (2018), served as cinematographer.

Delayed from an initial September 2023 release in response to the 2023 SAG-AFTRA strike, Challengers premiered in Sydney on March 26, 2024, and was theatrically released in the United States by Amazon MGM Studios one month later. It grossed $96 million worldwide and received positive reviews from critics. Among the film's accolades were four nominations at the 82nd Golden Globe Awards (including Best Motion Picture – Musical or Comedy), where it won Best Original Score.

== Plot ==
In 2006, best friends Patrick Zweig and Art Donaldson win the boys' junior doubles title at the US Open. They watch Tashi Duncan, a rising star, win the girls' junior singles final, and both Patrick and Art become infatuated with her. After meeting at a party, Tashi joins Art and Patrick in their hotel room. Tashi asks if Art and Patrick have ever been interested in each other, which they awkwardly deny. She leads all three of them to kiss, pulls back so Art and Patrick kiss each other, then abruptly ends the tryst. She promises to give her phone number to whoever wins the boys' singles final the next day. When Art asks what she wants out of the match, she states she'd want "to watch some good fucking tennis."

Patrick wins the match and later reveals to Art that he and Tashi have been seeing each other, though Tashi made him promise to keep their meetings secret. Art asks Patrick to copy Art's serve to signal if he and Tashi have slept together, and Patrick does so by placing the ball in the neck of his racket prior to serving, a tell of Art's.

In 2007, Tashi and Art play college tennis at Stanford University, while Patrick turns professional and begins a long-distance relationship with Tashi. Art suggests to Tashi that Patrick does not love her, to which Tashi angrily responds that she does not need that in a relationship. When Patrick visits Stanford to see Tashi compete, Art similarly suggests to him that Tashi does not take the relationship seriously. When about to have sex with Patrick, Tashi attempts to provide coaching on Patrick's playing, causing them to argue. Patrick skips her match as a result. While playing, Tashi is distracted and tears her ACL. Patrick comes to see Tashi, but Tashi angrily demands he leave. Art sides with her, ending his friendship with Patrick. Art aids in Tashi's recovery, but the injury ends her playing career.

In 2010, Tashi reconnects with Art, now a professional player, and becomes his coach and girlfriend. In 2011, Tashi and Art are now engaged, and Art's career is on the rise. Tashi and Patrick run into each other at the Atlanta Open and have a one-night stand, which Art notices.

In 2019, Tashi and Art are a wealthy power couple with a young daughter. Art is only one US Open title away from a Career Grand Slam but has been struggling due to injury and age. Tashi enters Art as a wild card in a Challenger event in New Rochelle, New York, hoping to boost his confidence and return him to form. Meanwhile, Patrick is living out of his car and scraping by on winnings from the lower circuits. He happens to enter the New Rochelle Challenger as well, since winning the tournament would gain him entry to the US Open qualifying competition.

Sensing Art's desire to retire, Patrick asks Tashi to coach him to a last winning season and gives her his phone number. She refuses but keeps the slip of paper with his phone number on it. Starting at opposite ends of the seeding, Art and Patrick advance through the brackets until they find themselves facing each other in the final. Patrick initially tries to provoke Art the day before the final match, though he then attempts to reconnect with Art. Art rebuffs Patrick, denigrating Patrick's lack of professional success.

The evening before the final, Art tells Tashi he plans to retire at the end of the season whether he wins the Open or not. Tashi is visibly unhappy but reluctantly accepts Art's decision. That night, Tashi secretly meets with Patrick to ask him to throw the match to Art, claiming it is to boost his confidence. Patrick is disgusted but then agrees, and he and Tashi have a passionate argument before having sex inside his car.

The day of the final, Tashi watches as Art and Patrick play. Patrick wins the first set and Art the second. Although the match remains close, Art reaches a match point. Patrick signals that he has slept with Tashi by copying Art's serve tell, which Tashi cannot decode. Stunned, Art allows Patrick to score to bring the match to a final tie break.

During the tie break, Art and Patrick furiously trade groundstrokes, both reminded of their passion for the sport. The rally intensifies, and Art jumps for a volley at the net. As Art lunges for a final shot, he collides with Patrick over the net and the two embrace, while the final score is not shown. Tashi leaps from her seat and yells, "Come on!" before smiling and clapping.

== Cast ==
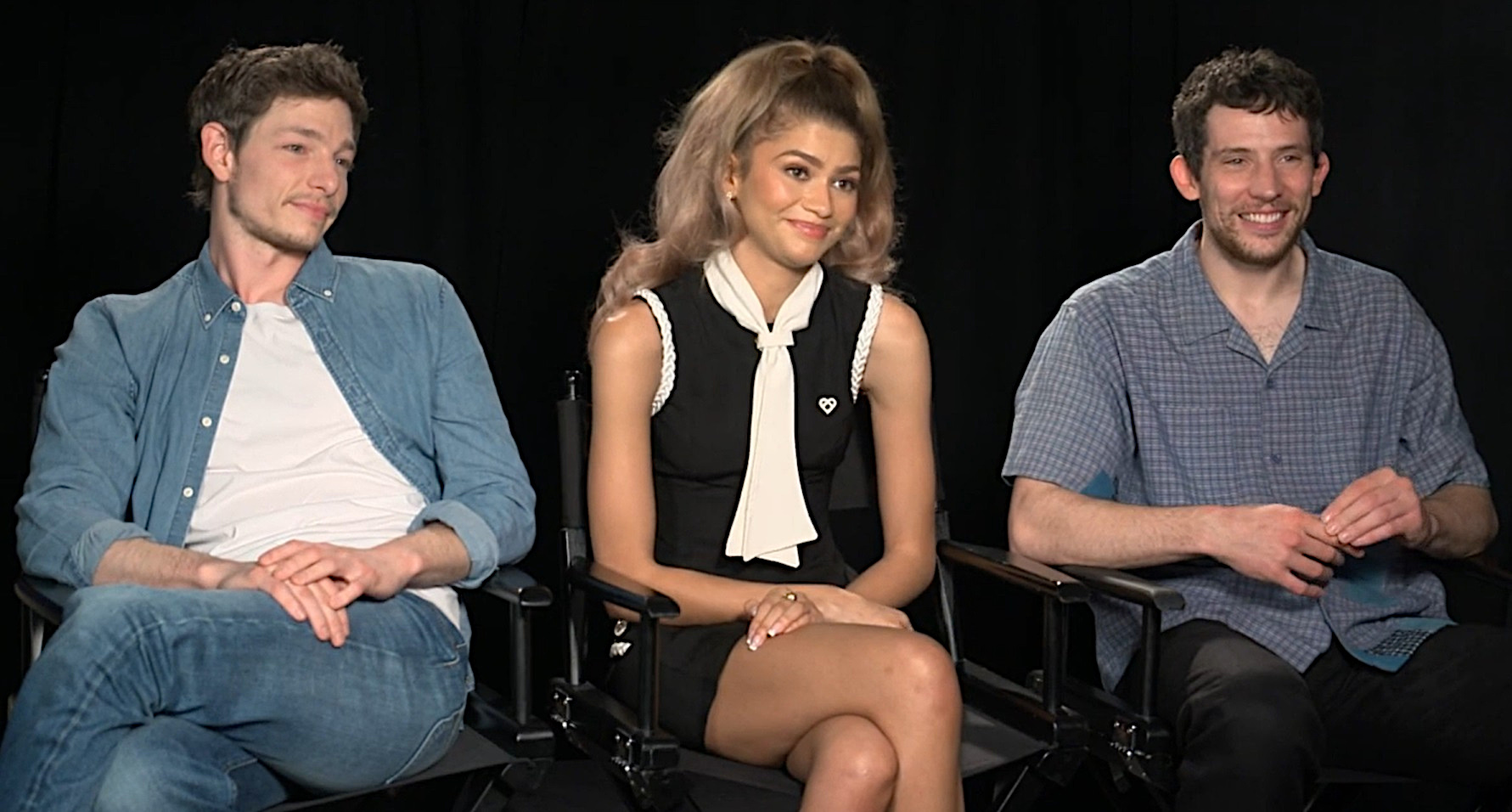
The cast of Challengers in 2024. From left to right: Mike Faist, Zendaya, Josh O'Connor.

- Zendaya as Tashi Duncan
- Josh O'Connor as Patrick Zweig
- Mike Faist as Art Donaldson
- Darnell Appling as New Rochelle Final Umpire
- Shane Harris as Art's security guard
- Nada Despotovich as Tashi's mother
- AJ Lister as Lily Donaldson
- Naheem Garcia as Tashi's father
- Jake Jensen as Finn Larsen
- Hailey Gates as Helen

== Production ==
=== Development ===
Writer Justin Kuritzkes was inspired to make a tennis film after watching the 2018 U.S. Open match between Serena Williams and Naomi Osaka, in which Williams was penalized for receiving coaching from the sidelines. He had never heard of the rule and thought the fact that the player could not talk with such an important figure during the match seemed cinematic. He observed, "What if you really had to talk about something important that went beyond tennis? Something going on with you personally?" While doing research for the script, he read Andre Agassi's memoir Open, in which Agassi recounts how his then-coach Brad Gilbert entered him into a Challenger event in Nevada. This served as inspiration for Art's arc in the film.

Kuritzkes also knew what the characters' origins were while writing: "Tashi was always a Black woman. Patrick was always a very well-to-do Jewish guy, and Art was always a somewhat well-to-do WASP." He thought that a story about tennis with no Black characters would be weird because "that is the story of American women's tennis, if you look at all of the big superstars from the past decade". The script landed on The Black List, an annual list of the best unproduced scripts in Hollywood, in December 2021. That same year, producing partners Amy Pascal and Rachel O'Connor read the script. Pascal had been wanting to work with director Luca Guadagnino for a long time, and sent him the script while he was filming the short film O Night Divine starring John C. Reilly. Guadagnino recalled, "I had the script on set, hiding myself from John C., not showing him that I was reading while I was directing. Anyway, I found it amazing." In a 2022 interview with Collider, Guadagnino cited Kuritzkes's screenplay, Pascal, and Zendaya as inspirations for making the film. At the behest of Guadagnino, Kuritzkes modified the script to add a scene where Patrick and Art end up kissing each other: "Luca felt it was very important that, in any love triangle, all the corners touch, and I quickly realized he meant it literally."

In early 2022, MGM's then-chairman Kevin Ulrich met with Guadagnino to discuss distributing the independently financed Bones and All. During the meeting, Guadagnino told Ulrich he was also in the midst of developing a "sexy tennis story starring Zendaya". Ulrich contacted Michael De Luca and Pamela Abdy, the then-heads of MGM, and they negotiated a two-picture deal over the next 24 hours to pick up both films. When Amazon completed its acquisition of MGM, it inherited the films, and Zendaya gained a $10 million paycheck as both star and producer. In February 2022, the film was announced with Zendaya, Josh O'Connor, and Mike Faist set to star.

=== Casting ===
Pascal's first choice to play Tashi was Zendaya, whom she knew from working with her on several Spider-Man films, and passed her the script. Zendaya accepted the role, as it would be a departure from the teenagers she was used to portraying, and she felt it was the right time to move into more adult roles: "It was nice to play a character that was not a child anymore. It was also interesting playing parts of my life that I haven't experienced yet: I've not gotten married. I've not had a child. Those milestones, I don't necessarily have a direct reference point for."

Guadagnino suggested Josh O'Connor should play the cocky Patrick. For the role of Art, Guadagnino considered West Side Story star Mike Faist, whose agent insisted he read the script; Faist then agreed to travel to London for a screen test with Zendaya. He later said, "I thought, 'Why not? If I don't get the job, I got a trip out of it.'" He thought that the audition had gone badly, but Guadagnino loved his interpretation of the character. Faist said that Guadagnino's main preoccupations were that he was blond and that his body should be hairless. Faist was put off by the idea of shaving his body, but Guadagnino felt that he needed to be "aerodynamic" as an athlete. Zendaya stated that herself, Faist and O'Connor had a group chat where she was the "mom" of the group and that both actors made her "feel safe and supported as a scene partner".

Zendaya's best friend and personal assistant Darnell Appling portrayed the umpire at the New Rochelle Final. Guadagnino wanted him to sit on the umpire chair during a camera test; he thought he would just be acting as a stand-in, as he had done previously in other Zendaya projects. Guadagnino instead asked him to play the part, which he accepted with Zendaya's blessing. To prepare for the role, Guadagnino asked Appling to attend umpire school. Appling spent three weeks filming his role. Paul Walter Hauser was previously offered the part but passed on it.

=== Filming ===
Principal photography began on May 3, 2022, in Boston, where a casting call took place for local residents to audition to play tennis players, general extras, and stand-ins. In preparation for their roles, Zendaya, Faist, and O'Connor spent three months training with pro-tennis player-turned-coach Brad Gilbert. Faist had to gain 30 pounds for the film. Gilbert, who was also a consultant on the film, said: "Mike had to eat between 8,000 to 10,000 calories a day because they wanted him to gain weight. He was super thin. He had to work on his tennis and gain like 30 pounds. I had Zendaya in Los Angeles, so we got her on a program right away, and Josh was working, so [Faist] had the latest start." During training, the actors started at 6 a.m., were at the tennis center until noon, and then would act in the afternoon. Filming occurred in and around the Back Bay and East Boston neighborhoods. Sayombhu Mukdeeprom served as cinematographer. Irish fashion designer Jonathan Anderson, who at the time served as creative director of Spanish luxury brand Loewe, worked as the film's costume designer. Filming wrapped on June 26, 2022.

=== Post-production ===
Guadagnino visited Zendaya on the set of Dune: Part Two to complete ADR for Challengers. Trent Reznor and Atticus Ross composed the film's score, having previously worked with Guadagnino on 2022's Bones and All. Guadagnino approached them to score Challengers by sending them an email that read, "Do you want to be on my next film? It's going to be super sexxy [sic]." Post-production was completed by April 2023.

== Music ==
The film's original score was composed by Trent Reznor and Atticus Ross. A remixed version was released in collaboration with Boys Noize.

== Release ==
The film was previously set to be released on September 15, 2023, and before that August 11, 2023. The film was also scheduled to have its world premiere as the opening film of the 80th Venice International Film Festival, but was delayed and pulled out from the festival by Amazon MGM Studios due to the 2023 SAG-AFTRA strike at the time.

Challengers premiered in Sydney, Australia on March 26, 2024, followed by premieres in Paris, London and at the Westwood Village Theater in Los Angeles, the latter of which had tennis player Venus Williams in attendance.

=== Theatrical ===
It was released in theaters and IMAX in the United States and Canada by Amazon MGM Studios on April 26, 2024, the same month as the centennial anniversary of the founding of MGM on April 17.

Warner Bros. Pictures serves as the film's international distributor. Although the film was initially set for a direct-to-streaming release on Amazon Prime Video in France instead of a theatrical release, the decision was reversed in January 2024, meaning the film would start streaming on the service 17 months after its initial theatrical release. The film was released there on April 24, 2024, 2 days before its release in the United States, although a spokesperson for Warner Bros. Discovery initially denied this, stating the film had not been dated for a French theatrical release yet.

=== Home media ===
The film was made available on VOD on May 17, 2024. It was released on Blu-ray and DVD on July 9, 2024.

== Reception ==
=== Box office ===
Challengers grossed $50.1 million in the United States and Canada, and $45.9 million in other territories, for a worldwide total of $96 million.

In the United States and Canada, Challengers was released alongside Boy Kills World and Unsung Hero, and was projected to gross $12–15 million from 3,477 theaters in its opening weekend. The film made $6.2 million on its first day, including $1.9 million in Thursday night previews. It went on to debut to $15 million, topping the box office and marking the best domestic opening weekend of Guadagnino's career. In its second weekend the film made $7.9 million (a drop of 49%), finishing third behind newcomer The Fall Guy and the re-release of Star Wars: The Phantom Menace. It then made $4.4 million in its third weekend.

=== Critical response ===
On the review aggregator website Rotten Tomatoes, 88% of 381 critics' reviews are positive, with an average rating of 8/10. The website's consensus reads: "With its trio of outstanding performers volleying their star power back and forth without ever dropping the ball, Challengers is a kinetic and sexy romp at court." Metacritic, which uses a weighted average, assigned the film a score of 82 out of 100, based on 64 critics, indicating "universal acclaim". Audiences polled by CinemaScore gave the film an average grade of "B+" on an A+ to F scale, while those polled by PostTrak gave it a 77% overall positive score, with 59% saying they would definitely recommend it.

NPR included Challengers in its list of the best movies and TV of 2024, with critic Linda Holmes writing that "A pounding score, adventurous editing and one of the smartest weird endings in recent memory completes a movie not quite like any other."

Filmmakers Edward Berger, Kelly Fremon Craig, Lena Dunham, Hannah Fidell, Parker Finn, Chad Hartigan, Matt Johnson, Karyn Kusama, David Lowery, JT Mollner, Lance Oppenheim, Rich Peppiatt, Daniel Scheinert, Celine Song, Nicholas Stoller and Tyler Taormina also praised the film.

In June 2025, IndieWire ranked the film at number 63 on its list of "The 100 Best Movies of the 2020s (So Far)." In July 2025, it was one of the films voted for the "Readers' Choice" edition of The New York Times' list of "The 100 Best Movies of the 21st Century," finishing at number 109.

=== Accolades ===
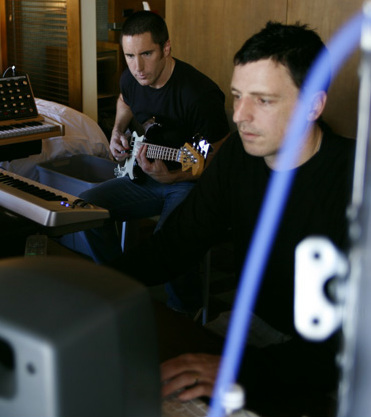
Trent Reznor and Atticus Ross received the Golden Globe Award for Best Original Score.

Challengers received four nominations at the 82nd Golden Globe Awards: Best Motion Picture – Musical or Comedy, Best Actress in a Motion Picture – Musical or Comedy (Zendaya), Best Original Score (Reznor and Ross), and Best Original Song ("Compress/Repress"). The film eventually won Best Original Score. Challengers garnered fifteen nominations at the Astra Awards, winning Best Comedy or Musical at the Astra Film Awards, Best Film Editing (Marco Costa) at the Astra Creative Arts Awards, and Best Actress (Zendaya) and Best Screenplay (Kuritzkes) at the Astra Midseason Movie Awards. The film received several other nominations, including six Dorian Awards (two wins), four Critics' Choice Movie Awards (two wins), and two Gotham Awards (one win).

The film also received the ReFrame Stamp and a Women Film Critics Circle Award for its gender-balanced production. Reznor and Ross garnered awards for their work on the score at the Critics' Choice Movie Awards and the Dorian Awards, and nominations at the Grammy Awards, the Hollywood Music in Media Awards, and the NAACP Image Awards. The film's costume designer, Jonathan Anderson, was nominated for the Costume Designers Guild Award for Excellence in Contemporary Film, and the sound designers, Craig Berkey and Paul Carter, were nominated for the International Cinephile Society Award for Best Sound Design.
