= Justin Kuritzkes =

American writer

- Born: May 5, 1990 (age 36); Los Angeles, California, U.S.
- Education: Brown University (BA)
- Occupations: Playwright; novelist; screenwriter
- Years active: 2011–present
- Spouse: Celine Song (m. 2016)

Justin Kuritzkes (/kəˈrɪtskɪs/ kə-RIT-skiss; born May 5, 1990) is an American writer best known for writing the screenplays for two of director Luca Guadagnino's films, Challengers and Queer (both 2024). He has also been the subject of media coverage because of his YouTube content, such as the viral 2011 video "Potion Seller".

== Early life and education ==
Kuritzkes was born and raised in Los Angeles, California to a Jewish family. His father is a gastroenterologist and his mother practiced real estate law.

In 2008, Kuritzkes graduated from Harvard-Westlake School in Los Angeles.

Kuritzkes attended Brown University where he studied philosophy and literary arts. At Brown, Kuritzkes studied with playwrights Gregory Moss, Lisa D'Amour, and Erik Ehn, participated in Production Workshop, and was involved in local protests affiliated with the Occupy movement. Kuritzkes graduated with a Bachelor of Arts in 2012.

== Career ==
Kuritzkes's one-act play An Autobiography of My Brother, first written for the 2008 Harvard-Westlake Playwrights Festival, was among the works honored at the 2010 Young Playwrights Competition.

Beginning during his time at Brown University, Kuritzkes uploaded videos recorded using the Photo Booth application to YouTube. The most famous of these videos, "Potion Seller", went viral online and inspired parodies in publications including The New Yorker.

Kuritzkes received a MacDowell Fellowship in both 2012 and 2016. In 2016, his play The Sensuality Party toured the university circuit of New York state. He released the novel Famous People in 2019.

In 2021, Kuritzkes's spec script Challengers was featured on the annual edition of The Black List, which was then adapted into a feature film directed by Luca Guadagnino. Ahead of the film's release, he was named one of the top 10 screenwriters to watch in 2023 by Variety. He also adapted William S. Burroughs' 1985 novel Queer for a film directed by Guadagnino.

In April 2024, Variety reported that Kuritzkes would write the screen adaptation of the Don Winslow novel City on Fire, set to star Austin Butler.

In June 2024 he was announced to be developing an untitled film with Jude Law, reportedly inspired by the works of Mike Nichols.

In November 2024, it was announced he had written a feature film based on the DC character Sgt. Rock, which would reunite him with Guadagnino and Daniel Craig, whom he had previously worked with on Queer. However, the film was scrapped in 2025.

In June 2026, it was revealed that Kuritzkes had provided rewrites for the Marvel Cinematic Universe (MCU) film Spider-Man: Brand New Day. He was originally reported to be sharing a co-writing credit with Chris McKenna and Erik Sommers, but he ultimately received an "additional literary material" credit for it.

== Personal life ==
Kuritzkes has been married to filmmaker and playwright Celine Song since June 12, 2016. They live together in New York City. In September 2026, Song confirmed her pregnancy.

== Filmography ==
Year	Title	Writer	Producer	Notes
2024	Challengers	Yes	No	—N/a
2024	Queer	Yes	Executive producer	—N/a
2026	Spider-Man: Brand New Day	Uncredited	No	Additional Literary Material

== Awards and nominations ==
Award	Year	Category	Work	Result	Ref.
Astra Film Awards	2024	Best Original Screenplay	Challengers	Nominated	
Astra Midseason Movie Awards	2024	Best Screenplay	Challengers	Won	
Chicago Film Critics Association	2024	Best Original Screenplay	Challengers	Nominated	
Critics' Choice Movie Awards	2025	Best Original Screenplay	Challengers	Nominated	
San Diego Film Critics Society	2024	Best Original Screenplay	Challengers	Runner-up	
Washington D.C. Area Film Critics Association	2024	Best Original Screenplay	Challengers	Nominated	
Winter IndieWire Honors	2024	Impact Award (Note: Shared with Luca Guadagnino, Amy Pascal, and Rachel O'Connor)	Challengers	Won	
Writers Guild of America Awards	2025	Best Original Screenplay	Challengers	Nominated	
Florida Film Critics Circle	2024	Best Adapted Screenplay	Queer	Won	

== Bibliography ==
- Famous People: a novel (2019). New York: Henry Holt and Company. ISBN 978-1-250-30902-0
