= Astra Midseason Movie Award for Best Actress =

Film award category

The Astra Midseason Movie Award for Best Actress is one of the annual mid-season awards given by the Hollywood Creative Alliance.

== Winners and nominees ==
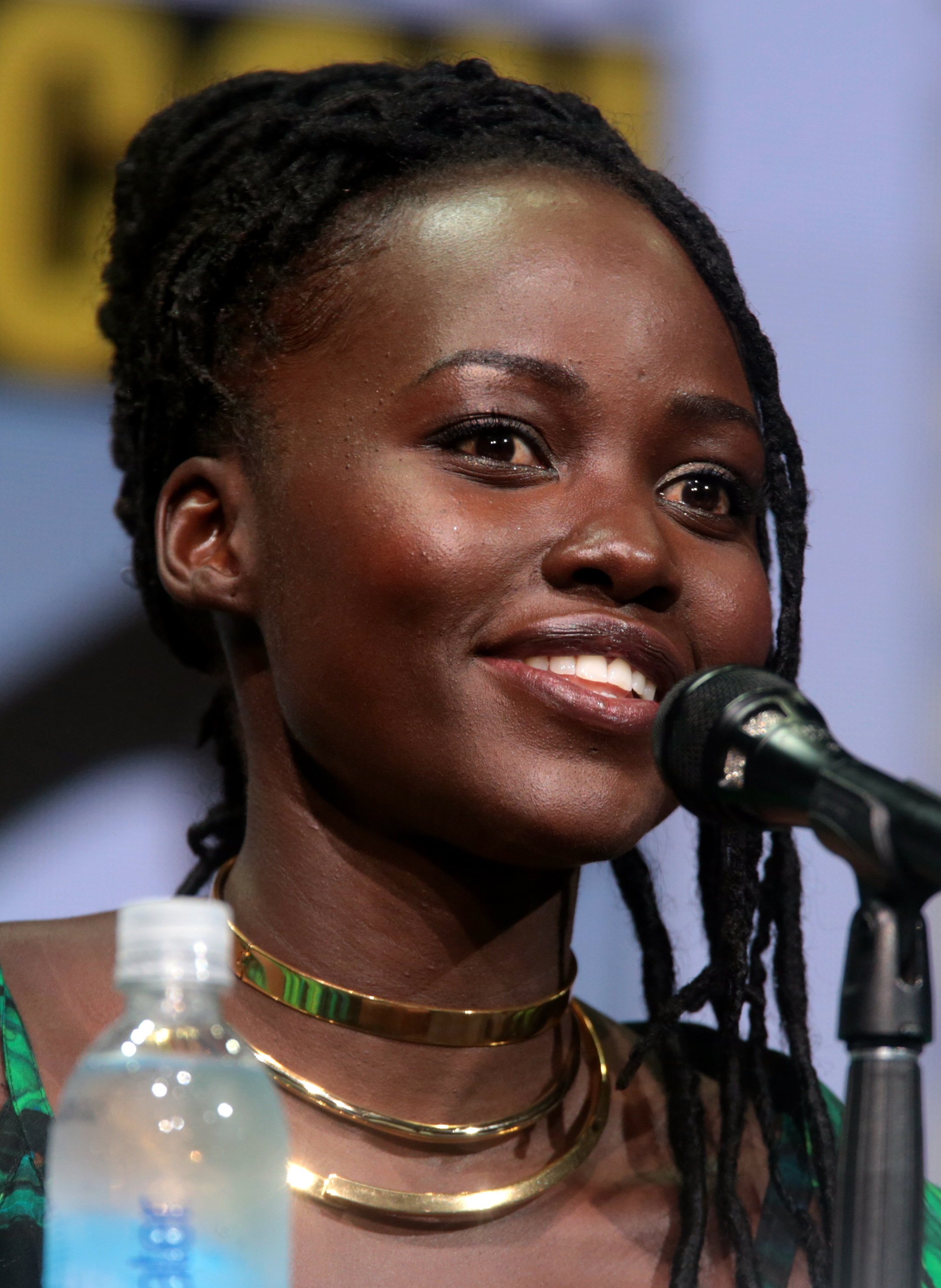
Lupita Nyong'o won for Us (2019)

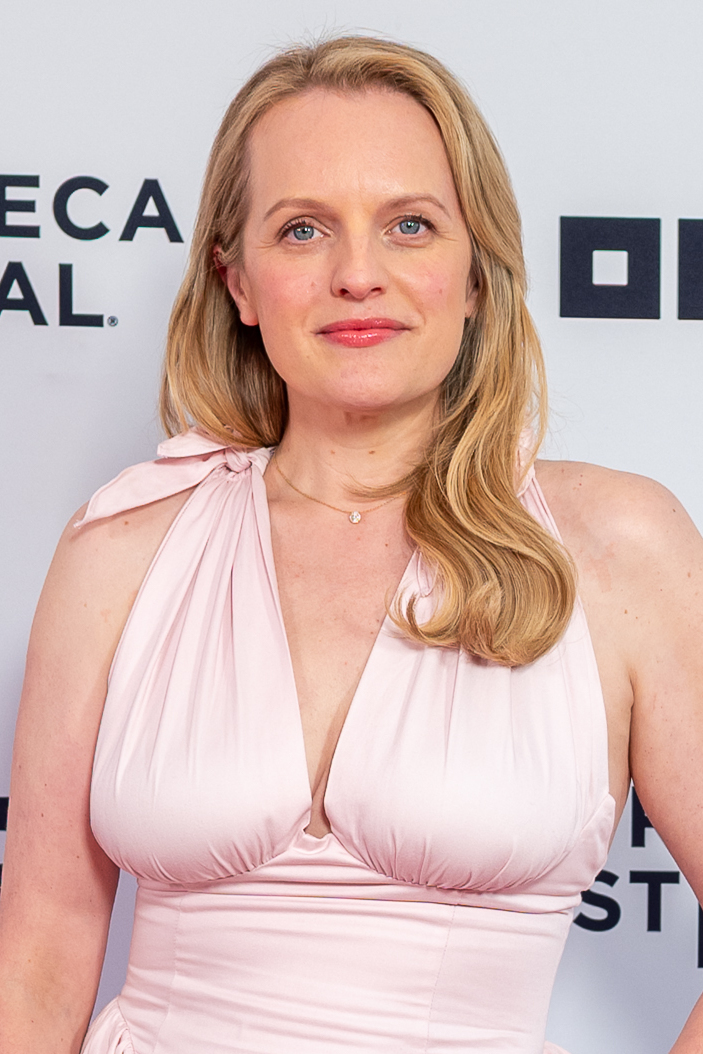
Elisabeth Moss won for The Invisible Man (2020)

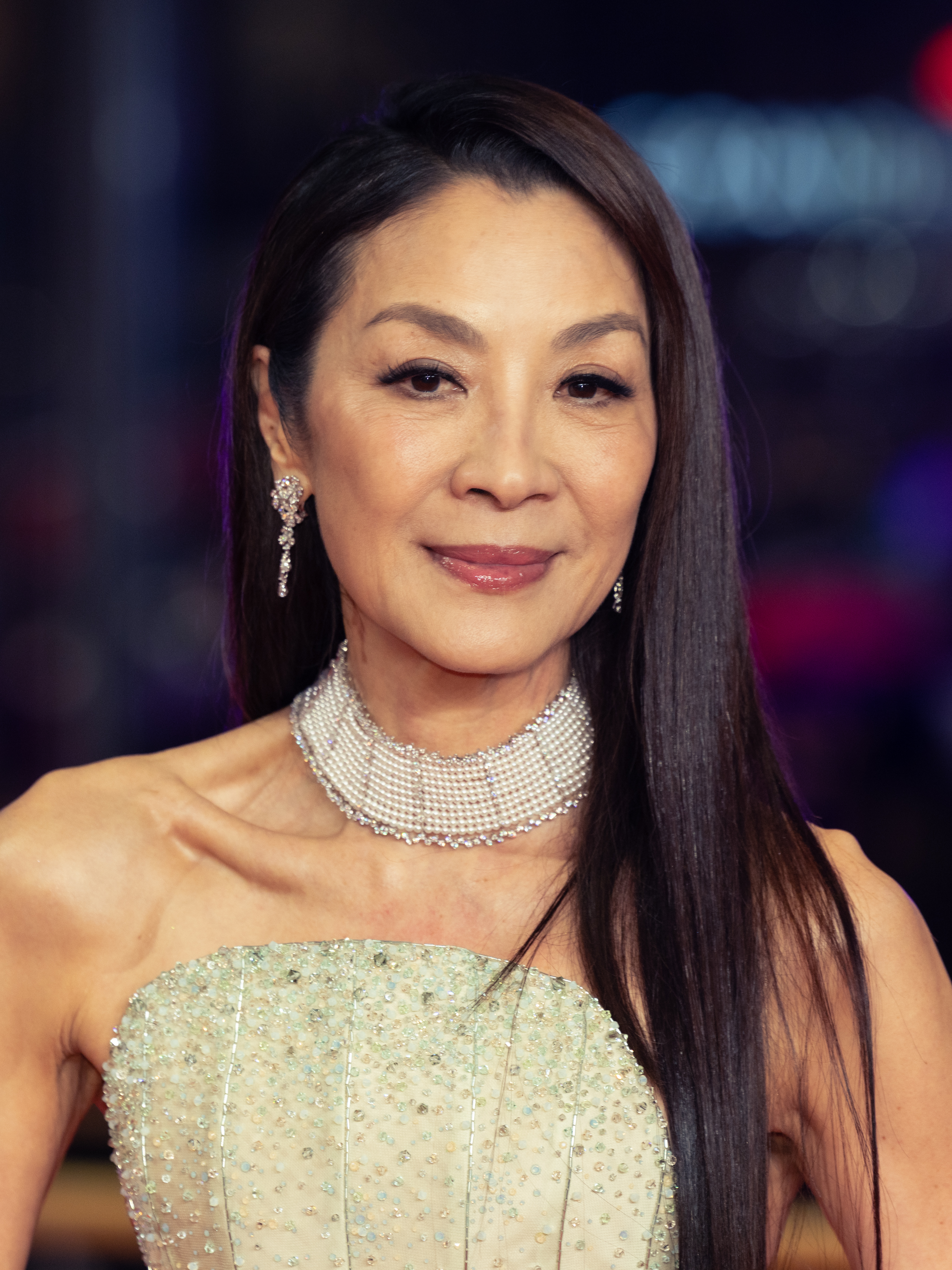
Michelle Yeoh won for Everything Everywhere All at Once (2022)

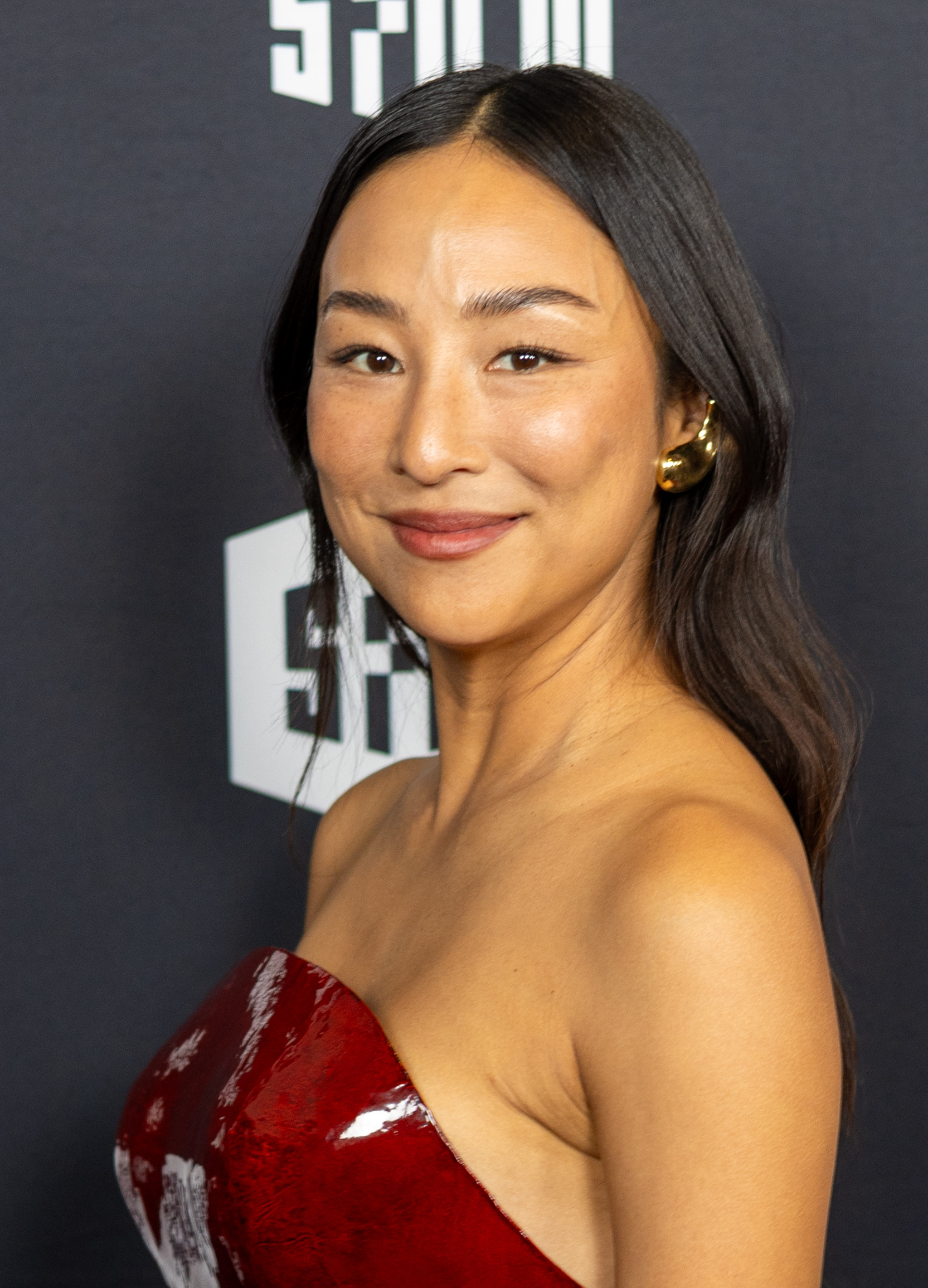
Greta Lee won for Past Lives (2023)

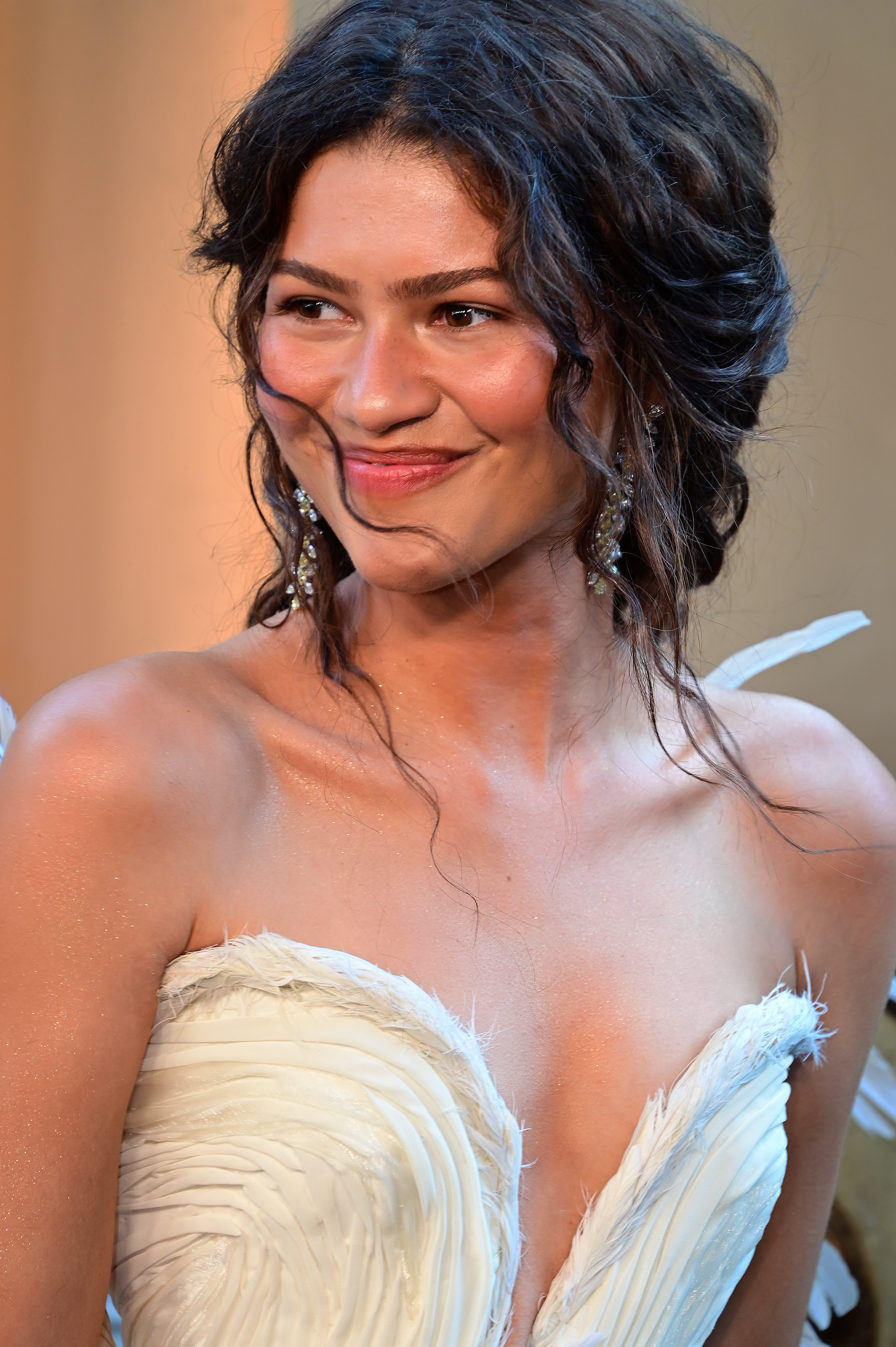
Zendaya won for Challengers (2024)

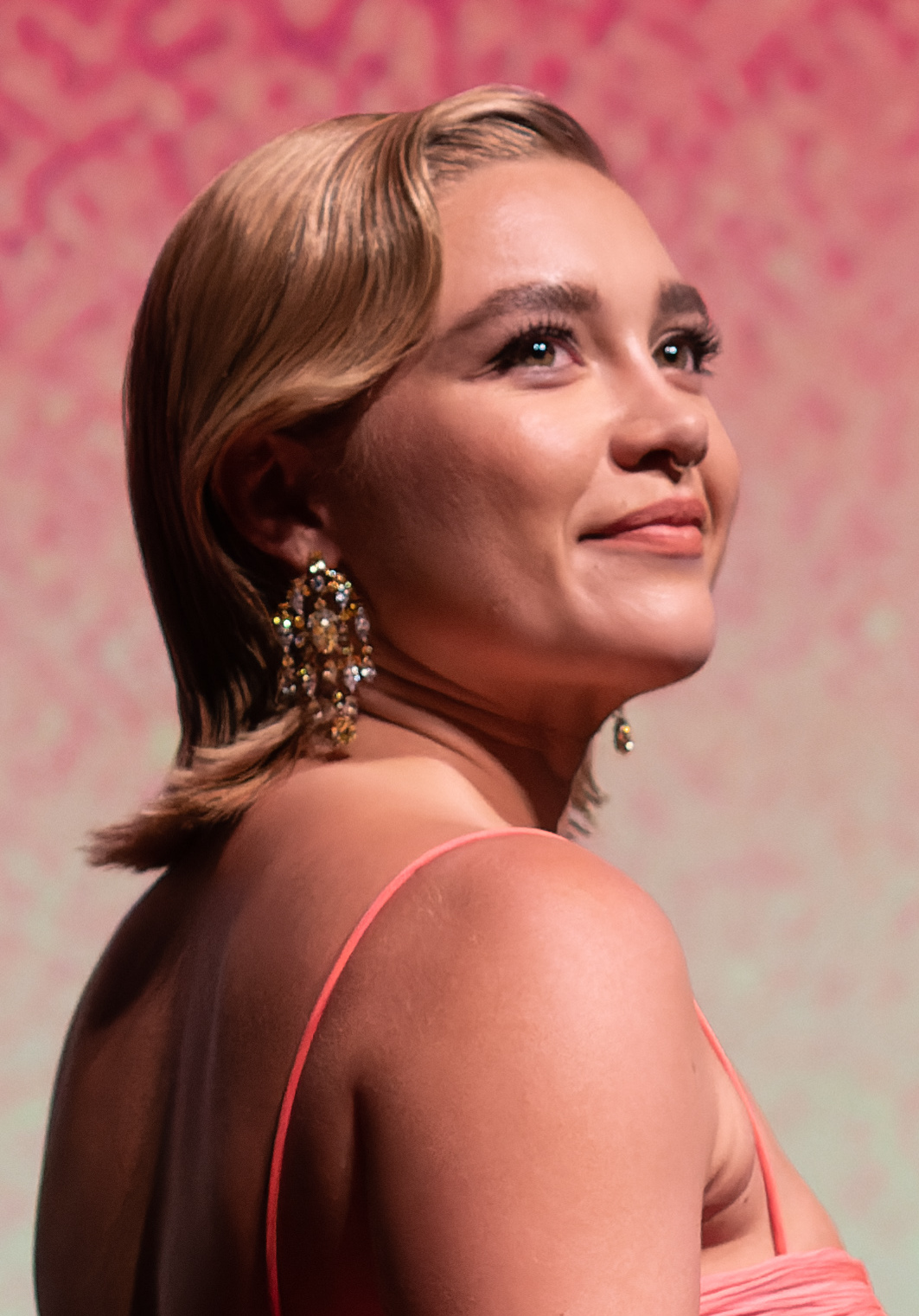
Florence Pugh won for Thunderbolts* (2025)

=== 2010s ===
Year	Actor	Role(s)	Project(s)	Ref.
2018	Toni Collette	Hereditary	Annie Graham	
2018	Charlize Theron	Tully	Marlo Moreau	
2018	Danai Gurira	Black Panther	Okoye	
2018	Emily Blunt	A Quiet Place	Evelyn Abbott	
2018	Natalie Portman	Annihilation	Lena	
2019	Lupita Nyong'o	Us	Adelaide Wilson/Red	
2019	Kaitlyn Dever	Booksmart	Amy	
2019	Beanie Feldstein	Booksmart	Molly	
2019	Elisabeth Moss	Her Smell	Becky Something	
2019	Emma Thompson	Late Night	Katherine Newbury	

=== 2020s ===
Year	Actor	Role(s)	Project(s)	Ref.
2020	Elisabeth Moss	The Invisible Man	Cecilia Kass	
2020	Sidney Flanigan	Never Rarely Sometimes Always	Autumn	
2020	Elisabeth Moss	Shirley	Shirley Jackson	
2020	Margot Robbie	Birds of Prey	Harley Quinn	
2020	Anya Taylor-Joy	Emma	Emma Woodhouse	
2021	Millicent Simmonds	A Quiet Place Part II	Regan Abbott	
2021	Niamh Algar	Censor	Enid Baines	
2021	Melissa Barrera	In the Heights	Vanessa Morales	
2021	Rachel Sennott	Shiva Baby	Danielle	
2021	Emma Stone	Cruella	Estella von Hellman	
2022	Michelle Yeoh	Everything Everywhere All at Once	Evelyn Quan Wang	
2022	Daisy Edgar-Jones	Fresh	Noa	
2022	Mia Goth	X	Maxine Minx / Pearl	
2022	Jenna Ortega	The Fallout	Vada Cavell	
2022	Emma Thompson	Good Luck to You, Leo Grande	Nancy Stokes / Susan Robinson	
2023	Greta Lee	Past Lives	Nora Moon	
2023	Abby Ryder Fortson	Are You There God? It's Me, Margaret.	Margaret Simon	
2023	Mia Goth	Infinity Pool	Gabi Bauer	
2023	Julia Louis-Dreyfus	You Hurt My Feelings	Beth	
2023	Teyana Taylor	A Thousand and One	Inez de la Paz	
2024	Zendaya	Challengers	Tashi Duncan	
2024	Emily Blunt	The Fall Guy	Jody Moreno	
2024	Kirsten Dunst	Civil War	Lee Smith	
2024	Kristen Stewart	Love Lies Bleeding	Louise "Lou" Langston	
2024	Anya Taylor-Joy	Furiosa: A Mad Max Saga	Furiosa	
2025	Florence Pugh	Thunderbolts*	Yelena Belova	
2025	Sally Hawkins	Bring Her Back	Laura	
2025	Dakota Johnson	Materialists	Lucy	
2025	Sophie Thatcher	Companion	Iris	
2025	Eva Victor	Sorry, Baby	Agnes	
2026	Inde Navarrette	Obsession	Nikki Freeman	
2026	Emily Blunt	Disclosure Day	Margaret Fairchild	
2026	Rachel McAdams	Send Help	Linda Liddle	
2026	Keke Palmer	I Love Boosters	Corvette	
2026	Margot Robbie	Wuthering Heights	Catherine "Cathy" Earnshaw	
2026	Zendaya	The Drama	Emma Harwood	

== Multiple nominations ==
3 nominations

- Emily Blunt
- Elisabeth Moss

2 nominations

- Mia Goth
- Anya Taylor-Joy
- Emma Thompson
- Zendaya
