= The Fall Guy (2024 film) =

Film by David Leitch

- Theatrical release poster
- Directed by: David Leitch
- Written by: Drew Pearce
- Based on: The Fall Guy by Glen A. Larson
- Produced by: Kelly McCormick; David Leitch; Guymon Casady; Ryan Gosling
- Starring: Ryan Gosling; Emily Blunt; Aaron Taylor-Johnson; Hannah Waddingham; Teresa Palmer; Stephanie Hsu; Winston Duke
- Cinematography: Jonathan Sela
- Edited by: Elísabet Ronaldsdóttir
- Music by: Dominic Lewis
- Production companies: Universal Pictures; 87North Productions; Entertainment 360
- Distributed by: Universal Pictures
- Release dates: March 12, 2024 (SXSW); May 3, 2024 (United States)
- Running time: 126 minutes
- Country: United States
- Language: English
- Budget: $125–150 million (Note: Reported production costs for The Fall Guy ranged from as low as $125 million to as high as $150 million, with a majority of trade publications listing the budget at $130 million.)
- Box office: $181 million

The Fall Guy is a 2024 American action comedy film directed by David Leitch and written by Drew Pearce, loosely based on the 1980s TV series. The film stars Ryan Gosling and Emily Blunt. The cast also features Aaron Taylor-Johnson, Hannah Waddingham, Teresa Palmer, Stephanie Hsu, and Winston Duke. The plot follows a stuntman working on his former girlfriend's directorial debut action film, only to find himself involved in a conspiracy surrounding the film's main actor.

The Fall Guy premiered at SXSW on March 12, 2024, and it was released in the United States on May 3 by Universal Pictures. The film received generally positive reviews from critics, yet it underperformed at the box office, grossing $181 million worldwide against a $125–150 million production budget and losing the studio around $50 million.

== Plot ==
Working as the stunt double for action star Tom Ryder, Hollywood stunt performer Colt Seavers breaks his back during a stunt gone wrong and abandons his career and his girlfriend, camerawoman Jody Moreno.

Eighteen months later, Colt, now a valet for a small Mexican restaurant, is contacted by Gail Meyer, Tom's film producer. She tells him that Jody is directing her first film, a space opera film titled Metalstorm starring Tom, and that she wants Colt to join the production in Sydney. After arriving on set, Colt learns that Jody never asked for him and is still furious about their breakup, with the film serving as a less-than-subtle attempt to air her grievances at Colt.

Gail reveals that Tom has disappeared after getting into trouble with "very bad people", so she wants Colt to find him before his absence causes the already-overbudget film to be canceled. Not wanting Jody's directorial debut ruined, Colt agrees. He first goes to Tom's apartment, where he meets Tom's girlfriend and co-star, Iggy.

A lead Iggy gives Colt sends him to a nightclub. There he meets drug dealer Doone, who tricks Colt into drinking a cocktail laced with a hallucinogen. After getting into a fight with Doone's henchmen, he visits Tom's hotel room, where he finds a dead body in a bathtub full of ice. When Colt returns with the police, the body has disappeared.

As the production of Metalstorm continues, Colt and Jody begin to rekindle their relationship, until Gail abruptly informs him that he must return to the United States. Instead, he continues looking for Tom by tracking down his personal assistant Alma Milan. She hands him Tom's phone, which Tom and Gail had been searching for, before they are both attacked by Tom's head of security, Dressler, and his team, who are looking for the phone.

Colt and Alma defeat them after an extended chase through Sydney involving a rubbish truck. He and his long-time friend Dan Tucker, the stunt coordinator on Metalstorm, unlock the phone. On it they discover a video of an intoxicated Tom accidentally killing his most recent stunt double, Henry Herrera (the man in the bathtub), while sparring at a party. The henchmen attack Colt and Dan, destroying the phone with shotgun pellets.

Dan escapes, but Colt is captured and brought face-to-face with Tom, who has been hiding out on a yacht per Gail's instructions. He reveals that Gail is framing Colt for the crime using deepfake technology to replace Tom's face with Colt's on the incriminating video. Tom orchestrated Colt's accident because he felt that Colt was stealing the spotlight from him.

Henry's body is discovered, and the doctored video is released to the media. Meanwhile, Gail tries to convince Jody that Colt is guilty. He escapes and is presumed dead after a boat pursuit ends in an explosion, but he survives and swims to safety.

The next day, Tom arrives at the Metalstorm set, and production continues. Colt secretly returns to the set and convinces Jody of his innocence. Together, they trick Tom into participating in a stunt sequence and confessing while he is wired with a lav mic.

Meanwhile, the rest of the stunt team, led by Dan, hold off Tom's bodyguards. Gail steals the recording at gunpoint and tries to escape in a helicopter with Tom, but Jody helps Colt leap onto the helicopter in mid-air. He retrieves the recording and falls onto a crash mat prepared by Dan, while the helicopter crashes with Gail and Tom in it.

Metalstorm's trailer premieres at San Diego Comic-Con, with Jason Momoa as the new lead and Alma the film's new producer; the film eventually becomes a box office hit. Colt is exonerated, and he and Jody get back together.

In a mid-credits scene, Gail and Tom survive the crash, but authorities arrive to detain them. Tom leaves Gail to be arrested in order to call his agent, accidentally triggering a series of radio-controlled pyrotechnics and blowing himself up. Alma calls Momoa's agent.

== Cast ==
- Ryan Gosling as Colt Seavers, a seasoned action stuntman
- Emily Blunt as Jody Moreno, Colt's former girlfriend and a first-time director
- Aaron Taylor-Johnson as Tom Ryder, a famous action film star
- Hannah Waddingham as Gail Meyer, the producer of Jody's film
- Teresa Palmer as Iggy Starr, Tom's girlfriend and co-star
- Stephanie Hsu as Alma Milan, Tom's personal assistant
- Winston Duke as Dan Tucker, Colt's long-time friend and stunt coordinator
- Adam Dunn as Nigel, a crew member on Jody's film
- Zara Michales as Venti Kushner, the visual effects supervisor on Jody's film
- Ben Knight as Dressler, Tom's head of security

Additionally, Lee Majors and Heather Thomas, who starred as Colt Seavers and Jody Banks in the original television series, reprise their roles in a mid-credits scene with Majors credited as "The Fall Guy", while Jason Momoa has an uncredited appearance as himself. Justin Eaton, who is Ryan Gosling's stunt double in real life, portrays Henry, the stunt double who is accidentally killed. Two female Australian Kelpies portray Jean-Claude, the dog that only understands French commands.

== Production ==
=== Development ===
In July 2010, the Los Angeles Times reported that a film based on the 1980s series The Fall Guy was in development. DreamWorks Pictures had collaborated with producers Walter F. Parkes and Laurie MacDonald on the project, and Martin Campbell was in talks to direct the film. DreamWorks, through the Walt Disney Studios' Touchstone Pictures distribution label, was to release the film in North America, Latin America, Russia, Australia, and Asia, while Mister Smith Entertainment would have handled sales in the remaining territories. In September 2013, Dwayne Johnson was in negotiations to play the title role and McG was in talks to direct.

In September 2020, Ryan Gosling, director David Leitch, and writer Drew Pearce were said to be working on an "unnamed stuntman film" that had been picked up by Universal Pictures. In May 2022, it was confirmed this project was a film adaptation of The Fall Guy. Loosely based on the TV series, the film is produced by Universal with Leitch's 87North Productions and Gosling's Entertainment 360, with Leitch and Kelly McCormick producing alongside Gosling and Guymon Casady. Pearce is also an executive producer, as is Geoff Shaevitz. Variety reported that the Australian Government and the New South Wales state authorities added funds to the production up to A$30 million and A$14.5 million respectively, with Paul Fletcher, Australia's Federal Minister for Communications, Urban Infrastructure, Cities and the Arts, estimating a boom to the local economy, over 1,000 Australian cast and crew, and more than 3,015 Australian film extras.

Emily Blunt was cast in August 2022. Aaron Taylor-Johnson and Stephanie Hsu joined in October. Winston Duke, Hannah Waddingham, and Teresa Palmer were cast the following month.

Gosling and Blunt said that they took inspiration from Leitch and his producer wife, Kelly McCormick, for the romantic relationship between their characters. Blunt's role was originally a makeup artist, but it was rewritten to be a first-time director before she received a draft of the script. Blunt had some input on the character, stating that "We all kind of built her together, because I think, maybe in the original script, she was quite severe, and that sort of tough director"; she thought it was more interesting to see someone who is "in a situation where they're way over their head". For the character, Blunt took some inspiration from director Greta Gerwig and several other people she had met.

=== Filming ===
Principal photography began in October 2022 in Sydney, Australia, at the Disney Studios Australia in Moore Park, Sydney. Filming also took place at Sydney Harbour, Sydney Opera House, and the Sydney Harbour Bridge, which was closed for several daytime hours for filming scenes involving Gosling in January 2023. Production also filmed at Kurnell (located near Cronulla beach) as well as Martin Place, and near the Anzac Bridge in Pyrmont. Variety and The Hollywood Reporter reported that the film had a production budget of $130 million. Deadline Hollywood also stated its $130 million production cost after Australian tax credits, though added that "some have heard the production cost was even higher at $150 [million]".

The film used practical stunts, with highly choreographed action sequences. Leitch stated, "It was a love letter to stunts. We knew we had to be authentic in that world." It broke a Guinness World Record for the most cannon rolls in a car, with eight and a half rolls performed by stunt driver Logan Holladay. Cannon rolls are performed by firing a cannon-like device into the ground from a moving vehicle.

=== Music ===
The Fall Guy's score was composed by Dominic Lewis. The film incorporates songs by AC/DC, Taylor Swift, Kiss, the Darkness, Phil Collins, Jan Hammer, and Blake Shelton's cover of "Unknown Stuntman", an updating of the theme song of the series that was originally performed by Lee Majors. Yungblud covered the Kiss song “I Was Made for Lovin' You”. The score also samples sound effects from The Six Million Dollar Man.

=== Post-production ===
Editor Elísabet Ronaldsdóttir was on set during production, returned to Los Angeles for post-production. The sound was designed by Frankie Montano, Jon Taylor, and the team at Universal StudioPost. Visual effects studios Rising Sun Pictures, Framestore, Cinesite, Crafty Apes, Opsis and Day for Nite were involved. The bulk of VFX work was in the creation of Metalstorm, wire, and safety removal and cleanup. The digital intermediate process was led by colorist Dave Hussey at Company 3.

== Release ==
=== Theatrical ===
The Fall Guy had its world premiere at SXSW on March 12, 2024. It was released in Australia and New Zealand on April 24, in the United Kingdom on May 2, and in the United States the following day. Universal screened The Fall Guy at its CinemaCon panel on April 8.

=== Home media ===
The film was released digitally on May 21, alongside an extended cut version with 20 minutes of additional footage. The film was released on DVD, Blu-ray Disc, and 4K Ultra HD Blu-ray on July 23, 2024.

== Reception ==
=== Box office ===
The Fall Guy grossed $92.9 million in the United States and Canada, and $88.2 million in other territories, for a worldwide total of $181 million. Variety estimated the film would need to gross $275–300 million in order to break even, and reported it would end up losing the studio $50–60 million.

In the United States and Canada, The Fall Guy was released alongside Tarot, and was projected to gross $30–35 million from 4,002 theaters in its opening weekend, with some estimates of $40 million. The film made $11 million on its first day, including $3 million from preview screenings. It went on to underperform, but to top the box office, debuting at $28 million. In its second weekend the film made $14 million, finishing second behind Kingdom of the Planet of the Apes. Vulture reported: "The Fall Guy posted an admirable box-office hold. It dropped 50 percent in its second weekend, which is pretty great in our current, opening-weekend-focused era, especially considering that the film lost almost all its pricier premium screens to Kingdom of the Planet of the Apes." It then made $9 million in its third weekend, finishing fourth.

=== Critical response ===
The Fall Guy received generally positive reviews after its SXSW premiere. On the review aggregator website Rotten Tomatoes, 81% of 377 critics' reviews are positive, with an average rating of 7.1/10. The website's consensus reads: "With action, comedy, romance, and a pair of marvelously matched stars, The Fall Guy might be the rare mainstream movie with something to entertain everyone." Metacritic, which uses a weighted average, assigned the film a score of 73 out of 100, based on 57 critics, indicating "generally favorable" reviews. Audiences polled by CinemaScore gave the film an average grade of "A–" on an A+ to F scale, while those polled at PostTrak gave it a 90% overall positive score.

Writing for RogerEbert.com, Brian Tallerico said that The Fall Guy "feels like a pushback against all the CGI-heavy, character-less, humorless blockbusters that have been coming off the content production line" and provides audiences "with what too often feels like a secondary concern in big movies lately: fun". IGN called the film a "self-reflexive love letter to Hollywood stunt work", and praised Gosling and Blunt's performances and chemistry. In the Observer, Oliver Jones opined that "rather than indict Hollywood's worst instincts, the film instead echoes them ... If The Fall Guy reflects how Hollywood views women directors, it's little surprise there are so few of them."

=== Accolades ===
Award	Date of ceremony	Category	Recipient(s)	Result	Ref.
AACTA Awards	February 5 & 7, 2025	Best Visual Effects or Animation	Matt Sloan, Chris McClintock, Matt Greig, Rachel Copp, and Dan Oliver (Rising Sun Pictures)	Nominated	
Astra Film and Creative Arts Awards	December 8, 2024	Best Action or Science Fiction Feature	The Fall Guy	Nominated	
Astra Film and Creative Arts Awards	December 8, 2024	Best Marketing Campaign	The Fall Guy	Nominated	
Astra Film and Creative Arts Awards	December 8, 2024	Best Stunt Coordinator	Chris O'Hara	Won	
Astra Film and Creative Arts Awards	December 8, 2024	Best Stunts	The Fall Guy	Won	
Astra Midseason Movie Awards	July 3, 2024	Best Picture	The Fall Guy	Runner-up	
Astra Midseason Movie Awards	July 3, 2024	Best Director	David Leitch	Runner-up	
Astra Midseason Movie Awards	July 3, 2024	Best Actor	Ryan Gosling	Runner-up	
Astra Midseason Movie Awards	July 3, 2024	Best Actress	Emily Blunt	Nominated	
Astra Midseason Movie Awards	July 3, 2024	Best Supporting Actress	Hannah Waddingham	Nominated	
Astra Midseason Movie Awards	July 3, 2024	Best Stunts	The Fall Guy	Won	
Golden Trailer Awards	May 30, 2024	Best Action	"Thumbs Up" (TRANSIT)	Nominated	
Golden Trailer Awards	May 30, 2024	Best Action TV Spot	"Gosling" (Buddha Jones)	Nominated	
Golden Trailer Awards	May 30, 2024	Best Comedy	"Twist" (AV Squad)	Nominated	
Golden Trailer Awards	May 30, 2024	Best Comedy TV Spot	"Gosling" (Buddha Jones)	Nominated	
Golden Trailer Awards	May 30, 2024	Most Original TV Spot	"Everything" (AV Squad)	Won	
Golden Trailer Awards	May 30, 2024	Summer 2024 Blockbuster Trailer	"Twist" (AV Squad)	Nominated	
Location Managers Guild International Awards	August 24, 2024	Outstanding Film Commission	City of Sydney and Screen NSW	Nominated	
Location Managers Guild International Awards	August 24, 2024	Outstanding Locations in a Contemporary Feature Film	The Fall Guy	Nominated	
San Diego Film Critics Society	December 9, 2024	Best Comedic Performance	Ryan Gosling	Nominated	
San Diego Film Critics Society	December 9, 2024	Best Stunt Choreography	The Fall Guy	Won	
Saturn Awards	February 2, 2025	Best Action / Adventure Film	The Fall Guy	Nominated	
Screen Actors Guild Awards	February 23, 2025	Outstanding Performance by a Stunt Ensemble in a Motion Picture	The Fall Guy	Won	
Seattle Film Critics Society	December 16, 2024	Best Action Choreography	Chris O'Hara and Keir Beck (Stunt Coordinators) / Jonathan Eusebio (Fight Choreographer)	Nominated	
Washington D.C. Area Film Critics Association	December 8, 2024	Best Stunts	The Fall Guy	Won	

== See also ==
- List of films featuring fictional films
