= Emilia Pérez (soundtrack) =

2024 EP and soundtrack album by Clément Ducol and Camille

The music for the 2024 French crime film Emilia Pérez directed by Jacques Audiard features original songs composed by Camille, who also composed the original score with Clément Ducol. The songs were performed by the ensemble cast members, Zoe Saldaña, Karla Sofía Gascón, Selena Gomez, Adriana Paz, Mark Ivanir, amongst others. The score was nominated for Best Original Score at the 97th Academy Awards, while songs "El Mal" and "Mi Camino" were both nominated for Best Original Song, with the former winning.

== Background ==
Ducol and Camille were brought into the project even before the first draft of the script was written and designed tunes which would sync into the story, characters, their emotions. Since the film was set in Mexico, and mostly contained Spanish dialogues, a language which they were not familiar with, they wrote the lyrics with the help of Mexican translators. The songs consisted of numerous genres which were fused into one another, describing the change that underwent with the characters' transformations. Numerous songs were written with alternative versions, as much of the tunes were either had to be modified and rejected with the changes into the script.

An extended play which consisted of five original songs were released on 5 September 2024, prior to the 43-track soundtrack album that was released on 31 October 2024. The album featured original musical numbers performed by the cast and selections from the film score, as well as alternate versions of the original compositions, being included in the soundtrack. Sony Masterworks distributed both the albums into digital platforms.

The music received mostly positive critical reception, being noted for originality, fusion of genres, its integration into the story and staging, while also praising Ducol and Camille for its compositions. At the 2024 Cannes Film Festival, both of them won the Cannes Soundtrack Award and the Hollywood Music in Media Award for Best Original Score in a Feature Film.

== Development ==
"I've always loved Jacques' work because it's very raw, and I knew he would go for something very natural and break the codes of a musical. Reading the treatment, it really immediately struck me as something Shakespearean. I believed in Emilia Perez from the start."

— Camille, on her involvement in the project

French composer Clément Ducol and singer-songwriter Camille were involved in the project even before the director Jacques Audiard finished writing the script. They received a 20–30-page treatment of the script, which they got immediately hooked with, and recalled that Audiard wanted "... to basically build the story through our songs. He wanted the music to be in the heart of the action, the storytelling, the characters' psychology." While reading the script, they pointed on specific scenes that could be turned into musical numbers. They were tasked on connecting the music with the story and emotions, adding that the music does not reflect the story, but also the story. Ducol added that "It's a story of emancipation, transformation and evolution so the music embodies all of that."

Camille wrote the lyrics for the musical numbers and to have a keen understanding of the language, she and Ducol worked with Mexican translators Karla Aviles and Ignacio Chávez, who helped them on understanding the cultural references and particularities from that country. Inspired by the story and characters, the duo curated songs from various genres such as pop, rock and rap, and refrained from pre-existing ideas. Audiard described the music as trans-genre, as the music shifts along with the transformation of the characters. Both Ducol and Camille did not curate Mexican music, but had their sonic landscape aligned to the story and characters, where the geographical indication was identified through the languages and distinctive nature and sound of the city.

== Musical numbers ==
The song "El Mal" was composed during the pre-production with Camille performing a rough scratch of it. After the duo met Saldaña, she helped them providing the right arrangement for the music. Saldaña's version consisted of a fusion of genres but with an electronic arrangement, which begins with a "rapid-fire nonsense representation of [ Bob Dylan's 1965 song] 'Subterranean Homesick Blues'" and a "more funky, more ironic, kind of Talking Heads" ending with a hip-hop. Audiard, however felt that the song should be more acoustic and rougher. They then redid the song with a live rock band, that suited Saldaña's vocals. Camille added that Saldaña had a "super rhythmical and sharp voice" which suited her character and the song as well. "El Mal" was deciphered as a driving condemnation of murderers, politicians who contributed to the drug cartel, and the victims' perils were described in the song lyrics, which Camille, repeating those lyrics over and over and "felt like throwing up". Ducol further described on the context of the song, adding:

"What I like in 'El Mal' is that we are talking about things that are quite harsh, and all of a sudden, we find ourselves before a true musical number, and we understand we are no longer in reality-based cinema. There's dancing, and there's singing, and there's jumping up and down on tables, and all of the other characters become like puppets in Japanese theater. The viewer gains awareness of the story at a deeper level."

The song "Por Casualidad" was changed thrice as the script changed to reflect the incidents in the scene where Emilia made her transition and Rita became a well known lawyer. Initially, the song was written on the context of them looking back on these years and also about how Emilia presenting herself as a new person to Rita, where Audiard stated "No, Rita is scared in this scene, and we need to add suspense to the song. They're not just friends catching up. This is where their friendship starts." The song in particular subtext had numerous layers developed into it, based on the scenes and the outcome.

Camille and Ducol produced several songs for Jessi's character, before Gomez's casting. They had written the bedroom scene that shifted to a techno punk song, and another being punkier and more rebellious, which Ducol stated "We had another song even punkier than this one and very rebellious. The first one was more like she wanted to rebel and second one was "I'm rebelling."" However, when Gomez was cast in the role and with her meeting Audiard, the latter eventually told the composers on the need for another song, where it tells the story of a woman and not as the actress, adding that the song to carry something fresh for Gomez's character and bringing life to her role. They watched Gomez's documentary Selena Gomez: My Mind & Me (2022), a film that explored Gomez's real-life mental health struggles, and this inspired them to write the original song "Mi Camino".

== Releases ==
=== EP ===
Emilia Pérez (Selections from the Original Motion Picture Soundtrack)

EP by Clément Ducol and Camille
- Released: 5 September 2024
- Length: 16:29
- Label: Sony Masterworks

Before the soundtrack's release, an extended play which featured selections from the film's forthcoming soundtrack was released on 5 September 2024, prior to the film's Toronto International Film Festival premiere.

Emilia Pérez (Selections from the Original Motion Picture Soundtrack) track listing
No.	Title	Performers	Length
1.	"El Alegato"	Zoe Saldaña	3:35
2.	"Para"	Aitza Terán and Iván Ruiz De Velasco	2:49
3.	"Papa"	Juan Pablo Monterrubio and Karla Sofia Gascón	2:21
4.	"El Mal"	Zoe Saldaña, Karla Sofia Gascón and Camille	3:39
5.	"Las Damas que Pasan"	Adriana Paz	4:05
Total length:			16:29

=== Soundtrack album ===
Emilia Pérez (Original Motion Picture Soundtrack)

Soundtrack album by Clément Ducol and Camille
- Released: 31 October 2024
- Length: 92:18
- Language: Spanish
- Label: Sony Masterworks

The soundtrack album was released on 31 October 2024, a day prior to the US limited theatrical release. It featured the original songs and score composed by Camille and Clément Ducol, which consisted of 43 tracks running for over one-and-a-half hours. A music video of Gomez performing the song "Mi Camino" was released on the same date.

Emilia Pérez (Original Motion Picture Soundtrack) track listing
No.	Title	Performers	Length
1.	"El Alegato"	Zoe Saldaña	3:33
2.	"Todo y Nada"	Zoe Saldaña	2:16
3.	"El Encuentro"	Karla Sofía Gascón	1:13
4.	"La Vaginoplastia"	Zoe Saldaña	2:34
5.	"Lady"	Zoe Saldaña and Mark Ivanir	2:46
6.	"Deseo"	Camille and Karla Sofia Gascón	2:34
7.	"Por Casualidad"	Camille, Karla Sofia Gascón and Zoe Saldaña	2:06
8.	"Bienvenida"	Selena Gomez	2:14
9.	"Mis Siete Hermanas y Yo"	Xiomara Ahumada Quito	1:49
10.	"Papá"	Juan Pablo Monterrubio and Karla Sofia Gascón	2:22
11.	"Para"	Aitza Terán and Iván Ruiz de Velasco	2:49
12.	"El Mal"	Camille, Zoe Saldaña and Karla Sofia Gascón	3:38
13.	"El Amor"	Camille, Karla Sofia Gascón and Adriana Paz	3:26
14.	"Mi Camino"	Selena Gomez	3:44
15.	"Perdóname"	Camille and Karla Sofia Gascón	2:14
16.	"Las Damas que Pasan"	Adriana Paz	4:07
17.	"Fierro Viejo" (choir version)	Camille	1:10
18.	"El Alegato" (piano version)	Camille, Zoe Saldaña and Karla Sofia Gascón	1:30
19.	"Subiendo (Part 1)"	Camille and Clément Ducol	2:29
20.	"Fierro Viejo / La Ciudad"	Camille	1:47
21.	"Fantasmas"	Camille	0:25
22.	"El Rapto"	Camille and Clément Ducol	1:52
23.	"Claroscuro (Part 1)"	Clément Ducol	2:01
24.	"Claroscuro (Part 2)"	Karla Sofia Gascón and Mark Ivanir	1:54
25.	"El Rayo"	Clément Ducol	0:38
26.	"El Despertar"	Camille	1:44
27.	"Subiendo (Part 2)"	Camille	2:04
28.	"Cara a Cara"	Clément Ducol	1:05
29.	"Desire" (alternate version)	Camille	1:32
30.	"El Reclutamiento"	Camille and Clément Ducol	1:44
31.	"Disonancia (Part 1)"	Camille	1:01
32.	"Disonancia (Part 2)"	Karla Sofia Gascón	2:26
33.	"La Pelea"	Camille and Clément Ducol	2:22
34.	"El Trio"	Karla Sofia Gascón and Zoe Saldaña	2:04
35.	"3 Dedos"	Camille and Clément Ducol	2:04
36.	"Beatificación (Part 1)"	Camille and Clément Ducol	5:04
37.	"Beatificación (Part 2)"	Camille and Clément Ducol	2:19
38.	"El Fuego"	Camille	1:35
39.	"Desire"	Camille	2:06
40.	"Subiendo" (strings version)	Clément Ducol	1:05
41.	"Subiendo" (choir version)	Camille	1:01
42.	"Desire" (strings version)	Clément Ducol	1:53
43.	"Desire" (choir version)	Camille, Yadam and Paloma Pradal	1:58
Total length:			92:18

== Critical reception ==
Manohla Dargis of The New York Times wrote "The song-and-dance numbers — the score and songs are by Clément Ducol and Camille, and the choreography is by Damien Jalet — range from the intimate to the outsized and are integrated throughout." John Nugent of Empire wrote "kudos to French singer Camille and her partner Clément Ducol for writing truly original songs, staged with verve and energy". Bilge Ebiri of Vulture wrote "The songs were created by the French duo of [Camille] and Clément Ducol, and there's a hard, charging quality to the music, which reflects the style of the film."

Stephanie Zacharek of Time wrote "The musical numbers are exuberant, extravagant in feeling, without being overly polished." Dana Stevens of Slate wrote "The songs, by the French composing team Clément Ducol and Camille Dalmais, aren't exactly the kind you come out tapping your toe to—they're discursive and highly plot-specific, not unlike the use of music in Leos Carax's memorably bizarre Annette a few years back." Brian Truitt of USA Today wrote "Original songs are interspersed within the narrative in sometimes fantastical ways and mostly for character-development purposes. They tend to be more rhythmically abstract than showtunes, but by the end, you'll be humming at least one rousing melody."

However, the film's soundtrack was criticized by online users when clips of the film went viral on TikTok and Twitter. The song "La Vaginoplastia" was especially criticized by online users for its simplistic lyrics. Rolling Stone noted that the lyrics "penis to vagina" and "man to woman" represented "a laughable explanation of the medical procedure". Writing for PinkNews, trans writer Amelia Hansford noted that the film's soundtrack lacked a memorable soundtrack - "save for the laughably bad lyrics in 'La Vaginoplastia', in which Castro visits a urologist who inexplicably starts listing off facial feminisation surgery procedures after singing 'from penis to vagina' with the kind of delivery best kept for moustachioed cartoon villains in blimps."

== Awards and nominations ==
Award	Date of ceremony	Category	Recipient(s)	Result	Ref.
Academy Awards	March 2, 2025	Best Original Song	"El Mal" - Clément Ducol, Camille and Jacques Audiard	Won	
Academy Awards	March 2, 2025	Best Original Song	"Mi Camino" - Camille and Clément Ducol	Nominated	
Academy Awards	March 2, 2025	Best Original Score	Camille and Clément Ducol	Nominated	
Astra Creative Arts Awards	December 8, 2024	Best Original Song	"El Mal" - Clément Ducol, Camille and Jacques Audiard	Nominated	
Astra Creative Arts Awards	December 8, 2024	Best Original Song	"Mi Camino" - Camille, Clément Ducol and Selena Gomez	Won	
Black Reel Awards	10 February 2025	Outstanding Original Song	"El Mal" - Clément Ducol and Camille and Jacques Audiard	Nominated	
British Academy Film Awards	16 February 2025	Best Original Score	Clément Ducol and Camille	Nominated	
Cannes Film Festival	25 May 2024	Soundtrack Award	Clément Ducol and Camille	Won	
Critics' Choice Awards	February 7, 2025	Best Song	"El Mal" - Camille, Clément Ducol, Jacques Audiard	Won	
Critics' Choice Awards	February 7, 2025	Best Song	"Mi Camino" - Camille, Clément Ducol and Selena Gomez	Nominated	
Critics' Choice Awards	February 7, 2025	Best Score	Camille and Clément Ducol	Nominated	
Golden Globe Awards	5 January 2025	Best Original Score	Clément Ducol and Camille	Nominated	
Golden Globe Awards	5 January 2025	Best Original Song	"El Mal" - Camille, Clément Ducol and Jacques Audiard	Won	
Golden Globe Awards	5 January 2025	Best Original Song	"Mi Camino" - Camille and Clément Ducol	Nominated	
Heat Latin Music Awards	29 May 2025	Best Song for Videogames, Series or Movies	"Mi Camino" – Selena Gomez	Nominated	
Hollywood Music in Media Awards	20 November 2024	Best Original Song – Feature Film	"El Mal" – Clement Ducol, Camille, Jacques Audiard and Zoe Saldaña	Nominated	
Hollywood Music in Media Awards	20 November 2024	Best Original Song – Feature Film	"Mi Camino" – Clement Ducol, Camille, Selena Gomez and Édgar Ramírez	Nominated	
Hollywood Music in Media Awards	20 November 2024	Song – Onscreen Performance (Film)	"El Mal" – Zoe Saldaña	Won	
Hollywood Music in Media Awards	20 November 2024	Original Score – Feature Film	Clement Ducol and Camille	Won	
London Film Critics Circle Awards	2 February 2025	Technical Achievement Award	Clement Ducol and Camille	Nominated	
Middleburg Film Festival	20 October 2024	Special Achievement in Music Award	Clement Ducol and Camille	Won	
Satellite Awards	January 26, 2025	Best Original Song	"El Mal" - Camille, Clément Ducol, Jacques Audiard	Nominated	
Satellite Awards	January 26, 2025	Best Original Song	"Mi Camino" - Camille and Clément Ducol	Won	
Satellite Awards	January 26, 2025	Best Original Score	Camille and Clément Ducol	Won	
Society of Composers & Lyricists Awards	February 12, 2025	Outstanding Original Song for a Comedy or Musical Visual Media Production	"El Mal" - Camille, Clément Ducol, Jacques Audiard	Nominated	
Society of Composers & Lyricists Awards	February 12, 2025	Outstanding Original Song for a Comedy or Musical Visual Media Production	"Mi Camino" - Camille and Clément Ducol	Nominated	
Society of Composers & Lyricists Awards	February 12, 2025	Outstanding Original Score for a Studio Film	Camille and Clément Ducol	Nominated	
Toronto International Film Festival	15 September 2024	TIFF Variety Artisan Award	Clement Ducol and Camille	Won	

== Personnel ==
Musicians

- Clément Ducol – percussion, piano, keyboards, guitars
- Pierre-François "Titi" Dufour – drums, cello solo
- Hugues Borsarello – violin solo
- Christophe Minck – bass, double bass, keyboards, harp, n’goni
- Johan Dalgaard – piano, keyboards
- François Poggio – guitars
- Ensemble Archipel – strings

== Charts ==
Chart performance for Emilia Pérez
Chart (2025)	Peak position
UK Soundtrack Albums (Official Charts)	42
