= Mi camino =

2024 song from the film Emilia Pérez

Song by Selena Gomez

from the album Emilia Pérez
- Language: Spanish
- Released: October 31, 2024
- Genre: Pop
- Length: 3:44
- Label: Sony Masterworks
- Composers: Clément Ducol; Camille Dalmais
- Lyricists: Clément Ducol; Camille Dalmais

Music video
- "Mi Camino (Official Performance Clip)" on YouTube

"Mi camino" (lit. transl. "My Path") is a Spanish-language song performed by American actress and singer Selena Gomez for the 2024 French musical crime film Emilia Pérez, in which she portrays Jessi, the title character's wife; it appears as track fourteen on the film's soundtrack album. Written and produced by Clément Ducol and Camille, the song won Best Original Song at the 29th Satellite Awards, and was nominated for the Academy Award for Best Original Song, the Critics' Choice Movie Award for Best Song and the Golden Globe Award for Best Original Song. A clip from the film featuring Gomez performing the song with Édgar Ramírez was released on October 31, 2024, the same day as the film's soundtrack.

Camille released her own version of the song and an English-language version on March 12, 2025, both appearing on the EP Camille Sings Emilia.

== Composition ==
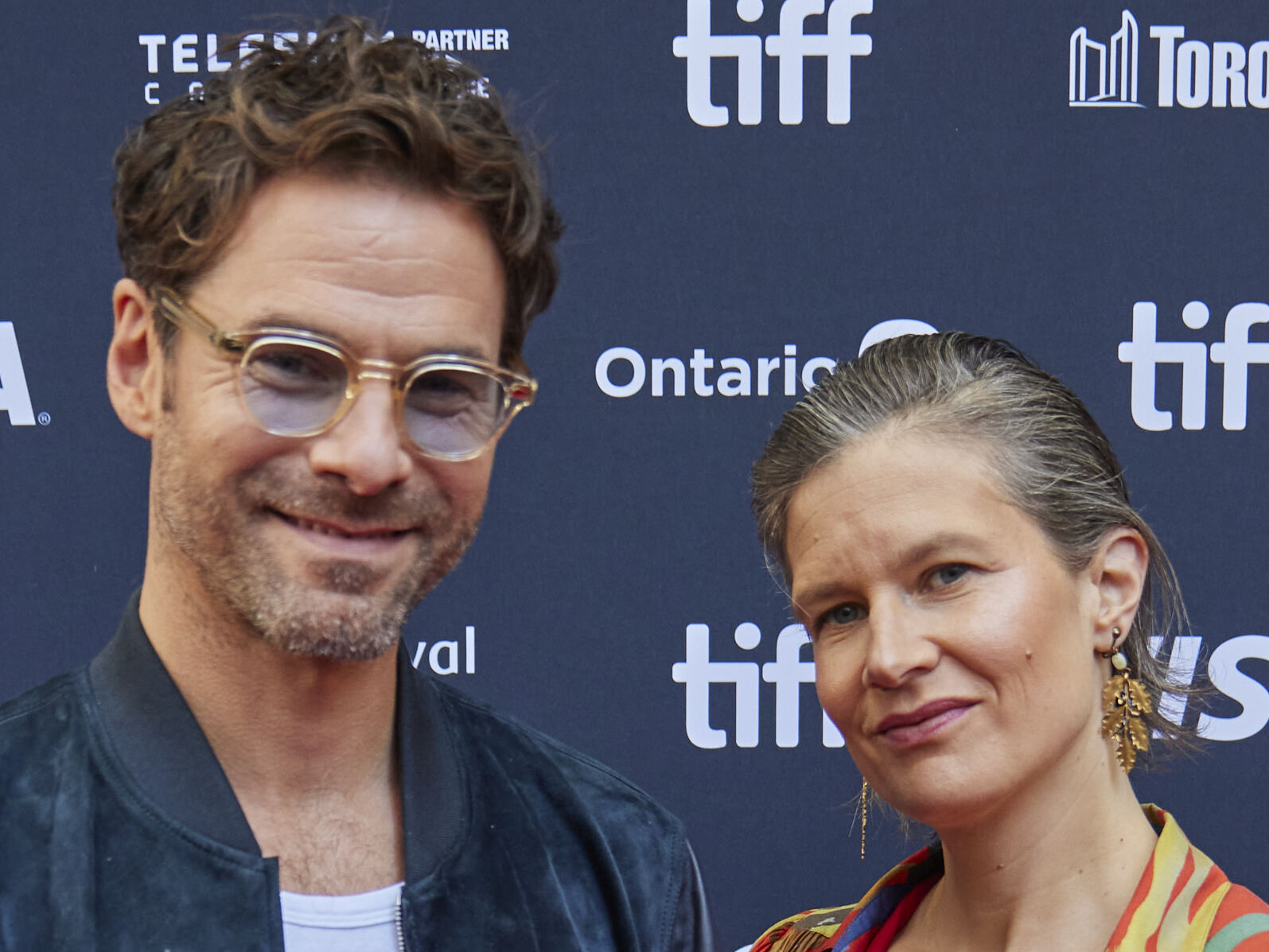
Ducol and Dalmais, co-writers of the song.

Before the role of Jessi was cast, Clément Ducol and Camille drafted several songs for the cartel boss's wife but found them too similar. After Selena Gomez joined the film, director Jacques Audiard asked for a new piece that would "bring something from [Gomez]'s life" and feel "much deeper" and "more sentimental". Drawing on the documentary Selena Gomez: My Mind & Me (2022), a film that explored Gomez's real-life mental health struggles, the composers wrote "Mi camino" in a few hours, unlike other numbers such as "El Mal", which went through numerous versions. They tailored the song to Gomez's voice, testing multiple keys before she chose a higher register for herself.

At the 51st Telluride Film Festival, Gomez said the song was "actually a totally different song" at first, with "a bit more of a rough sound", and that working closely with Camille it "became almost like a ballad", "more of a story about a woman and phases of life". Musically, the track evolved from an intimate sketch to a vintage nightclub style, in line with Audiard's idea of an '80s-style hit, incorporating live orchestral writing, Latin percussion, layered choir vocals, and synthesizers. In the film, the song is performed in a karaoke setting and serves as a turning point for Jessi.

== Accolades ==
Awards and nominations for "Mi camino"
Organization	Year	Category	Result	Ref.
Academy Awards	2025	Best Original Song	Nominated	
Astra Film and Creative Arts Awards	2024	Best Original Song	Won	
Critics' Choice Movie Awards	2025	Best Song	Nominated	
Golden Globe Awards	2025	Best Original Song	Nominated	
Heat Latin Music Awards	2025	Best Song for Videogames, Series or Movies	Nominated	
Hollywood Music in Media Awards	2024	Original Song – Feature Film	Nominated	
Satellite Awards	2025	Best Original Song	Won	
Society of Composers & Lyricists Awards	2025	Outstanding Original Song for a Comedy or Musical Visual Media Production	Nominated	

== Release history ==
Release dates and formats for "Mi camino"
Region	Date	Format	Version	Label	Ref.
Various	October 31, 2024	Digital download; streaming	Original	Sony Masterworks	
