= 3rd Astra Creative Arts Awards =

Astra Creative Arts Awards

- Date: December 8, 2024
- Site: Taglyan Complex, Los Angeles
- Hosted by: Peter Kim
- Official website: theastras.com

Highlights
- Most awards: Wicked (4)
- Most nominations: Dune: Part Two / Wicked (12)

Television coverage
- Network: KNEKT Television Network; YouTube (@TheAstraAwards)

The 3rd Astra Creative Arts Awards, presented by the Hollywood Creative Alliance, recognized technical achievements in films of 2024. The ceremony took place on December 8, 2024, at the Taglyan Complex in Los Angeles, California.

== Ceremony information ==
The epic science fiction film Dune: Part Two and the musical fantasy film Wicked led the nominations with twelve each, followed by Gladiator II with seven. Wicked also received eight film award nominations, bringing the film's nomination total to a record-breaking 20.

The nominations for both the film awards and the film creative arts awards were announced on November 25, 2024. Both ceremonies will be recorded and streamed live on KNEKT.tv and YouTube. The winners for the Creative Arts Awards will be announced at a luncheon preceding the evening Film Awards dinner. Actor and comedian Peter Kim will host the Astra Creative Arts Awards while comedian Loni Love will host the Astra Film Awards.

== Winners and nominees ==
Winners will be listed first and highlighted with boldface.

**Best Casting**: **Tiffany Little Canfield and Bernard Telsey – Wicked**; Barbara Giordani, Nina Gold, Francesco Vedovati, and Martin Ware – Conclave; Francine Maisler – Dune: Part Two; Christel Baras and Carla Hool – Emilia Pérez; John Papsidera – Saturday Night; Laure Cochener and Léa Moszkowicz – The Substance	**Best Cinematography**: **Greig Fraser – Dune: Part Two**; Sayombhu Mukdeeprom – Challengers; Jomo Fray – Nickel Boys; Jarin Blaschke – Nosferatu; Lol Crawley – The Brutalist; Alice Brooks – Wicked
**Best Costume Design**: **Paul Tazewell – Wicked**; Colleen Atwood – Beetlejuice Beetlejuice; Jacqueline West – Dune: Part Two; Jenny Beavan – Furiosa: A Mad Max Saga; David Crossman and Janty Yates – Gladiator II; Linda Muir – Nosferatu	**Best Film Editing**: **Marco Costa – Challengers**; Sean Baker – Anora; Nick Emerson – Conclave; Joe Walker – Dune: Part Two; Nathan Orloff and Shane Reid – Saturday Night; Myron Kerstein – Wicked
**Best Makeup and Hairstyling**: **The Substance**; Beetlejuice Beetlejuice; Dune: Part Two; Furiosa: A Mad Max Saga; Nosferatu; Wicked	**Best Marketing Campaign**: **Wicked – Universal Pictures**; Beetlejuice Beetlejuice – Warner Bros. Pictures; Challengers – Amazon MGM Studios; Dune: Part Two – Warner Bros. Pictures; Gladiator II – Paramount Pictures; The Fall Guy – Universal Pictures
**Best Original Score**: **Clément Ducol and Camille – Emilia Pérez**; Daniel Blumberg – The Brutalist; Hans Zimmer – Dune: Part Two; Kris Bowers – The Wild Robot; John Powell and Stephen Schwartz – Wicked; Trent Reznor and Atticus Ross – Challengers	**Best Production Design**: **Nathan Crowley and Lee Sandales – Wicked**; Suzie Davies – Conclave; Patrice Vermette and Shane Vieau – Dune: Part Two; Arthur Max, Jille Azis, and Elli Griff – Gladiator II; Craig Lathrop – Nosferatu; Judy Becker – The Brutalist
**Best Sound**: **Dune: Part Two**; A Quiet Place: Day One; Challengers; Furiosa: A Mad Max Saga; Gladiator II; Wicked	**Best Visual Effects**: **Dune: Part Two**; Beetlejuice Beetlejuice; Furiosa: A Mad Max Saga; Gladiator II; Twisters; Wicked
**Best Stunts**: **The Fall Guy**; Deadpool & Wolverine; Dune: Part Two; Furiosa: A Mad Max Saga; Gladiator II; Wicked	**Best Stunt Coordinator**: **Chris O'Hara – The Fall Guy**; George Cottle – Deadpool & Wolverine; Lee Morrison – Dune: Part Two; Guy Norris – Furiosa: A Mad Max Saga; Nikki Berwick – Gladiator II; Jo McLaren – Wicked
**Best Original Song**: **"Mi Camino" from Emilia Pérez performed by Selena Gomez**; "Compress/Regress" from Challengers performed by Trent Reznor and Atticus Ross; "El Mal" from Emilia Pérez performed by Camille, Karla Sofía Gascón, and Zoe Saldaña; "Harper and Will Go West" from Will & Harper performed by Kristen Wiig; "Kiss the Sky" from The Wild Robot performed by Maren Morris; "Piece by Piece" from Piece by Piece performed by Pharrell Williams

== Films with multiple wins ==
The following films received multiple awards:

Wins	Film
4	Wicked
3	Dune: Part Two
2	Emilia Pérez
2	The Fall Guy

== Films with multiple nominations ==
The following films received multiple nominations:

Nominations	Film
12	Dune: Part Two
12	Wicked
7	Gladiator II
6	Challengers
6	Furiosa: A Mad Max Saga
4	Beetlejuice Beetlejuice
4	Emilia Pérez
3	The Brutalist
3	Conclave
3	The Fall Guy
2	Deadpool & Wolverine
2	Nosferatu
2	Saturday Night
2	The Substance
2	The Wild Robot

== See also ==
- 4th Astra TV Awards
- 8th Astra Film Awards
- 7th Astra Midseason Movie Awards
