= El Mal (song) =

2024 song from the film Emilia Pérez

Song by Zoe Saldaña, Karla Sofía Gascón and Camille

from the album Emilia Pérez
- Genre: Rap rock
- Length: 3:39
- Label: Sony Masterworks
- Composers: Clément Ducol; Camille Dalmais
- Lyricists: Clément Ducol; Camille Dalmais; Jacques Audiard

Music video
- "El Mal" on YouTube

"El Mal" (lit. transl. "The Evil") is a Spanish-language song featured in the 2024 French film Emilia Pérez. Written by Clément Ducol and Camille, with Emilia Pérez writer and director Jacques Audiard co-writing the lyrics, it is performed in-character by actresses Zoe Saldaña and Karla Sofía Gascón, with Camille providing backing vocals. A rap rock song, it sees Saldaña's character reflect on the hypocrisy of criminals contributing to the nonprofit organization founded by Gascón's character Emilia Pérez as the latter simultaneously gives a public speech to said criminals during an event dedicated to helping people.

Singled out as one of the film's best songs, "El Mal" received multiple film award-related nominations. "El Mal" won the Academy Award for Best Original Song, the Critics' Choice Movie Award for Best Song, and the Golden Globe Award for Best Original Song. Additionally, Saldaña, who won an Academy Award for her performance in the film, won the Hollywood Music in Media Award for Best Song – Onscreen Performance (Film) for her "El Mal" performance.

== Background ==
Emilia Pérez is a 2024 French musical film. The plot revolves around the titular character, originally named Juan "Manitas" Del Monte, a drug lord from Monterrey (both roles portrayed by Karla Sofía Gascón). Manitas contacts Rita Mora Castro (played by Zoe Saldaña), an underappreciated attorney living in Mexico City, seeking her help to disappear and transition into a woman. Manitas is also married to Jessi (played by Selena Gomez), with whom he has two children. Rita completes the task, and Manitas is reported dead, while Jessi and the children are exiled to Lausanne, Switzerland, "for security reasons". Four years later, in London, Emilia contacts Rita again, requesting her assistance in bringing back her children. Jessi and the children are told that returning to Mexico is safe and that Emilia, Manitas' cousin, will welcome them into her home.

Emilia convinces Rita to stay in Mexico, offering to cover her expenses. One day, they visit a tianguis, where they meet a mother searching for her missing son. Emilia uses her contacts to gather information about him so the mother can find closure. They eventually locate his body in a mass grave. Moved by her children's longing for their father, Emilia creates a nonprofit organization called La Lucecita, supported by other remorseful cartel members. The organization receives donations, some of which come from dangerous and corrupt individuals—Emilia's only contacts when founding the organization. The musical number "El Mal" reflects on this situation.

== Composition ==
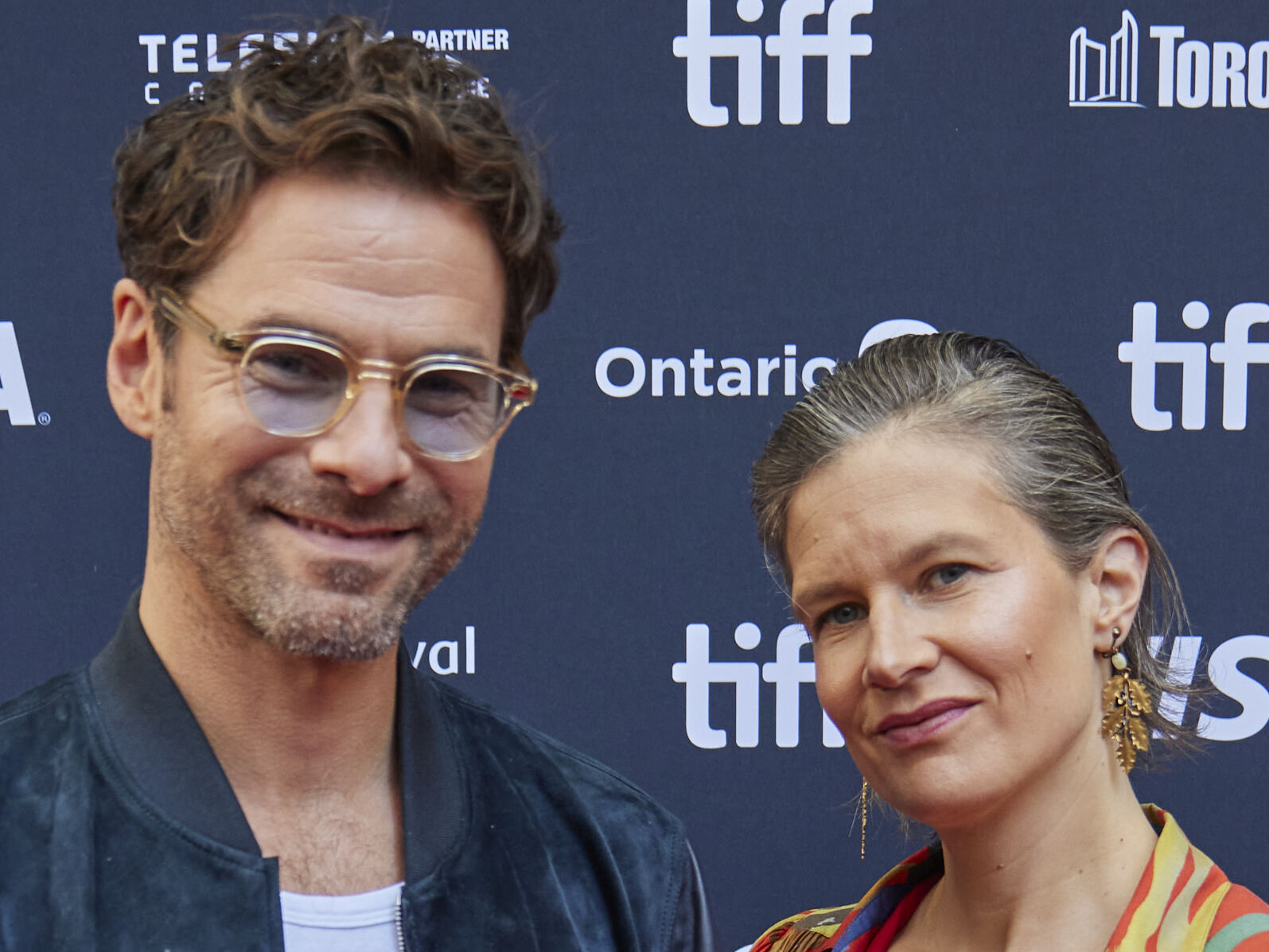
Ducol and Dalmais, co-writers of the song.

"El Mal" was composed during the pre-production with Camille performing a rough scratch. After the duo met Saldaña, she helped them by providing the right arrangement for the music. Saldaña's version consisted of a fusion of genres but with an electronic arrangement, which begins with a "rapid-fire nonsense representation of [Bob Dylan's 1965 song] 'Subterranean Homesick Blues'" and a "more funky, more ironic, kind of Talking Heads" ending with a hip-hop tune. Audiard, however, felt that the song should be more acoustic and rougher. They then redid the song with a live rock band, that suited Saldaña's vocals. Camille added that Saldaña had a "super rhythmical and sharp voice" which suited her character and the song as well. "El Mal" was deciphered as a driving condemnation of murderers, politicians who contributed to the drug cartel, and the victims' perils were described in the song lyrics, which Camille, repeating those lyrics over and over and "felt like throwing up". Ducol further described the context of the song, adding:

"What I like in 'El Mal' is that we are talking about things that are quite harsh, and all of a sudden, we find ourselves before a true musical number, and we understand we are no longer in reality-based cinema. There's dancing, and there's singing, and there's jumping up and down on tables, and all of the other characters become like puppets in Japanese [theatre]. The viewer gains awareness of the story at a deeper level".

== Critical reception ==
Stephanie Zacharek mentioned in Time that the musical number is inspired by Bollywood films, with its theme highlighting the hypocrisy of donors attending a benefit dinner meant to help eradicate the crimes they commit, an opinion shared by her colleague Lucy Ford. Similarly, Michael Ordoña from the Los Angeles Times describes "El Mal" as a "showstopping, rock-rap denunciation of poisonous hypocrisy". Critic Carlos Sousa in The New York Sun thought Saldaña's performance of the song "might just be the film’s high point."

Amelia Hansford from PinkNews praised the musical theme's cinematography as well as Saldaña's performance, but criticized that the scene only "mask[s] the film's failings at tackling serious themes it's ill-equipped to handle". Josh Kerwick noted in his Star Observer review that "El Mal" exemplifies the film's "few highs and many lows". He pointed out that the musical number reveals the corruption surrounding the film's plot for the first time, but following the performance, it is never addressed again.

=== Accolades ===
Organization	Year	Category	Result	Ref.
Academy Awards	2025	Best Original Song	Won	
Astra Creative Arts Awards	2024	Best Original Song	Nominated	
Black Reel Awards	2025	Outstanding Original Song	Nominated	
Critics' Choice Movie Awards	2025	Best Song	Won	
Golden Globe Awards	2025	Best Original Song	Won	
Hollywood Music in Media Awards	2024	Best Original Song in a Feature Film	Nominated	
Hollywood Music in Media Awards	2024	Song – Onscreen Performance (Film) (Note: Zoe Saldaña was the recipient.)	Won	
Satellite Awards	2025	Best Original Song	Nominated	
Society of Composers & Lyricists Awards	2025	Outstanding Original Song for a Comedy or Musical Visual Media Production	Nominated	
World Soundtrack Awards	2025	Best Original Song	Won	
