= Disclaimer (TV series) =

2024 psychological thriller miniseries

- Release poster
- Genre: Psychological thriller; Erotic thriller; Drama
- Based on: Disclaimer by Renée Knight
- Written by: Alfonso Cuarón
- Directed by: Alfonso Cuarón
- Starring: Cate Blanchett; Kevin Kline; Sacha Baron Cohen; Lesley Manville; Louis Partridge; Leila George; Kodi Smit-McPhee
- Narrated by: Indira Varma; Kevin Kline
- Composer: Finneas O'Connell
- Countries of origin: United States; Australia; Mexico
- Original languages: English; Italian
- No. of episodes: 7

Production
- Executive producers: Alfonso Cuarón; Cate Blanchett; Gabriela Rodríguez; David Levine; Steve Golin; Emmanuel Lubezki; Donald Sabourin; Carlos Morales
- Production locations: London; Italy
- Cinematography: Emmanuel Lubezki; Bruno Delbonnel
- Editors: Alfonso Cuarón; Adam Gough
- Running time: 45–55 minutes
- Production companies: Esperanto Filmoj; Anonymous Content; Apple Studios

Original release
- Network: Apple TV+
- Release: October 11 – November 8, 2024

Disclaimer (stylized as Disclaimer*) is a 2024 psychological erotic thriller miniseries created, written, edited, and directed by Alfonso Cuarón, based on the 2015 novel of the same name by Renée Knight. It stars Cate Blanchett and Leila George as documentarian Catherine Ravenscroft, and Kevin Kline as an elderly widower who forces Ravenscroft to confront her past. The supporting cast includes Sacha Baron Cohen, Kodi Smit-McPhee, Louis Partridge and Lesley Manville, with Indira Varma as narrator.

Disclaimer made its debut at the 81st Venice International Film Festival before premiering on Apple TV+ on October 11, 2024, with its first two episodes. It received generally positive reviews from critics. Both Kline and Blanchett garnered nominations at the Golden Globes, SAG, Critics Choice, and Satellite Awards; Blanchett would later receive an Emmy nomination.

== Premise ==
Catherine Ravenscroft, a prominent British documentary-journalist, discovers she is a prominent character in a novel that purports to reveal a secret she has tried to keep hidden.

The story is revealed in a non-linear fashion with scenes alternating between a holiday in Italy (young Catherine’s encounter with Jonathan) and back home in London twenty years later (the truth emerges). The series also uses the technique of unreliable narrator in that the events in Italy are told twice: first from Nancy's speculative point of view and later from Catherine's first person experience.

== Cast ==
=== Main ===
- Cate Blanchett as Catherine Ravenscroft, an Australian award-winning journalist and documentarian.
  - Leila George as a younger version of Catherine Ravenscroft, during a holiday in Italy with her family twenty years prior.
- Kevin Kline as Stephen Brigstocke, a retired private school teacher who harbors a grudge against Catherine.
- Sacha Baron Cohen as Robert Ravenscroft, Catherine's English husband who runs a corrupt non-profit company.
  - Adam El Hagar as young Robert
- Lesley Manville as Nancy Brigstocke, Stephen's late wife.
- Louis Partridge as Jonathan Brigstocke, Stephen and Nancy's late son who met Catherine in Italy twenty years prior.
- Indira Varma as Narrator
- Kodi Smit-McPhee as Nicholas Ravenscroft, Catherine and Robert's aimless, drug-addled son.
  - Twins Bertie and George Haarer as child Nicholas

=== Guest ===
- Art Malik as Justin, Stephen's publisher and former colleague
- Liv Hill as Sasha, Jonathan's girlfriend
- Christiane Amanpour as herself
- HoYeon Jung as Jisoo Kim, Catherine's South Korean assistant
- Michael Spicer as Simon, Catherine's colleague
- Gemma Jones as Helen, Catherine's mother who has dementia
- Youssef Kerkour as DI Richard Perkins, who sent to Italy to help Stephen and Nancy after Jonathan's death

== Episodes ==
No.	Title	Directed by	Teleplay by	Original release date
1	"I"	Alfonso Cuarón	Alfonso Cuarón	October 11, 2024
Celebrated documentarian Catherine Ravenscroft receives a package containing a book titled The Perfect Stranger. Horrified by its contents, Catherine sets the book on fire before finishing it, telling her husband Robert that she believes the story to be about her. Flashbacks show that the book was sent to Catherine by Stephen Brigstocke, a retired teacher grieving the deaths of his wife Nancy and son Jonathan. Stephen finds a manuscript of the book in Nancy's belongings, alongside a collection of photos taken by Jonathan during his trip to Italy 20 years before, which includes erotic photos of a young Catherine. Stephen publishes the book and sends it to Catherine as revenge for Jonathan's death, for which he holds her responsible. Another series of flashbacks to 2001 shows Jonathan arriving in Italy with his girlfriend Sasha, who abruptly leaves when she learns her aunt has died in a car crash. Now alone, Jonathan visits a beach where he first sees and surreptitiously photographs Catherine.
2	"II"	Alfonso Cuarón	Alfonso Cuarón	October 11, 2024
Stephen is shown to have visited Catherine's estranged, wayward son, Nicholas, at the department store where he works, to discreetly deliver him a copy of The Perfect Stranger. Another flashback shows Catherine visiting Nancy, who is dying of cancer and berates Catherine for her role in Jonathan's death. She demands to meet Nicholas, telling Catherine that he would not be alive if not for Jonathan; Catherine refuses and leaves in a panic. In the present, Stephen delivers a copy of the book to Robert's office via his secretary, also including copies of Jonathan's photos. A disgusted Robert recognizes the photos from his and Catherine's vacation in Italy 20 years ago. Robert confronts Catherine with the photos, believing her to have had an affair after he was called away from the trip for work. A tearful Catherine says that the man who took the photos died. Before she can explain further, Robert angrily storms out of the house with the book and drives away.
3	"III"	Alfonso Cuarón	Alfonso Cuarón	October 18, 2024
Robert spends the night drinking and sleeping in his car. The next day, he ignores Catherine's calls and skips work to read The Perfect Stranger. Catherine leaves a voicemail for Stephen sympathizing with his grief but asserting that the book is a fiction. Stephen learns that the book has gained popularity since its publication. In 2001, Jonathan befriends Catherine by helping her bring a young Nicholas and her belongings back to her hotel. Catherine invites Jonathan for a drink in the hotel restaurant and aggressively flirts with him. She brings him to her room and guides him through how to pleasure her, culminating in passionate sex. Days later, the police inform a devastated Stephen and Nancy that Jonathan died of an accidental drowning at the beach. The couple travels to Italy to identify their son's body, and Nancy secretly collects the film stock in Jonathan's camera.
4	"IV"	Alfonso Cuarón	Alfonso Cuarón	October 18, 2024
Catherine is horrified to discover The Perfect Stranger in her local bookstore while Robert later kicks her out of the house. In flashbacks to the years after Jonathan's death, a grieving Nancy moves into Jonathan's room and secretly begins writing The Perfect Stranger while dying of cancer. In 2001, Jonathan has Catherine pose for his photos during their tryst, and the two have sex again the next day in a beach cabana. Jonathan tells Catherine he is in love with her and has already bought a ticket to London to be with her, but Catherine tells him they cannot be together. Nicholas, left unattended, takes his inflatable dinghy into the water, and the current takes him far into the sea. Jonathan rushes in to save him, followed by a number of lifeguards and beachgoers. Nicholas is successfully rescued, but Catherine sees Jonathan drowning in the distance and neglects to alert anyone; by the time the lifeguards take notice and bring him ashore, Jonathan has already died.
5	"V"	Alfonso Cuarón	Alfonso Cuarón	October 25, 2024
Catherine goes to stay with her mother Helen, who suffers from dementia, and tells her the full truth of her past while she sleeps. Stephen visits Catherine's office with copies of The Perfect Stranger and tells Jisoo Kim, Catherine's assistant, that the book recounts Catherine's choice to leave her lover to die. By the time Catherine arrives at work, all of her co-workers have read the book and shun her. After being confronted by Jisoo, Catherine storms out and accidentally slaps her colleague, Simon, for touching her arm, which is caught on video and goes viral. Catherine knocks on Stephen's door demanding to talk to him, but he does not answer. Stephen and Robert later meet for dinner, where Robert thanks Stephen for the book and criticizes her behavior. With the help of his publisher, Stephen creates a fake Instagram page for Jonathan and uses it to message Nicholas; he eventually reveals that Jonathan is dead and that Nicholas is the boy he died saving, before sending Jonathan's photos of Catherine to Nicholas as a cross-reference with the book. A horrified Nicholas visits a drug den he frequents, and overdoses on heroin.
6	"VI"	Alfonso Cuarón	Alfonso Cuarón	November 1, 2024
Separate flashbacks reveal inaccuracies in Nancy's retelling of the events in Italy: Sasha is revealed to have left the trip after a fight with Jonathan, not because of her aunt, and Catherine recounts that she simply noticed Jonathan watching her throughout her first day alone with Nicholas, and did not actually engage with him. In the present, Nicholas is hospitalized following his overdose. Robert informs Stephen and allows him to visit the comatose Nicholas. Stephen arrives with a syringe full of cleaning chemicals, intending to kill Nicholas, only for Catherine to intervene. Following a tense fight, Robert privately apologizes to Stephen for Catherine's behavior and tells him he can visit again. That night, Catherine breaks into Stephen's house, and sits him down to hear the truth of what really happened in Italy.
7	"VII"	Alfonso Cuarón	Alfonso Cuarón	November 8, 2024
Catherine reveals to Stephen that Jonathan broke into her hotel room, held her at knifepoint, forced her to pose for his photos, then repeatedly raped her before leaving. The next day, Jonathan did indeed drown saving Nicholas; Catherine had collected physical evidence of her rape, but got rid of it after Jonathan died, wanting her memory of the experience to die with him. As Catherine finishes her story, she realizes that Stephen has drugged her tea and collapses; Stephen then returns to the hospital to kill Nicholas, but relents when he awakens and calls for his mother. Stephen, finally accepting what Catherine told him, informs Robert, who is overcome with guilt. Catherine awakens and rushes to the hospital where she reunites with her family. In the aftermath, Stephen reclaims all the copies of The Perfect Stranger, and burns them along with Jonathan's photos and Nancy's belongings. He discovers that one of the photos shows young Nicholas witnessing his mother's rape. Robert apologizes for his past mistreatment of Catherine. Unable to forgive him for what she's been through, Catherine chooses to divorce him. Some time later, Catherine reconciles with Nicholas while pondering her future.

== Production ==
In December 2021, it was announced that Alfonso Cuarón was writing and directing a series for Apple TV+, with Cate Blanchett and Kevin Kline starring and Emmanuel Lubezki and Bruno Delbonnel serving as cinematographers. In February 2022, Kodi Smit-McPhee joined the cast while Sacha Baron Cohen entered negotiations for a role. Cohen was confirmed the following month, with HoYeon Jung also added to the cast. Louis Partridge joined the cast in May, and Lesley Manville joined the next month. Leila George was added to the cast in October.

Filming for the series had begun by June 2022 in Archway, London; Tuscany, Venice, and finished production in February 2023.

== Release ==
Disclaimer was screened at the 81st Venice International Film Festival on August 29, 2024, the 2024 Toronto International Film Festival on September 9 (in the Primetime program), and the 2024 BFI London Film Festival on October 10 as a special event. It premiered on October 11, 2024, on Apple TV+, with the first two episodes available immediately and then two on October 18, 2024, then one a week, until November 8, 2024.

== Reception ==
=== Critical response ===
On review aggregator Rotten Tomatoes, the series has an approval rating of 76% with an average rating of 7.6/10, based on 102 critic reviews. The website's critics consensus reads, "An intelligent offering from a dream team of talent that also dishes some plain pulpy pleasures, Disclaimer is a dense and rewarding psychological puzzle." Metacritic calculated a weighted average of 70 out of 100 based on 32 critics, indicating "generally favorable" reviews.

=== Accolades ===
Year	Award	Category	Nominee(s)	Result	Ref.
2024	British Society of Cinematographers Awards	Best Cinematography in a Television Drama (International/Streaming)	Emmanuel Lubezki and Bruno Delbonnel	Nominated	
2024	Hollywood Music in Media Awards	Original Score – TV Show/Limited Series	Finneas O'Connell	Nominated	
2024	Hollywood Music in Media Awards	Soundtrack Album	Disclaimer	Nominated	
2025	American Cinema Editors Awards	Best Edited Limited Series	Adam Gough (for "V")	Nominated	
2025	Critics' Choice Television Awards	Best Movie/Miniseries	Disclaimer	Nominated	
2025	Critics' Choice Television Awards	Best Actor in a Movie/ Miniseries	Kevin Kline	Nominated	
2025	Critics' Choice Television Awards	Best Actress in a Movie/ Miniseries	Cate Blanchett	Nominated	
2025	Critics' Choice Television Awards	Best Supporting Actress in a Movie/Miniseries	Leila George	Nominated	
2025	Directors Guild of America Awards	Outstanding Directing – Miniseries or TV Film	Alfonso Cuarón	Nominated	
2025	Golden Globes Awards	Best Miniseries or TV Film	Disclaimer	Nominated	
2025	Golden Globes Awards	Best Actor – Miniseries or Television Film	Kevin Kline	Nominated	
2025	Golden Globes Awards	Best Actress – Miniseries or TV Film	Cate Blanchett	Nominated	
2025	Primetime Emmy Awards	Outstanding Lead Actress in a Limited or Anthology Series or Movie	Cate Blanchett	Nominated	
2025	Primetime Creative Arts Emmy Awards	Outstanding Cinematography for a Limited or Anthology Series or Movie	Emmanuel Lubezki and Bruno Delbonnel (for "I")	Nominated	
2025	Satellite Awards	Best Actress – Miniseries or TV Film	Cate Blanchett	Won	
2025	Screen Actors Guild Awards	Outstanding Male Actor in a Miniseries or Television Movie	Kevin Kline	Nominated	
2025	Screen Actors Guild Awards	Outstanding Female Actor in a Miniseries or Television Movie	Cate Blanchett	Nominated	
2025	Seoul International Drama Awards	Best Actress	Cate Blanchett	Won	
2025	Society of Composers & Lyricists Awards	Outstanding Original Score for a Television Production	Finneas O'Connell	Nominated	
2025	Television Critics Association Awards	Outstanding Achievement in Movies, Miniseries or Specials	Disclaimer	Nominated	
