= 82nd Golden Globes =

Film award ceremony in 2025

82nd Golden Globe Awards
- Official poster
- Date: January 5, 2025
- Site: The Beverly Hilton, Beverly Hills, California, U.S.
- Hosted by: Nikki Glaser
- Directed by: Glenn Weiss

Highlights
- Best Film: Drama: The Brutalist
- Best Film: Musical or Comedy: Emilia Pérez
- Best Drama Series: Shōgun
- Best Musical or Comedy Series: Hacks
- Best Miniseries or Television movie: Baby Reindeer
- Most awards: Film: Emilia Pérez (4); TV: Shōgun (4)
- Most nominations: Film: Emilia Pérez (10); TV: The Bear (5)

Television coverage
- Network: CBS; Paramount+ (streaming)
- Ratings: 10.1 million (VideoAmp); 9.3 million (Nielsen ratings)

The 82nd Golden Globe Awards was an awards ceremony that honored excellence in film and American television productions of 2024. The winners were revealed during the live telecast, airing on CBS and streaming on Paramount+ on January 5, 2025. The event was hosted by comedian Nikki Glaser, making her the first solo female host in Golden Globes history.

The nominations were announced live on December 9, 2024, at a press conference at the Beverly Hilton by actors Morris Chestnut and Mindy Kaling, following an introduction from Golden Globes president, Helen Hoenhe. Emilia Pérez, with 10 nominations, became the most nominated comedy/musical film in Golden Globes history, just 1 shy of the overall record of 11, set by Robert Altman's country music satire Nashville in the drama category in 1976. The Brutalist received the second-most in film with 7 nominations, followed by Conclave with 6. Additionally, The Bear led the television nominations with 5, followed by Only Murders in the Building and Shōgun with 4 each.

== Ceremony information ==
On August 28, 2024, comedian Nikki Glaser was announced as the host for this year's ceremony, following last year's widely criticized host, comedian Jo Koy. She is the first woman to host the Golden Globes solo. Glaser herself was nominated for Best Performance in Stand-Up Comedy on Television for her HBO comedy special, Nikki Glaser: Someday You'll Die, but lost to Netflix's Ali Wong: Single Lady.

The ceremony was held at 5:00 p.m. PST / 8:00 p.m. EST on January 5, 2025. It was broadcast live on CBS and streamed on Paramount+. Glenn Weiss and Ricky Kirshner of White Cherry Entertainment returned from last year to executive produce the ceremony, along with Dick Clark Productions.

On December 3, 2024, it was announced that the two Lifetime Achievement Awards, which were not presented last year, would return this year; however, they were presented during an untelevised gala dinner on January 3, 2025, prior to the telecast, similar to the Academy Awards' Governors Awards. The recipient of the Cecil B. DeMille Award was Viola Davis, while the Carol Burnett Award was awarded to Ted Danson.

== Winners and nominees ==
Adrien Brody, Best Actor in a Motion Picture – Drama winner

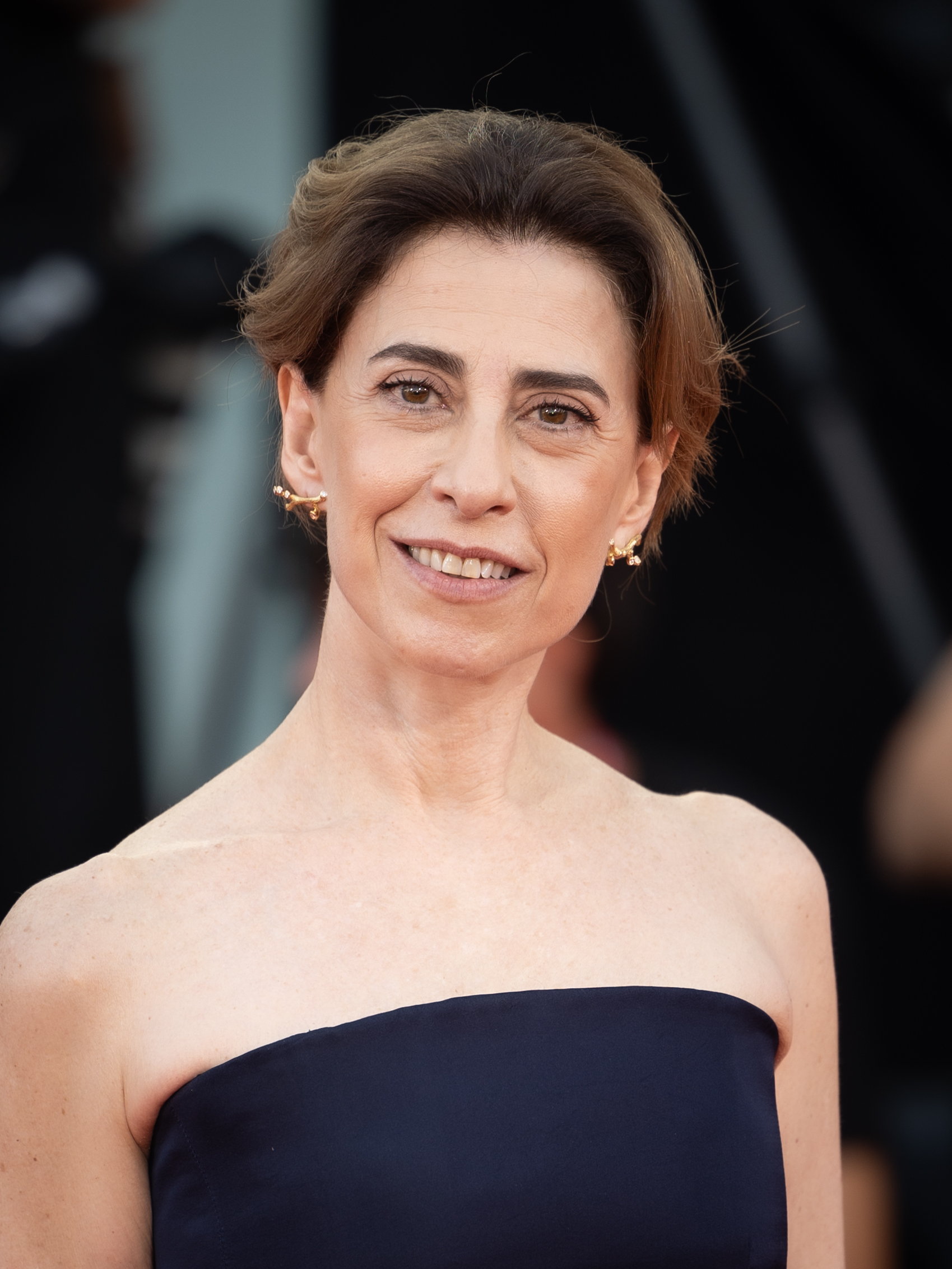
Fernanda Torres, Best Actress in a Motion Picture – Drama winner

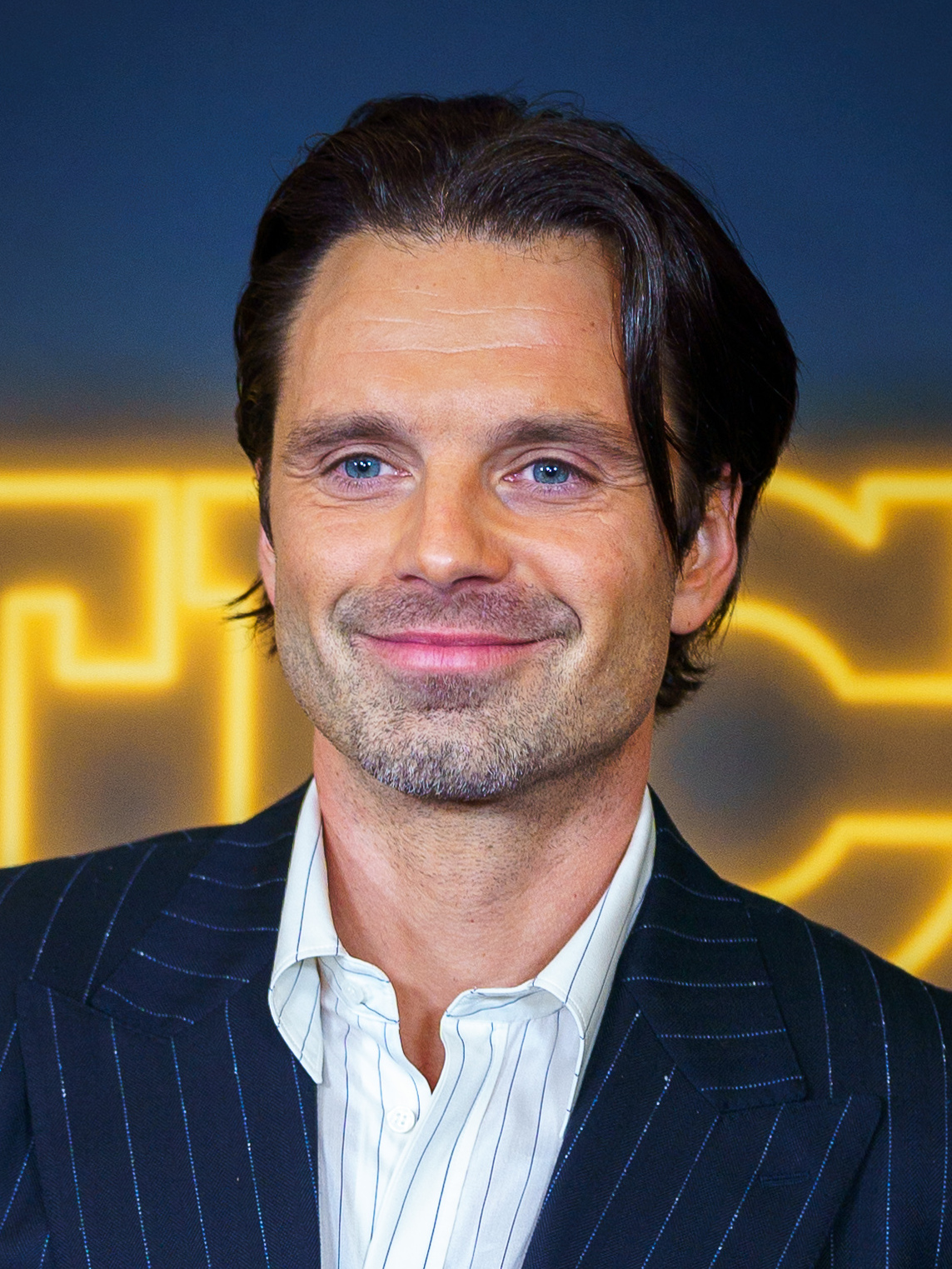
Sebastian Stan, Best Actor in a Motion Picture – Musical or Comedy winner

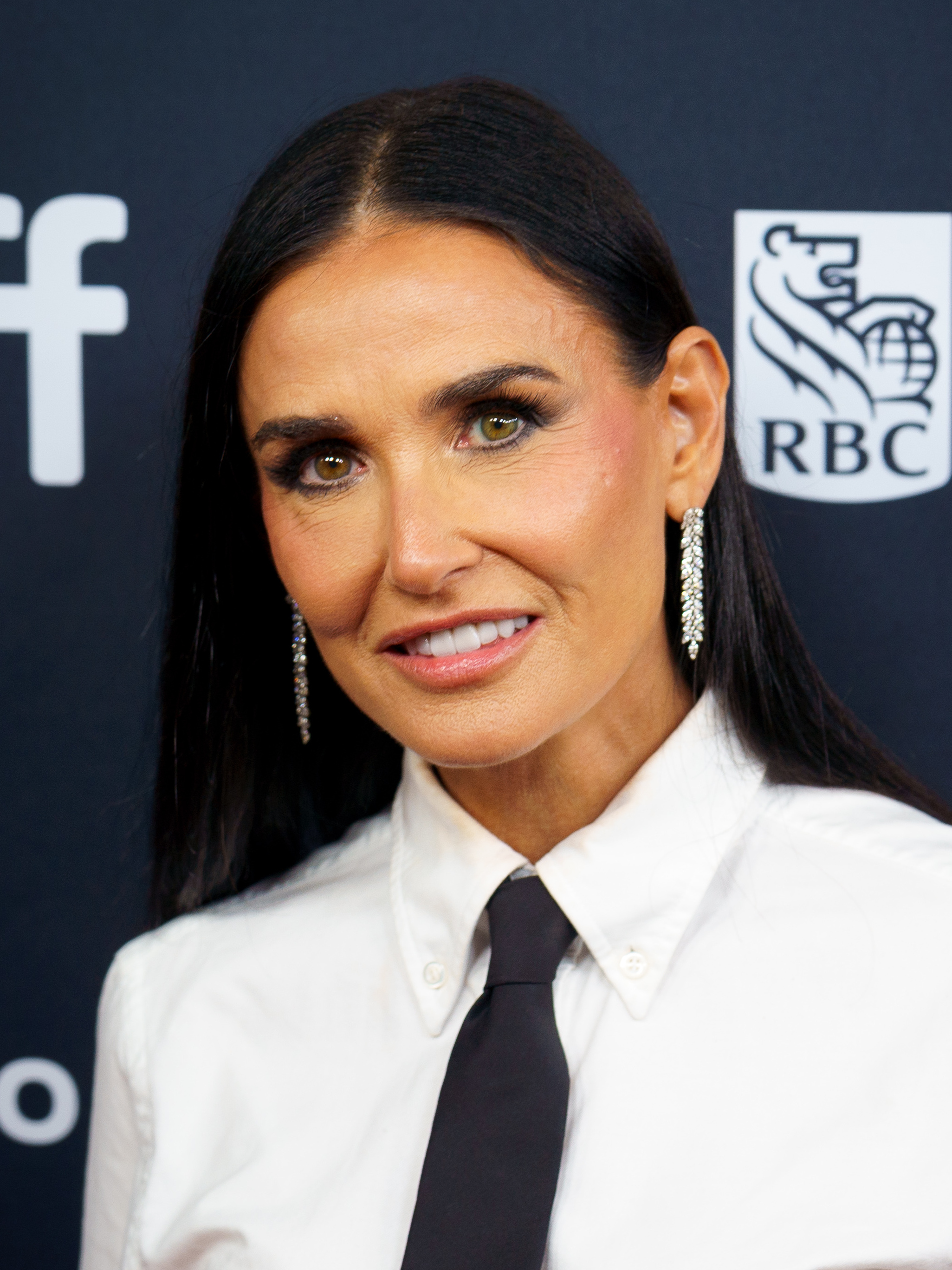
Demi Moore, Best Actress in a Motion Picture – Musical or Comedy winner

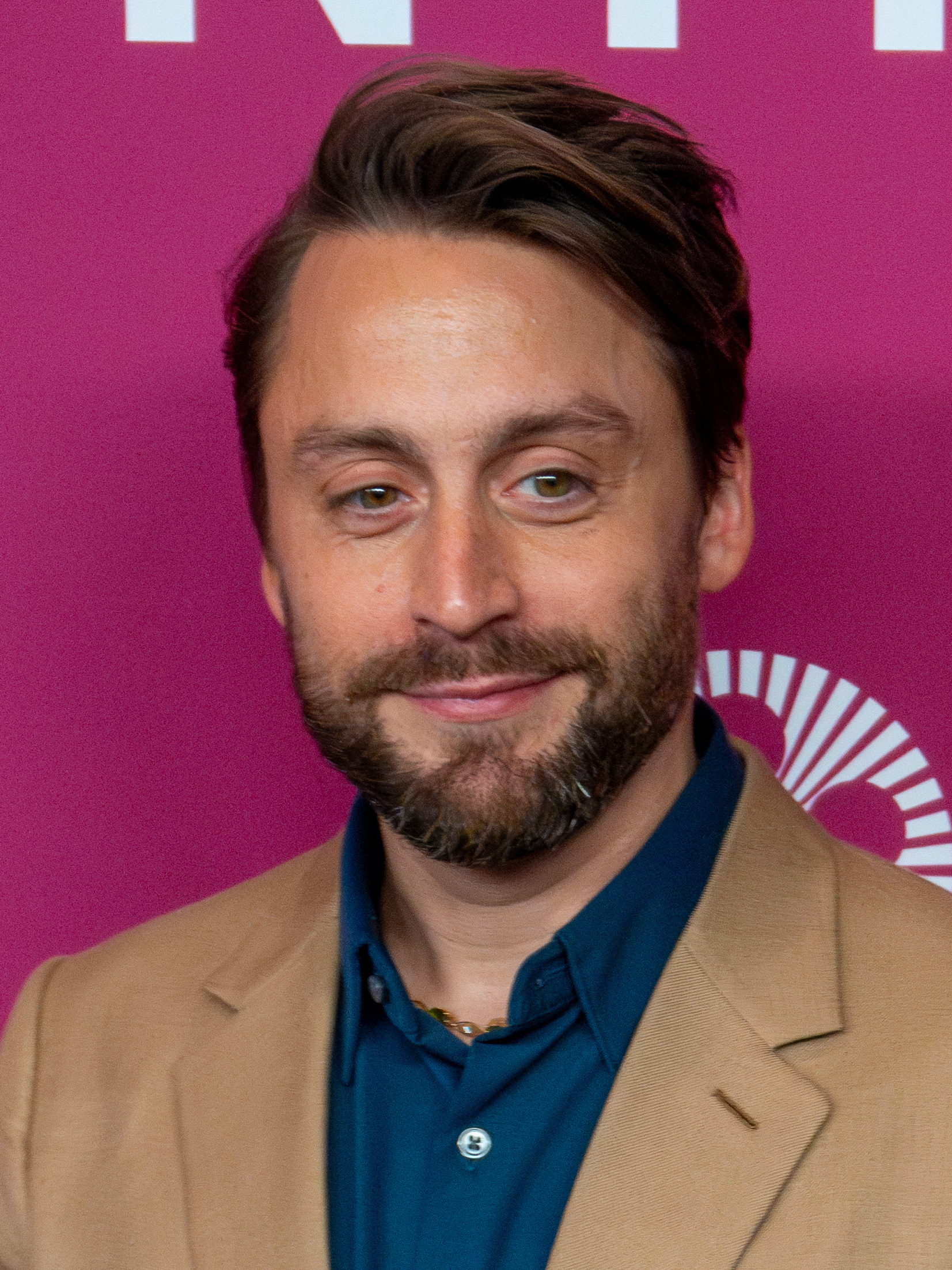
Kieran Culkin, Best Supporting Actor winner

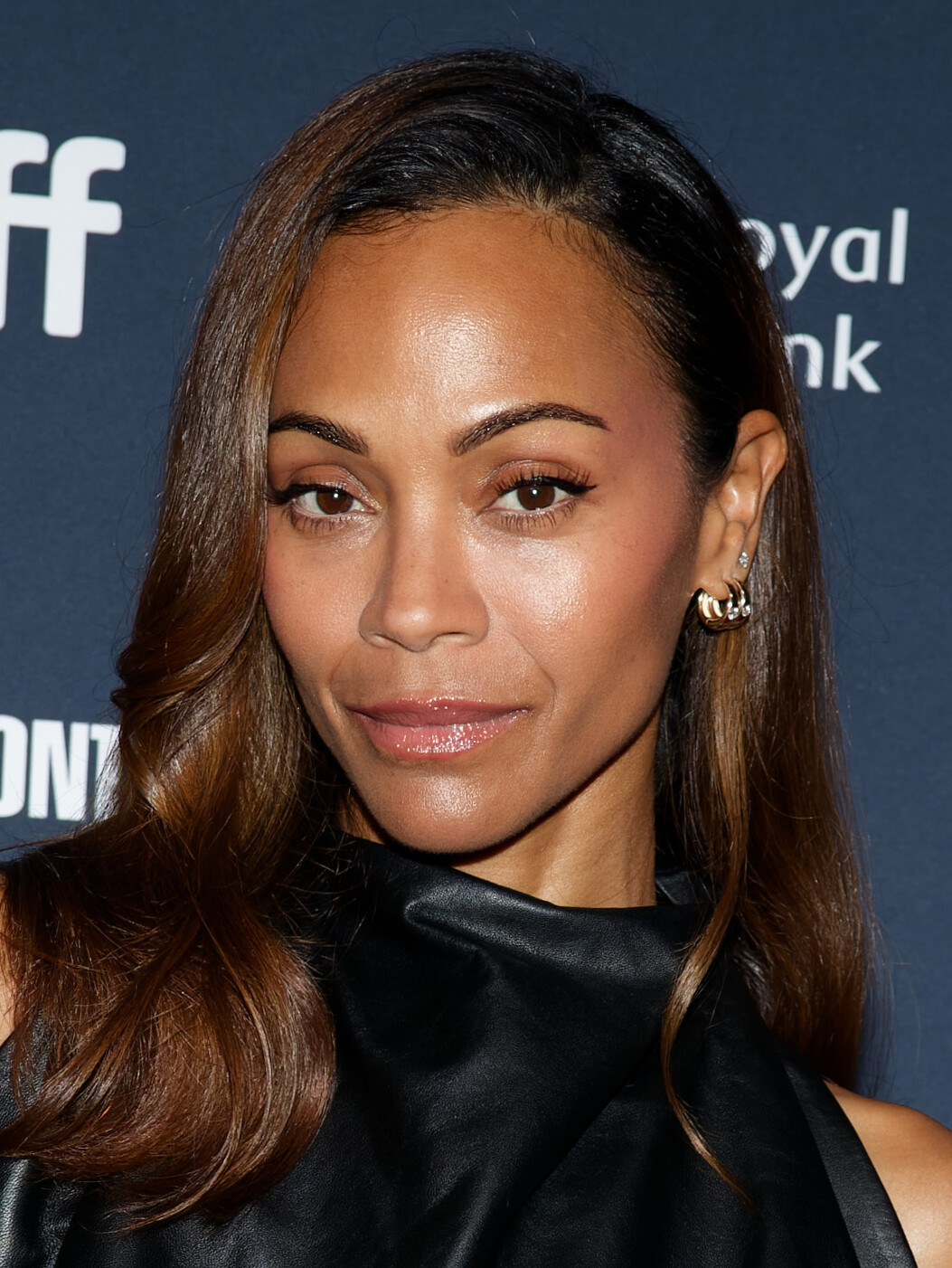
Zoe Saldaña, Best Supporting Actress winner

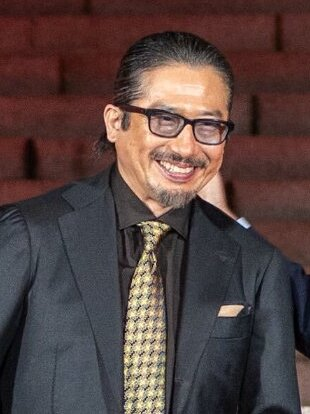
Hiroyuki Sanada, Best Actor in a Television Series – Drama winner

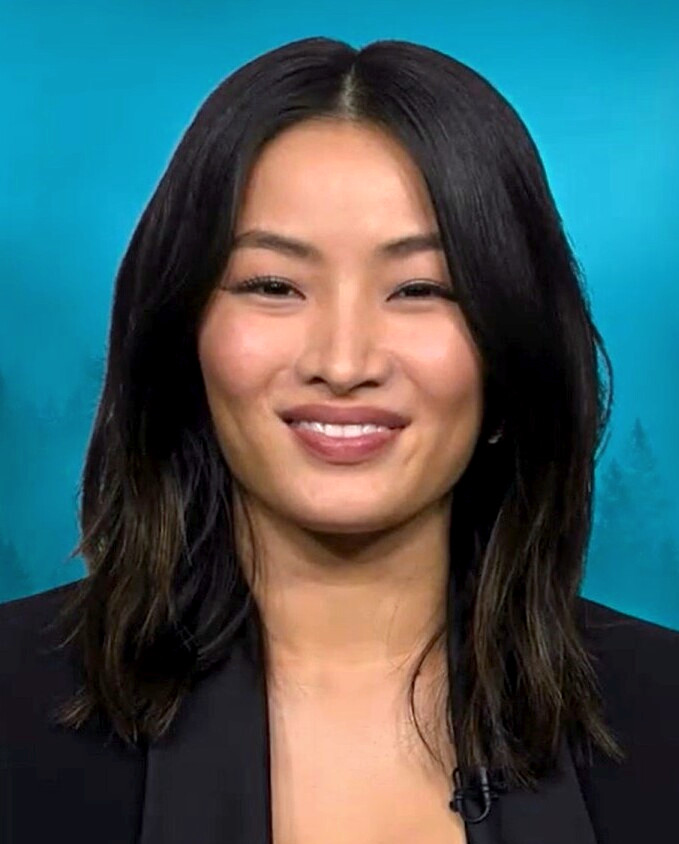
Anna Sawai, Best Actress in a Television Series – Drama winner

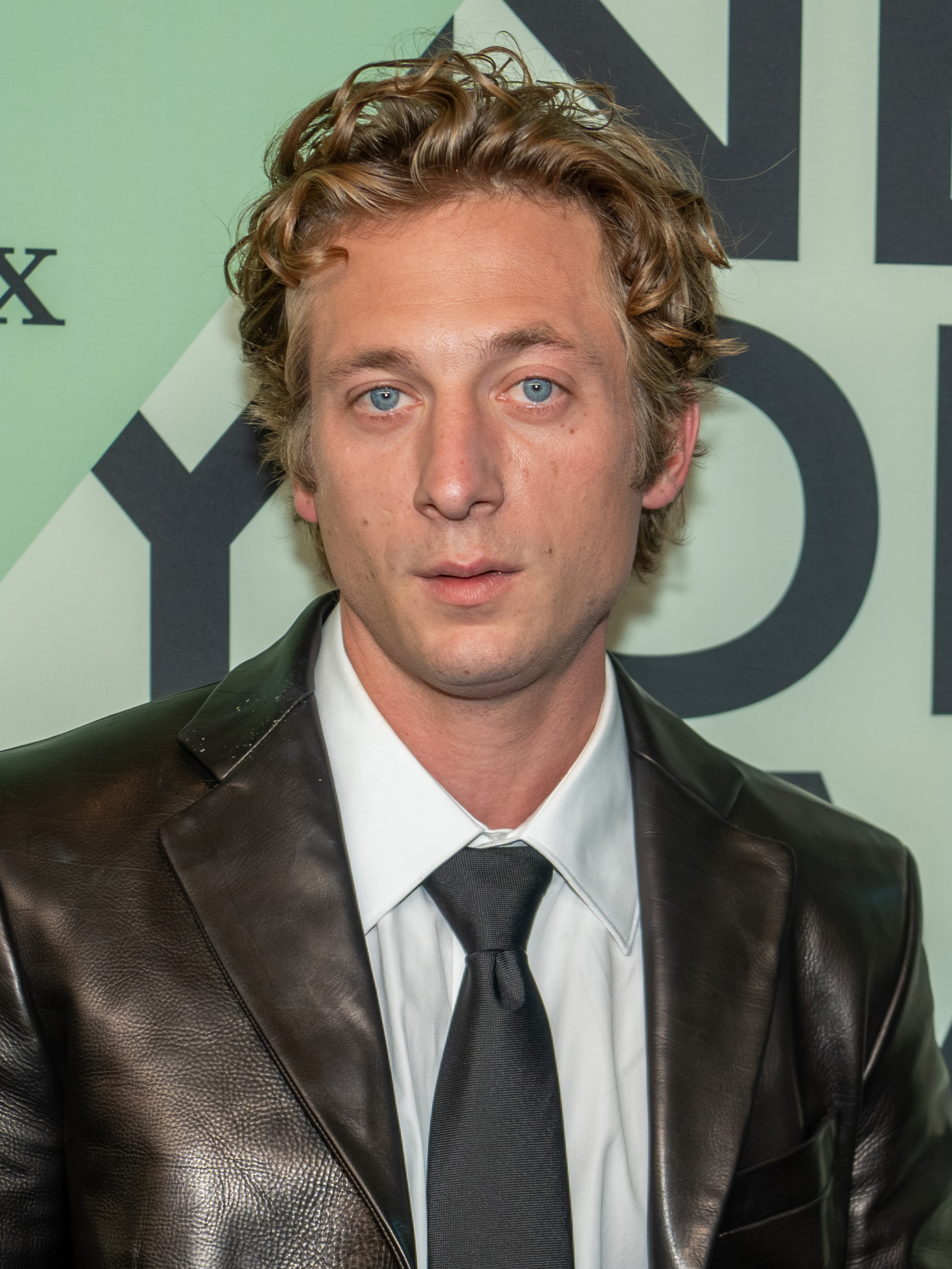
Jeremy Allen White, Best Actor in a Television Series – Musical or Comedy winner

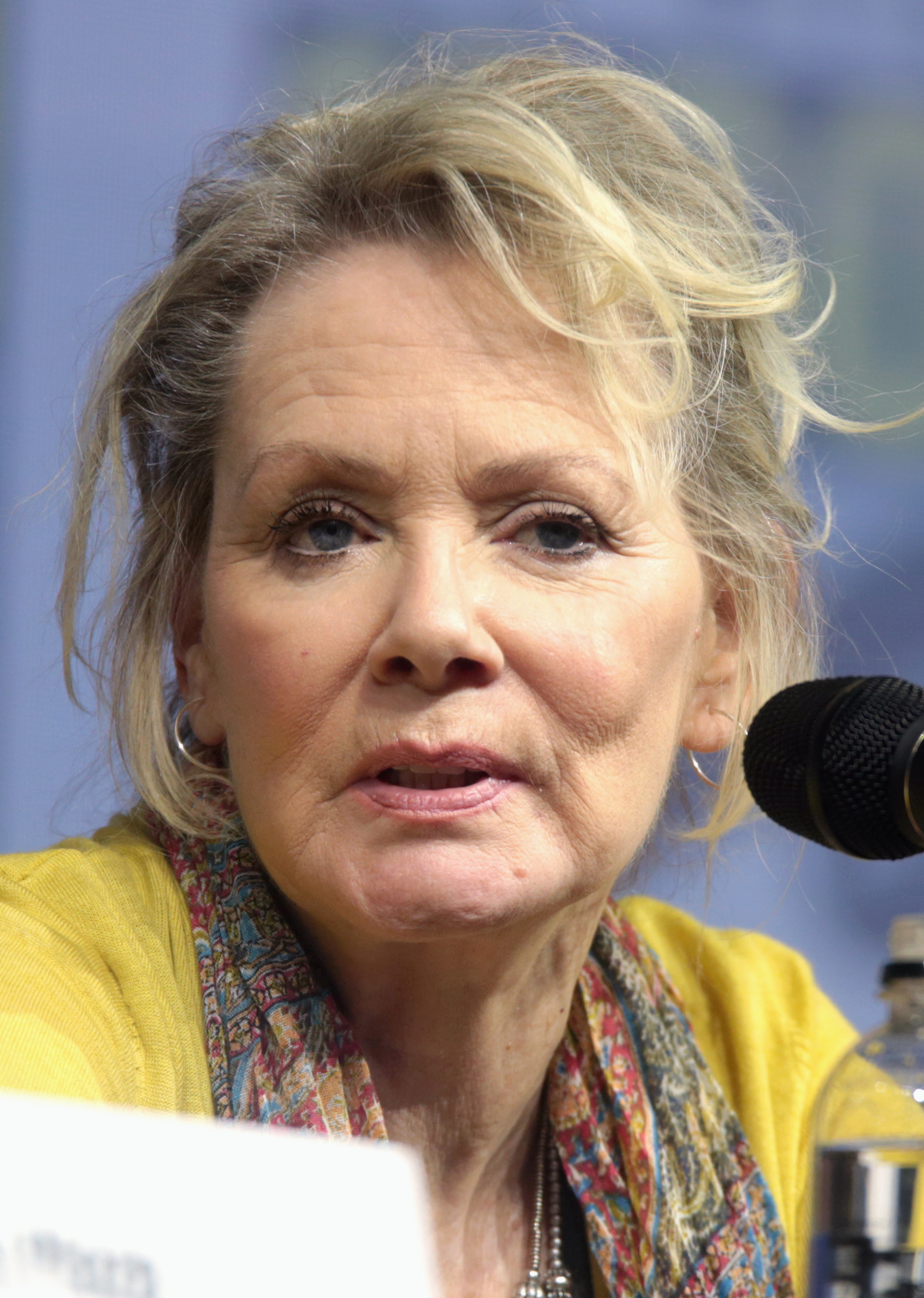
Jean Smart, Best Actress in a Television Series – Musical or Comedy winner

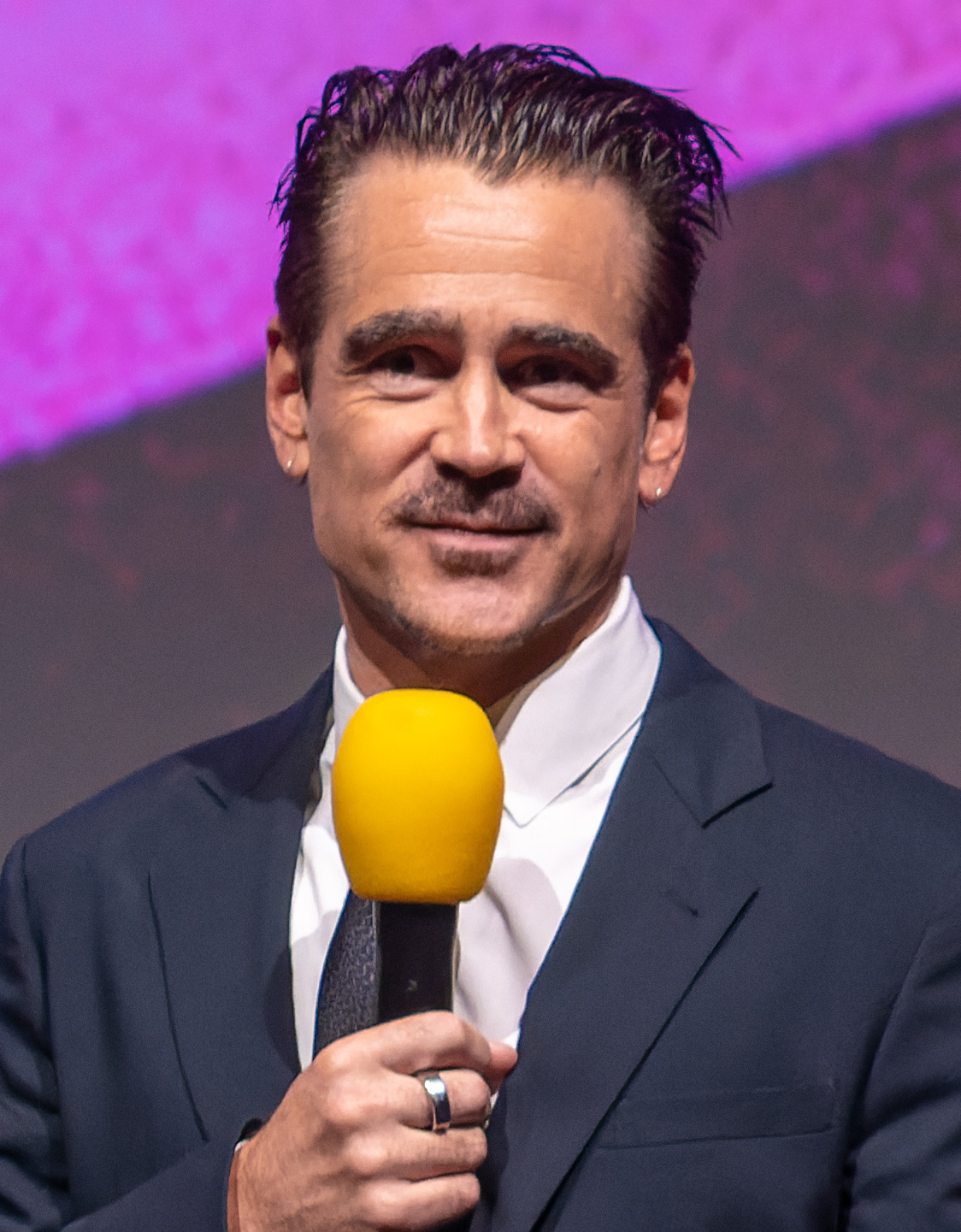
Colin Farrell, Best Actor in a Limited Series, Anthology Series, or Motion Picture Made for Television winner

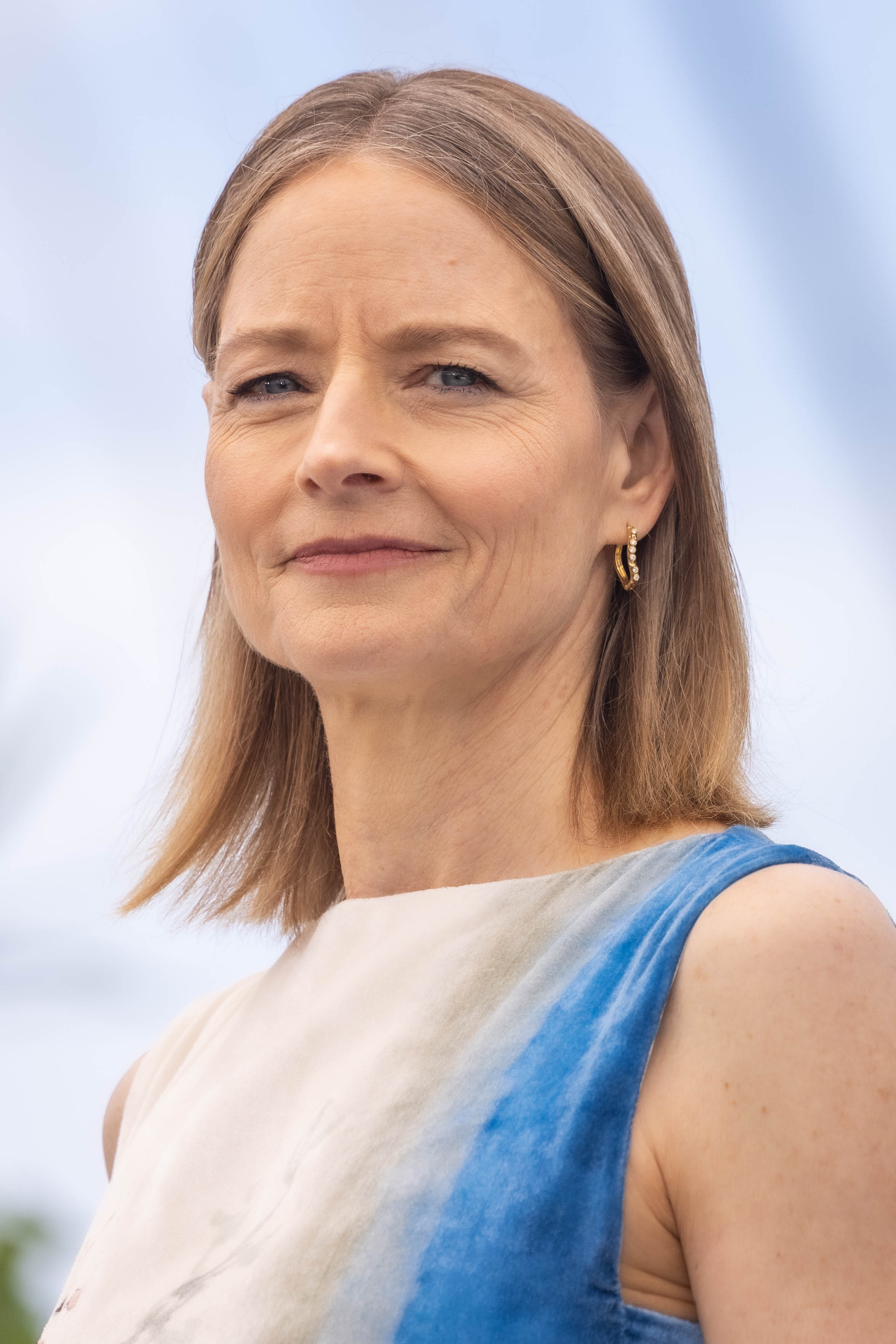
Jodie Foster, Best Actress in a Limited Series, Anthology Series, or Motion Picture Made for Television winner

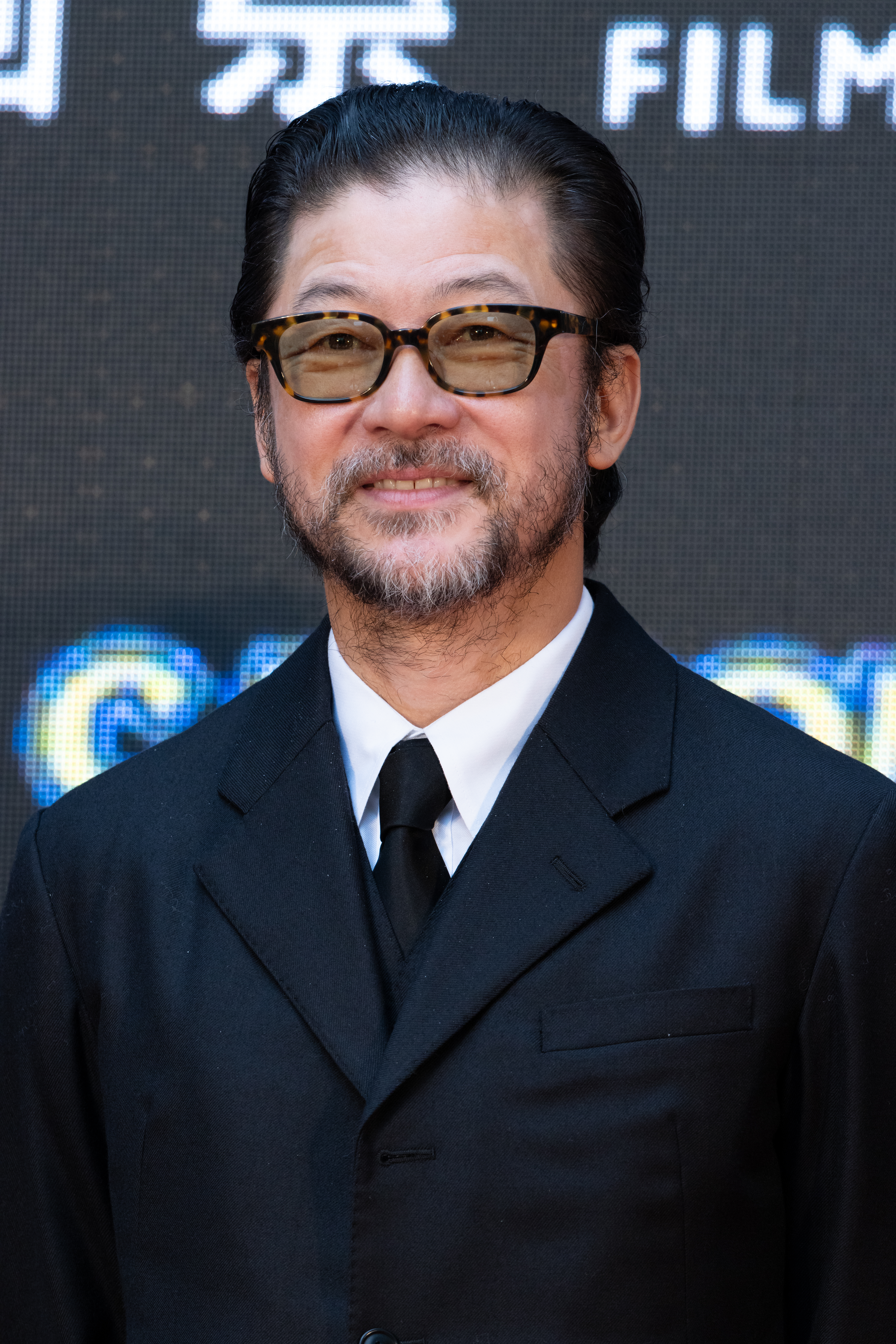
Tadanobu Asano, Best Supporting Actor in a Series, Limited Series, Anthology Series, or Motion Picture Made for Television winner

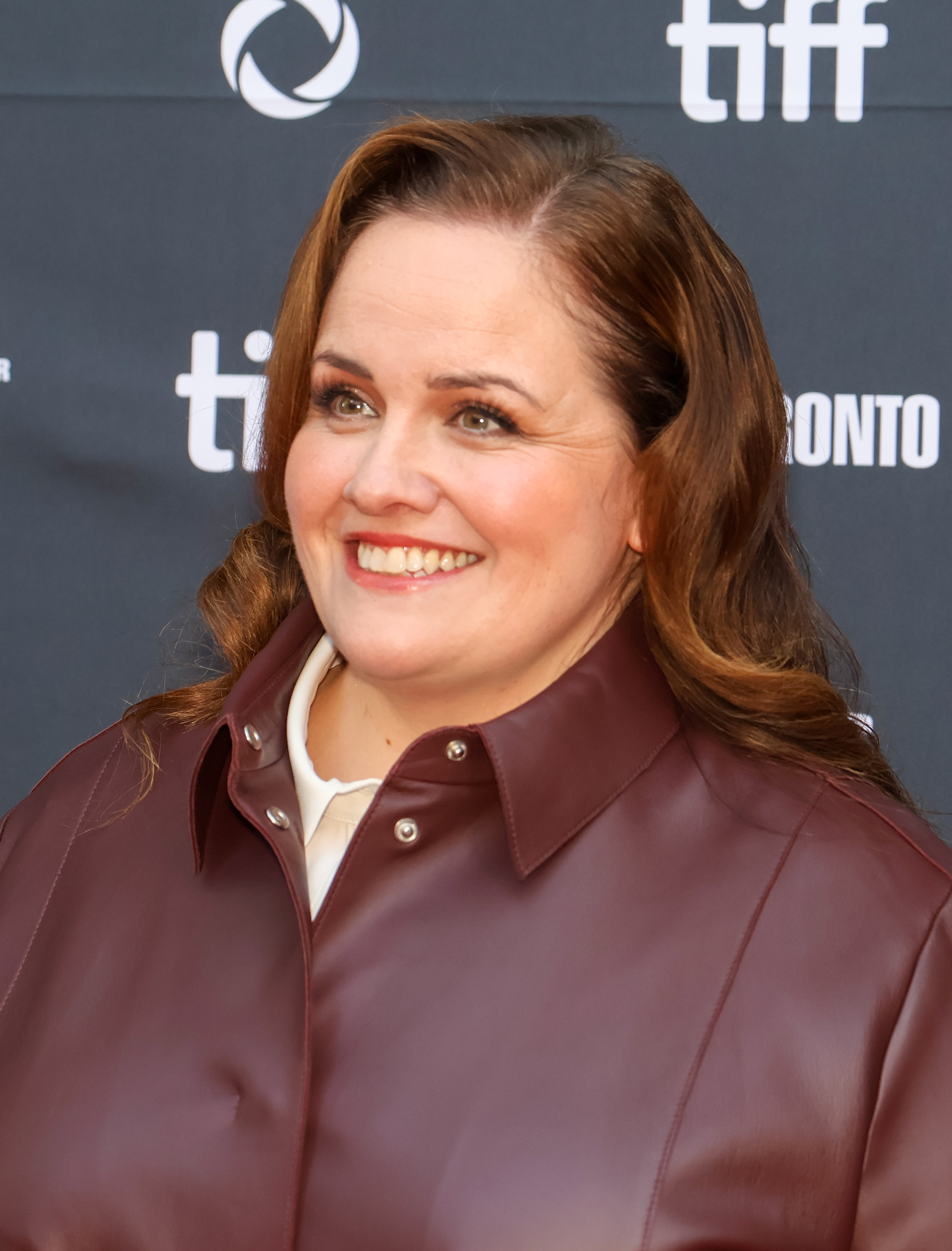
Jessica Gunning, Best Supporting Actress in a Series, Limited Series, Anthology Series, or Motion Picture Made for Television winner

Emilia Pérez star Karla Sofía Gascón was the first trans nominee for a Golden Globe motion picture acting category, for the Best Actress in a Musical or Comedy category. Jacques Audiard, the director and writer of the film, was one of the most nominated individuals, with a total of three nominations: Best Director, Best Screenplay, and co-lyricist of Best Original Song nominee "El Mal". The composers and co-lyricists of the song, Camille and Clément Ducol, tied Audiard for most nominated individuals. Aside from "El Mal", they were also jointly nominated for composing Emilia Pérez's Best Original Score and an additional Best Original Song nominee: "Mi camino".

This year's nominations were tabulated by KPMG, the U.S. audit, tax, and advisory firm, taking over Ernst & Young after fifty plus years. Netflix received a total of 36 nominations between film and television, the most of any distributor.

Emilia Pérez is the first non-English-language film (with some parts of English in the film) to win Best Motion Picture – Musical or Comedy. Flow is the first Latvian film to win Best Animated Feature Film. Fernanda Torres became the first Brazilian actress to win a Golden Globe in an acting category, as well as the first Brazilian, first South American and first Portuguese-speaking actor to win the Golden Globe Award for Best Actress in a Motion Picture – Drama. She acknowledged her mother Fernanda Montenegro's nomination, for Central Station (1998), in the same category at the 56th Golden Globe Awards.

Emilia Pérez and Shōgun were the biggest winners of the night, for film and television, respectively, with four wins each. The Brutalist was the next biggest film recipient, with three wins; for television, Baby Reindeer and Hacks each won two.

=== Film ===
Best Motion Picture – Drama: The Brutalist; A Complete Unknown; Conclave; Dune: Part Two; Nickel Boys; September 5	Best Motion Picture – Musical or Comedy: Emilia Pérez; Anora; Challengers; A Real Pain; The Substance; Wicked
Best Motion Picture – Animated: Flow; Inside Out 2; Memoir of a Snail; Moana 2; Wallace & Gromit: Vengeance Most Fowl; The Wild Robot	Best Motion Picture – Non-English Language: Emilia Pérez (France); All We Imagine as Light (India); The Girl with the Needle (Denmark); I'm Still Here (Brazil); The Seed of the Sacred Fig (Germany); Vermiglio (Italy)
Best Actor in a Motion Picture – Drama: Adrien Brody – The Brutalist as László Tóth; Timothée Chalamet – A Complete Unknown as Bob Dylan; Daniel Craig – Queer as William Lee; Colman Domingo – Sing Sing as John "Divine G" Whitfield; Ralph Fiennes – Conclave as Cardinal Thomas Lawrence; Sebastian Stan – The Apprentice as Donald Trump	Best Actress in a Motion Picture – Drama: Fernanda Torres – I'm Still Here as Eunice Paiva; Pamela Anderson – The Last Showgirl as Shelly; Angelina Jolie – Maria as Maria Callas; Nicole Kidman – Babygirl as Romy Mathis; Tilda Swinton – The Room Next Door as Martha Hunt; Kate Winslet – Lee as Lee Miller
Best Actor in a Motion Picture – Musical or Comedy: Sebastian Stan – A Different Man as Edward Lemuel / Guy Moratz; Jesse Eisenberg – A Real Pain as David Kaplan; Hugh Grant – Heretic as Mr. Reed; Gabriel LaBelle – Saturday Night as Lorne Michaels; Jesse Plemons – Kinds of Kindness as Robert, Daniel, and Andrew (Note: In this triptych fable anthology film, Plemons portrays a separate, distinct character in each segment.); Glen Powell – Hit Man as Gary Johnson	Best Actress in a Motion Picture – Musical or Comedy: Demi Moore – The Substance as Elisabeth Sparkle; Amy Adams – Nightbitch as Mother; Cynthia Erivo – Wicked as Elphaba Thropp; Karla Sofía Gascón – Emilia Pérez as Emilia Pérez / Juan "Manitas" Del Monte; Mikey Madison – Anora as Anora "Ani" Mikheeva; Zendaya – Challengers as Tashi Duncan
Best Supporting Actor in a Motion Picture: Kieran Culkin – A Real Pain as Benji Kaplan; Yura Borisov – Anora as Igor; Edward Norton – A Complete Unknown as Pete Seeger; Guy Pearce – The Brutalist as Harrison Lee Van Buren Sr.; Jeremy Strong – The Apprentice as Roy Cohn; Denzel Washington – Gladiator II as Macrinus	Best Supporting Actress in a Motion Picture: Zoe Saldaña – Emilia Pérez as Rita Mora Castro; Selena Gomez – Emilia Pérez as Jessi Del Monte; Ariana Grande – Wicked as Galinda Upland; Felicity Jones – The Brutalist as Erzsébet Tóth; Margaret Qualley – The Substance as Sue; Isabella Rossellini – Conclave as Sister Agnes
Best Director: Brady Corbet – The Brutalist; Jacques Audiard – Emilia Pérez; Sean Baker – Anora; Edward Berger – Conclave; Coralie Fargeat – The Substance; Payal Kapadia – All We Imagine as Light	Best Screenplay: Peter Straughan – Conclave; Jacques Audiard – Emilia Pérez; Sean Baker – Anora; Brady Corbet and Mona Fastvold – The Brutalist; Jesse Eisenberg – A Real Pain; Coralie Fargeat – The Substance
Best Original Score: Trent Reznor and Atticus Ross – Challengers; Volker Bertelmann – Conclave; Daniel Blumberg – The Brutalist; Kris Bowers – The Wild Robot; Clément Ducol and Camille – Emilia Pérez; Hans Zimmer – Dune: Part Two	Cinematic and Box Office Achievement: Wicked; Alien: Romulus; Beetlejuice Beetlejuice; Deadpool & Wolverine; Gladiator II; Inside Out 2; Twisters; The Wild Robot
Best Original Song: "El Mal" (Clément Ducol, Camille, and Jacques Audiard) – Emilia Pérez; "Beautiful That Way" (Andrew Wyatt, Miley Cyrus, and Lykke Li) – The Last Showgirl; "Compress / Repress" (Trent Reznor, Atticus Ross, and Luca Guadagnino) – Challengers; "Forbidden Road" (Robbie Williams, Freddy Wexler, and Sacha Skarbek) – Better Man; "Kiss the Sky" (Delacey, Jordan K. Johnson, Stefan Johnson, Maren Morris, Michael Pollack, and Ali Tamposi) – The Wild Robot; "Mi camino" (Clément Ducol and Camille) – Emilia Pérez

==== Honorary award recipient ====
- Cecil B. DeMille Award: Viola Davis

==== Films with multiple nominations ====
The following films received multiple nominations:

Nominations	Films	Category	Distributor
10	Emilia Pérez	M/C	Netflix
7	The Brutalist	Drama	A24
6	Conclave	Drama	Focus Features
5	Anora	M/C	Neon
5	The Substance	M/C	MUBI
4	Challengers	M/C	Amazon MGM Studios
4	A Real Pain	M/C	Searchlight Pictures
4	Wicked	M/C	Universal Pictures
4	The Wild Robot	Animated	Universal Pictures
3	A Complete Unknown	Drama	Searchlight Pictures
2	All We Imagine as Light	Drama	Janus Films
2	The Apprentice	Drama	Briarcliff Entertainment
2	Dune: Part Two	Drama	Warner Bros. Pictures
2	Gladiator II	Drama	Paramount Pictures
2	I'm Still Here	Drama	Sony Pictures Classics
2	Inside Out 2	Animated	Walt Disney Studios Motion Pictures
2	The Last Showgirl	Drama	Roadside Attractions

==== Films with multiple wins ====
The following films received multiple wins:

Wins	Films	Category	Distributor
4	Emilia Pérez	M/C	Netflix
3	The Brutalist	Drama	A24

=== Television ===
Best Television Series – Drama: Shōgun (FX / Hulu); The Day of the Jackal (Peacock / Sky Atlantic); The Diplomat (Netflix); Mr. & Mrs. Smith (Prime Video); Slow Horses (Apple TV+); Squid Game (Netflix)	Best Television Series – Musical or Comedy: Hacks (Max); Abbott Elementary (ABC); The Bear (FX / Hulu); The Gentlemen (Netflix); Nobody Wants This (Netflix); Only Murders in the Building (Hulu)
Best Limited Series, Anthology Series, or Motion Picture Made for Television: Baby Reindeer (Netflix); Disclaimer (Apple TV+); Monsters: The Lyle and Erik Menendez Story (Netflix); The Penguin (HBO / Max); Ripley (Netflix); True Detective: Night Country (HBO / Max)	Best Performance in Stand-Up Comedy on Television: Ali Wong – Ali Wong: Single Lady (Netflix); Jamie Foxx – Jamie Foxx: What Had Happened Was... (Netflix); Nikki Glaser – Nikki Glaser: Someday You'll Die (HBO / Max); Seth Meyers – Seth Meyers: Dad Man Walking (HBO / Max); Adam Sandler – Adam Sandler: Love You (Netflix); Ramy Youssef – Ramy Youssef: More Feelings (HBO / Max)
Best Actor in a Television Series – Drama: Hiroyuki Sanada – Shōgun (FX / Hulu) as Lord Yoshii Toranaga; Donald Glover – Mr. & Mrs. Smith (Prime Video) as John Smith / Michael; Jake Gyllenhaal – Presumed Innocent (Apple TV+) as Rusty Sabich; Gary Oldman – Slow Horses (Apple TV+) as Jackson Lamb; Eddie Redmayne – The Day of the Jackal (Peacock / Sky Atlantic) as The Jackal; Billy Bob Thornton – Landman (Paramount+) as Tommy Norris	Best Actress in a Television Series – Drama: Anna Sawai – Shōgun (FX / Hulu) as Toda Mariko; Kathy Bates – Matlock (CBS) as Madeline "Matty" Matlock / Madeline Kingston; Emma D'Arcy – House of the Dragon (HBO / Max) as Queen Rhaenyra Targaryen; Maya Erskine – Mr. & Mrs. Smith (Prime Video) as Jane Smith / Alana; Keira Knightley – Black Doves (Netflix) as Helen Webb; Keri Russell – The Diplomat (Netflix) as Katherine "Kate" Wyler
Best Actor in a Television Series – Musical or Comedy: Jeremy Allen White – The Bear (FX / Hulu) as Carmen "Carmy" Berzatto; Adam Brody – Nobody Wants This (Netflix) as Noah Roklov; Ted Danson – A Man on the Inside (Netflix) as Charles; Steve Martin – Only Murders in the Building (Hulu) as Charles-Haden Savage; Jason Segel – Shrinking (Apple TV+) as Jimmy Laird; Martin Short – Only Murders in the Building (Hulu) as Oliver Putnam	Best Actress in a Television Series – Musical or Comedy: Jean Smart – Hacks (Max) as Deborah Vance; Kristen Bell – Nobody Wants This (Netflix) as Joanne; Quinta Brunson – Abbott Elementary (ABC) as Janine Teagues; Ayo Edebiri – The Bear (FX / Hulu) as Sydney Adamu; Selena Gomez – Only Murders in the Building (Hulu) as Mabel Mora; Kathryn Hahn – Agatha All Along (Disney+) as Agatha Harkness
Best Actor in a Limited Series, Anthology Series, or Motion Picture Made for Television: Colin Farrell – The Penguin (HBO / Max) as Oswald "Oz" Cobb / The Penguin; Richard Gadd – Baby Reindeer (Netflix) as Donny Dunn; Kevin Kline – Disclaimer (Apple TV+) as Stephen Brigstocke; Cooper Koch – Monsters: The Lyle and Erik Menendez Story (Netflix) as Erik Menendez; Ewan McGregor – A Gentleman in Moscow (Paramount+) as Count Alexander Ilyich Rostov; Andrew Scott – Ripley (Netflix) as Tom Ripley	Best Actress in a Limited Series, Anthology Series, or Motion Picture Made for Television: Jodie Foster – True Detective: Night Country (HBO / Max) as Chief Liz Danvers; Cate Blanchett – Disclaimer (Apple TV+) as Catherine Ravenscroft; Cristin Milioti – The Penguin (HBO / Max) as Sofia Falcone; Sofía Vergara – Griselda (Netflix) as Griselda Blanco; Naomi Watts – Feud: Capote vs. The Swans (FX / Hulu) as Babe Paley; Kate Winslet – The Regime (HBO / Max) as Chancellor Elena Vernham
Best Supporting Actor on Television: Tadanobu Asano – Shōgun (FX / Hulu) as Kashigi Yabushige; Javier Bardem – Monsters: The Lyle and Erik Menendez Story (Netflix) as José Menendez; Harrison Ford – Shrinking (Apple TV+) as Dr. Paul Rhoades; Jack Lowden – Slow Horses (Apple TV+) as River Cartwright; Diego Luna – La Máquina (Disney+) as Andy Pérez; Ebon Moss-Bachrach – The Bear (FX / Hulu) as Richard "Richie" Jerimovich	Best Supporting Actress on Television: Jessica Gunning – Baby Reindeer (Netflix) as Martha Scott; Liza Colón-Zayas – The Bear (FX / Hulu) as Tina Marrero; Hannah Einbinder – Hacks (Max) as Ava Daniels; Dakota Fanning – Ripley (Netflix) as Marge Sherwood; Allison Janney – The Diplomat (Netflix) as Vice President Grace Penn; Kali Reis – True Detective: Night Country (HBO / Max) as Trooper Evangeline Navarro

==== Honorary award recipient ====
- Carol Burnett Award: Ted Danson

==== Series with multiple nominations ====
The following television series received multiple nominations:

Nominations	Series	Category	Distributor(s)
5	The Bear	M/C	FX / Hulu
4	Only Murders in the Building	M/C	Hulu
4	Shōgun	Drama	FX / Hulu
3	Baby Reindeer	LAMP	Netflix
3	The Diplomat	Drama	Netflix
3	Disclaimer	LAMP	Apple TV+
3	Hacks	M/C	Max
3	Monsters: The Lyle and Erik Menendez Story	LAMP	Netflix
3	Mr. & Mrs. Smith	Drama	Prime Video
3	Nobody Wants This	M/C	Netflix
3	The Penguin	LAMP	HBO / Max
3	Ripley	LAMP	Netflix
3	Slow Horses	Drama	Apple TV+
3	True Detective: Night Country	LAMP	HBO / Max
2	Abbott Elementary	M/C	ABC
2	The Day of the Jackal	Drama	Peacock / Sky Atlantic
2	Shrinking	M/C	Apple TV+

==== Series with multiple wins ====
The following series received multiple wins:

Wins	Series	Category	Distributor(s)
4	Shōgun	Drama	FX / Hulu
2	Baby Reindeer	LAMP	Netflix
2	Hacks	M/C	Max

== Presenters ==
The following performers presented awards at the ceremony. Furthermore, Aubrey Plaza and Rob McElhenney were originally announced as presenters on January 2, 2025, but were not included in the final running order on the day of the ceremony.

Name(s)	Role
Auliʻi Cravalho; Dwayne Johnson	Presented the award for Best Supporting Actress – Motion Picture
Kate Hudson; Mindy Kaling	Presented the award for Best Actress in a Television Series – Musical or Comedy
Ariana DeBose; Ke Huy Quan	Presented the award for Best Supporting Actor – Motion Picture
Margaret Qualley; Demi Moore	Presented the award for Best Actor in a Television Series – Drama
Kathy Bates; Anthony Ramos	Presented the awards for Best Supporting Actress – Limited Series, Anthology Series, or Motion Picture Made for Television and Best Supporting Actor – Limited Series, Anthology Series, or Motion Picture Made for Television
Jennifer Coolidge	Presented the award for Best Actor in a Television Series – Musical or Comedy
Morris Chestnut; Kaley Cuoco	Presented the award for Best Screenplay
Nate Bargatze	Presented the award for Best Performance in Stand-Up Comedy on Television
Sharon Stone	Presented the award for Best Motion Picture – Non-English Language
Anya Taylor-Joy; Miles Teller	Presented the award for Best Actor – Limited Series, Anthology Series, or Motion Picture Made for Television
Catherine O'Hara; Seth Rogen	Presented the award for Best Actress – Limited Series, Anthology Series, or Motion Picture Made for Television
Kerry Washington; Andrew Garfield	Presented the awards for Best Actress in a Motion Picture – Musical or Comedy and Best Actor in a Motion Picture – Musical or Comedy
Anthony Mackie; Harrison Ford	Presented the award for Best Motion Picture – Animated
Michael Keaton	Presented the award for Best Director
Elton John; Brandi Carlile	Presented the award for Best Original Score
Michelle Yeoh; Jeff Goldblum	Presented the award for Best Original Song
Vin Diesel	Presented the award for Cinematic and Box Office Achievement
Rachel Brosnahan; Sarah Paulson	Presented the award for Best Limited Series, Anthology Series, or Motion Picture Made for Television
Awkwafina; Melissa McCarthy	Presented the award for Best Television Series – Musical or Comedy
Colman Domingo; Salma Hayek Pinault	Presented the award for Best Actress – Television Series Drama
Zoë Kravitz; Colin Farrell	Presented the award for Best Television Series – Drama
Viola Davis	Presented the award for Best Actress in a Motion Picture – Drama
Édgar Ramírez; Gal Gadot	Presented the award for Best Actor in a Motion Picture – Drama
Glenn Close	Presented the award for Best Motion Picture – Drama
Nicolas Cage	Presented the award for Best Motion Picture – Musical or Comedy

== See also ==
- 52nd Annie Awards
- 97th Academy Awards
- 78th British Academy Film Awards
- 30th Critics' Choice Awards
- 45th Golden Raspberry Awards
- 40th Independent Spirit Awards
- 29th Satellite Awards
- 52nd Saturn Awards
- 31st Screen Actors Guild Awards
