= 6th Society of Composers & Lyricists Awards =

2024 Awards Ceremony

- Date: February 12, 2025
- Location: Los Angeles, California
- Website: thescl.com

The 6th Society of Composers & Lyricists Awards recognized the best in music in films, television productions and interactive media of 2024. The ceremony was hosted by Colin Hay and took place on February 12, 2025, at the Skirball Cultural Center, Los Angeles, California.

The nominees were announced on December 18, 2024. French musical drama film Emilia Pérez led the nominations with three, followed by the television series Shōgun, The Lord of the Rings: The Rings of Power, Masters of the Air and Palm Royale, with two nominations each.

British composer Harry Gregson-Williams and English filmmaker Ridley Scott received the Spirit of Collaboration Award, while American composer Jeff Beal was presented with the Jury Award.

== Winners and nominees ==
Winners are listed first and in bold.

=== Score ===
| Outstanding Original Score for a Studio Film | Outstanding Original Score for an Independent Film |
|---|---|
| **The Wild Robot – Kris Bowers**; Emilia Pérez – Clément Ducol, Camille; Dune: Part Two – Hans Zimmer; Gladiator II – Harry Gregson-Williams; Wicked – John Powell, Stephen Schwartz; Conclave – Volker Bertelmann | **The Brutalist – Daniel Blumberg**; Heretic – Chris Bacon; Meet Me Next Christmas – Dara Taylor; Here After – Fabrizio Mancinelli; Winner – Heather McIntosh; The Book of Jobs – Stephanie Economou |
| Outstanding Original Score for a Television Production | Outstanding Original Title Sequence for a Television Production |
| **Shōgun – Atticus Ross, Leopold Ross, Nick Chuba**; The Lord of the Rings: The Rings of Power – Bear McCreary; Masters of the Air – Blake Neely; Mr. & Mrs. Smith – David Fleming; Disclaimer – Finneas O'Connell; Palm Royale – Jeff Toyne | **Palm Royale – Jeff Toyne**; Shōgun – Atticus Ross, Leopold Ross, Nick Chuba; Masters of the Air – Blake Neely; Griselda – Carlos Rafael Rivera; Manhunt – Danielle Ponder; Dream Productions – Nami Melumad |
| Outstanding Original Score for Interactive Media | David Raksin Award for Emerging Talent |
| **Wizardry: Proving Grounds of the Mad Overlord – Winifred Phillips**; Indiana Jones and the Great Circle – Gordy Haab; Tales of Kenzera: Zau – Nainita Desai; Star Wars Outlaws – Wilbert Roget II | **Inside Out 2 – Andrea Datzman**; Broken Bird – Emily Rice; Motorcycle Mary – Katya Richardson; Dead Whisper – Nikhil Koparkar; Nosferatu – Robin Carolan; Invisible Nation – Wei-San Hsu |

=== Song ===
| Outstanding Original Song for a Dramatic or Documentary Visual Media Production | Outstanding Original Song for a Comedy or Musical Visual Media Production |
|---|---|
| **"The Journey" from The Six Triple Eight – Diane Warren**; "Beautiful That Way" from The Last Showgirl – Andrew Wyatt, Lykke Li, Miley Cyrus; "Old Tom Bombadil" from The Lord of the Rings: The Rings of Power – Bear McCreary; "Let's Put the Christ Back in Christmas" from The Boys – Christopher Lennertz; "Never Too Late" from Elton John: Never Too Late – Elton John, Brandi Carlile, Bernie Taupin, Andrew Watt; "Winter Coat" from Blitz – Nicholas Britell, Steve McQueen, Taura Stinson | **"Compress/Repress" from Challengers – Trent Reznor, Atticus Ross, Luca Guadagnino**; "Beyond" from Moana 2 – Abigail Barlow, Emily Bear; "Mi Camino" from Emilia Pérez – Clément Ducol, Camille; "El Mal" from Emilia Pérez – Clément Ducol, Camille, Jacques Audiard; "Out of Oklahoma" from Twisters – Lainey Wilson, Luke Dick, Shane McAnally; "Forbidden Road" from Better Man – Robbie Williams, Freddy Wexler, Sacha Skarbek |
