= Karla Sofía Gascón =

Spanish actress (born 1972)

- Gascón in 2025
- Born: 31 March 1972 (age 54); Alcobendas, Spain
- Other name: Carlos Gascón
- Occupation: Actress
- Years active: 1995–present
- Spouse: Marisa Gutiérrez
- Children: 1

Karla Sofía Gascón (formerly Carlos Gascón; born 31 March 1972) is a Spanish actress. She has developed part of her career in North America, featuring in the comedy film The Noble Family (2013) and the narcoseries El Señor de los Cielos (beginning 2013).

Gascón has gained wide attention for portraying the title character in the musical crime film Emilia Pérez (2024), written and directed by Jacques Audiard. For the role, she jointly won the Cannes Film Festival Award for Best Actress with her three female co-stars, becoming the first openly transgender actress to win the prize. She also won the European Film Award for Best Actress. She was the first openly transgender actress to be nominated for the Academy Award for Best Actress.

== Early life and education ==
Gascón was born Juan Carlos Gascón on 31 March 1972 in Alcobendas, Spain. In her childhood, she playacted with her brother, and, at 16, she decided to pursue an acting career. She earned an acting degree from the ECAM. She worked in London on a BBC series for Spanish-language learning and in Milan voicing puppets for children's shows.

== Career ==
=== 2002–2009: Early roles in Spain and move to Mexico ===
Before 2014, Gascón portrayed male characters and was credited under her birth name Juan Carlos Gascón. She appeared in Spanish daily soap opera El súper portraying a flight attendant, as well as in such other shows as Calle nueva and El pasado es mañana. Early roles also included film appearances in Se buscan fulmontis (1999), Me da igual (2000), Box 507 (2002), and Say I Do (2004).

Convinced by Mexican filmmaker Julián Pastor, Gascón moved to Mexico in 2009 to continue her acting career, taking on a number of telenovela roles, starting with the gypsy Branko in Corazón salvaje. She made a one-time return to the Spanish film industry to star alongside Tony Isbert in El cura y el veneno. In the Mexican box-office hit The Noble Family (2013), she played the supporting role of Peter Pintado, the gold-digging boyfriend of Karla Souza's character Bárbara Noble, who poses as a Spaniard but is actually from Puebla. In 2014, she appeared in El Señor de los Cielos as the "ruthless" Spaniard Iñaki Izarrieta, an associate of Aurelio Casillas.

=== 2018–2024: Transition, Emilia Pérez and fallout ===
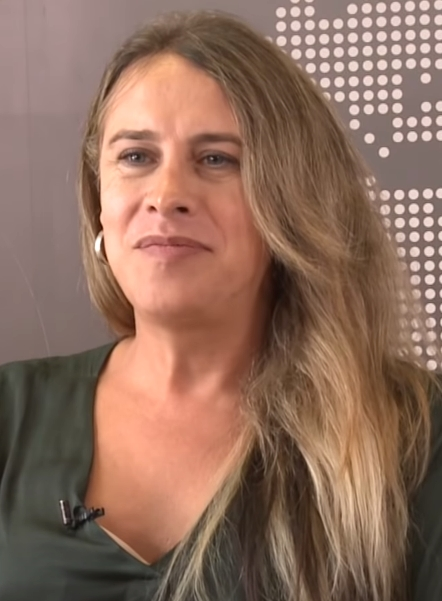
Gascón in 2018

In 2018, having completed most of her gender transition, Gascón published a magical realist memoir, Karsia, Una historia extraordinaria (Karsia: an Extraordinary Story) under the name Carlos Gascón. It doubled as a public announcement of her new identity as Karla Sofía Gascón.

She portrayed Lourdes Buendía in the teen drama series Rebelde (2022). In 2024, she starred in Jacques Audiard's musical crime film Emilia Pérez, which premiered at the 2024 Cannes Film Festival. In it, she portrays a powerful cartel leader who is married with children. The character fakes her death, medically transitions from male to female, and assumes a new life as Emilia Pérez.

Gascón won the festival's Best Actress prize, shared jointly with her three female costars Selena Gomez, Adriana Paz, and Zoe Saldaña. Gascón is the first openly trans actor to win a major prize at Cannes. Later in the year, she became a Chevalière of the French Ordre des Arts et des Lettres. In December 2024, she was reported to have signed on to star as Aunt Encarna in Las malas, an adaptation of Camila Sosa Villada's Bad Girls to be directed by Armando Bó.

In January 2025, after her Academy Award for Best Actress nomination for Emilia Pérez, a series of tweets Gascón made between 2019 and 2021 resurfaced. They were identified as containing bigoted speech against several communities, including one calling Islam a "hotbed of infection for humanity", ones with Catalanophobic content, and one wondering whether the Oscars had become an "Afro-Korean festival", a "Black Lives Matter demonstration", or International Women's Day. Gascón deleted the tweets and apologized, then deactivated her X account the next day. In February 2025 she was dropped from promotional activities for Emilia Pérez, including award shows (Premios Goya), and her book's publication was canceled. Gascón described herself as a victim of cancel culture.

In 2025, she appeared in the Italian comedy film Men and Other Inconveniences.

She made her return to a film set after the tempestuous Emilia Pérez awards season with the shooting of Western adventure film Trinidad, set to portray a villainous role, which she described as "Darth Vader, but female".

== Personal life ==
Gascón considers herself "Mexican by adoption", having lived and worked in Mexico for many years. She is a Nichiren Buddhist. As of 2025, she lives in Alcobendas, Spain, her hometown.

Gascón is married to Marisa Gutiérrez, whom she met at age 19 at a nightclub in her hometown. They have a daughter, born in 2011. Gascón was assigned male at birth but transitioned in 2018 after dealing with gender dysphoria and now identifies as a woman.

== Selected filmography ==
Film
Year	Title	Role	Notes	Ref.
1999	Se buscan fulmontis	Gigolo del club		
2002	La caja 507	Gafitas		
2004	Di que sí	Álex		
2010	Cambio de sentido	Cantante		
2013	Nosotros, los Nobles	Peter Pintado		
2013	El cura y el veneno	Felipe		
2024	Emilia Pérez	Emilia Pérez / Juan "Manitas" del Monte		
2025	Uomini e altri inconvenienti			
TBD	Trinidad †	Viuda Bronson	Filming	

Television
Year	Title	Role	Notes
2009–2010	Corazón salvaje		
2010–2011	Llena de amor	Jorge Jauma	
2014	El Señor de los Cielos	Iñaki Izarrieta	
2014–2015	Hasta el fin del mundo		
2022	Rebelde	Lourdes	

== Accolades ==
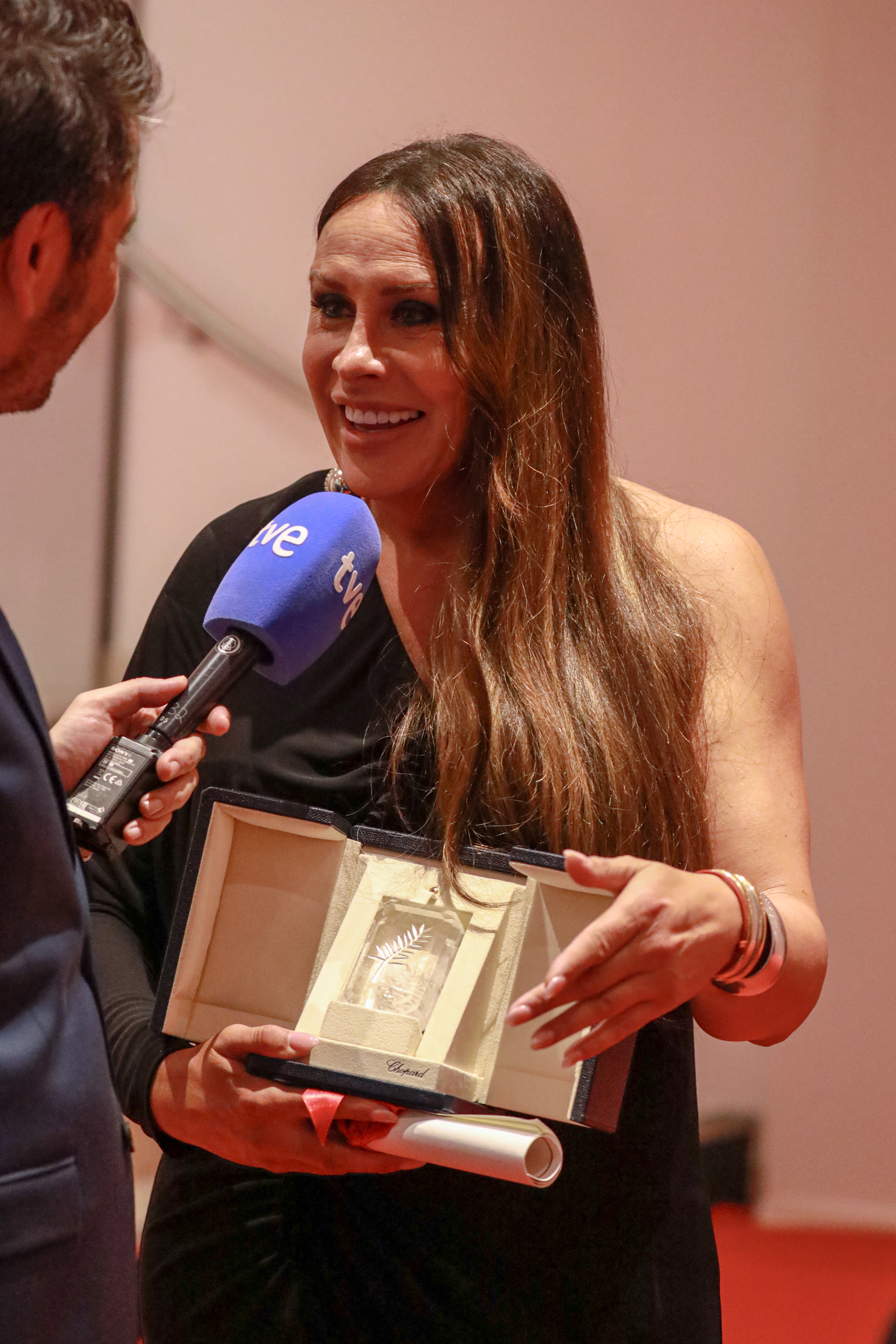
Gascón holding a prize at the 2024 Cannes Film Festival

Year	Award	Category	Work	Result	Ref.
2024	Astra Film Awards	Best Actress	Emilia Pérez	Nominated	
2024	Astra Film Awards	Game Changer Award	Emilia Pérez	Won	
2024	Astra Creative Arts Awards	Best Original Song	"El mal" (from Emilia Pérez)	Nominated	
2024	Cannes Film Festival	Best Actress	Emilia Pérez	Won	
2024	Capri Hollywood International Film Festival	Best Ensemble Cast	Emilia Pérez	Won	
2024	European Film Awards	Best Actress	Emilia Pérez	Won	
2024	Ischia Global Film & Music Festival	Ischia Global Breakout Actress of the Year Award	Emilia Pérez	Won	
2024	Mill Valley Film Festival	Outstanding Ensemble Performance	Emilia Pérez	Won	
2024	San Francisco Bay Area Film Critics Circle	Best Actress	Emilia Pérez	Nominated	
2024	SCAD Savannah Film Festival	Distinguished Performance Award	Emilia Pérez	Won	
2024	Toronto Film Critics Association	Outstanding Lead Performance	Emilia Pérez	Runner-up	
2024	Washington D.C. Area Film Critics Association Awards	Best Actress	Emilia Pérez	Nominated	
2024	Chicago Film Critics Association	Most Promising Performer	Emilia Pérez	Nominated	
2025	AACTA International Awards	Best Actress	Emilia Pérez	Nominated	
2025	British Academy Film Awards	Best Actress in a Leading Role	Emilia Pérez	Nominated	
2025	Critics' Choice Movie Awards	Best Actress	Emilia Pérez	Nominated	
2025	Critics' Choice Movie Awards	Best Acting Ensemble	Emilia Pérez	Nominated	
2025	Golden Globe Awards	Best Actress in a Motion Picture – Musical or Comedy	Emilia Pérez	Nominated	
2025	Lumière Awards	Best Actress	Emilia Pérez	Won	
2025	Palm Springs International Film Festival	Vanguard Award	Emilia Pérez	Awarded	
2025	Santa Barbara International Film Festival	Virtuoso Award	Emilia Pérez	Awarded	
2025	Satellite Awards	Best Actress – Comedy or Musical	Emilia Pérez	Nominated	
2025	Screen Actors Guild Awards	Outstanding Performance by a Female Actor in a Leading Role	Emilia Pérez	Nominated	
2025	Academy Awards	Best Actress	Emilia Pérez	Nominated	
2025	33rd Actors and Actresses Union Awards	Best Actress in an International Production	Emilia Pérez	Won	
