= Society of Composers & Lyricists =

American professional association (1983–)

The Society of Composers & Lyricists is an organization founded in 1983 to represent composers and lyricists working in visual media, such as television and film. It sought union status in 1984 after the dissolution of the Composers and Lyricists Guild of America, but the National Labor Relations Board denied the bid on the basis that songwriters were independent contractors. Another attempt to become a union in the 1990s was also unsuccessful. Members of the organization also include orchestrators, arrangers, music supervisors, music agents, music attorneys, music editors, copyists, and audio engineers.

== Chapters ==
The Society of Composers & Lyricists operates three chapters outside of Los Angeles.

Location	Year Founded	Chairs	Ref.
New York, NY	2011	Greg Pliska	
Nashville, TN	2022	Jay Weigel	
Chicago, IL	2025	Tony Scott-Green	

== Awards ==
Since 2020, the Society of Composers & Lyricists has presented annual awards for music in film, television, and other media.

=== Ceremonies ===
#	Date	Location	Host	Ref.
1st	January 7, 2020	Skirball Cultural Center	—N/a	
2nd	March 2, 2021	Virtual	Michael Giacchino	
3rd	March 8, 2022 (Note: Rescheduled from February 1 due to the COVID-19 pandemic.)	Skirball Cultural Center	Aloe Blacc	
4th	February 15, 2023	Skirball Cultural Center	Darren Criss	
5th	February 13, 2024	Skirball Cultural Center	Siedah Garrett	
6th	February 12, 2025	Skirball Cultural Center	Colin Hay	
7th	February 6, 2026	Skirball Cultural Center	Michael & Kevin Bacon	

=== Categories ===
Since 2024, the organization presents awards in eight competitive categories:

==== Outstanding Original Score for a Studio Film ====
#	Year	Film	Music by	Ref.
1st	2020	Joker	Hildur Guðnadóttir	
2nd	2021	Soul	Trent Reznor, Atticus Ross, and Jon Batiste	
3rd	2022	Encanto	Germaine Franco	
4th	2023	Nope	Michael Abels	
5th	2024	Oppenheimer	Ludwig Göransson	
6th	2025	The Wild Robot	Kris Bowers	
7th	2026	Sinners	Ludwig Göransson	

==== Outstanding Original Score for an Independent Film ====
#	Year	Film	Music by	Ref.
1st	2020	Toni Morrison: The Pieces I Am	Kathryn Bostic	
2nd	2021	Blizzard of Souls	Lolita Ritmanis	
3rd	2022	The Green Knight	Daniel Hart	
4th	2023	Everything Everywhere All At Once	Son Lux	
5th	2024	Still: A Michael J. Fox Movie	John Powell	
6th	2025	The Brutalist	Daniel Blumberg	
7th	2026	Train Dreams	Bryce Dessner	

==== Outstanding Original Score for a Television Production ====
#	Year	Production	Music by	Ref.
1st	2020	Chernobyl	Hildur Guðnadóttir	
2nd	2021	The Queen's Gambit	Carlos Rafael Rivera	
3rd	2022	The White Lotus	Cristobal Tapia de Veer	
4th	2023	The White Lotus	Cristobal Tapia de Veer	
5th	2024	Succession	Nicholas Britell	
6th	2025	Shōgun	Atticus Ross, Leopold Ross, Nick Chuba	
7th	2026	Severance	Theodore Shapiro	

==== Outstanding Original Title Sequence for a Television Production ====
#	Year	Production	Music by	Ref.
5th	2024	Lessons in Chemistry	Carlos Rafael Rivera	
6th	2025	Palm Royale	Jeff Toyne	
7th	2026	The White Lotus	Cristobal Tapia de Veer	

==== Outstanding Original Song for a Dramatic or Documentary Visual Media Production ====
Prior to 2022, a single award was given for Original Song in a Visual Media Production, irrespective of genre.

#	Year	Song	Production	Song by	Ref.
1st	2020	"Stand Up"	Harriet	Joshuah Brian Campbell and Cynthia Erivo	
3rd	2022	"No Time to Die"	No Time to Die	Billie Eilish O'Connell and Finneas O'Connell	
4th	2023	"Applause"	Tell It Like a Woman	Diane Warren	
5th	2024	"Can't Catch Me Now"	The Hunger Games: The Ballad of Songbirds & Snakes	Olivia Rodrigo and Dan Nigro	
6th	2025	"The Journey"	The Six Triple Eight	Diane Warren	
7th	2026	"I Lied to You"	Sinners	Raphael Saadiq and Ludwig Göransson	

==== Outstanding Original Song for a Comedy or Musical Visual Media Production ====
Prior to 2022, a single award was given for Original Song in a Visual Media Production, irrespective of genre.

#	Year	Song	Production	Song by	Ref.
2nd	2021	"Husavik"	Eurovision Song Contest: The Story of Fire Saga	Savan Kotecha, Fat Max Gsus, and Rickard Göransson	
3rd	2022	"Just Look Up"	Don't Look Up	Nicholas Britell, Ariana Grande, Scott Mescudi, and Taura Stinson	
4th	2023	"Ciao Papa"	Guillermo del Toro's Pinocchio	Alexandre Desplat, Roeban Katz, and Guillermo del Toro	
5th	2024	"What Was I Made For?"	Barbie	Billie Eilish O'Connell and Finneas O'Connell	
6th	2025	"Compress/Repress"	Challengers	Trent Reznor, Atticus Ross, Luca Guadagnino	
7th	2026	"Golden"	KPop Demon Hunters	Ejae and Mark Sonnenblick	

==== Outstanding Original Score for Interactive Media ====
#	Year	Production	Music by	Ref.
1st	2020	Star Wars Jedi: Fallen Order	Gordy Haab and Stephen Barton	
2nd	2021	Metamorphosis	Garry Schyman and Mikolai Stroinski	
3rd	2022	Battlefield 2042	Hildur Guðnadóttir and Sam Slater	
4th	2023	Assassin’s Creed Valhalla: Dawn of Ragnarök	Stephanie Economou	
5th	2024	Star Wars Jedi: Survivor	Gordy Haab and Stephen Barton	
6th	2025	Wizardry: Proving Grounds of the Mad Overlord	Winifred Phillips	
7th	2026	Sword of the Sea	Austin Wintory	

==== David Raksin Award for Emerging Talent ====
#	Year	Production	Music By	Ref.
3rd	2022	Jupiter's Legacy	Stephanie Economou	
4th	2023	Star Trek: Strange New Worlds	Nami Melumad	
5th	2024	Home Is a Hotel	Catherine Joy	
6th	2025	Inside Out 2	Andrea Datzman	
7th	2026	Law of Man	Ching-Shan Chang	

==== Spirit of Collaboration Award ====
In addition, the group presents the non-competitive Spirit of Collaboration Award to a composer and filmmaker team.

#	Year	Composer	Filmmaker	Ref.
1st	2020	Thomas Newman	Sam Mendes	
2nd	2021	Terence Blanchard	Spike Lee	
3rd	2022	Carter Burwell	Joel and Ethan Coen	
4th	2023	Justin Hurwitz	Damien Chazelle	
5th	2024	Robbie Robertson	Martin Scorsese	
6th	2025	Harry Gregson-Williams	Ridley Scott	
