= Clément Ducol =

French film score composer

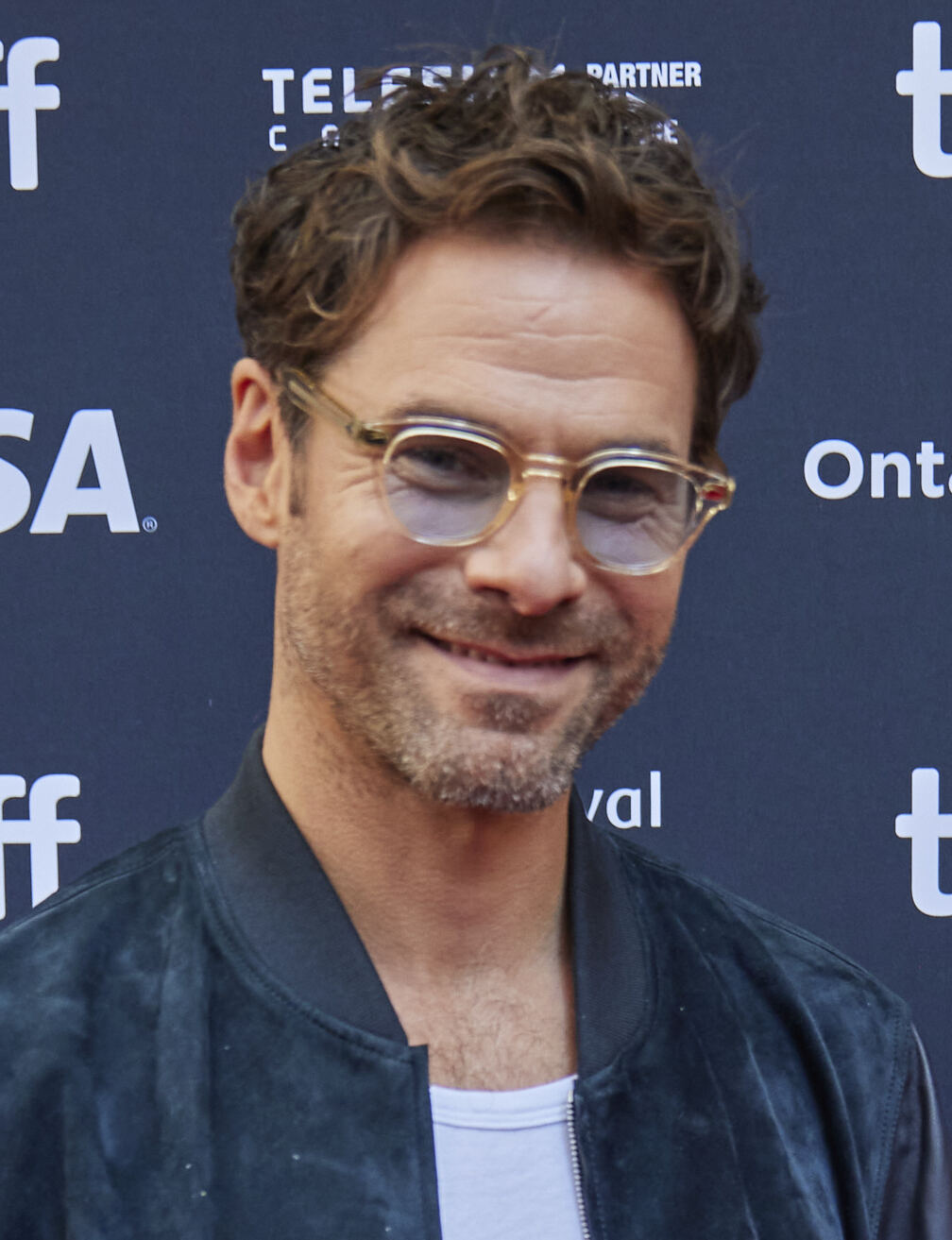
- Ducol in 2024
- Occupations: Multi-instrumentalist; composer; arranger

Clément Ducol is a French multi-instrumentalist, composer and arranger. As a film score composer, he is most noted for his work on the films Chicken for Linda! (Linda veut du poulet), for which he received a Lumière Award nomination for Best Music at the 29th Lumière Awards, and Emilia Pérez, for which he and Camille Dalmais won the Cannes Soundtrack Award at the 2024 Cannes Film Festival as well as the Academy Award for Best Original Song.

Ducol and Dalmais have been named as recipients of the Variety Artisan Award at the 2024 Toronto International Film Festival.
