= Emilia Pérez =

2024 film by Jacques Audiard

- Theatrical release poster
- Directed by: Jacques Audiard
- Written by: Jacques Audiard: in collaboration with; Thomas Bidegain; Léa Mysius; Nicolas Livecchi (Note: The film credits Audiard as writer, "in collaboration with" Bidegain, Mysius and Livecchi.)
- Based on: Emilia Pérez by Jacques Audiard; Écoute by Boris Razon
- Produced by: Jacques Audiard; Pascal Caucheteux; Valérie Schermann; Anthony Vaccarello
- Starring: Zoe Saldaña; Karla Sofía Gascón; Selena Gomez; Adriana Paz; Mark Ivanir; Édgar Ramírez
- Cinematography: Paul Guilhaume
- Edited by: Juliette Welfling
- Music by: Clément Ducol; Camille
- Production companies: Why Not Productions; Page 114; Pathé; France 2 Cinéma; Saint Laurent Productions
- Distributed by: Pathé Distribution
- Release dates: 18 May 2024 (Cannes); 21 August 2024 (France)
- Running time: 132 minutes
- Country: France
- Languages: Spanish; English
- Budget: €25 million (~$26 million)
- Box office: $16.3 million

Emilia Pérez (Latin American Spanish: [eˈmilja ˈpeɾes]) is a 2024 Spanish-language French musical crime film written and directed by Jacques Audiard. It is based on Audiard's opera libretto of the same name, which he loosely adapted from a chapter of the 2018 novel Écoute by French writer Boris Razon. The film follows a Mexican cartel leader (Karla Sofía Gascón) who aims to disappear and transition into a woman with the help of a lawyer (Zoe Saldaña). Selena Gomez, Adriana Paz, Mark Ivanir, and Édgar Ramírez also appear in starring roles.

Emilia Pérez had its world premiere on 18 May 2024 at the 77th Cannes Film Festival, where it won the Jury Prize and the Best Actress award for its female ensemble. It was theatrically released by Pathé in France on 21 August 2024. The film received generally positive reviews from critics in the United States and Europe, who praised the direction, music, performances and themes, but received backlash on multiple fronts. In Mexico, the film was panned by both audiences and critics, who criticized its cultural misrepresentation, songwriting, use of stereotypes, and Spanish dialogue. LGBTQ commentators were also critical of its depiction of transgender people.

Despite the polarized response, Emilia Pérez earned numerous accolades. At the 97th Academy Awards, the film led with 13 nominations and won two: Best Supporting Actress for Saldaña and Best Original Song for "El Mal". At the 82nd Golden Globe Awards, the film won four awards, including Best Motion Picture – Musical or Comedy and Best Motion Picture – Non-English Language, from 10 nominations. It also received 11 nominations at the 78th British Academy Film Awards, including Best Film, winning two.

== Plot ==
Rita Mora Castro, a struggling attorney in Mexico City, leads the defense in a murder case involving a prominent media figure's wife. Against her own conscience, Rita proceeds to argue that the woman died by suicide ("El alegato"). After winning the case, Rita receives an anonymous call with a mysterious but lucrative offer. Reflecting on her discontent, she agrees to a meeting ("Todo y nada"). Her client, revealed to be cartel kingpin Juan "Manitas" Del Monte, expresses the desire to covertly undergo gender-affirming surgery and begin a new and authentic life ("El encuentro") as a woman.

After consulting with doctors in Bangkok ("La vaginoplastia") and Tel Aviv ("Lady"), Rita finds a surgeon who agrees to perform the procedure after hearing Manitas's recollections of gender dysphoria during childhood ("Deseo"). Following the procedure, Manitas's wife, Jessi, and their children are relocated to Switzerland. Jessi pleads to go to the United States to be with her sister instead, but she is told that Switzerland was chosen for their safety. Rita is paid an exorbitant sum for her services. Meanwhile, Manitas fakes their death and begins a new life as Emilia Pérez.

Four years later in London, Rita encounters Emilia, who wants to reunite with her children ("Por casualidad"). Rita arranges for Jessi and the children to return to Mexico City to live with Emilia, introducing her as a distant, wealthy cousin of Manitas who has volunteered to help raise the children. Jessi does not recognize Emilia and opposes the arrangement, ultimately agreeing to return to Mexico only to reunite with Gustavo Brun, a past lover with whom she had an affair during the later years of her marriage ("Bienvenida").

Adjusting to their new life in Mexico, Rita and Emilia have a chance encounter with the mother of a missing child. Emilia reflects on her criminal past ("Mis siete hermanos y yo"). Later, as she is putting her son to bed, he says he still recognizes her scent ("Papá"). Remorseful, Emilia uses her connections with incarcerated cartel members to create a nonprofit that identifies the bodies of cartel victims ("Para") in order to return them to their families. Rita and Emilia collaborate in building the nonprofit and recruiting donors, some of whom, Rita notes, are dangerous and corrupt ("El Mal"). Epifanía, a woman whose abusive husband's remains were identified by the nonprofit, meets with Emilia to confirm his death. The two subsequently begin a relationship ("El amor").

Meanwhile, Jessi continues rekindling her relationship with Gustavo ("Mi camino"). She tells Emilia that the two plan to marry and move the family to a new home. When Emilia refers to the children as "mine" and becomes physically aggressive, Jessi flees with the children. After Emilia cuts off Jessi's allowance and threatens Gustavo into leaving Mexico, Jessi and Gustavo kidnap Emilia and demand ransom from Rita. She receives a package with a few of Emilia's severed fingers. Arriving at the designated location, Rita attempts to negotiate with Gustavo, but a shootout ensues with the security team Rita has hired to rescue Emilia.

Emilia finally reveals her true identity to Jessi, recounting intimate details of their first meeting and their wedding day ("Perdóname"). Gustavo and a confused Jessi load Emilia into the trunk of Gustavo's car and drive off. As Jessi slowly realizes what has happened, she becomes guilt-ridden and orders Gustavo to pull over, holding him at gunpoint. As the two struggle for the gun, the car veers off the road, killing Gustavo, Jessi, and Emilia.

Rita, devastated over Emilia's death, tells Emilia and Jessi's children what has happened and offers to be their guardian. Epifanía marches in the street singing Emilia's eulogy and celebrating her fight for truth and freedom ("Las damas que pasan").

== Cast ==
- Zoe Saldaña as Rita Mora Castro, a lawyer
- Karla Sofía Gascón as Emilia Pérez / Juan "Manitas" Del Monte, cartel kingpin who wants to covertly undergo gender-affirming surgery
- Selena Gomez as Jessica "Jessi" Del Monte, Manitas's US-raised wife and mother of their children
- Adriana Paz as Epifanía Flores, Emilia's lover
- Édgar Ramírez as Gustavo Brun, Jessi's lover
- Mark Ivanir as Dr. Wasserman, the doctor who performs gender reassignment surgery on Manitas

== Production ==
=== Development ===
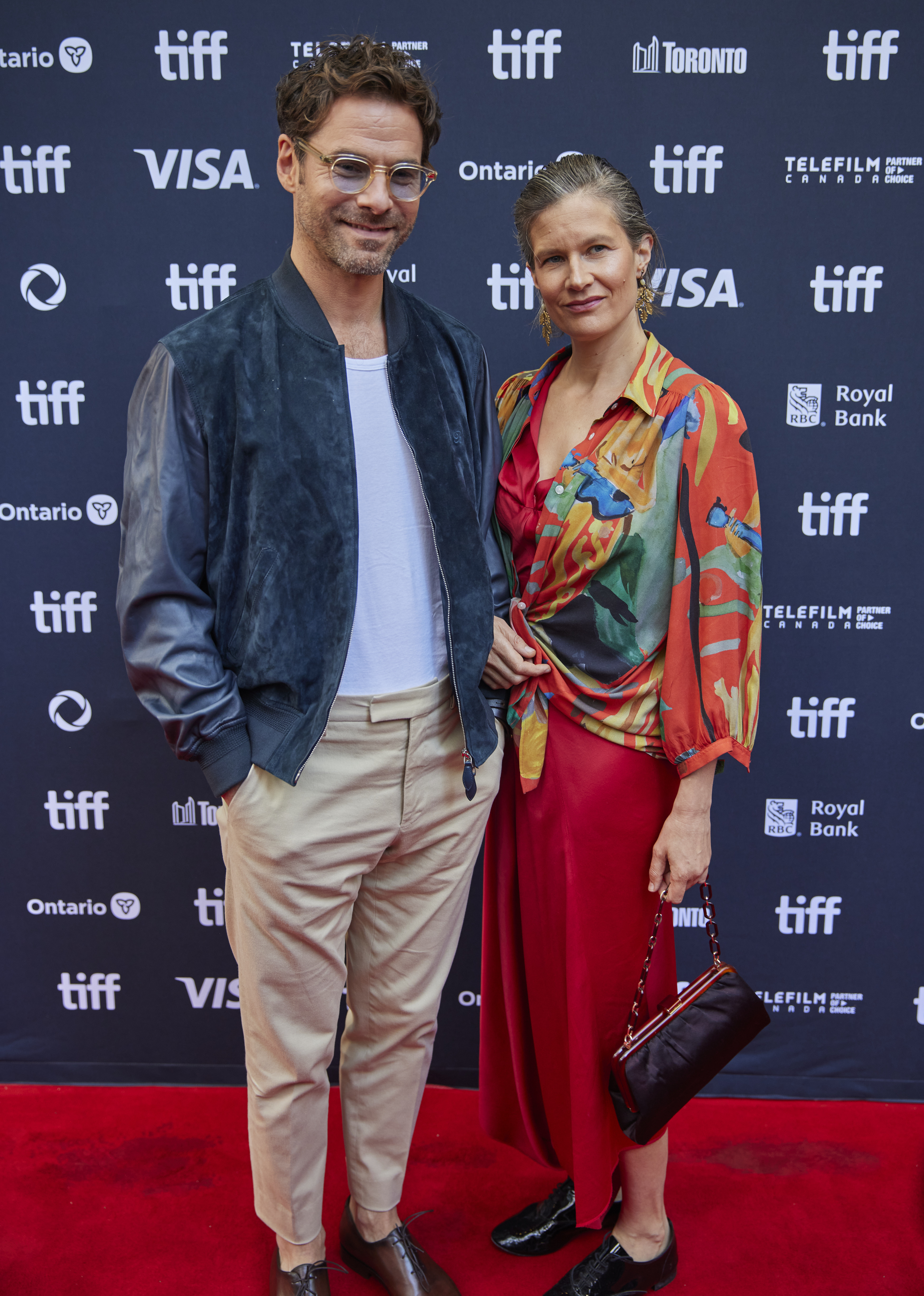
Composers Clément Ducol and Camille Dalmais at the 2024 Toronto International Film Festival

In January 2022, Télérama published a series of five-episode articles covering in detail Jacques Audiard's pre-production process. Audiard developed the screenplay from what was originally intended to be an opera libretto in four acts. The title character was inspired by a chapter from Boris Razon's 2018 novel Écoute. Emilia Pérez marks the first time Audiard has written a film alone. Previous co-writer Thomas Bidegain serves as a creative collaborator.

Clément Ducol and French singer Camille composed the film's original songs followed by the original score. Camille wrote the lyrics to the songs in Spanish with the assistance of Mexican translator Karla Aviles, and performed on the demo. Damien Jalet choreographed the musical sequences. Anthony Vaccarello, of fashion house Yves Saint Laurent, created the costumes.

=== Filming ===
Production was initially to begin in autumn 2022 but was delayed six months due to varying scheduling conflicts with the cast members. It was originally set to take place on location in Mexico but was moved to the Studios de Bry-Sur-Marne near Paris instead, in accordance with Audiard's wishes. The interior scenes included a reconstruction of an "authentic Mexican backdrop". Audiard stated that the studio setting would afford him the ability to "produce more form" and give him "more freedom for the parts that are sung and choreographed".

Principal photography began in May 2023 in the Île-de-France region, before wrapping on 5 July 2023. The film is produced by Pascal Caucheteux through his company Why Not Productions, and also by Audiard and Valérie Schermann through their company Page 114; in co-production with Pathé, France 2 Cinéma, and Vaccarello's Saint Laurent Productions, a division of Yves Saint Laurent.

Karla Sofía Gascón wished to portray Emilia Pérez both in the pre-surgery and post-surgery stages.

== Music ==
The soundtrack album features the film's original songs performed by cast members Zoe Saldaña, Gascón, Selena Gomez, Mark Ivanir, Adriana Paz and others, as well as the original score composed by Ducol and Camille. The soundtrack was first released digitally on 31 October 2024 by Sony Masterworks. An extended play (EP) featuring a selection of five songs from the soundtrack–"El alegato", "Para", "Papá", "El Mal" and "Las damas que pasan"–was released earlier on 5 September 2024.

== Release ==
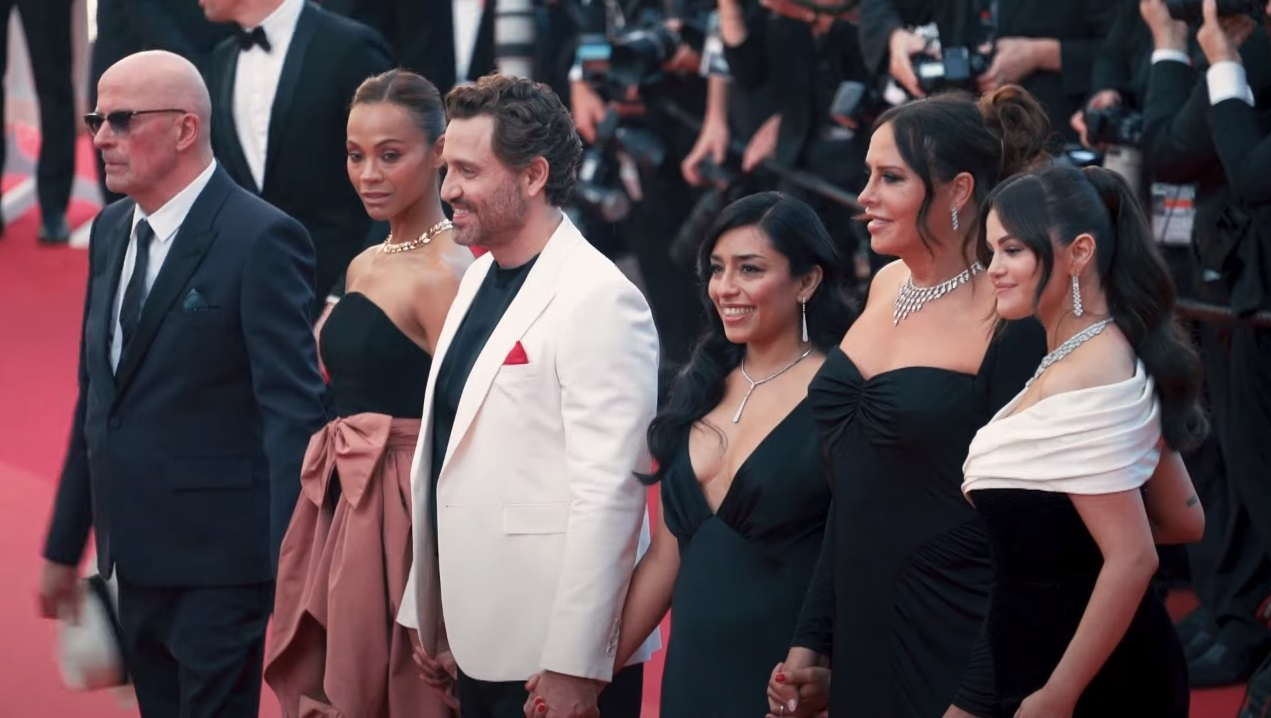
Audiard and the cast of Emilia Pérez (from left to right: Zoe Saldaña, Édgar Ramírez, Adriana Paz, Karla Sofía Gascón, and Selena Gomez) at the 2024 Cannes Film Festival

Emilia Pérez was selected to compete for the Palme d'Or at the 2024 Cannes Film Festival, where it had its world premiere on 18 May 2024. The film received a standing ovation.

Shortly after its premiere, Netflix beat out multiple studios and was in negotiations to acquire distribution rights to the film for North America and the United Kingdom for $12 million; the deal ultimately closed at $8 million instead. The film was theatrically released in France on 21 August 2024 by Pathé. World sales for international distribution were handled by The Veterans.

The film made its North American premiere at the 51st Telluride Film Festival. It played at the Toronto International Film Festival on 9 September 2024, at the San Sebastián International Film Festival ('Perlak' section), and it was selected in Icons at the 29th Busan International Film Festival to be screened in October 2024. Emilia Pérez has also been selected for the MAMI Mumbai Film Festival 2024 under the World Cinema section. The film opened the 22nd Morelia International Film Festival in October 2024. It received a limited theatrical release in the United States and Canada on 1 November, before debuting on Netflix on 13 November in the US, UK, and Canada. Netflix also spent more than $50 million on this film's Oscar campaign.

== Reception ==
=== Critical response ===
On the review aggregator website Rotten Tomatoes, 70% of 286 critics' reviews are positive, with an average rating of 6.6/10. The website's consensus reads: "Karla Sofía Gascón is Emilia Pérez in a swaggering musical crime thriller of genre-bending fascination that is also an unapologetically trans story." Metacritic, which uses a weighted average, assigned the film a score of 70 out of 100, based on 55 critics, indicating "generally favorable" reviews. On AlloCiné, the film received an average rating of 4.1 out of 5 stars, based on 38 reviews from French critics.

Kevin Maher from The Times rated the film 5 out of 5 stars, stating "this mad musical is one of the year's best films." Stephanie Zacharek of Time considered that a film such as Emilia Pérez feels "fierce and glorious, a radical act of the imagination with kindness in its heart". Manohla Dargis of The New York Times determined that "it's Gascón's performance that centers and grounds the story". Richard Brody of The New Yorker lamented that the film "presents twists and turns that exhaust themselves in the strain to stoke excitement; the movie is a wild ride to nowhere". Peter Bradshaw of The Guardian rated the film 3 out of 5 stars, billing it as a "slightly bizarre yet watchable musical", also writing that Gascón "carries it off with queenly flair".

Leonard Maltin called the film "unique and amazing", writing: "Phrases like 'game-changer' and 'cutting-edge' can't capture just how audacious and original Emilia Pérez is. [It's] a knock-out." Peter Travers described the film as an "unmissable movie event", writing: "You've never seen anything like Jacques Audiard's Spanish musical about violent passions starring Zoë Saldaña, Selena Gomez and trans actress Karla Sofia Gascón in career-defining performances that take a piece out of you. This you don't want to miss."

=== Lists ===
British film magazine Sight and Sound included the film in its 50 Best Films of 2024 list. American director John Waters placed the film in his Top 10 list of the best films of 2024. The film is included in Time's Top 10 list of the best films of 2024. It ranks No. 8 in Fotogramas' list of Top 10 Films of 2024. Deadline Hollywood film critics Damon Wise and Stephanie Bunbury have the film in each of their Top 10 lists. It ranks at No. 46 and No. 47 in The Guardian's US and UK lists respectively.

=== Industry response ===
Filmmakers Taylor Hackford and Denis Villeneuve both cited Emilia Pérez as one of their favorite films of 2024. James Cameron, who worked with Zoe Saldaña on the Avatar films, praised the film, calling it "bold" and "daring". Emily Blunt called the film "a singular experience". Meryl Streep praised the film and Gomez's performance, describing it as "beautiful, smudged, sensual, incredible". Director Michael Mann called it a "contemporary masterpiece". Fellow directors Paul Schrader, Maggie Betts, R.J. Cutler, Drew Goddard, Michael Gracey, Reinaldo Marcus Green and Nicole Holofcener listed the film as one of their favorites of 2024. Madonna, America Ferrera, Daisy Ridley, Eva Longoria, Jason Reitman, Jeremy O. Harris, Oliver Stone and other industry figures have also expressed admiration for the film.

Contrasting to the positive industry reaction, the reception found within Mexico's cultural sector was divided. Mexican filmmaker Guillermo del Toro remarked, "It's so beautiful to see a movie that is cinema". Furthermore, Mexican director and writer Issa López praised the film, calling it a "masterpiece". Conversely, Mexican cinematographer Rodrigo Prieto described the experience of watching the film as offensive and "completely inauthentic". In spite of being cast in the role of a non-native speaker, Gomez's Spanish diction generated abundant memes. She was described as "indefensible" for it by Eugenio Derbez, who later retracted his words after a greatly polarised online response, saying his comments were "indefensible and go against everything I stand for". Vogue writer Atenea Morales de la Cruz explains the reaction over Gomez's performance results in part because the film targets mainly an audience outside of Mexico.

=== Transgender representation ===
Critics and advocacy organisations in and from the LGBTQ community have been much more critical. Speaking for NPR's Pop Culture Happy Hour, critic Reanna Cruz said that "it seemed like the filmmaker was painting trans women as liars", while GLAAD called it "a profoundly retrograde portrayal of a trans woman" and "a step backward for trans representation". Drew Burnett Gregory, writing for Autostraddle, asked, "How many times do cis people have to learn about us before a portrayal like this one rings as false to them as it does to me?" Editors of the American LGBT magazine Them claimed the film perpetuates an idea of "transness so completely from the cis imagination". Lisa Laman of Culturess, meanwhile, lamented how Emilia Pérez was yet another trans-centric film that focused excessively on surgeries and only featured one trans character in its entire cast.

In El País, Paul B. Preciado described the film as "a polysemic amalgam loaded with racism and transphobia, anti-Latino exoticism and melodramatic binarism" which "reinforces the colonial and pathologizing narrative" of both gender transition and Mexican culture.

=== Reception in Mexico ===
Emilia Pérez has been harshly criticized in Mexico and Latin America. The film was the opening night film at the Morelia Film Festival in October 2024, and was released in Mexican theaters on 23 January 2025, grossing 9.4 million pesos in its first weekend. Carlos Aguilar of RogerEbert.com described the overall casting as "another patch in this glamorous pastiche". Prior to its national premiere, Audiard and actress Adriana Paz were to present the film at a special event at the Cineteca Nacional, with the presence of students from the Universidad Autónoma Metropolitana (UAM) Azcapotzalco, but both cancelled their participation for "logistical reasons".

The absence of Mexican actors in the main roles has been a source of controversy. In this sense, some people understood that the casting director, Carla Hool, suggested in some statements that there was a lack of talent in Mexico as a reason for the main actresses in the film not to be Mexican, but Hool commented as follows: "We did a big search, we were open, and we did a big search in Mexico, and in the US, Spain, in all Latin America [...], but at the end of the day, the best actors who embody these characters are the ones who are right here, right?", defending the performance of the selected actors. On the other hand, actress Adriana Paz, who plays a secondary character, is Mexican. Mexican screenwriter Hector Guillen said it was "really painful" that Hool, who is Mexican, has not found worthy talent in Mexico and Latin America. "The fact that there are a few Mexicans doesn't stop it from being a Eurocentric production," he said.

The lyrics of the song "Papá" performed by Emilia Pérez's son, alluding to the son's olfactory memories ("You smell like my dad, like Diet Coke with ice, lemon and sweat. Mezcal and guacamole") were decried as "simplistic" and "ridiculous" on social media. A parody short film, Johanne Sacreblu, set in France and featuring stereotypical French accents but starring Mexicans and filmed in Mexico, was released by Camila Aurora González, a trans Mexican content creator. The film went viral on social networks, to the extent that Vanity Fair France described it as "revenge" by Mexicans against the film, mentioning that the short film uses all kinds of clichés about the country, such as sailor shirts, mustaches, baguettes, the bad smell of French people and the presence of rats in the streets, as a counterweight to the Mexican stereotypes that she claims the original film presents.

In March 2025, after her Academy Award win, Saldaña stated about the film: "I'm very, very sorry that [...] so many Mexicans felt offended. That was never our intention. We spoke from a place of love. [...] For me, the heart of this movie was not Mexico. We were making a film about friendship. We were making a film about four women. These women could have been Russian, could have been Dominican, could have been black from Detroit, could have been from Israel, could have been from Gaza. And these women are still very universal women that are struggling every day, but trying to survive systemic oppression and trying to find the most authentic voices. So I will stand by that, but I'm also always open to sit down with all of my Mexican brothers and sisters, with love and respect, [to have] a great conversation on how Emilia could have been done better."

==== Addressing the issue of drug trafficking ====
Both critics and audiences resented the lack of "sensitivity and context" on the issue of drug trafficking, with some Mexican journalists and influencers calling it "narcomusical". The film was also criticised as an "insensitive caricature" that is an apologism to drug traffickers.

After being questioned about the reception of the film in Mexico, which had not yet been officially released in the country at the time, Mexican actress Adriana Paz, part of the cast of Emilia Pérez, defended her work and recalled that the film is a work of fiction, arguing that "it is an operetta in which people sing and do things that we would not do in reality. All opinions are acceptable, what I find ugly is the violence with which they are expressed".

==== Statements by Claudia Sheinbaum ====
In January 2025, during her daily morning press conference, Las Mañaneras, the President of Mexico, Claudia Sheinbaum, defended freedom of expression and rejected censorship. She also emphasized the need for Mexico to be recognized for its history, culture, and traditions, not for negative stereotypes of drug trafficking that she believes the film could reinforce. She noted that tourism continues to grow in Mexico, indicating that the country's image is not damaged, and highlighted the pride of the Mexican people and the importance of promoting their cultural richness. She considered that the French film, by addressing the issues of drug trafficking and disappearances, could be validating prejudices and a distorted European view of Mexico, something that does not align with the country's reality.

== Controversy ==
=== Film crew comments ===
==== Jacques Audiard ====
Several statements by the film's director, Jacques Audiard, generated controversy. In an interview he implied that he had not studied the Mexican context in depth: "No, I didn't study that much. What I had to understand I already knew a little", although these statements, originally in French, were translated at the time by someone else.

In another interview, Jacques Audiard stated that "Spanish is a language of emerging countries, of modest countries, of poor people and migrants". Audiard later claimed that his comments were taken out of context and that he actually has a great appreciation for the Spanish language: "What has been said is the opposite of what I think". Audiard also said that they wanted bigger-name stars instead of Mexicans in order to be able to finance the film.

==== Karla Sofía Gascón ====
The vehement defence of the film on social networks by the lead actress was heavily criticized by internet users in Latin America.

Gascón's controversial tweets from recent years resurfaced in January 2025, in which she verbally attacked Muslims and George Floyd, expressed anti-Chinese and anti-Catalan sentiments, and when she mocked the 93rd Academy Awards calling it an "Afro-Korean festival". These posts caused backlash from the public, leading Gascón to apologise and delete her X (formerly Twitter) account.

To address the controversy, Gascón arranged an hour-long TV interview with CNN en Español, where she became emotional and repeated that she was not racist throughout the interview and compared her struggles to the struggles of black people, which eventually intensified the backlash since viewers considered the segment as "hollow" and disliked the comments she made throughout it. The backlash extended to Gascón's co-star Zoe Saldaña. Following these statements, Netflix decided to no longer fund Gascón's travel or fashion for the remainder of awards season and removed her from Emilia Pérez's awards campaign, releasing a new poster excluding her and enlisting the film's numerous wins and big nomination tallies.

Jacques Audiard stated that he was no longer in contact with Gascón after her apology. Following Audiard's comments, Gascón posted a statement on Instagram, stating that she would step back in hope that her silence would "allow the film to be appreciated for what it is, a beautiful ode to love and difference". She reiterated her apology about the tweets she made. Amid controversy surrounding the film, including attention to Gascón's resurfaced social-media posts, Gomez said that "some of the magic has disappeared," while adding that she remained proud of her work.

While Gascón did not attend the 39th Goya Awards, the controversy surrounding her statements was present throughout the event. On the red carpet, several Spanish film and industry personalities, such as director J. A. Bayona and rapper C. Tangana, expressed their sadness at the situation, with Bayona calling it a "lynching" while highlighting the quality of Emilia Pérez. In February 2025, it was announced that Gascón would attend both the 50th Cesar Awards and the 97th Academy Awards.

== Accolades ==
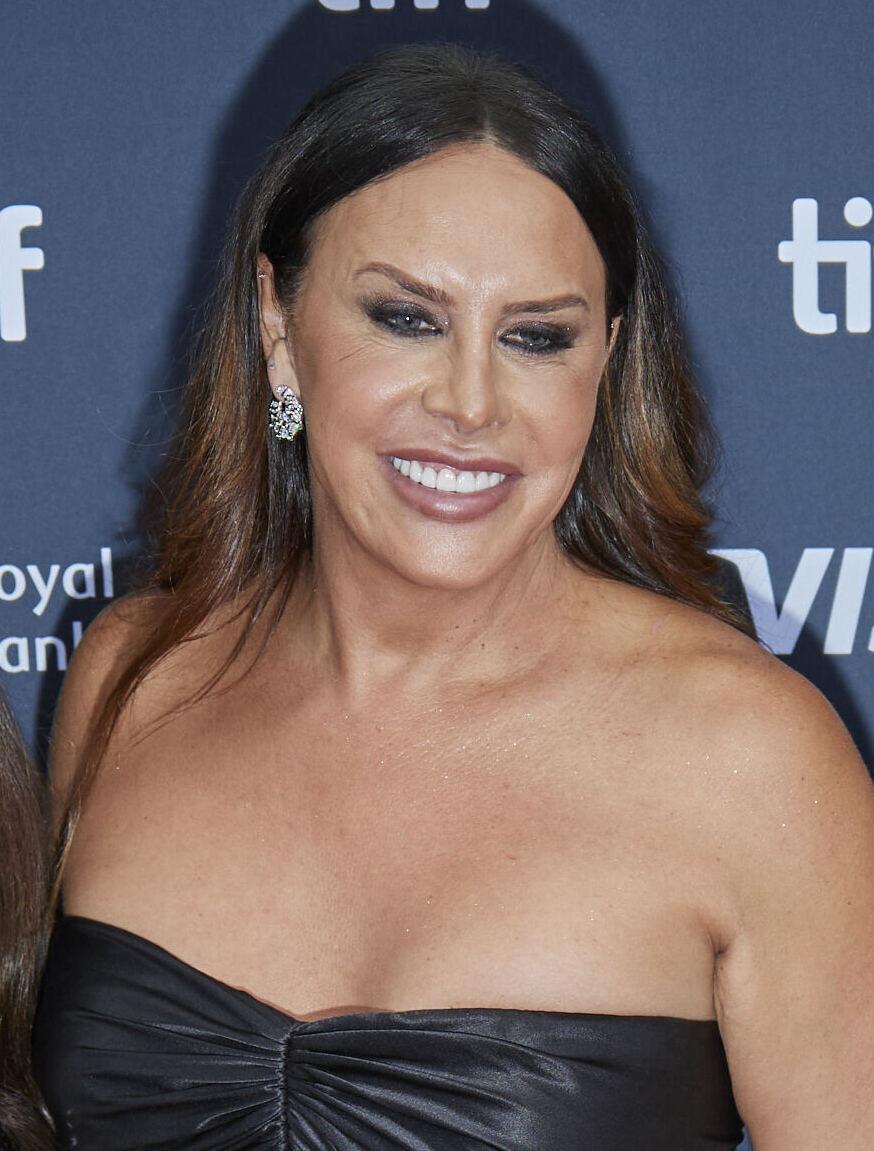
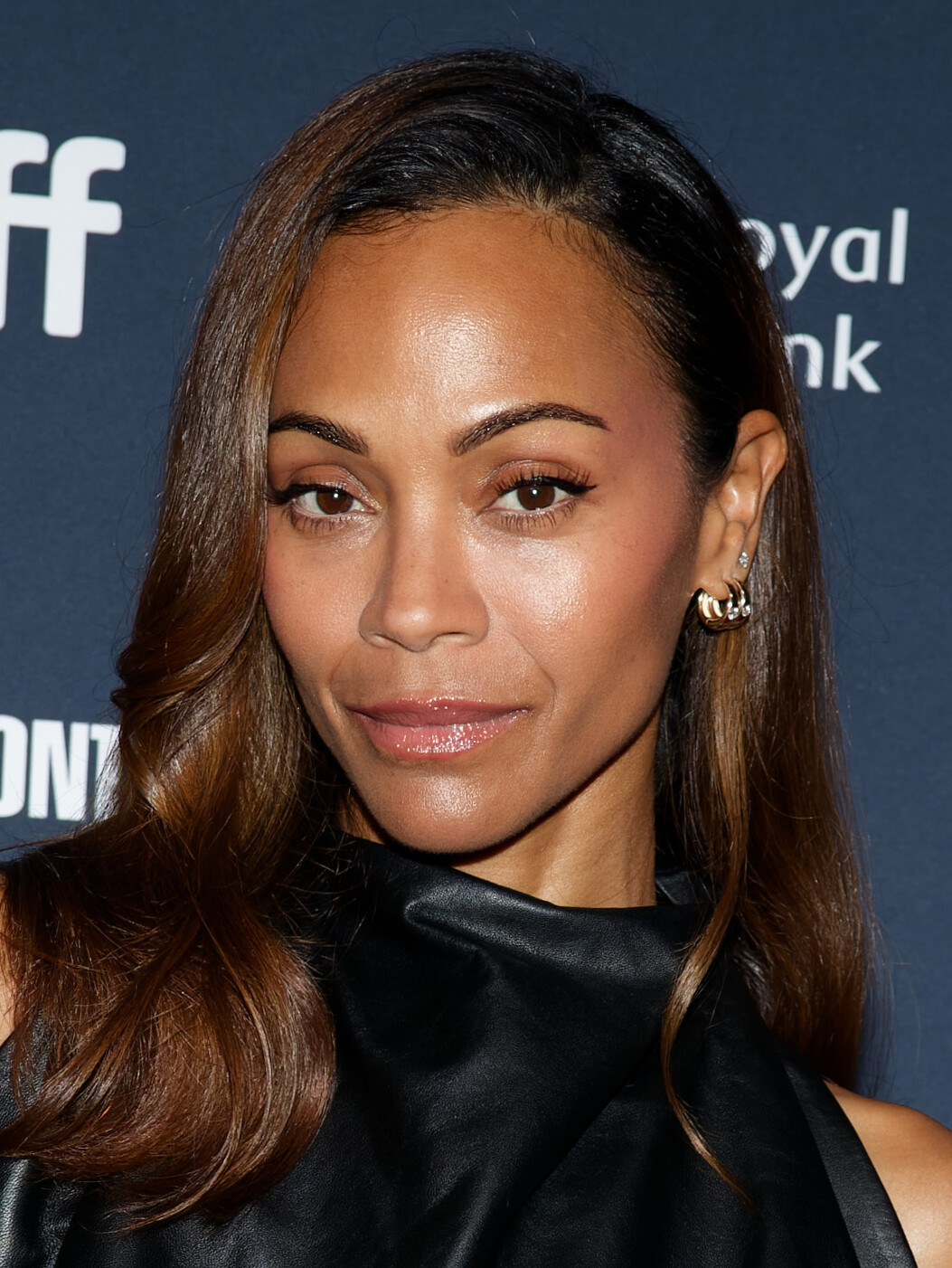
Karla Sofía Gascón and Zoe Saldaña earned Academy Award nominations for Best Actress and Best Supporting Actress for their performances, with Saldaña winning.

At the 2024 Cannes Film Festival, stars Karla Sofía Gascón, Selena Gomez, Adriana Paz, and Zoe Saldaña collectively won the Best Actress Award, while director Jacques Audiard won the Jury Prize, and Clément Ducol and Camille won the Soundtrack Award. The film was also nominated for the Palme d'Or and the Queer Palm. It was also named one of the Top 10 Films of 2024 by the American Film Institute.

At the 97th Academy Awards, Emilia Pérez received a leading 13 nominations, including Best Picture, Best Director for Audiard, Best Actress for Gascón, who became the first openly transgender actor nominated for an Oscar, and Best Supporting Actress for Saldaña. The film ultimately won two awards: Best Supporting Actress for Saldaña and Best Original Song for "El Mal". At the 82nd Golden Globe Awards, Emilia Pérez won four awards, including Best Motion Picture – Musical or Comedy and Best Motion Picture – Non-English Language, from 10 nominations. Emilia Pérez is also the most-nominated non-English-language film at both ceremonies.

Emilia Pérez received 11 nominations at the 78th British Academy Film Awards, including Best Film, Best Director, Best Actress in a Leading Role for Gascón, and Best Actress in a Supporting Role for both Gomez and Saldaña, winning for Saldaña and Best Film Not in the English Language. The film received three nominations at the 31st Screen Actors Guild Awards: Outstanding Performance by a Cast in a Motion Picture for Gascón, Gomez, Paz, and Saldaña, Outstanding Performance by a Female Actor in a Leading Role for Gascón, and Outstanding Performance by a Female Actor in a Supporting Role for Saldaña, with the latter winning.

Emilia Pérez received 13 nominations at the 50th César Awards, including Best Film, Best Director, and Best Actress for both Gascón and Saldaña, winning seven. The film also won five European Film Awards, including Best Film, Best Director, and Best Actress for Gascón. At the 30th Critics' Choice Awards, the film received 10 nominations, including Best Picture, Best Director, Best Actress for Gascón, Best Supporting Actress for Saldaña, and Best Acting Ensemble. The film won three awards: Best Supporting Actress (Saldaña), Best Foreign Language Film, and Best Song ("El Mal").

Several commentators were critical of its awards season dominance, considering the film "Oscar bait". (Note: Attributed to multiple references:)

== See also ==
- List of submissions to the 97th Academy Awards for Best International Feature Film
- List of French submissions for the Academy Award for Best International Feature Film

== Works cited ==
- Brody, Richard (11 November 2024). "'Emilia Pérez' is an Incurious Musical About a Trans Drug Lord". The New Yorker.
- Keslassy, Elsa (29 February 2024). "Anthony Vaccarello's Saint Laurent Productions Boards Jacques Audiard's 'Emilia Perez' Starring Zoe Saldana". Variety. Archived from the original on 17 May 2024.
- Keslassy, Elsa (18 January 2023). "'Emilia Perez,' Starring Selena Gomez and Zoe Saldaña, to Begin Filming This Spring". Variety. Archived from the original on 19 January 2023.
- Keslassy, Elsa (23 January 2023). "Jacques Audiard Details His Selena Gomez-Starring Musical 'Emilia Perez' (Exclusive)". Variety. Archived from the original on 26 May 2024.
- Keslassy, Elsa (23 May 2024). "Netflix Nearing Deal for Jacques Audiard's Buzzy Palme d'Or Contender 'Emilia Perez' Starring Zoe Saldaña, Selena Gomez, Karla Sofía Gascón (Exclusive)". Variety. Archived from the original on 26 May 2024.
- Ravindran, Manori; Frater, Patrick; Keslassy, Elsa (13 July 2023). "Actors Strike: Global Biz Braces for Impact as 'Gladiator 2,' 'Mortal Kombat 2' Prepare to Stop Filming". Variety. Archived from the original on 15 August 2023.
- Richford, Rhonda (6 July 2023). "Zoe Saldana, Eiza González and Naomi Watts Front Star-studded Crowd at Fendi". Women's Wear Daily. Archived from the original on 20 December 2023.
- Rigoulet, Laurent (24 January 2022). "À la recherche d'"Emilia Pérez" : le projet fou de Jacques Audiard". Télérama (in French). Archived from the original on 19 May 2024.
- Setoodeh, Ramin; Jackson, Angelique (18 May 2024). "Selena Gomez Weeps as 'Emilia Pérez' Earns Biggest Cannes Standing Ovation So Far at 9 Minutes". Variety. Archived from the original on 19 May 2024.
- Zacharek, Stephanie (4 December 2024). "The 10 Best Movies of 2024". TIME. Archived from the original on 6 December 2024.
- Zacharek, Stephanie (13 November 2024). "Emilia Pérez Is an Exuberant Ode to Human Possibility". Time. Archived from the original on 31 December 2024.
