= Delia's Gone =

Delia's Gone may refer to:

- Delia's Gone (film), an American-Canadian drama film
- "Delia's Gone", a number of songs inspired by the murder of Delia Green
