= Johanne Sacreblu =

2025 Mexican short film by Camila D. Aurora

- Promotional poster
- Directed by: Camila Aurora; Gladys L. Grantt
- Written by: Camila Aurora González
- Screenplay by: Héctor Guillén
- Parody of: Emilia Pérez
- Starring: Camila Aurora; Marina Fernanda Landeros; Yeylán Torres
- Release date: January 25, 2025 (Worldwide)
- Running time: 29 minutes
- Country: Mexico
- Budget: 30000 to 35000 Mex$

Johanne Sacreblu is a 2025 Mexican comedy musical short film directed by filmmaker Camila Aurora and written by Héctor Guillén, created as a protest against the French film Emilia Pérez.

The film premiered on YouTube in January 2025 and makes use of elements stereotypically associated with French culture, such as mimes, croissants, baguettes, and rats; it also features attire including berets, striped clothing, and thin mustaches, as a parody of the simplistic way in which director Jacques Audiard portrayed Mexican culture in Emilia Pérez.

== Plot ==
Johanne Sacreblu, a trans woman formerly known as Jonathan Sacreblu, returns home to Villa Croissant, a picturesque French town, after spending some time as a rancher in Mexico. Her family, who runs France's largest baguette shop and have appointed Johanne as their heir, are enraged at her for transitioning, as they feel that it would not be a good look for her when she takes over the family business, despite her iterating that she does not want it. At the same time, the Sacreblu family's business rivals, the Ratatouille family, who runs France's largest croissant shop, are also berating their son Agtugo, a trans man, for being an unfit heir to their business due to being born a woman. Both families decide to put the two in a bread-making competition.

That night, Johanne talks to her friend Emily and Marie Antoinette's ghost about her lack of enthusiasm for the competition and her discomfort with France's rampant discrimination. The next day, the first round of the competition, hosted by Ladybug and Cat Noir, takes place, in which Johanne and Agtugo are told to race by foot to the Eiffel Tower (depicted on screen through a similar-looking radio tower in Mexico City). Johanne wins, and Agtugo is scorned by his family for losing. Later that night, a man named Jacques Audiard laments being made of garbage.

Johanne meets with Agtugo at night, and tells him her desire to eliminate the racism and sexism in the country. The two end up falling in love and agree to tie in the next round, which had the goal of wrongfully deporting Muslims, in order to spread their message. They tie during the competition the next day, but various French government leaders refuse to accept the result and demand the two engage in a baguette duel to the death.

The duel takes place in the style of a silent film. After Johanne and Agtugo publicly refuse to engage in the duel, French ambassador Papa Johns arrives with Agtugo's brother Chofls and Johanne's family butler Wigles and threatens to kill both of them with French fries. After he stabs Agtugo, Johanne reveals that Papa Johns is being controlled by a rat on his head. Papa Johns admits this, revealing that he uses the rat's secrets for evil. Wigles then kills Papa Johns, explaining that his willingness to work with him was a result of Stockholm syndrome.

Some time later, Johanne is interviewed by a reporter about the incident. To conclude the interview, Johanne announces that she has a gift she brought back from Mexico. The gift is a cake, and the film ends with a freeze frame as she is about to slam the cake into the interviewer's face. In a post-credits scene, Johanne's mother finishes recounting the story to Johanne and Agtugo's son and tenderly sings a song about how bad he smells (satirizing "Papa," a song from Emilia Pérez in which Emilia's son sings about how his father smelled like spicy food, guacamole, and cigarettes).

== Background ==
Emilia Pérez was not well received in Mexico and Latin America. It was criticized for the lack of Mexican actors in a story set in Mexico, for being filmed in France instead of Mexico, and for portraying Mexican reality—including critical social issues such as drug trafficking and enforced disappearances—in a superficial and stereotypical manner. Additionally, the trans community expressed dissatisfaction with how the titular character was portrayed and many internet users and public figures questioned and mocked Selena Gomez’s accent.

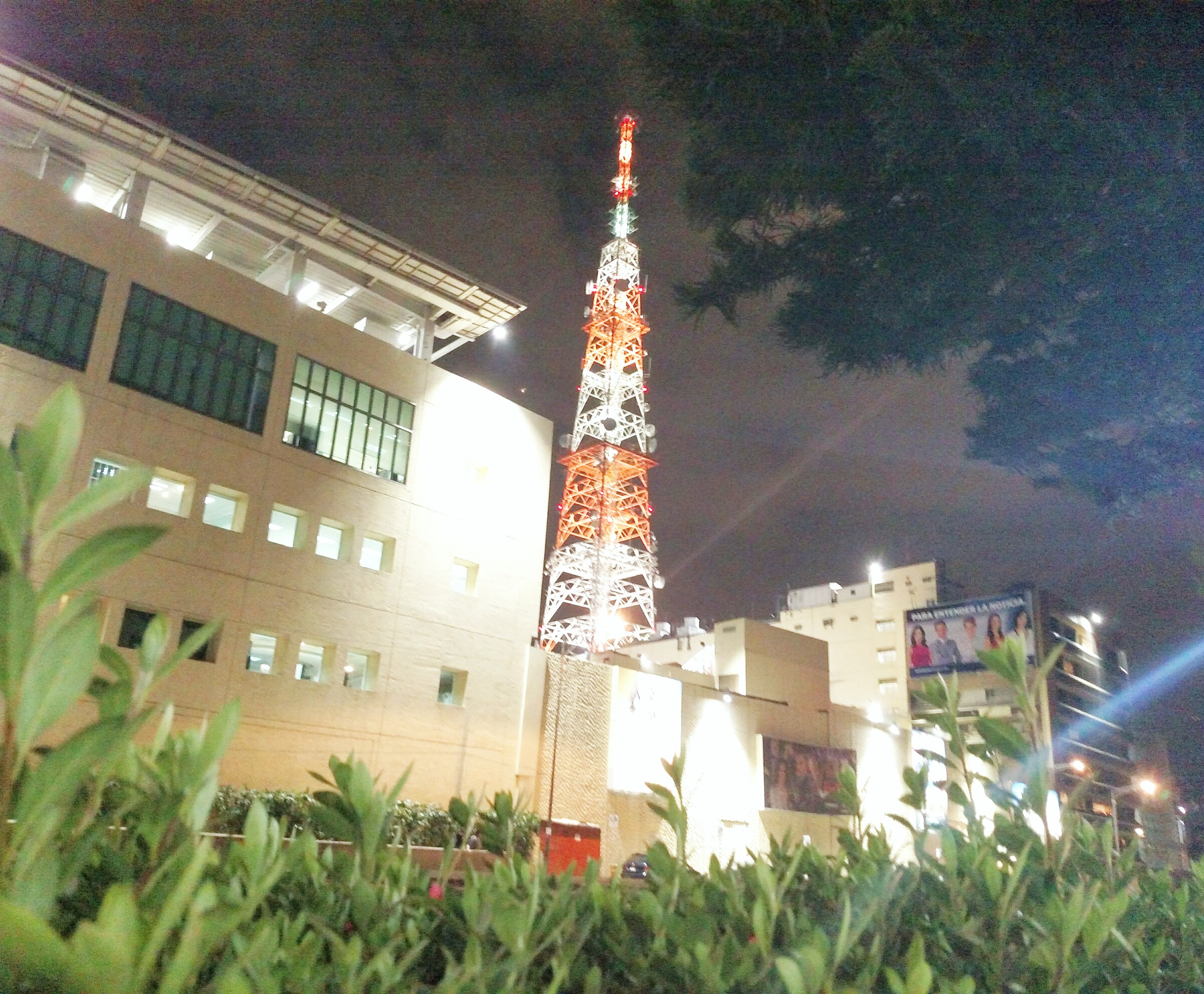
The Televisa Chapultepec Studios radio tower was used as a stand in for the Eiffel Tower

== Production ==
Camila D. Aurora, a Mexican trans woman, expressed dissatisfaction with Emilia Pérez on her TikTok account. Her video reached thousands of people, leading to the idea of creating a short film that would mock Emilia Pérez and protest how international cinema portrays Latin American realities. Camila Aurora launched a GoFundMe campaign to finance the film on January 16, 2025; it reached its goal a few days later.

== Critical reception ==
=== Audience ===
Public reception of Johanne Sacreblu has been overwhelmingly positive, so much that it was considered for a theatrical release in Mexico. Many clips from the film went viral and an extended version of the film was shown in theaters in Mexico on February 14, 2025, complete with an unreleased song. The ticket sales from the release were pledged to madres buscadoras and other civil society organizations.
