= Jane McGregor =

Canadian actress

- Born: 1983 (age 42–43); Vancouver, British Columbia, Canada
- Occupation: Actress
- Years active: 1994–present

Jane McGregor (born 1983) is a Canadian actress, known for her roles in Slap Her... She's French (2002), Flower & Garnet (2002), and That Beautiful Somewhere (2006), as well as her recurring role on the television series Robson Arms.

== Personal life ==
McGregor was born in 1983, and still resides in her native Vancouver. She has a sister. McGregor would like to work with Christopher Guest and considers Lucille Ball her favourite comedian. She enjoys interviews, but hates auditioning.

== Career ==
McGregor's career began with classes at the Vancouver Youth Theatre at the age of eight, which were followed by toy commercials. Her first television appearance was a guest role on two episodes of the Canadian television series The Odyssey, as 'Linda'. Following this she appeared in a string of made-for-television movies.

In 1999, McGregor appeared in an episode of the Disney series So Weird as Gabe Crawford, the girlfriend of a lead character.

In 2002, she starred as the popular Texas cheerleader Starla Grady in Slap Her... She's French with Piper Perabo, and followed the American comedy with Canadian independent film Flower & Garnet, where she plays an isolated, pregnant teenager. Also in 2002, she won the Women In Film And Video Vancouver Artistic Merit Award for Flower & Garnet and Bitten.

In 2005, she appeared in an episode of Supernatural as a preacher's daughter, and had a small part playing Keri Russell's sister in the Hallmark Hall of Fame drama The Magic of Ordinary Days.

In 2006, she portrayed Catherine Nyland, an archaeologist suffering from debilitating migraines in That Beautiful Somewhere, opposite Roy Dupuis. From 2005 to 2008 she had a recurring role as Alicia Plecas in the Canadian series Robson Arms, and in 2007 she appeared in American Venus as Jenna Lane, a competitive ice skater hovering on the brink of a mental breakdown due to her controlling mother (portrayed by Rebecca De Mornay).

She has taught acting at Biz Studios, and currently teaches a Teen Intensive at Vada Studios in Vancouver.

Most recently, McGregor has had guest roles on The Listener, Almost Human, and FX’s Fargo.

== Filmography ==
=== Film ===
Year	Title	Role	Director	Notes
1996	Live TV	Nila	Annie O'Donoghue	Short
2002	Slap Her... She's French	Starla Grady	Melanie Mayron	Released 18 July 2002 in Canada
2002	Bang Bang You're Dead	Jenny Dahlquist	Guy Ferland	Premiered 7 June 2002 at the Seattle International Film Festival
2002	Bitten	Daughter	Claudia Morgado	Short; Premiered 8 August 2002 at the Montreal World Film Festival
2002	Flower & Garnet	Flower	Keith Behrman	Premiered 26 August 2002 at the Montreal World Film Festival
2006	That Beautiful Somewhere	Catherine Nyland	Robert Budreau	Premiered 26 August 2006 at the Montreal World Film Festival
2006	Citizen Duane	Molly Buckley	Michael Mabbott	Premiered 8 September 2006 at the Toronto International Film Festival
2007	American Venus	Jennifer "Jenna" Lane	Bruce Sweeney	Premiered 8 September 2007 at the Toronto International Film Festival
2013	Penguins (Are So Sensitive to My Needs)	Det. Rowe	Matthew Kowalchuk	Short; Released 1 May 2013 in Canada
2016	The 9th Life of Louis Drax	Sophie	Alexandre Aja	Limited release on 2 September 2016 in Canada
2017	A Dog's Purpose	Rachel	Lasse Hallström	Released 27 January 2017 in Canada
2019	Two/One	Agnes	Juan Cabral	Released 28 April 2019 at Tribeca Film Festival

=== Television ===
Year	Title	Role	Notes
1994	The Odyssey	Linda	Episodes: 3.8 "Styx and Stones", 3.13 "Time Bomb"
1998	You, Me and the Kids		Episode: 1.14 "Smoke Alarm"
1998	Noah	Kathy Simmons	TV film
1999	Two of Hearts	Sarah Saunders	TV film
1999	So Weird	Gabe Crawford	Episode: 1.7 "Angel"
1999	The Patty Duke Show: Still Rockin' in Brooklyn Heights	Molly Harrison	TV film
1999	Our Guys: Outrage at Glen Ridge	Diane Carter	TV film
1999	Hayley Wagner, Star	Mira	TV film
1999	Poltergeist: The Legacy	Patricia Spiro	Episode: 4.18 "Gaslight"
1999	Y2K	Kelly Cromwell	TV film
2000	Live Through This	Darby Parsons	Main role
2005	The Magic of Ordinary Days	Abby	TV film
2005	Young Blades	Mireille	Episode: 1.5 "Da Vinci's Notebook"
2005	Supernatural	Lori Sorenson	Episode: 1.7 "Hook Man"
2005–08	Robson Arms	Alicia Plecas-Fochs	Recurring role
2007	The 4400	Vanessa Martin	Episode: 4.3 "Audrey Parker's Come and Gone"
2007	Fallen	Deborah	Episode: 1.3 "Someone Always Has to Die"
2011	Fringe	Julie	Episode: 4.7 "Wallflower"
2013	The Dark Corner	Dana Rosten	Web miniseries
2013	The Listener	Jennifer Cowell	Episode: 4.8 "The Illustrated Woman"
2013	Almost Human	Kelly Cooper	Episode: 1.4 "The Bends"
2014	Fargo	Nurse Faber	Episode: 1.6 "Buridan's Ass"
2014	Signed, Sealed, Delivered	Kelly	Episode: 1.7 "Something Good"
2016	Newlywed and Dead	Jay's Mother	TV film
2020	Snowpiercer	Astrid	Episodes: "Without Their Maker", "Justice Never Boarded", "The Universe Is Indifferent", "These Are His Revolutions"
