= Slap Her... She's French =

- Theatrical release poster
- Directed by: Melanie Mayron
- Written by: Lamar Damon; Robert Lee King
- Produced by: Beau Flynn; Jonathan King; Matthias Deyle
- Starring: Piper Perabo; Jane McGregor; Trent Ford; Julie White; Brandon Smith; Michael McKean
- Cinematography: Charles Minsky
- Edited by: Marshall Harvey
- Music by: David Michael Frank
- Production companies: Constantin Film; Bandeira Entertainment; Key Entertainment; IMF 2
- Distributed by: Constantin Film (Germany); Universal Pictures (United Kingdom); ABC Family (United States)
- Release dates: February 7, 2002 (Germany); October 18, 2002 (United Kingdom); January 9, 2005 (United States)
- Running time: 92 minutes
- Countries: United States; United Kingdom; Germany
- Language: English
- Box office: $1.7 million

Slap Her... She's French is a 2002 teen black comedy film directed by Melanie Mayron and starring Piper Perabo and Jane McGregor. In the United States, the film premiered on ABC Family on January 9, 2005, under the title She Gets What She Wants.

== Plot ==
High school student Starla Grady is the popular head cheerleader and pageant queen of the small town of Splendora, Texas, who aspires to be a news anchorwoman. She hosts a French exchange student, an orphan named Genevieve Le Plouff. The seemingly shy and harmless Genevieve is immediately in awe of Starla's beauty and popularity. However, after winning the affections of Starla's parents, friends, and boyfriend Kyle, Genevieve soon begins to take over Starla's life.

When Starla is forced to quit the cheerleading squad after receiving a failing grade in French, Genevieve moves in to take her place, and then the roles are reversed. Soon, Genevieve is the popular head cheerleader, and Starla is the unpopular student. Genevieve also replaces Starla in the Junior News Anchor Competition, and, framed by Genevieve, Starla is arrested for possessing a knife and getting high on mushrooms. She is then bailed out of jail by her younger brother Randolph and her classmate Ed Mitchell. Starla eventually learns that Genevieve was, in fact, a former elementary school classmate named Clarissa Fogelsey, whom Starla had embarrassed so badly that she felt compelled to move to France and has returned in disguise to exact revenge on Starla.

With her charade exposed, Genevieve leaves town in disgrace, and Starla reclaims her status in school and town. Although Starla never achieved her goals of winning the college scholarship, she now feels that she is a changed person. She also begins a relationship with Ed after breaking up with Kyle. Meanwhile, Genevieve, posing as Starla, is welcomed by her new adoptive French family upon her arrival in Paris.

== Cast ==
- Jane McGregor as Starla Grady
- Piper Perabo as Genevieve LePlouff
- Trent Ford as Ed Mitchell
- Alexandra Adi as Ashley Lopez
- Nicki Aycox as Tanner Jennings
- Jesse James as Randolph Grady
- Julie White as Bootsie Grady
- Brandon Mychal Smith as Arnie Grady
- Matt Czuchry as Kyle Fuller
- Christen Coppen as Doreen Gilmore
- Michael McKean as Monsieur Duke
- Haley Ramm as young Starla Grady (uncredited)
- Ashley Blake as Megan
- Laura Halvorson as Beef Band fiddle player
- John Dones as Iced out audience member
- Ryan Faries as Iced out audience member

== Production ==
The film was written by Lamar Damon and Robert Lee King, with a rewrite by Alan Ball.

Melanie Mayron replaced director Evan Dunsky ten days into shooting. It was filmed in Dallas and Fort Worth, Texas, on 1 November 2000 to 15 December 2000.

== Reception ==
On Rotten Tomatoes, Slap Her... She's French has an approval rating of 38%, based on 24 reviews, with an average rating of 4.9/10. On Metacritic, the film has a score of 44 out of 100, based on 4 critics, indicating "mixed or average reviews".

Derek Elley of Variety wrote: "Scripters Robert Lee King and Lamar Damon leave no national cliché or double entendre unturned in this good-looking but relentlessly lowbrow outing which plays like 'Clueless Does South Fork' with a side order of garlic."
