= Écoute (novel) =

Novel by Boris Razon

Écoute is a French-language novel by Boris Razon.

It is the author's second novel. It is a reworking of An Attempt at Exhausting a Place in Paris by Georges Perec but as a work of fiction. It revolves around a smartphone and surveillance. Razon commented on increasing surveillance.

One part is about a person involved in moving illegal drugs who transitions into being a woman so the person would resemble the first woman they had loved. This segment of the novel was an inspiration for the film Emilia Pérez. PBS SoCal stated that the person "wasn’t that developed over the following chapters".
