= Born to Be Blue (film) =

2015 drama film

- Theatrical release poster
- Directed by: Robert Budreau
- Written by: Robert Budreau
- Produced by: Jennifer Jonas; Robert Budreau; Leonard Farlinger; Jake Seal
- Starring: Ethan Hawke; Carmen Ejogo; Callum Keith Rennie
- Cinematography: Steve Cosens
- Edited by: David Freeman
- Music by: David Braid; Todor Kobakov; Steve London
- Production companies: New Real Films; Lumanity; (in association with Productivity Media and Entertainment One Films)
- Distributed by: Entertainment One (Canada); K5 International; Universal Pictures (United Kingdom)
- Release dates: 13 September 2015 (TIFF); 11 March 2016 (Canada)
- Running time: 97 minutes
- Countries: Canada; United Kingdom
- Language: English
- Budget: <$10 million
- Box office: $1.5 million

Born to Be Blue is a 2015 Canadian-British biographical drama film written, coproduced and directed by Robert Budreau. It stars Ethan Hawke, Carmen Ejogo, Callum Keith Rennie, Janet-Laine Green and Stephen McHattie. It was shown in the Special Presentations section of the 2015 Toronto International Film Festival. The film is about American jazz musician Chet Baker, portrayed by Hawke.

The film has been described as "semi-factual, semi-fictional". Variety's reviewer, Andrew Barker, noted that the film is "about a character who happens to share a name and a significant number of biographical similarities with Chet Baker, taking the legendary West Coast jazz musician's life as though it were merely a chord chart from which to launch an improvised set of new melodies".

== Synopsis ==
Set largely in 1966, Chet Baker is hired to play himself in a movie about his earlier years when he first tried heroin. He romances actress Jane Azuka (a fictional character and a composite of several of Baker's women in real life), but on their first date Baker is attacked by a group of drug dealers he owned money, and his front teeth are smashed. As Baker recovers from his injury, his embouchure is ruined and he is unable to play his trumpet any better than a novice. He starts practicing again, while answering to a probation officer who wants to ensure Baker is employed, and while sticking to his regimen of methadone treatment. When Baker's technique slowly improves, he tries to get his career back on track with the help of Jane and of his friend and Pacific Jazz Records' executive Dick Bock.

== Cast ==
- Ethan Hawke as Chet Baker
- Carmen Ejogo as Jane Azuka/Elaine
- Callum Keith Rennie as Dick (Richard) Bock
- Stephen McHattie as Chesney Baker, Sr.
- Janet-Laine Green as Vera Baker
- Tony Nappo as Officer Reid
- Kevin Hanchard as Dizzy Gillespie
- Dan Lett as Danny Friedman
- Charles Officer as Bowling Alley Thug
- Katie Boland as Sarah
- Janine Theriault as Florence
- Joe Cobden as Actor Dick
- Barbara Eve Harris as Elsie Azuka
- Eugene Clark as Henry Azuka
- Kwasi Songui as M.C.
- Jim Calarco as Bowling Alley Manager
- Kedar Brown as Miles Davis
- Tony Nardi as Nicholas

== Production ==
In October 2014, it was announced that Ethan Hawke had joined the cast portraying the role of Chet Baker, with Robert Budreau directing from a screenplay he wrote. That same month, it was announced that Carmen Ejogo and Callum Keith Rennie had also joined the cast of the film. Filming took place in Sudbury, Ontario, in fall 2014.

The jazz score to the film was created by composer and pianist David Braid. The audio for trumpet performances in the film was done by Kevin Turcotte. Hawke had taken trumpet lessons from Ben Promane, and requested video of Turcotte recording, in order to mime the playing during the shoot.

== Release ==
The film had its world premiere at the Toronto International Film Festival on 13 September 2015. Shortly after, IFC Films acquired American distribution rights to the film. The film had a limited Canadian release on 11 March 2016, and a limited release in the United States two weeks later.

== Critical reception ==
Born to Be Blue received positive reviews from film critics, with Hawke's performance receiving praise. It holds an 88% rating on review aggregator website Rotten Tomatoes, based on 100 reviews, with an average rating of 7/10 and critical consensus being: "Born to Be Blue benefits from a highlight-reel performance from Ethan Hawke and an impressionistic, non-hagiographic approach to Chet Baker's life and times". On Metacritic, the film holds a rating of 64 out of 100, based on 32 critics.

== Soundtrack album ==
Warner Music Canada released a collection of fourteen tracks, with twelve arranged or composed by David Braid and one track each by Charles Mingus and Odetta. Two tracks feature Hawke's vocals.

== See also ==
- My Foolish Heart, another film about the final days of Chet Baker.
- Miles Ahead, a similar film depicting the life of jazz trumpeter Miles Davis.
