= Hamza Haq =

Canadian actor (born 1990)

- Born: October 27, 1990 (age 35); Jeddah, Saudi Arabia
- Citizenship: Canadian
- Education: Carleton University (BA)
- Occupation: Actor

Hamza Haq (born October 27, 1990) is a Canadian actor, best known for his leading role of Bashir Hamed in the medical drama television series Transplant, which earned him three consecutive Canadian Screen Awards (2021, 2022, 2023).

== Early life ==
Hamza Haq was born to Pakistani parents in Jeddah, Saudi Arabia, before immigrating to Canada when he was nine years old, where he became a Canadian citizen. His father worked for an airline while his mother was an organic chemist. He learned English from a school in the Filipino embassy in Saudi Arabia before switching to an American school. He later attended Bell High School in Ottawa, Ontario. Haq graduated from Carleton University with a Bachelor of Arts in film studies with a minor in Law.

== Career ==
Haq started his career with roles on various television series, before taking on roles in feature films. As an actor, his work has included the television series Quantico and limited series The Indian Detective. He was also the host for the children's television series Look Kool.

At the 6th Canadian Screen Awards in 2018, he received a nomination for Best Performance in a Guest Role in a Drama Series for an appearance on This Life, and in 2019 he received the Star award from the Mosaic International South Asian Film Festival.

In 2020, he assumed the lead role in the television series Transplant, and had a supporting role in Philippe Falardeau's film My Salinger Year.

In his year-end review of television in 2020, critic John Doyle of The Globe and Mail named Haq as having given one of the year's best performances in Canadian television. The industry trade magazine Playback also named Haq as Canadian television's breakout star of 2020.

Haq won the award for Best Actor in a Drama Series for Transplant at the 9th Canadian Screen Awards in 2021 and at the 10th Canadian Screen Awards in 2022. In 2023, he won the Canadian Screen Award for Best Lead Performer in Drama Series.

Following the end of Transplant, Haq was announced as playing Tommy Hawley, a man suspected of involvement in a criminal smuggling ring, in the forthcoming Crave crime drama series The Borderline.

== Filmography ==
=== Film ===
Year	Title	Role	Notes
2013	Rulers of Darkness	Heyman	
2014	Girl House	Techie #1	
2017	Bon Cop, Bad Cop 2	Khalid	
2017	The Glass Castle	Intern	Uncredited
2017	Mother!	Refugee	Uncredited
2018	The Death & Life of John F. Donovan	Journalist #2	
2019	Run This Town	Detective Sharma	
2019	Long Shot	MSNBC Anchor	Uncredited
2020	My Salinger Year	Karl	
2021	Crisis	Supermarket Manager	
2022	Delia's Gone	Larry	
2022	Viking	Gary	
2023	The Queen of My Dreams	Hassan	
2023	With Love and a Major Organ	George	

=== Television ===
Year	Title	Role	Notes
2013	A Sister's Revenge	Restaurant Worker	Television film
2014	The Best Laid Plans	Raj	Episode: "Going Brogue"
2014	Being Human	Vampire #1	Episode: "Ramona the Pest"
2014	19-2	Orderly	Episode: "Winter"
2015, 2016	Quantico	Tech / Analyst	2 episodes
2015–2016	The Art of More	Uzay Almasi	14 episodes
2015–2016	Look Kool	Hamza	24 episodes
2015, 2017	At Your Feet	Hamza / Sweet Guy	2 episodes
2016	This Life	Raza Ali	10 episodes
2016	The Perfect Stalker	Amir	Television film
2017	Mistakes Were Made	John	4 episodes
2017	The Bold Type	Trevor	Episode: "The End of the Beginning"
2017	Designated Survivor	Peter Jan	Episode: "Family Ties"
2017	The Indian Detective	Gopal / Amal Chandekar	4 episodes
2018	The Detectives	Al Lalani Jr.	Episode: "Burning Season"
2018	In Contempt	Hakeem	5 episodes
2018	No Escape Room	Tyler	Television film
2019	The 410	Jass	3 episodes
2019	Jett	Fred Mooney	3 episodes
2020–2024	Transplant	Dr. Bashir Hamed	Series lead
2023	Crashing Eid	Sameer	Series lead
2026	The Borderline	Tommy Hawley	
