= That Beautiful Somewhere =

- DVD cover
- Directed by: Robert Budreau
- Screenplay by: Robert Budreau
- Based on: Loon by William Plumstead
- Produced by: Ian Murray; Robert Budreau
- Starring: Roy Dupuis; Jane McGregor; Gordon Tootoosis
- Cinematography: Andrew Watt
- Edited by: Mitch Lackie
- Music by: Steve London
- Distributed by: Equinoxe Films
- Release date: April 2006
- Running time: 93 minutes (Canada)
- Country: Canada
- Language: English

That Beautiful Somewhere is a Canadian feature film written, directed and produced by Robert Budreau, produced by Ian Murray and executive produced by Bill Plumstead and Matthew Stone for Loon Film Inc. and Lumanity Productions. The film stars Roy Dupuis and Jane McGregor. The screenplay was based on the novel Loon, by William (Bill) Plumstead, who was also its executive producer. It was filmed on location in Temagami, Bonfield and North Bay, Ontario in 2005 and completed in 2006. Its world première, attended by Budreau, Dupuis, and Murray, occurred on August 26, 2006, during the Montreal World Film Festival. It was also shown at the Atlantic Film Festival, the Cinéfest Sudbury International Film Festival, the Calgary International Film Festival.

The film was theatrically released across Canada in late April 2007.

== Premise ==
A detective teams up with a young female archaeologist to unravel the mysterious death of a 'bog body' found in a native swamp rumoured to have curative powers. It is the story of two wounded souls searching for healing and redemption.

== Cast ==
- Roy Dupuis as Detective Conk Adams
- Jane McGregor as Catherine Nyland
- Gordon Tootoosis as Harold
- Marc Veilleux as Jake Steed
- Jeremy Ellies as Dr. Kelevra

== Production ==
Part of the film was shot in the École secondaire catholique Algonquin auditorium.
