= An Attempt at Exhausting a Place in Paris =

1975 book by Georges Perec

- Author: Georges Perec
- Original title: Tentative d'épuisement d'un lieu parisien
- Language: French
- Publication date: 1975
- ISBN: 978-0-984-11552-5

An Attempt at Exhausting a Place in Paris, (French: Tentative d'épuisement d'un lieu parisien) is a short (roughly 60 pages) book by Georges Perec written in October 1974 and published in 1975. It is a collection of observations which Perec wrote as he sat in Saint-Sulpice Square in Paris. Rather than describing impressive or notable things such as the architecture, Perec aims to describe all the things that usually pass unnoticed. He charts brief details of buses and people who pass, not worrying about repetition. An Attempt at Exhausting a Place in Paris was first published in the French journal Cause Commune in 1975 and as a small book in 1982 (Marc Lowenthal’s English translation was released in 2010).

== Reception ==
HTMLGIANT's Lily Hoang reviewed it favorably stating "Georges Perec is charming, the most charming man I will never meet, and An Attempt is yet another charming example of his charm."

== Legacy ==
The 2018 novel Écoute by Boris Razon is a fictional version of An Attempt at Exhausting a Place in Paris.

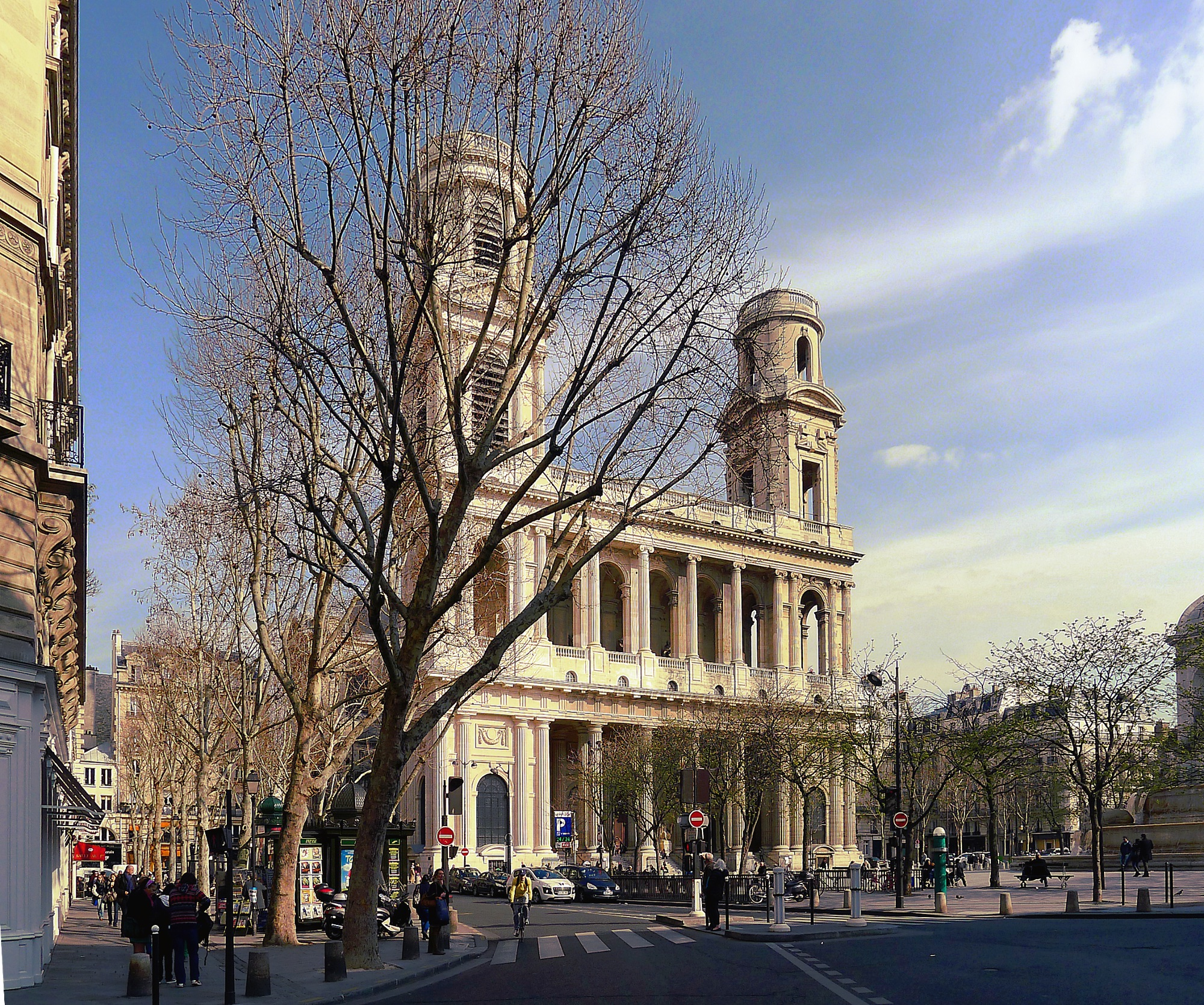
Saint-Sulpice square, the setting for the book
