= The Borderline (Canadian TV series) =

Canadian crime drama television series

- Genre: Crime drama
- Created by: Graeme Stewart
- Written by: Graeme Stewart; Aaron Martin; Jennifer Kassabian; Andrew Wreggitt; Adriana Maggs; Thomas Pepper
- Directed by: Robert Budreau
- Starring: Stephen Amell; Hamza Haq; Minnie Driver
- Country of origin: Canada
- Original language: English
- No. of series: 1
- No. of episodes: 6

Production
- Executive producers: Graeme Stewart; Stephen Amell; Robert Budreau; Scott Garvie; Christina Jennings; Aaron Martin
- Producers: Patrick Cassavetti; Paige Haight; Shauna Jamison
- Production company: Shaftesbury Films

Original release
- Network: CTV; Crave
- Release: February 8, 2026 – present

The Borderline also known The Murder Line in certain regions, is a Canadian crime drama television series, which premiered in February 8, 2026. The show stars Stephen Amell as Henry Roland, a smalltown police officer in the Thousand Islands region of Ontario, alongside a cast which includes Minnie Driver and Hamza Haq.

Despite being promoted as a miniseries, the series' future is undecided.

== Premise ==
A smalltown police officer in Ontario discovers that his childhood friend Tommy Hawley is connected to an international drug smuggling operation led by British crime boss May Ferguson.

== Cast ==
- Stephen Amell as Henry Roland
- Hamza Haq as Tommy Hawley
- Minnie Driver as May Ferguson
- Tamara Podemski as Erica Ross
- Thomas Craig as Gaz
- Jeremy Watson as Miles King
- Jorja Cadence as Stacey
- Katia Edith Wood as Ruby

== Production ==
The series was first announced by Shaftesbury Films in 2024, with the working title Underbelly. The series was created by Graeme Stewart and directed by Robert Budreau, with writers including Stewart, Aaron Martin, Jennifer Kassabian, Andrew Wreggitt, Adriana Maggs and Thomas Pepper.

The cast is led by Stephen Amell, Minnie Driver and Hamza Haq. The supporting cast also includes Tamara Podemski, Katia Wood, Thomas Craig, Kate Corbett, Christopher Heyerdahl and Diego Klattenhoff.

Filming took place in Toronto, Gananoque and the Thousand Islands region of Ontario between 2 October 2024 and 22 November 2024.

== Episodes ==
No.	Title	Directed by	Written by	Original release date
1	"Blue Beetle"	Robert Budreau	Graeme Stewart	February 8, 2026
2	"Strange River"	Robert Budreau	Story by : Aaron Martin; Teleplay by : Graeme Stewart	February 13, 2026
3	"No Loose Ends"	Robert Budreau	Jennifer Kassabian	February 20, 2026
4	"No Room at the No Tell Motel"	Robert Budreau	Story by : Thomas Pepper & Adriana Maggs; Teleplay by : Adriana Maggs	February 27, 2026
5	"Bones"	Robert Budreau	Andrew Wreggitt	March 6, 2026
6	"Long Time Running"	Robert Budreau	Graeme Stewart	March 13, 2026

== Broadcast ==
The series premiered February 8, 2026, in a dual broadcast on both CTV and Crave as the lead-out program to CTV's broadcast of Super Bowl LX, with subsequent episodes airing on Crave, beginning February 13. The series has been released in the United Kingdom on ITVX from 18 April 2026 under the title The Murder Line.
