= List of accolades received by Emilia Pérez =

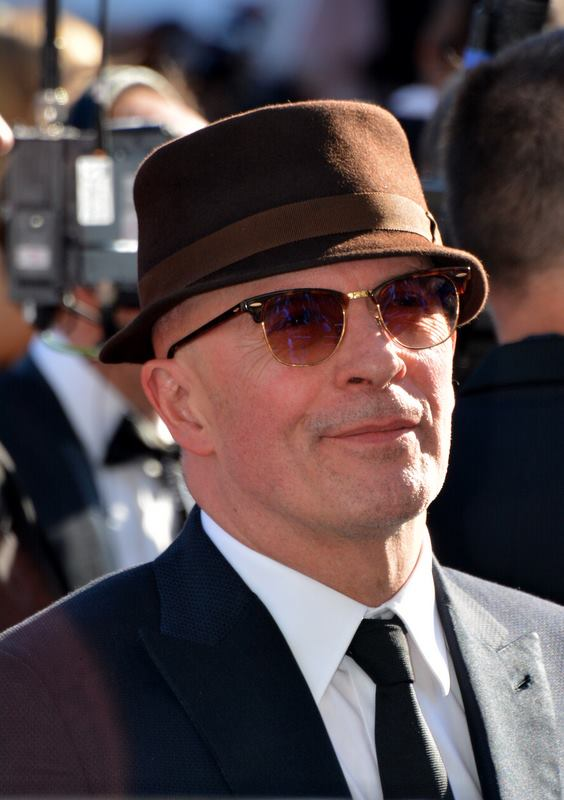
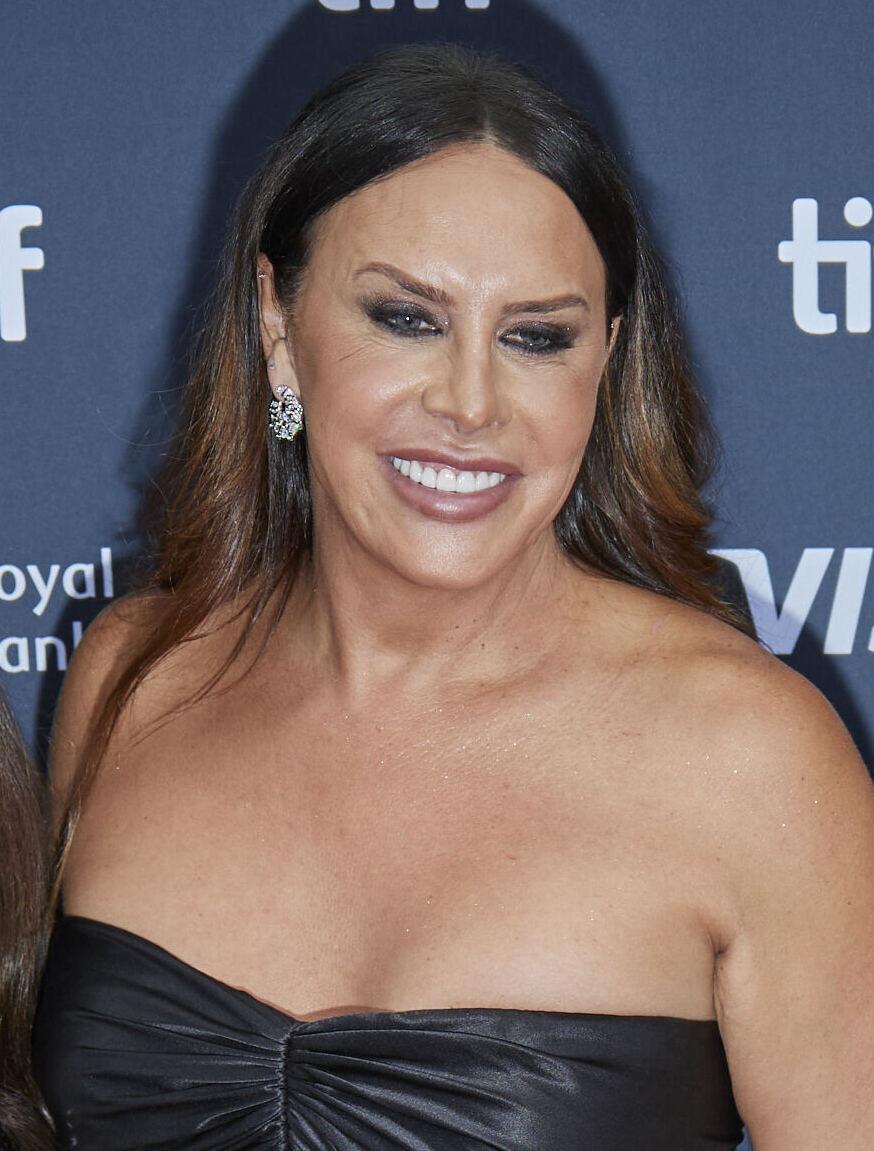
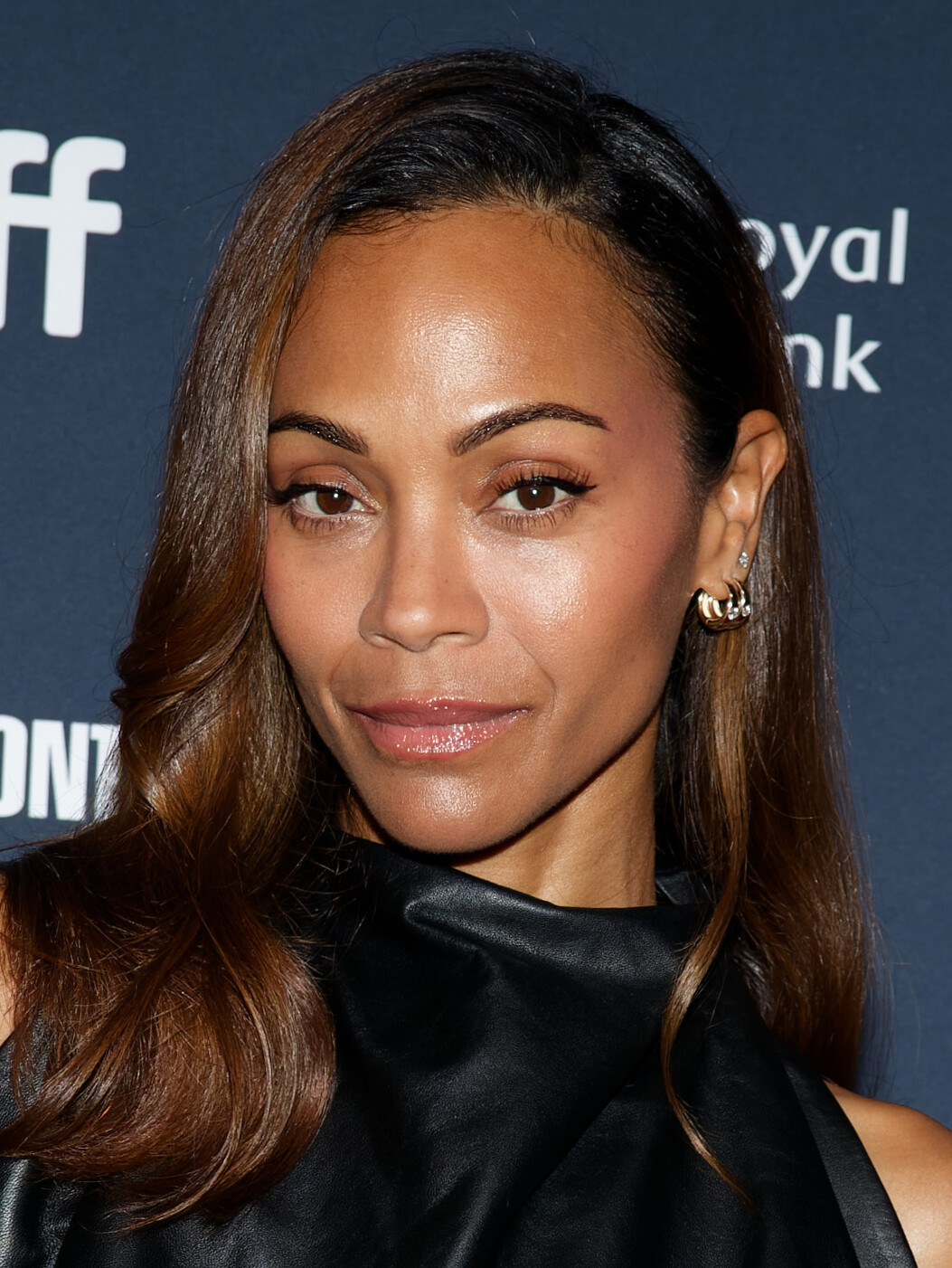
- Jacques Audiard (left) received critical acclaim for his screenplay and direction, as did Karla Sofía Gascón (middle) and Zoe Saldaña (right) for their performances.
Awards and nominations
Award	Wins	Nominations

Totals (Note: Certain award groups do not simply award one winner. They acknowledge several different recipients, have runners-up, and have third place. Since this is a specific recognition and is different from losing an award, runner-up mentions are considered wins in this award tally. For simplification and to avoid errors, each award in this list has been presumed to have had a prior nomination.)
- Wins: 132
- Nominations: 277

Numerous critical and industry groups have acclaimed Emilia Pérez, a 2024 French musical crime film in Spanish, written and directed by Jacques Audiard, who producted it along with Pascal Caucheteux, Valérie Schermann, and Anthony Vaccarello. The film garnered many awards and nominations in various categories with particular recognition for its directing, writing, producing, acting, songs, and editing.

At the 2024 Cannes Film Festival, stars Karla Sofía Gascón, Selena Gomez, Adriana Paz, and Zoe Saldaña collectively won the Best Actress award, while director Audiard won the Jury Prize and Clément Ducol and Camille won the Soundtrack Award. The film was also nominated for the Palme d'Or and the Queer Palm. It was named one of the Top 10 Films of 2024 by the American Film Institute.

At the 97th Academy Awards, Emilia Pérez received a leading 13 nominations, including Best Picture, Best Director for Audiard, Best Actress for Gascón, who is the first openly trans woman to be nominated in the category, and Best Supporting Actress for Saldaña. At the 82nd Golden Globe Awards, Emilia Pérez won four awards, including Best Motion Picture – Musical or Comedy and Best Foreign Language Film, from 10 nominations. Emilia Pérez is also the most-nominated non-English-language film at both ceremonies.

Emilia Pérez received 11 nominations at the 78th British Academy Film Awards, including Best Film, Best Director, Best Actress in a Leading Role for Gascón, and Best Actress in a Supporting Role for both Gomez and Saldaña. The film received three nominations at the 31st Screen Actors Guild Awards: Outstanding Performance by a Cast in a Motion Picture for Gascón, Gomez, Paz, and Saldaña, Outstanding Performance by a Female Actor in a Leading Role for Gascón, and Outstanding Performance by a Female Actor in a Supporting Role for Saldaña.

Emilia Pérez received 13 nominations at the 50th César Awards, including Best Film, Best Director, and Best Actress for both Gascón and Saldaña. At the 30th Critics' Choice Awards, the film received 10 nominations, including Best Picture, Best Director, Best Actress for Gascón, Best Supporting Actress for Saldaña, and Best Acting Ensemble. The film also won five European Film Awards, including Best Film, Best Director, and Best Actress for Gascón.

== Accolades ==
Award	Date of ceremony	Category	Recipient(s)	Result	Ref.
AACTA International Awards	7 February 2025	Best Film	Emilia Pérez	Nominated	
AACTA International Awards	7 February 2025	Best Direction	Jacques Audiard	Nominated	
AACTA International Awards	7 February 2025	Best Actress	Karla Sofía Gascón	Nominated	
AACTA International Awards	7 February 2025	Best Supporting Actress	Zoe Saldaña	Won	
AARP Movies for Grownups Awards	8 February 2025	Best Picture/Best Movie for Grownups	Emilia Pérez	Nominated	
AARP Movies for Grownups Awards	8 February 2025	Best Director	Jacques Audiard	Won	
AARP Movies for Grownups Awards	8 February 2025	Best Screenwriter	Jacques Audiard, Thomas Bidegain, Nicolas Livecchi	Nominated	
Academy Awards	2 March 2025	Best Picture	Jacques Audiard and Pascal Caucheteux	Nominated	
Academy Awards	2 March 2025	Best International Feature Film	Emilia Pérez	Nominated	
Academy Awards	2 March 2025	Best Director	Jacques Audiard	Nominated	
Academy Awards	2 March 2025	Best Actress	Karla Sofía Gascón	Nominated	
Academy Awards	2 March 2025	Best Supporting Actress	Zoe Saldaña	Won	
Academy Awards	2 March 2025	Best Adapted Screenplay	Jacques Audiard; in collaboration with Thomas Bidegain, Léa Mysius and Nicolas Livecchi	Nominated	
Academy Awards	2 March 2025	Best Film Editing	Juliette Welfling	Nominated	
Academy Awards	2 March 2025	Best Sound	Erwan Kerzanet, Aymeric Devoldère, Maxence Dussère, Cyril Holtz and Niels Barletta	Nominated	
Academy Awards	2 March 2025	Best Cinematography	Paul Guilhaume	Nominated	
Academy Awards	2 March 2025	Best Makeup and Hairstyling	Julia Floch Carbonel, Emmanuel Janvier and Jean-Christophe Spadaccini	Nominated	
Academy Awards	2 March 2025	Best Original Score	Clément Ducol and Camille	Nominated	
Academy Awards	2 March 2025	Best Original Song	"El Mal" (Music by Clément Ducol and Camille; lyric by Clément Ducol, Camille and Jacques Audiard)	Won	
Academy Awards	2 March 2025	Best Original Song	"Mi Camino" (Music and lyrics by Camille and Clément Ducol)	Nominated	
Actors and Actresses Union Awards	10 March 2025	Best Female Performance in an International Production	Karla Sofía Gascón	Won	
ADG Excellence in Production Design Awards	15 February 2025	Excellence in Production Design for a Contemporary Film	Emmanuelle Duplay	Nominated	
African-American Film Critics Association Awards	19 February 2025	Top 10 Films of the Year	Emilia Pérez	6th Place	
African-American Film Critics Association Awards	19 February 2025	Best International Film	Emilia Pérez	Won	
Alliance of Women Film Journalists EDA Awards	7 January 2025	Best Film	Emilia Pérez	Nominated	
Alliance of Women Film Journalists EDA Awards	7 January 2025	Best Director	Jacques Audiard	Nominated	
Alliance of Women Film Journalists EDA Awards	7 January 2025	Best Actress	Karla Sofía Gascón	Nominated	
Alliance of Women Film Journalists EDA Awards	7 January 2025	Best Actress in a Supporting Role	Zoe Saldaña	Nominated	
Alliance of Women Film Journalists EDA Awards	7 January 2025	Best Screenplay, Adapted	Jacques Audiard, Thomas Bidegain and Léa Mysius	Nominated	
Alliance of Women Film Journalists EDA Awards	7 January 2025	Best Ensemble Cast and Casting Director	Emilia Pérez	Nominated	
Alliance of Women Film Journalists EDA Awards	7 January 2025	Best Editing	Emilia Pérez	Won (Note: Tied with The Brutalist.)	
Alliance of Women Film Journalists EDA Awards	7 January 2025	Best International Film	Emilia Pérez	Nominated	
Alliance of Women Film Journalists EDA Awards	7 January 2025	EDA Female Focus – Best Women's Breakthrough Performance	Karla Sofía Gascón	Nominated	
American Cinema Editors Eddie Awards	14 March 2025	Best Edited Feature Film (Drama, Theatrical)	Juliette Welfling	Won	
American Cinematheque	9 January 2025	Achievement in Choreography	Damien Jalet	Won	
American Cinematheque	9 January 2025	Achievement in Editing	Juliette Welfling	Won	
American Film Institute Awards	10 January 2025	Top 10 Films	Emilia Pérez	Won (Note: This award does not have a single winner, but recognizes multiple films.)	
Artios Awards	12 February 2025	Outstanding Achievement in Casting – International Feature	Carla Hool, Susan Putnam	Won	
Astra Film and Creative Arts Awards	8 December 2024	Best Picture	Emilia Pérez	Nominated	
Astra Film and Creative Arts Awards	8 December 2024	Best Actress	Karla Sofía Gascón	Nominated	
Astra Film and Creative Arts Awards	8 December 2024	Best Supporting Actress	Selena Gomez	Nominated	
Astra Film and Creative Arts Awards	8 December 2024	Best Supporting Actress	Zoe Saldaña	Won (Note: Tied with Ariana Grande for Wicked.)	
Astra Film and Creative Arts Awards	8 December 2024	Best Director	Jacques Audiard	Nominated	
Astra Film and Creative Arts Awards	8 December 2024	Best Cast Ensemble	Emilia Pérez	Nominated	
Astra Film and Creative Arts Awards	8 December 2024	Best International Feature	Emilia Pérez	Won	
Astra Film and Creative Arts Awards	8 December 2024	Game Changer Award	Karla Sofía Gascón	Won	
Astra Film and Creative Arts Awards	8 December 2024	Best Casting	Christel Baras and Carla Hool	Nominated	
Astra Film and Creative Arts Awards	8 December 2024	Best Original Score	Clément Ducol and Camille	Won	
Astra Film and Creative Arts Awards	8 December 2024	Best Original Song	Camille, Clément Ducol, Jacques Audiard, Karla Sofía Gascón and Zoe Saldaña ("El Mal")	Nominated	
Astra Film and Creative Arts Awards	8 December 2024	Best Original Song	Camille, Clément Ducol and Selena Gomez ("Mi Camino")	Won	
Austin Film Critics Association	6 January 2025	Best International Film	Emilia Pérez	Nominated	
Australian Effects & Animation Festival	31 July 2025	Feature Film Sequence	MPC Paris (El Alegato in the streets of Mexico City)	Nominated	
Belgian Film Critics Association	4 January 2025	Grand Prix	Emilia Pérez	Nominated	
Black Reel Awards	17 February 2025	Outstanding Supporting Performance	Zoe Saldaña	Nominated	
Black Reel Awards	17 February 2025	Outstanding Foreign Film	Emilia Pérez	Nominated	
Black Reel Awards	17 February 2025	Outstanding Original Song	"El Mal" (Clément Ducol, Camille, and Jacques Audiard, songwriters; Zoe Saldaña, Karla Sofía Gascón, and Camille, performers)	Nominated	
British Academy Film Awards	16 February 2025	Best Film	Emilia Pérez	Nominated	
British Academy Film Awards	16 February 2025	Best Director	Jacques Audiard	Nominated	
British Academy Film Awards	16 February 2025	Best Actress in a Leading Role	Karla Sofía Gascón	Nominated	
British Academy Film Awards	16 February 2025	Best Actress in a Supporting Role	Selena Gomez	Nominated	
British Academy Film Awards	16 February 2025	Best Actress in a Supporting Role	Zoe Saldaña	Won	
British Academy Film Awards	16 February 2025	Best Adapted Screenplay	Jacques Audiard	Nominated	
British Academy Film Awards	16 February 2025	Best Film Not in the English Language	Emilia Pérez	Won	
British Academy Film Awards	16 February 2025	Best Cinematography	Paul Guilhaume	Nominated	
British Academy Film Awards	16 February 2025	Best Editing	Juliette Welfling	Nominated	
British Academy Film Awards	16 February 2025	Best Makeup and Hair	Julia Floch Carbonel, Emmanuel Janvier, Jean-Christophe Spadaccini, and Romain Marietti	Nominated	
British Academy Film Awards	16 February 2025	Best Original Score	Camille and Clément Ducol	Nominated	
British Society of Cinematographers Awards	1 February 2025	Best Cinematography in a Theatrical Feature Film	Paul Guilhaume	Nominated	
Camerimage	23 November 2024	Golden Frog	Paul Guilhaume	Nominated	
Camerimage	23 November 2024	Bronze Frog	Paul Guilhaume	Won	
Cannes Film Festival	25 May 2024	Palme d'Or	Jacques Audiard	Nominated	
Cannes Film Festival	25 May 2024	Jury Prize	Jacques Audiard	Won	
Cannes Film Festival	25 May 2024	Best Actress	Karla Sofía Gascón, Selena Gomez, Adriana Paz and Zoe Saldaña	Won	
Cannes Film Festival	25 May 2024	Queer Palm	Jacques Audiard	Nominated	
Cannes Film Festival	25 May 2024	Soundtrack Award	Clément Ducol and Camille	Won	
Capri Hollywood International Film Festival	2 January 2025	Best Picture	Emilia Pérez	Won	
Capri Hollywood International Film Festival	2 January 2025	Best Actress	Karla Sofía Gascón	Won	
Capri Hollywood International Film Festival	2 January 2025	Best Adapted Screenplay	Jacques Audiard, Thomas Bidegain, Nicolas Livecchi	Won	
Capri Hollywood International Film Festival	2 January 2025	Best Makeup and Hairstyling	Julia Floch-Carbonel, Simon Livet and Romain Marietti	Won	
Capri Hollywood International Film Festival	2 January 2025	Best Ensemble Cast	Karla Sofía Gascón, Zoe Saldaña, Selena Gomez and Adriana Paz	Won	
Capri Hollywood International Film Festival	2 January 2025	Capri Producers of The Year Award	Jacques Audiard, Pascal Caucheteux, Valérie Schermann and Anthony Vaccarello	Won	
Capri Hollywood International Film Festival	2 January 2025	Capri European Director of the Year	Jacques Audiard	Won	
Celebration of Cinema and Television	22 October 2024	Groundbreaker Award	Zoe Saldaña	Won	
César Awards	28 February 2025	Best Film	Produced by Jacques Audiard, Pascal Caucheteux, Valérie Schermann and Anthony Vaccarello; directed by Jacques Audiard	Won	
César Awards	28 February 2025	Best Director	Jacques Audiard	Won	
César Awards	28 February 2025	Best Actress	Karla Sofía Gascón	Nominated	
César Awards	28 February 2025	Best Actress	Zoe Saldaña	Nominated	
César Awards	28 February 2025	Best Adaptation	Jacques Audiard with Thomas Bidegain, Léa Mysius and Nicolas Livecchi	Won	
César Awards	28 February 2025	Best Cinematography	Paul Guilhaume	Won	
César Awards	28 February 2025	Best Editing	Juliette Welfling	Nominated	
César Awards	28 February 2025	Best Sound	Erwan Kerzanet, Aymeric Devoldère, Cyril Holtz and Niels Barletta	Won	
César Awards	28 February 2025	Best Original Music	Clément Ducol and Camille	Won	
César Awards	28 February 2025	Best Costume Design	Virginie Montel	Nominated	
César Awards	28 February 2025	Best Production Design	Emmanuelle Duplay	Nominated	
César Awards	28 February 2025	Best Visual Effects	Cédric Fayolle	Won	
Chicago Film Critics Association Awards	12 December 2024	Best Supporting Actress	Zoe Saldaña	Nominated	
Chicago Film Critics Association Awards	12 December 2024	Best Foreign Language Film	Emilia Pérez	Nominated	
Chicago Film Critics Association Awards	12 December 2024	Most Promising Performer	Karla Sofía Gascón	Nominated	
Chita Rivera Awards for Dance and Choreography	19 May 2025	Outstanding Choreography in a Feature Film	Damien Jalet	Nominated	
Costume Designers Guild Awards	6 February 2025	Excellence in Contemporary Film	Virginie Montel	Nominated	
Critics' Choice Movie Awards	7 February 2025	Best Picture	Emilia Pérez	Nominated	
Critics' Choice Movie Awards	7 February 2025	Best Director	Jacques Audiard	Nominated	
Critics' Choice Movie Awards	7 February 2025	Best Actress	Karla Sofía Gascón	Nominated	
Critics' Choice Movie Awards	7 February 2025	Best Supporting Actress	Zoe Saldaña	Won	
Critics' Choice Movie Awards	7 February 2025	Best Acting Ensemble	Emilia Pérez	Nominated	
Critics' Choice Movie Awards	7 February 2025	Best Adapted Screenplay	Jacques Audiard	Nominated	
Critics' Choice Movie Awards	7 February 2025	Foreign Language Film	Emilia Pérez	Won	
Critics' Choice Movie Awards	7 February 2025	Best Score	Camille and Clément Ducol	Nominated	
Critics' Choice Movie Awards	7 February 2025	Best Song	"El Mal" (Clément Ducol, Camille, and Jacques Audiard, songwriters; Zoe Saldaña, Karla Sofía Gascón, and Camille, performers)	Won	
Critics' Choice Movie Awards	7 February 2025	Best Song	"Mi Camino" (Clément Ducol and Camille, songwriters; Selena Gomez, performer)	Nominated	
Dallas–Fort Worth Film Critics Association Awards	18 December 2024	Best Foreign Language Film	Emilia Pérez	Runner-up	
Dallas–Fort Worth Film Critics Association Awards	18 December 2024	Best Actress	Karla Sofía Gascón	3rd Place	
Dallas–Fort Worth Film Critics Association Awards	18 December 2024	Best Supporting Actress	Zoe Saldaña	Won	
Denver Film Festival	10 November 2024	Rare Pearl Award	Jacques Audiard	Won	
Directors Guild of America Awards	8 February 2025	Outstanding Directorial Achievement in Motion Pictures	Jacques Audiard	Nominated	
Dorian Awards	13 February 2025	LGBTQ Film of the Year	Emilia Pérez	Nominated	
Dorian Awards	13 February 2025	Non-English Language Film of the Year	Emilia Pérez	Nominated	
Dorian Awards	13 February 2025	LGBTQ Non-English Film of the Year	Emilia Pérez	Won	
Dorian Awards	13 February 2025	Film Music of the Year	Emilia Pérez	Nominated	
Dorian Awards	13 February 2025	Film Performance of the Year	Karla Sofía Gascón	Nominated	
Dorian Awards	13 February 2025	Supporting Film Performance of the Year	Zoe Saldaña	Nominated	
Dublin Film Critics' Circle Awards	19 December 2024	Best Film	Emilia Pérez	6th Place	
Dublin Film Critics' Circle Awards	19 December 2024	Best Actress	Karla Sofía Gascón	3rd Place	
European Film Awards	7 December 2024	European Film	Emilia Pérez	Won	
European Film Awards	7 December 2024	European Director	Jacques Audiard	Won	
European Film Awards	7 December 2024	European Screenwriter	Jacques Audiard	Won	
European Film Awards	7 December 2024	European Actress	Karla Sofía Gascón	Won	
European Film Awards	7 December 2024	European Editor	Juliette Welfling	Won	
Film Critics Circle of Australia Awards	11 February 2026	The David Stratton Award for International Film	Jacques Audiard	Won	
Florida Film Critics Circle	20 December 2024	Best Supporting Actress	Zoe Saldaña	Won	
Florida Film Critics Circle	20 December 2024	Best International Film	Emilia Pérez	Nominated	
French Society of Cinematographers Awards	4 February 2025	Best Cinematography for a Feature Film	Paul Guilhaume	Won	
French Syndicate of Cinema Critics Awards	10 February 2025	Best French Film	Emilia Pérez	Won	
Georgia Film Critics Association Awards	7 January 2025	Best Supporting Actress	Zoe Saldaña	Nominated	
Georgia Film Critics Association Awards	7 January 2025	Best Original Song	Camille, Clément Ducol and Jacques Audiard ("El Mal")	Nominated	
Glamour Spain Women of the Year Awards	27 November 2024	International Actress	Karla Sofía Gascón	Won	
Golden Globe Awards	5 January 2025	Best Motion Picture – Musical or Comedy	Emilia Pérez	Won	
Golden Globe Awards	5 January 2025	Best Motion Picture – Non-English Language	Emilia Pérez	Won	
Golden Globe Awards	5 January 2025	Best Actress – Motion Picture Musical or Comedy	Karla Sofía Gascón	Nominated	
Golden Globe Awards	5 January 2025	Best Supporting Actress – Motion Picture	Selena Gomez	Nominated	
Golden Globe Awards	5 January 2025	Best Supporting Actress – Motion Picture	Zoe Saldaña	Won	
Golden Globe Awards	5 January 2025	Best Director	Jacques Audiard	Nominated	
Golden Globe Awards	5 January 2025	Best Screenplay	Jacques Audiard	Nominated	
Golden Globe Awards	5 January 2025	Best Original Score	Camille and Clément Ducol	Nominated	
Golden Globe Awards	5 January 2025	Best Original Song	Camille, Clément Ducol and Jacques Audiard ("El Mal")	Won	
Golden Globe Awards	5 January 2025	Best Original Song	Camille and Clément Ducol ("Mi Camino")	Nominated	
Golden Reel Awards	23 February 2025	Outstanding Achievement in Sound Editing – Foreign Language Feature	Aymeric Devoldère, Cyril Holtz, Hortense Bailly, Carolina Santana, Antoine Swertvaegher and Gregory Vincent	Won	
Golden Reel Awards	23 February 2025	Outstanding Achievement in Music Editing – Feature Motion Picture	Maxence Dussère, Cécile Coutelier, Matthieu Lefèvre and Aristide Rosier	Nominated	
Golden Trailer Awards	29 May 2025	Best Foreign Music	Emilia Pérez	Won	
Golden Trailer Awards	29 May 2025	Best Foreign TV Spot	Emilia Pérez	Nominated	
Golden Trailer Awards	29 May 2025	Best BTS/EPK for a Feature Film (Over 2 minutes)	Emilia Pérez	Nominated	
Goya Awards	8 February 2025	Best European Film	Emilia Pérez	Won	
Guild of Music Supervisors Awards	23 February 2025	Best Music Supervision in Mid-Level Budget Films	Pierre-Marie Dru	Nominated	
Hamilton Behind the Camera Awards	14 November 2024	Hair and Makeup	Julia Floch-Carbonel, Simon Livet and Romain Marietti	Won	
Heat Latin Music Awards	29 May 2025	Best Song for Videogames, Series or Movies	Selena Gomez ("Mi Camino")	Nominated	
Hochi Film Awards	December 2, 2025	Best International Film	Jacques Audiard	Won	
Hollywood Music in Media Awards	20 November 2024	Best Original Song – Feature Film	Camille, Clément Ducol, Jacques Audiard and Zoe Saldaña ("El Mal")	Nominated	
Hollywood Music in Media Awards	20 November 2024	Best Original Song – Feature Film	Camille, Clément Ducol, Édgar Ramírez and Selena Gomez ("Mi Camino")	Nominated	
Hollywood Music in Media Awards	20 November 2024	Song – Onscreen Performance (Film)	Zoe Saldaña ("El Mal")	Won	
Hollywood Music in Media Awards	20 November 2024	Original Score – Feature Film	Camille and Clément Ducol	Won	
Hollywood Music in Media Awards	20 November 2024	Music Themed Film, Biopic or Musical	Jacques Audiard, Pascal Caucheteux, Valérie Schermann and Anthony Vaccarell	Won	
Houston Film Critics Society	14 January 2025	Best Foreign Language Feature	Emilia Pérez	Won	
Houston Film Critics Society	14 January 2025	Best Supporting Actress	Zoe Saldaña	Won	
Houston Film Critics Society	14 January 2025	Best Original Score	Clément Ducol	Nominated	
Houston Film Critics Society	14 January 2025	Best Original Song	Camille, Clément Ducol and Jacques Audiard ("El Mal")	Nominated	
ICG Publicists Awards	28 February 2025	Maxwell Weinberg Award for Motion Picture Publicity Campaign	Emilia Pérez	Nominated	
iHeartRadio Music Awards	17 March 2025	Favorite Soundtrack	Emilia Pérez	Nominated	
IndieWire Critics Poll	16 December 2024	Best Director	Jacques Audiard	8th Place	
IndieWire Critics Poll	16 December 2024	Best International Film	Emilia Pérez	9th Place	
IndieWire Honors	5 December 2024	Spotlight Award	Selena Gomez	Won	
Ischia Global Film & Music Festival	14 July 2024	Ischia Global Breakout Actress of the Year Award	Karla Sofía Gascón	Won	
Kansas City Film Critics Circle	4 January 2025	Best Actress	Karla Sofía Gascón	Nominated	
Kansas City Film Critics Circle	4 January 2025	Best Supporting Actress	Zoe Saldaña	Nominated	
Kansas City Film Critics Circle	4 January 2025	Best Foreign Language Film	Emilia Pérez	Runner-up	
Kansas City Film Critics Circle	4 January 2025	Tom Poe Award for Best LGBTQ Film	Emilia Pérez	Runner-up	
Las Vegas Film Critics Society Sierra Awards	13 December 2024	Best Actress	Karla Sofía Gascón	Nominated	
Las Vegas Film Critics Society Sierra Awards	13 December 2024	Best Supporting Actress	Zoe Saldaña	Won	
Las Vegas Film Critics Society Sierra Awards	13 December 2024	Best Song	Camille, Clément Ducol and Jacques Audiard ("El Mal")	Nominated	
Las Vegas Film Critics Society Sierra Awards	13 December 2024	Best Song	Camille and Clément Ducol ("Mi Camino")	Nominated	
Las Vegas Film Critics Society Sierra Awards	13 December 2024	Best International	Emilia Pérez	Nominated	
Las Vegas Film Critics Society Sierra Awards	13 December 2024	Best Ensemble	Emilia Pérez	Nominated	
London Film Critics' Circle Awards	2 February 2025	Film of the Year	Emilia Pérez	Nominated	
London Film Critics' Circle Awards	2 February 2025	Foreign Language Film of the Year	Emilia Pérez	Nominated	
London Film Critics' Circle Awards	2 February 2025	Supporting Actress of the Year	Zoe Saldaña	Won	
London Film Critics' Circle Awards	2 February 2025	Breakthrough Performance of the Year	Karla Sofía Gascón	Nominated	
London Film Critics' Circle Awards	2 February 2025	Technical Achievement Award	Clément Ducol, Camille	Nominated	
Lumière Awards	20 January 2025	Best Film	Emilia Pérez	Won	
Lumière Awards	20 January 2025	Best Director	Jacques Audiard	Won	
Lumière Awards	20 January 2025	Best Actress	Karla Sofía Gascón	Won	
Lumière Awards	20 January 2025	Best Screenplay	Jacques Audiard	Won	
Lumière Awards	20 January 2025	Best Cinematography	Paul Guilhaume	Nominated	
Lumière Awards	20 January 2025	Best Music	Camille and Clément Ducol	Won	
Make-Up Artists and Hair Stylists Guild Awards	15 February 2025	Best Contemporary Make-Up	Julia Floch Carbonel and Simon Livet	Nominated	
Middleburg Film Festival	20 October 2024	Spotlight Actor Award	Zoe Saldaña	Won	
Middleburg Film Festival	20 October 2024	Special Achievement in Music Award	Camille and Clément Ducol	Won	
Mill Valley Film Festival	16 October 2024	Outstanding Ensemble Performance	Karla Sofía Gascón, Selena Gomez, Adriana Paz and Zoe Saldaña	Won	
Mill Valley Film Festival	16 October 2024	Audience Favorite ¡Viva el cine!	Emilia Pérez	Won	
NAACP Image Awards	22 February 2025	Outstanding International Motion Picture	Emilia Pérez	Won	
New Orleans Film Festival	22 October 2024	Narrative Feature	Emilia Pérez	Nominated	
New York Film Critics Online Awards	16 December 2024	Best Picture	Emilia Pérez	Nominated	
New York Film Critics Online Awards	16 December 2024	Best Director	Jacques Audiard	Nominated	
New York Film Critics Online Awards	16 December 2024	Best Actress	Karla Sofía Gascón	Nominated	
New York Film Critics Online Awards	16 December 2024	Best Supporting Actress	Zoe Saldaña	Nominated	
New York Film Critics Online Awards	16 December 2024	Best Ensemble	Emilia Pérez	Nominated	
New York Film Critics Online Awards	16 December 2024	Best International Feature	Emilia Pérez	Nominated	
Online Film Critics Society	27 January 2025	Best Supporting Actress	Zoe Saldaña	Nominated	
Online Film Critics Society	27 January 2025	Best Foreign Language Film	Emilia Pérez	Nominated	
Palm Springs International Film Festival	12 January 2025	Vanguard Award	Jacques Audiard, Karla Sofía Gascón, Selena Gomez, Édgar Ramírez and Zoe Saldaña	Won	
Palm Springs International Film Festival	12 January 2025	FIPRESCI Best International Film	Emilia Pérez	Nominated	
Palm Springs International Film Festival	12 January 2025	FIPRESCI Best Actress in an International Feature Film	Zoe Saldaña	Won	
Paris Film Critics Association Awards	9 March 2025	Best Picture	Jacques Audiard	Won	
Paris Film Critics Association Awards	9 March 2025	Best Director	Jacques Audiard	Nominated	
Paris Film Critics Association Awards	9 March 2025	Best Actress	Karla Sofía Gascón	Nominated	
Paris Film Critics Association Awards	9 March 2025	Best Supporting Actress	Zoe Saldaña	Won	
Paris Film Critics Association Awards	9 March 2025	Best Adapted Screenplay	Jacques Audiard, Thomas Bidegain, Léa Mysius and Nicolas Livecchi	Nominated	
Paris Film Critics Association Awards	9 March 2025	Best Cinematography	Paul Guilhaume	Nominated	
Paris Film Critics Association Awards	9 March 2025	Best Film Editing	Juliette Welfling	Won	
Paris Film Critics Association Awards	9 March 2025	Best Original Score	Clément Ducol and Camille	Won	
Paris Film Critics Association Awards	9 March 2025	Best Production Design	Emmanuelle Duplay	Nominated	
Paris Film Critics Association Awards	9 March 2025	Best Costume Design	Virginie Montel	Nominated	
Phoenix Film Critics Society Awards	16 December 2024	Best Foreign Language Film	Emilia Pérez	Won	
Phoenix Film Critics Society Awards	16 December 2024	Best Original Song	Camille, Clément Ducol and Jacques Audiard ("El Mal")	Won	
Polish Film Awards	10 March 2025	Best European Film	Jacques Audiard	Nominated	
Producers Guild of America Awards	8 February 2025	Best Theatrical Motion Picture	Emilia Pérez	Nominated	
Robert Awards	31 January 2026	Best Non-English Language Film	Jacques Audiard	Nominated	
San Francisco Bay Area Film Critics Circle Awards	15 December 2024	Best Actress	Karla Sofía Gascón	Nominated	
San Francisco Bay Area Film Critics Circle Awards	15 December 2024	Best Supporting Actress	Zoe Saldaña	Nominated	
San Francisco Bay Area Film Critics Circle Awards	15 December 2024	Best Foreign Language Film	Emilia Pérez	Nominated	
San Francisco Bay Area Film Critics Circle Awards	15 December 2024	Best Adapted Screenplay	Jacques Audiard	Nominated	
San Francisco Bay Area Film Critics Circle Awards	15 December 2024	Best Original Score	Clément Ducol, Camille	Nominated	
San Sebastian International Film Festival	28 September 2024	Sebastiane Award	Emilia Pérez	Nominated	
San Sebastian International Film Festival	28 September 2024	Audience Award	Emilia Pérez	Nominated	
Santa Barbara International Film Festival	15 February 2025	American Riviera Award	Zoe Saldaña	Won	
Santa Barbara International Film Festival	15 February 2025	Virtuoso Award	Karla Sofía Gascón	Won	
Santa Barbara International Film Festival	15 February 2025	Virtuoso Award	Selena Gomez	Won	
Santa Barbara International Film Festival	15 February 2025	Variety Artisans Award	Camille and Clément Ducol	Won	
Santa Barbara International Film Festival	15 February 2025	Outstanding Directors of the Year	Jacques Audiard	Won	
Sant Jordi Awards	29 April 2025	Best Foreign Film	Emilia Pérez	Won	
Satellite Awards	26 January 2025	Best Actress in Motion Picture – Comedy or Musical	Karla Sofía Gascón	Nominated	
Satellite Awards	26 January 2025	Best Supporting Actress – Motion Picture	Zoe Saldaña	Nominated	
Satellite Awards	26 January 2025	Best Adapted Screenplay	Jacques Audiard	Nominated	
Satellite Awards	26 January 2025	Best Film Editing	Juliette Welfling	Nominated	
Satellite Awards	26 January 2025	Best Original Song	Camille and Clément Ducol ("Mi Camino")	Won	
Satellite Awards	26 January 2025	Best Original Song	Camille, Clément Ducol and Jacques Audiard ("El Mal")	Nominated	
Satellite Awards	26 January 2025	Best Original Score	Clément Ducol, Camille	Won	
Satellite Awards	26 January 2025	Best Sound	Emilia Pérez	Nominated	
SCAD Savannah Film Festival	2 November 2024	Distinguished Performance Award	Karla Sofía Gascón	Won	
SCAD Savannah Film Festival	2 November 2024	Vanguard Award	Zoe Saldaña	Won	
Screen Actors Guild Awards	23 February 2025	Outstanding Performance by a Cast in a Motion Picture	Karla Sofía Gascón, Selena Gomez, Adriana Paz, Zoe Saldaña	Nominated	
Screen Actors Guild Awards	23 February 2025	Outstanding Performance by a Female Actor in a Leading Role	Karla Sofía Gascón	Nominated	
Screen Actors Guild Awards	23 February 2025	Outstanding Performance by a Female Actor in a Supporting Role	Zoe Saldaña	Won	
Seville European Film Festival	16 November 2024	Puerta América Award	Emilia Pérez	Nominated	
Set Decorators Society of America Awards	5 February 2025	Best Achievement in Decor/Design of a Contemporary Feature Film	Cécile Deleu and Emmanuelle Duplay	Nominated	
Soberano Awards	25 March 2025	Outstanding Actor/Actress Abroad	Zoe Saldaña	Won	
Society of Composers & Lyricists	12 February 2025	Outstanding Original Song for a Comedy or Musical Visual Media Production	"Mi Camino" – Clément Ducol, Camille	Nominated	
Society of Composers & Lyricists	12 February 2025	Outstanding Original Song for a Comedy or Musical Visual Media Production	"El Mal" – Clément Ducol, Camille, Jacques Audiard	Nominated	
Society of Composers & Lyricists	12 February 2025	Outstanding Original Score for a Studio Film	"Emilia Pérez" – Clément Ducol, Camille	Nominated	
Southern Eastern Film Critics Association Awards	16 December 2024	Best Supporting Actress	Zoe Saldaña	Runner-up	
Southern Eastern Film Critics Association Awards	16 December 2024	Best Foreign Language Film	Emilia Pérez	Won	
St. Louis Film Critics Association Awards	15 December 2024	Best Supporting Actress	Zoe Saldaña	Nominated	
St. Louis Film Critics Association Awards	15 December 2024	Best International Feature Film	Emilia Pérez	Nominated	
Stockholm International Film Festival	19 November 2024	FIPRESCI Best Film	Emilia Pérez	Won	
Stockholm International Film Festival	19 November 2024	Peroni 0.0% Audience Award	Emilia Pérez	Won	
Toronto Film Critics Association Awards	15 December 2024	Outstanding Lead Performance	Karla Sofía Gascón	Runner-up (Note: Tied with Adrien Brody for The Brutalist, Colman Domingo for Sing Sing, Ralph Fiennes for Conclave and Demi Moore for The Substance.)	
Toronto Film Critics Association Awards	15 December 2024	Outstanding Supporting Performance	Zoe Saldaña	Runner-up (Note: Tied with Clarence Maclin for Sing Sing, Jeremy Strong for The Apprentice, and Denzel Washington for Gladiator II)	
Toronto Film Critics Association Awards	15 December 2024	Outstanding Breakthrough Performance	Karla Sofía Gascón	Runner-up (Note: Tied with Mikey Madison for Anora)	
Toronto International Film Festival	15 September 2024	TIFF Variety Artisan Award	Clément Ducol and Camille	Won	
Toronto International Film Festival	15 September 2024	People's Choice Award	Emilia Pérez	Runner-up	
Vancouver Film Critics Circle	19 February 2025	Best Supporting Actress	Zoe Saldaña	Nominated	
Vancouver Film Critics Circle	19 February 2025	Best Foreign Language Film	Emilia Pérez	Nominated	
Venice International Film Festival	6 September 2025	Kinéo Award for Best International Actress	Karla Sofía Gascón	Won	
Washington D.C. Area Film Critics Association Awards	8 December 2024	Best Actress	Karla Sofía Gascón	Nominated	
Washington D.C. Area Film Critics Association Awards	8 December 2024	Best Supporting Actress	Zoe Saldaña	Nominated	
Washington D.C. Area Film Critics Association Awards	8 December 2024	Best International Film	Emilia Pérez	Won	
Women Film Critics Circle Awards	15 January 2025	Best Movie About Women	Emilia Pérez	Won	
Women Film Critics Circle Awards	15 January 2025	Best Foreign Film By or About Women	Emilia Pérez	Won	
Women Film Critics Circle Awards	15 January 2025	Best Supporting Actress	Zoe Saldaña	Won	
Women Film Critics Circle Awards	15 January 2025	Best Supporting Actress	Karla Sofía Gascón	Runner-up (Note: Tied with Felicity Jones and Danielle Deadwyler.)	
World Soundtrack Awards	October 15, 2025	Film Composer of the Year	Clément Ducol and Camille	Nominated	
World Soundtrack Awards	October 15, 2025	Best Original Song	"El Mal" (Clément Ducol, Camille, and Jacques Audiard, songwriters; Zoe Saldaña and Karla Sofía Gascón, performers)	Won	
