= Robert Budreau =

Canadian film director

- Born: London, Ontario
- Occupations: film director, producer, screenwriter
- Years active: 2000s–present
- Notable work: Born to Be Blue, Stockholm
- Awards: Canadian Screen Award for Best Adapted Screenplay (Stockholm), DGC Award for Best Direction in a Feature Film (Stockholm)

Robert Budreau (born January 25, 1974) is a Canadian film director, screenwriter, and producer. He made his feature film debut with That Beautiful Somewhere (2006) and is best known for writing and directing Born to Be Blue (2015) and Stockholm (2018). Budreau received the Canadian Screen Award for Best Adapted Screenplay and the Directors Guild of Canada Award for Best Direction in a Feature Film for Stockholm.

Through his production company, Lumanity Productions, he has also produced films including Delia’s Gone (2022) and Queen of Bones (2023).

== Biography ==
Budreau was born in London, Ontario, and raised in Ingersoll. He made a number of short films before releasing his feature debut, That Beautiful Somewhere, in 2006. His second feature film, Born to Be Blue, followed in 2015. In 2018 he released Stockholm, for which he won the award for Best Adapted Screenplay at the 7th Canadian Screen Awards and the Directors Guild of Canada's DGC Award for Best Direction in a Feature Film.

His fourth feature film, Delia's Gone, entered production in 2020 and was released in 2022.

Through his production firm Lumanity Productions, Budreau has also produced short and feature films by other directors.

== Filmography ==
- Dylanology (2002)
- The Multiple Selves of Hannah Maynard (2003)
- Dream Recording (2003)
- Photographic Fate (2003)
- Do No Harm (2004)
- Judgment Call (2004)
- The Unfolding (2004)
- Yesteryears (2005)
- Welcome (2005)
- Dry Whiskey (2005)
- Drag (2006)
- Sunshine Swim Team (2006)
- The Secret Miracle (2006)
- The Unspoken Promise (2006)
- That Beautiful Somewhere (2006)
- Sunshine Swim Team (2008)
- As You Like It (2010)
- The Boss (2010)
- Bodyslam (2013)
- Solo (2013)
- Bank$tas / Cubicle Warriors (2014)
- Born to Be Blue (2015)
- Stockholm (2018)
- Delia's Gone (2022)
- Queen of Bones (2023)
- The Borderline (2026)
