= Delia's Gone (film) =

American-Canadian drama film

- Poster
- Directed by: Robert Budreau
- Written by: Robert Budreau
- Based on: Caged Bird Sing by Michael Hamblin
- Produced by: Robert Budreau; Jonathan Bronfman
- Starring: Stephan James; Marisa Tomei; Paul Walter Hauser; Travis Fimmel
- Edited by: Geoff Ashenhurst
- Music by: David Braid
- Production companies: JoBro Productions; Lumanity
- Distributed by: Vertical Entertainment
- Release date: August 19, 2022 (United States)
- Running time: 91min
- Countries: United States; Canada
- Language: English

Delia's Gone is a 2022 drama film written, directed, and produced by Robert Budreau, based on a short story by Michael Hamblin entitled "Caged Bird Sing." It stars Stephan James, Marisa Tomei, Paul Walter Hauser, and Travis Fimmel.

== Plot ==
The film follows Louis, a young man with an intellectual disability, who is wrongfully convicted of the brutal murder of his older sister, Delia. The primary evidence against him is his own coerced confession, which he doesn't fully understand due to his condition.

After spending five years in a psychiatric prison, Louis is released on parole. Haunted by fragmented memories of the night Delia died and plagued by visions of her, Louis becomes obsessed with finding the real killer and clearing his own name. His journey leads him to re-investigate the crime, following scant clues and his own muddled recollections. He forms an unlikely and tense bond with a former police officer, Rolly, who has his own regrets about the case.

As Louis pieces together the events of that fateful night, he uncovers small-town secrets and confronts the people from his past. The film builds towards a climax where the truth is finally revealed, exposing the real perpetrator and the tragic circumstances that led to Delia's death.

== Cast ==
- Stephan James as Louis
- Marisa Tomei as Francine "Fran" Cole, the Sheriff of Ledding County and later an Ohio State Highway Patrol detective
- Paul Walter Hauser as Bo Walston, a Deputy and later Sheriff of Ledding County
- Travis Fimmel as Stacker Cole
- Genelle Williams as Delia
- Kate Moyer as Rose
- Michelle Giroux as Helena
- Hamza Haq as Larry
- Graham Abbey as Billy
- Billy MacLellan as Lyle

== Production ==
On October 13, 2020, it was announced Stephan James, Marisa Tomei and Paul Walter Hauser had joined the cast of the film. On October 21, 2020, Travis Fimmel joined the cast.

Principal photography began in October 2020.

== Release ==
The film was released in theaters and through video on demand in the United States on August 19, 2022 by Vertical Entertainment.

== Reception ==
On review aggregator website Rotten Tomatoes, the film has an approval rating of 31% based on 16 reviews, with an average rating of 5.7/10. On Metacritic, the film has a score of 40 out of 100 based on four reviews, indicating "mixed or average" reviews.

== Awards ==
David Braid received a Canadian Screen Award nomination for Best Original Song at the 10th Canadian Screen Awards for the song "Ring Them Fantasy".

The film was shortlisted for Best Direction in a Feature Film at the 2022 Directors Guild of Canada awards.
