= Stereotypes of French people =

Generalized representations of French people

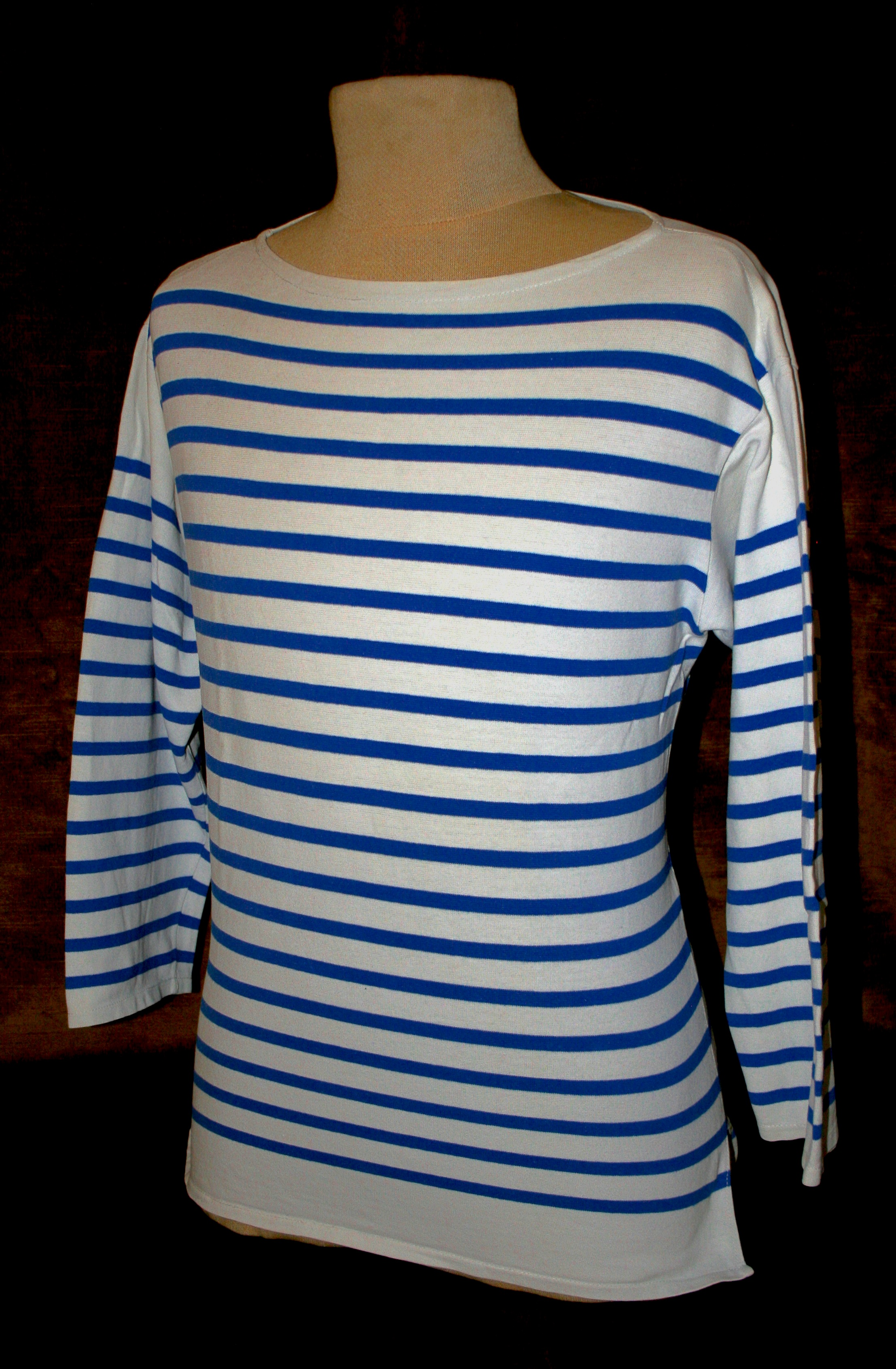
The Marinière is a French article of clothing commonly used in stereotypical depictions of the French.

Stereotypes of French people include real or imagined characteristics of the French people used by people who see the French people as a single and homogeneous group. French stereotypes are common beliefs among those expressing anti-French sentiment.

There exist stereotypes of French people amongst themselves depending on the region.

== United Kingdom ==
Stereotypes of the French by the British people, especially the English people, have existed for centuries. This is in part due to the many Anglo-French Wars (1193–1815).

== United States ==
Americans view the French as effeminate and cowardly. Stereotypes of the French have been an established part of the culture of the United States. The French have a reputation for tipping poorly.

== Common stereotypes ==
=== Culinary ===
French cuisine is a major part of French culture, and French food is often regarded as among the best in the world, with The Guardian stating "a really fine French dish represents one of the undisputed pinnacles of human cultural achievement."

The French are commonly regarded to enjoy eating cheese, snails, frog legs, and plenty of bread, particularly baguettes and croissants. The French are also known for their fondness for wine.

=== High fashion ===
France, particularly Paris, has been perceived for being a high fashion place where designer clothes and cosmetics are made.

=== Hygiene ===
The French are perceived as having poor hygiene, originating from American soldiers during World War II.

=== Laziness ===
The perception that French workers are prone to strikes and take a lot of time off has established a stereotype of the French being workshy.

=== Onion Johnny ===
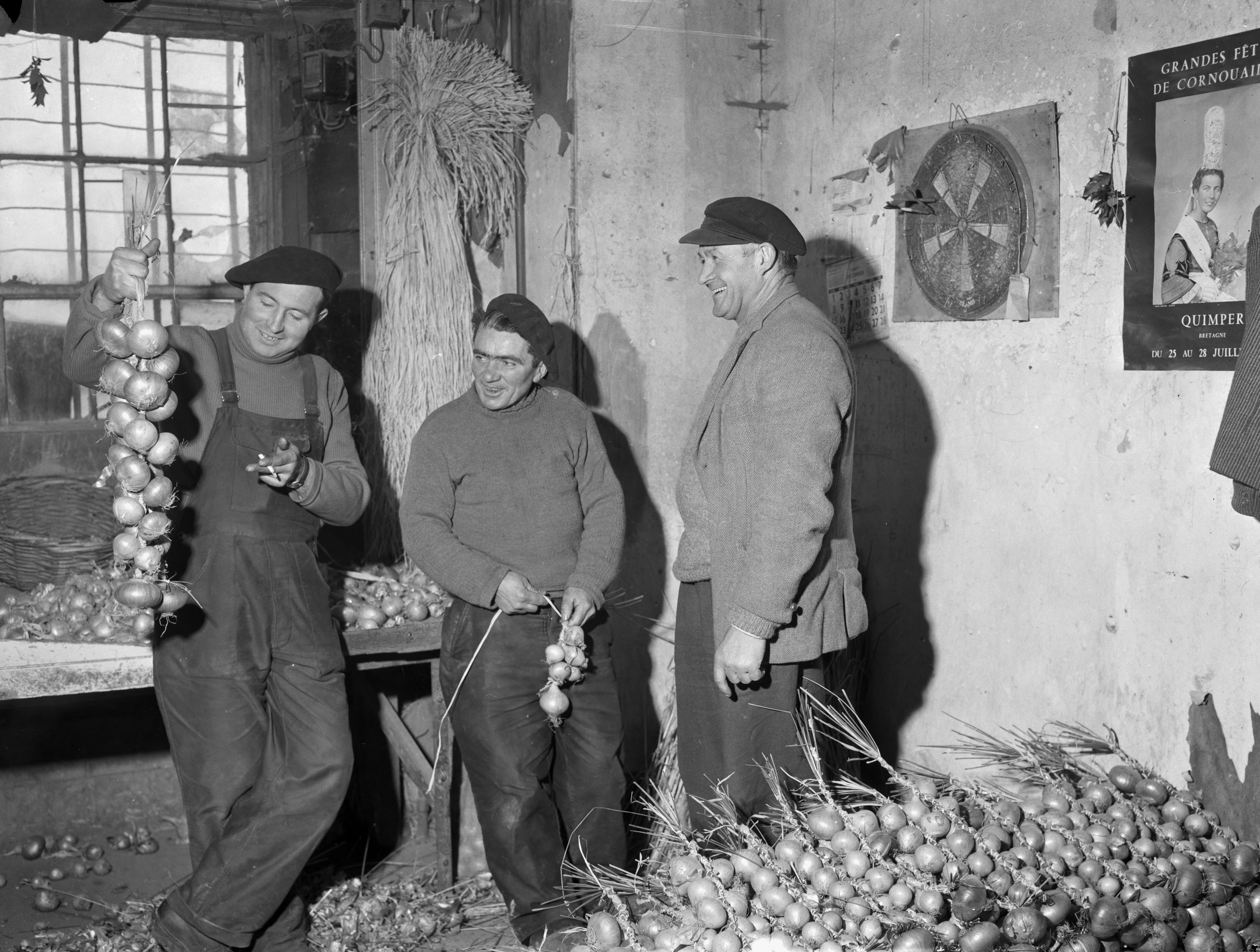
Onion Johnnies in Wales, 1958

A common stereotypical image of French people, especially in British media, was of a man on a bicycle wearing a striped jumper and beret with a string of onions around his neck. This derives from the "Onion Johnny", a nickname for Breton itinerant onion-sellers who cycled around England and Wales in the 20th century; for many British people, this would be their only contact with French people.

=== Military ===
Despite being one of the world's leading powers, the French Army has sometimes had a reputation for cowardice as a result of their rapid defeat in the Battle of France.

=== Romance ===
French people are perceived as being very romantic.

=== Rudeness ===
French waiters have been perceived as rude and disrespectful, especially to foreigners who speak little to no French.

=== Smokers ===
Smoking in France is a common trope when associated with France, especially the local Gauloises brand.

== See also ==
- Cheese-eating surrender monkeys
