= 97th Academy Awards =

- Official poster
- Date: March 2, 2025
- Site: Dolby Theatre; Hollywood, Los Angeles, California, U.S.
- Hosted by: Conan O'Brien
- Preshow hosts: Julianne Hough; Jesse Palmer
- Produced by: Raj Kapoor; Katy Mullan
- Directed by: Hamish Hamilton

Highlights
- Best Picture: Anora
- Most awards: Anora (5)
- Most nominations: Emilia Pérez (13)

TV in the United States
- Network: ABC; Hulu
- Duration: 3 hours, 50 minutes
- Ratings: 19.69 million 9.1% (Nielsen ratings)

The 97th Academy Awards ceremony, presented by the Academy of Motion Picture Arts and Sciences (AMPAS), took place on March 2, 2025, at the Dolby Theatre in Hollywood, Los Angeles. During the gala, the AMPAS presented Academy Awards (commonly referred to as Oscars) in 23 categories honoring films released in 2024. The ceremony, televised in the United States by ABC and streamed on Hulu, was produced by Raj Kapoor and Katy Mullan, and was directed by Hamish Hamilton. Comedian Conan O'Brien hosted the show for the first time.

In related events, the Academy held its 15th Governors Awards ceremony at the Ray Dolby Ballroom of the Ovation Hollywood complex in Hollywood, on November 17, 2024. The Academy Scientific and Technical Awards were presented by host Diego Luna on April 29, 2025, in a ceremony at the Academy Museum of Motion Pictures in Los Angeles.

Anora won a leading five awards, including Best Picture. Other winners included The Brutalist with three awards; Dune: Part Two, Emilia Pérez, and Wicked with two awards each; and Conclave, Flow, I'm Not a Robot, I'm Still Here, In the Shadow of the Cypress, No Other Land, The Only Girl in the Orchestra, A Real Pain, and The Substance with one each. The telecast drew 19.69 million viewers in the United States.

== Winners and nominees ==
The nominees for the 97th Academy Awards were announced on January 23, 2025, at the Samuel Goldwyn Theater in Beverly Hills, by actress Rachel Sennott and actor Bowen Yang. Emilia Pérez led all nominees with thirteen nominations, the most for a non-English-language film in Oscars history; The Brutalist and Wicked tied for second with ten nominations each. The winners were announced during the awards ceremony on March 2.

For the first time in Oscar history, two films, Emilia Pérez and I'm Still Here, were nominated simultaneously for Best Picture and Best International Feature. I'm Still Here was also the first Portuguese-language film nominated for Best Picture. With his wins for producing, directing, screenwriting, and film editing Anora, Sean Baker became the second person to win four awards in one night after Walt Disney did so at the 26th ceremony in 1954, and the first to do so for a single film. (Note: While Bong Joon Ho received four statuettes for Parasite (2019), AMPAS recognizes the country of the film as the winner of the Best International Feature award with the director accepting the award on behalf of said country.) Best Actor winner Adrien Brody gave the longest acceptance speech in Oscar history at 5 minutes and 37 seconds. Best Actress nominee Karla Sofía Gascón became the first openly transgender performer to be nominated for an acting category. Best Supporting Actress winner Zoe Saldaña was the first Dominican American to win an Oscar. Best Costume Design winner Paul Tazewell became the first Black man to win that category. Best Animated Feature winner Flow was the first independently animated film to win that category and the first Latvian film to win an Oscar. Best Documentary Feature winner No Other Land became the first Palestinian film to win an Oscar.

=== Awards ===
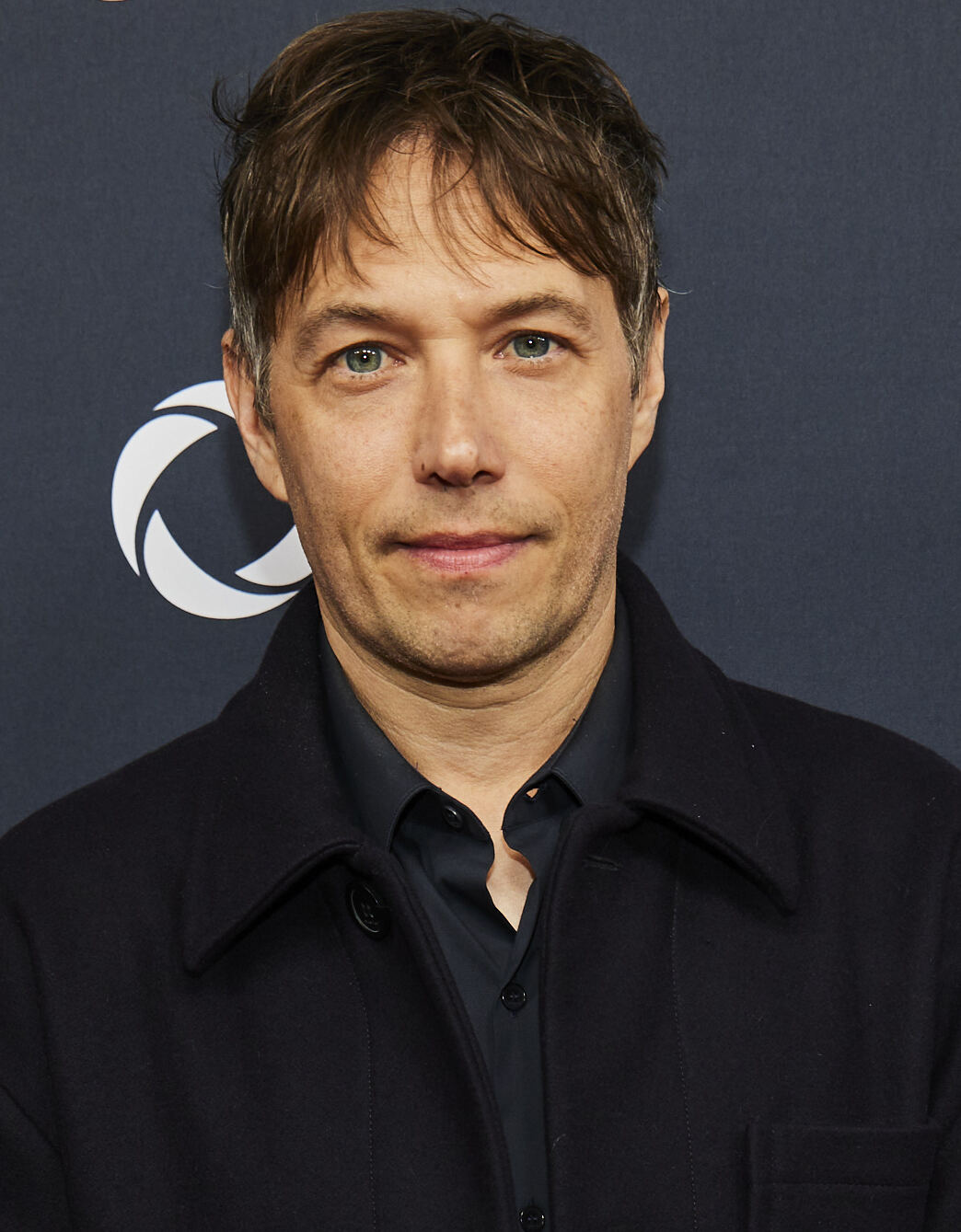
Sean Baker, Best Picture co-winner, and Best Director, Best Original Screenplay and Best Film Editing winner

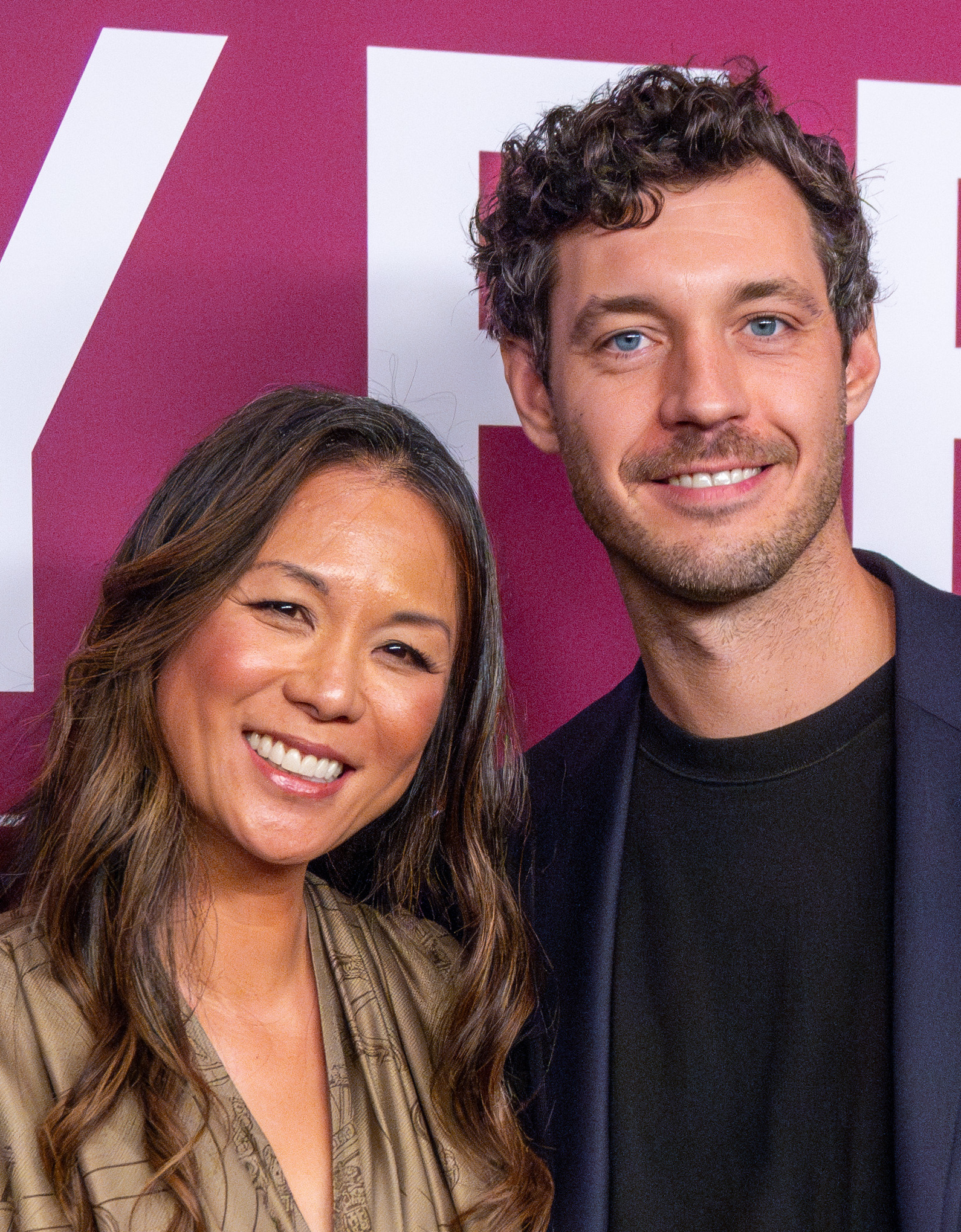
Samantha Quan (left) and Alex Coco (right), Best Picture co-winners

Adrien Brody, Best Actor winner

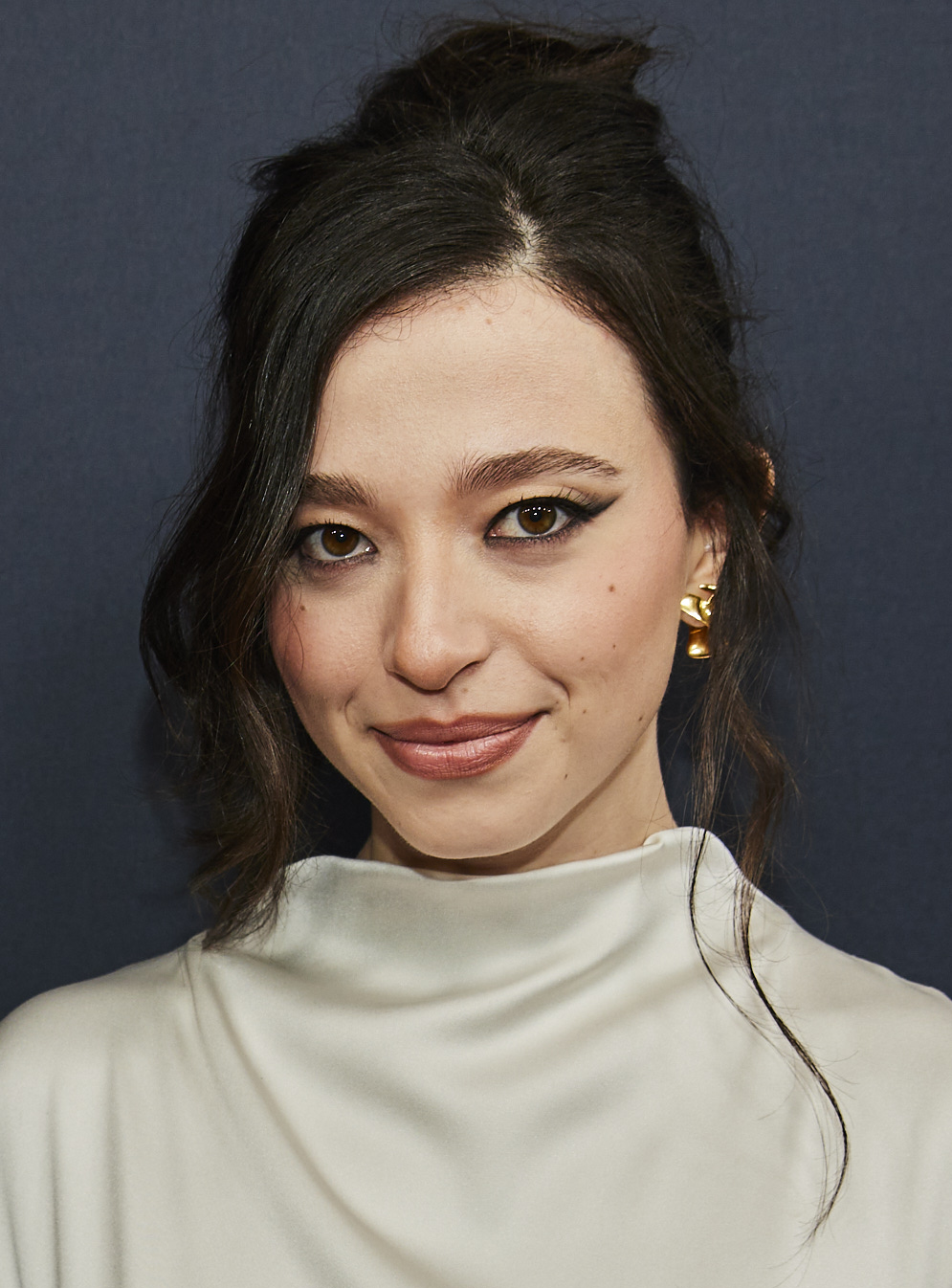
Mikey Madison, Best Actress winner

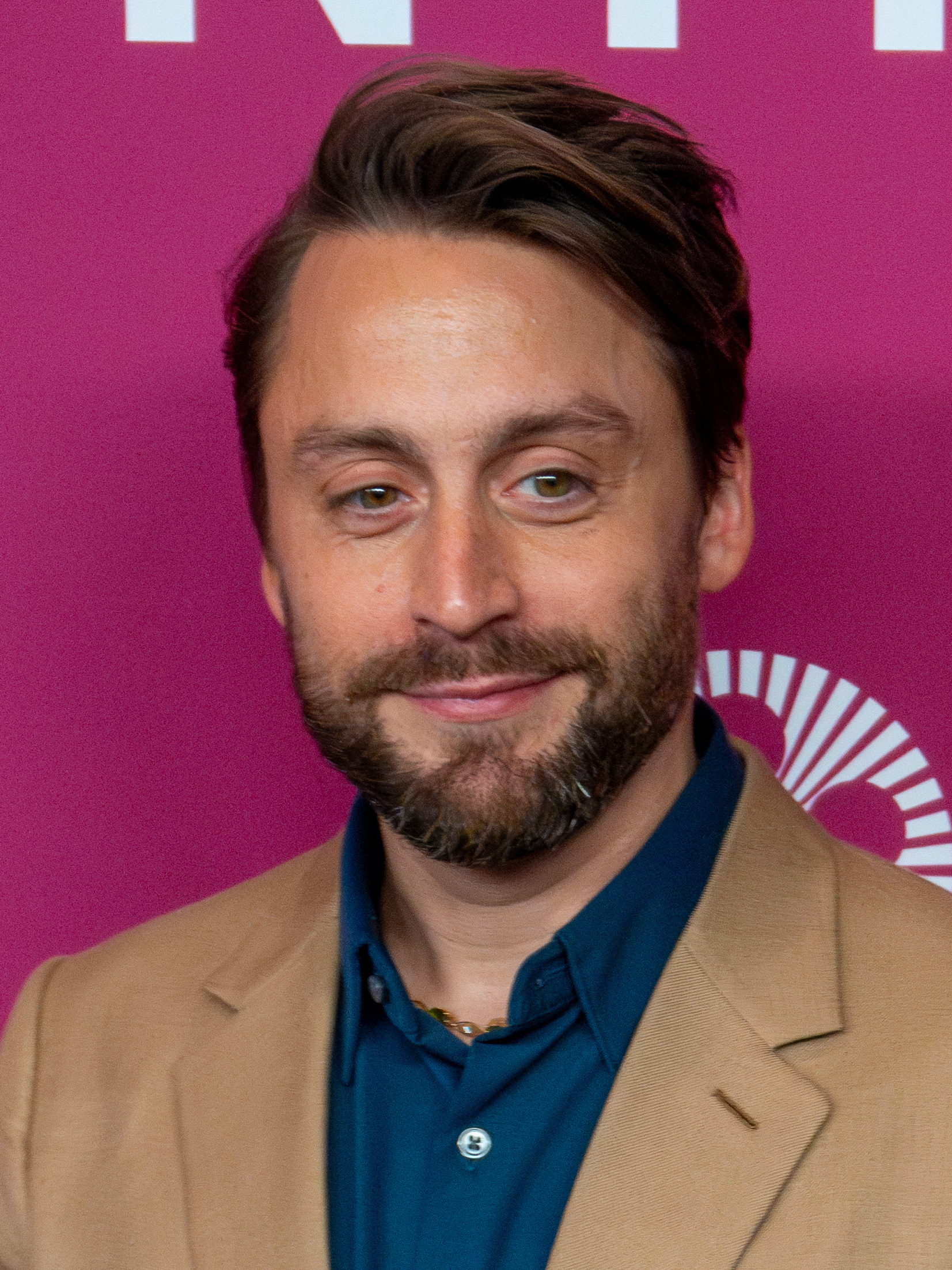
Kieran Culkin, Best Supporting Actor winner

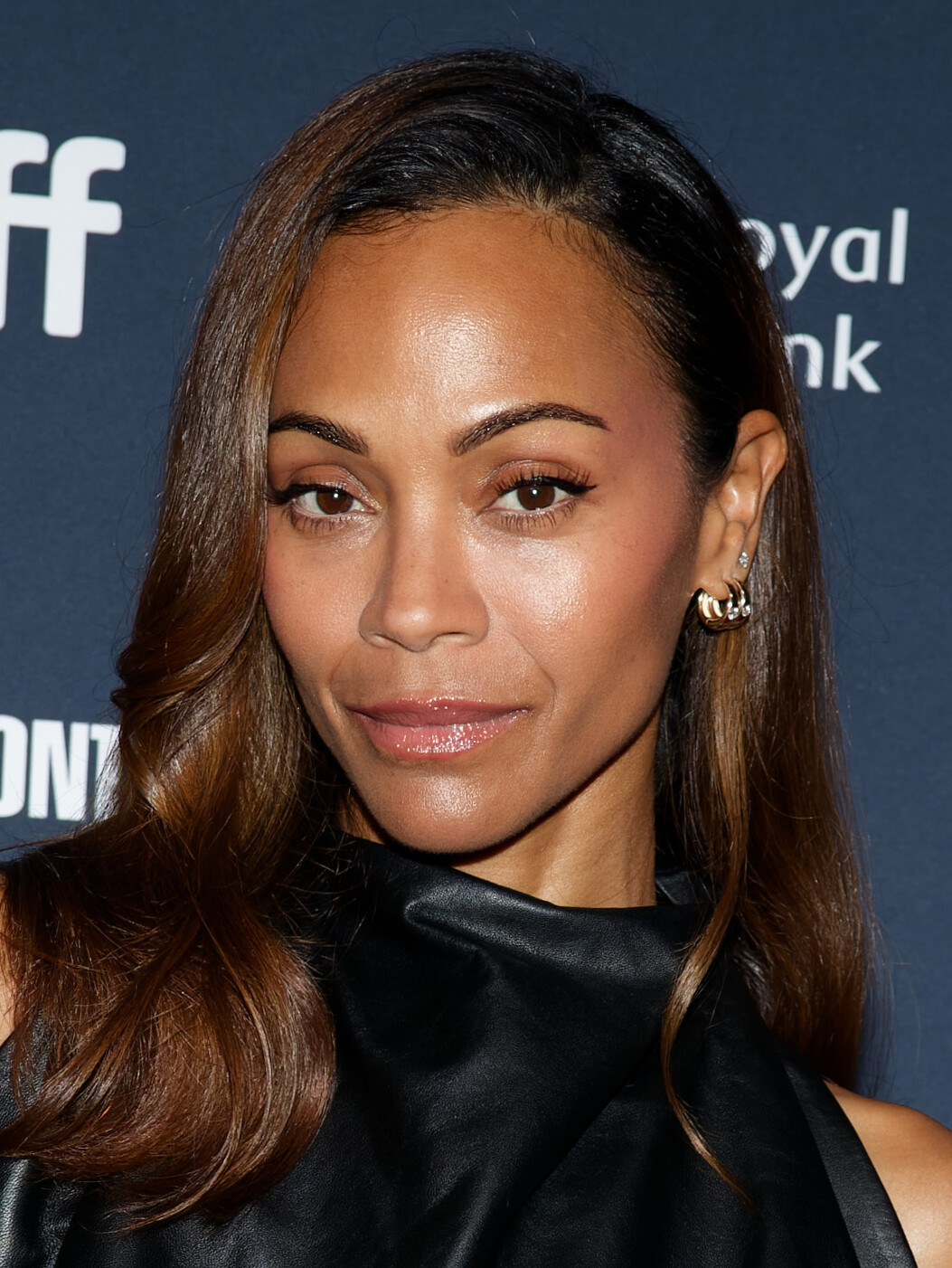
Zoe Saldaña, Best Supporting Actress winner

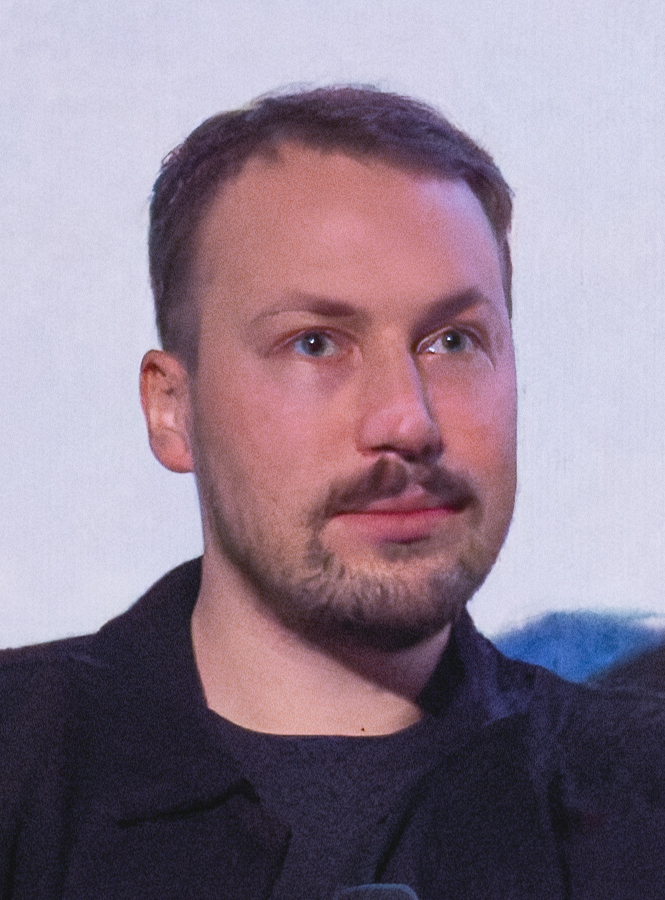
Gints Zilbalodis, Best Animated Feature Film co-winner

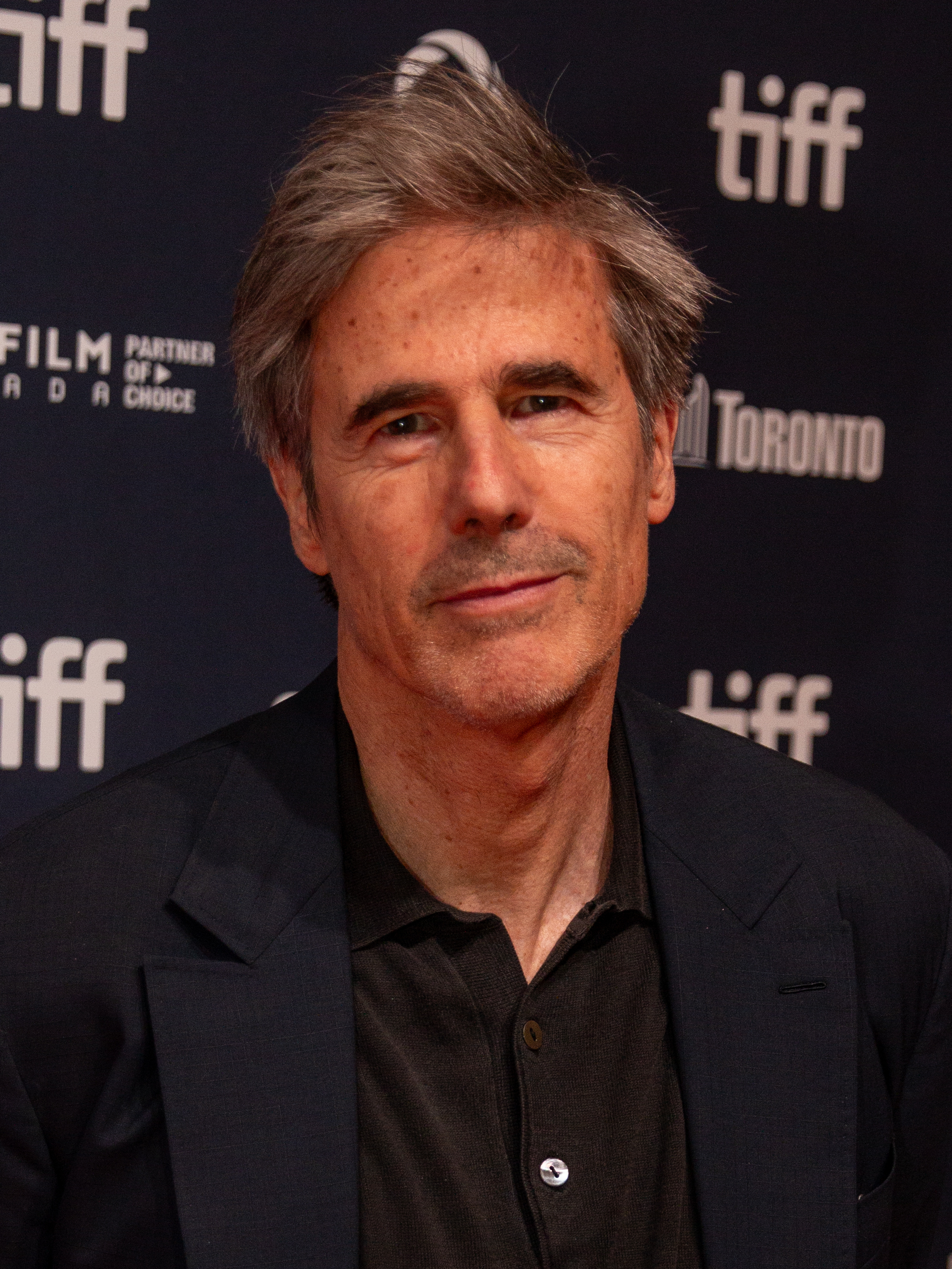
Walter Salles, Best International Feature Film winner

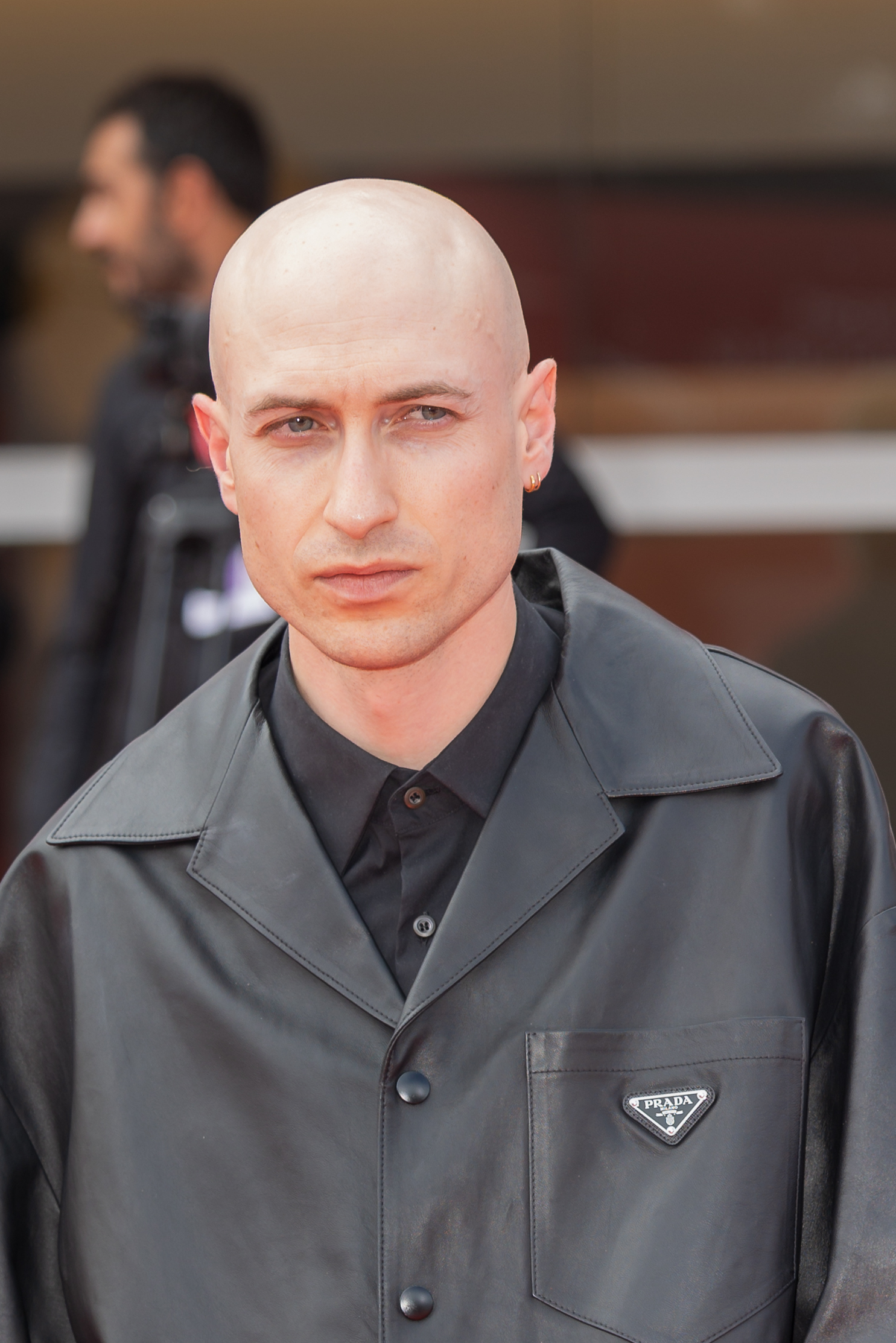
Daniel Blumberg, Best Original Score winner

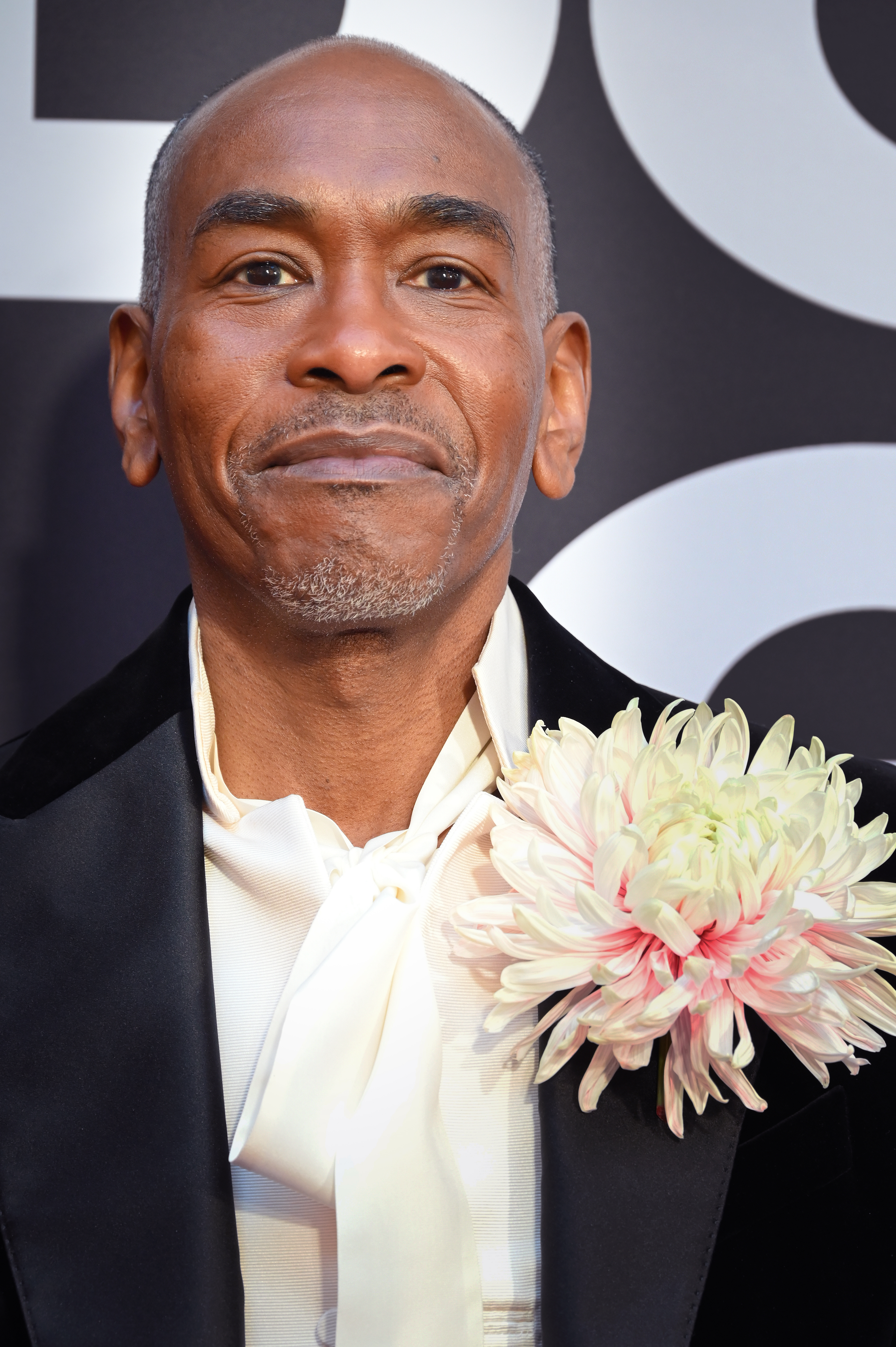
Paul Tazewell, Best Costume Design winner

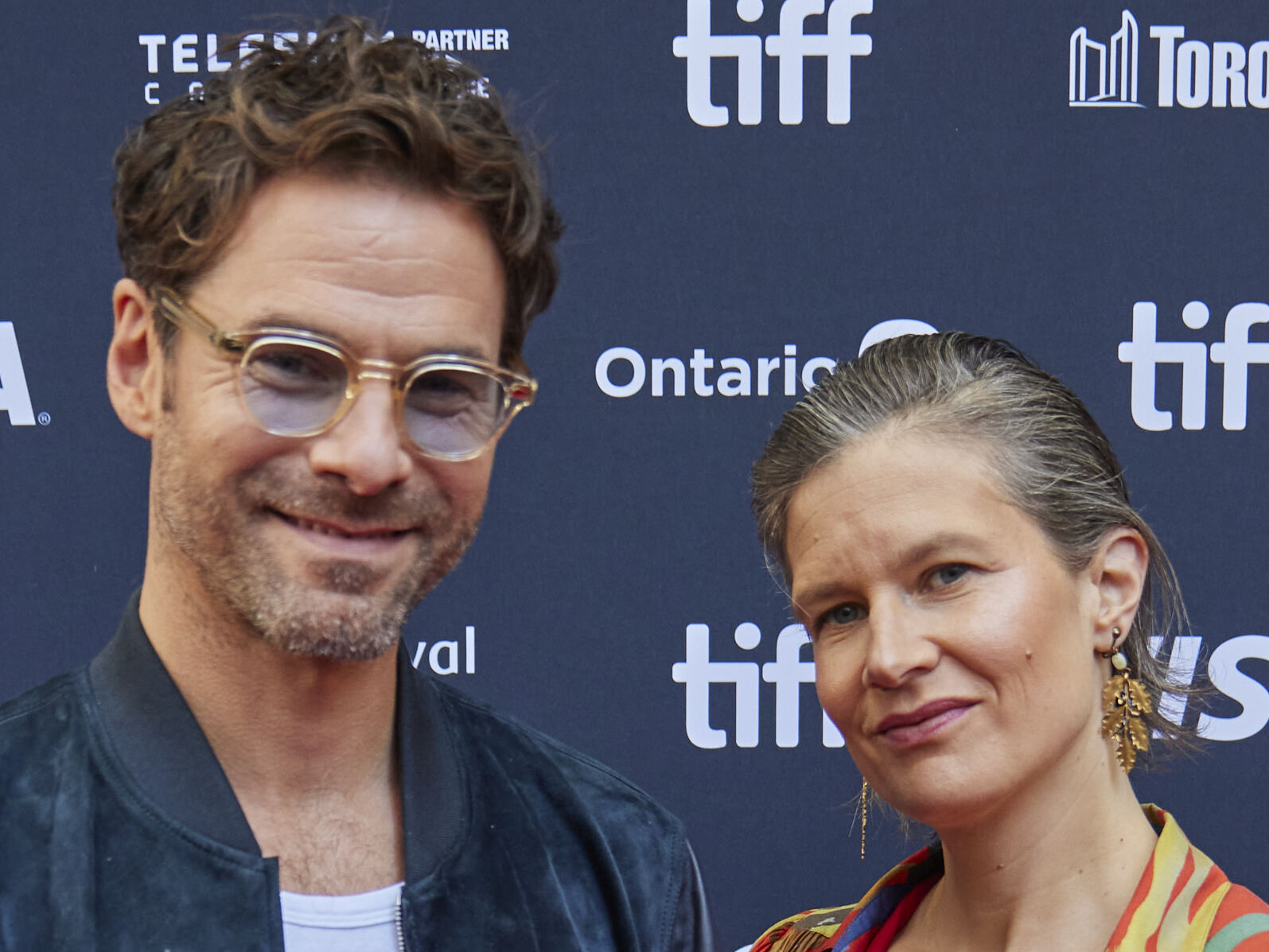
Clément Ducol (left) and Camille (right), Best Original Song co-winners

Winners are listed first, highlighted in boldface, and indicated with a double dagger (‡).

**Best Picture**: **Anora – Alex Coco, Samantha Quan, and Sean Baker, producers ‡**; The Brutalist – Nick Gordon, Brian Young, Andrew Morrison, D.J. Gugenheim, and Brady Corbet, producers; A Complete Unknown – Fred Berger, James Mangold, and Alex Heineman, producers; Conclave – Tessa Ross, Juliette Howell, and Michael A. Jackman, producers; Dune: Part Two – Mary Parent, Cale Boyter, Tanya Lapointe, and Denis Villeneuve, producers; Emilia Pérez – Pascal Caucheteux and Jacques Audiard, producers; I'm Still Here – Maria Carlota Bruno and Rodrigo Teixeira, producers; Nickel Boys – Dede Gardner, Jeremy Kleiner, and Joslyn Barnes, producers; The Substance – Coralie Fargeat, Tim Bevan, and Eric Fellner, producers; Wicked – Marc Platt, producer	**Best Directing**: **Sean Baker – Anora ‡**; Brady Corbet – The Brutalist; James Mangold – A Complete Unknown; Jacques Audiard – Emilia Pérez; Coralie Fargeat – The Substance
**Best Actor in a Leading Role**: **Adrien Brody – The Brutalist as László Tóth ‡**; Timothée Chalamet – A Complete Unknown as Bob Dylan; Colman Domingo – Sing Sing as John "Divine G" Whitfield; Ralph Fiennes – Conclave as Cardinal Thomas Lawrence; Sebastian Stan – The Apprentice as Donald Trump	**Best Actress in a Leading Role**: **Mikey Madison – Anora as Anora "Ani" Mikheeva ‡**; Cynthia Erivo – Wicked as Elphaba Thropp; Karla Sofía Gascón – Emilia Pérez as Emilia Pérez / Juan "Manitas" Del Monte; Demi Moore – The Substance as Elisabeth Sparkle; Fernanda Torres – I'm Still Here as Eunice Paiva
**Best Actor in a Supporting Role**: **Kieran Culkin – A Real Pain as Benji Kaplan ‡**; Yura Borisov – Anora as Igor; Edward Norton – A Complete Unknown as Pete Seeger; Guy Pearce – The Brutalist as Harrison Lee Van Buren Sr.; Jeremy Strong – The Apprentice as Roy Cohn	**Best Actress in a Supporting Role**: **Zoe Saldaña – Emilia Pérez as Rita Mora Castro ‡**; Monica Barbaro – A Complete Unknown as Joan Baez; Ariana Grande – Wicked as Galinda "Glinda" Upland; Felicity Jones – The Brutalist as Erzsébet Tóth; Isabella Rossellini – Conclave as Sister Agnes
**Best Writing (Original Screenplay)**: **Anora – Sean Baker ‡**; The Brutalist – Brady Corbet and Mona Fastvold; A Real Pain – Jesse Eisenberg; September 5 – Moritz Binder and Tim Fehlbaum; co-written by Alex David; The Substance – Coralie Fargeat	**Best Writing (Adapted Screenplay)**: **Conclave – Peter Straughan; based on the novel by Robert Harris ‡**; A Complete Unknown – James Mangold and Jay Cocks; based on the book Dylan Goes Electric! by Elijah Wald; Emilia Pérez – Jacques Audiard; in collaboration with Thomas Bidegain, Léa Mysius, and Nicolas Livecchi; based on the opera libretto Emilia Pérez by Jacques Audiard and the novel Écoute by Boris Razon; Nickel Boys – RaMell Ross and Joslyn Barnes; based on the novel The Nickel Boys by Colson Whitehead; Sing Sing – Screenplay by Clint Bentley and Greg Kwedar; story by Clint Bentley, Greg Kwedar, Clarence Maclin, and John "Divine G" Whitfield; based on the book The Sing Sing Follies by John H. Richardson and the play Breakin' the Mummy's Code by Brent Buell
**Best Animated Feature Film**: **Flow – Gints Zilbalodis, Matīss Kaža, Ron Dyens, and Gregory Zalcman ‡**; Inside Out 2 – Kelsey Mann and Mark Nielsen; Memoir of a Snail – Adam Elliot and Liz Kearney; Wallace & Gromit: Vengeance Most Fowl – Nick Park, Merlin Crossingham, and Richard Beek; The Wild Robot – Chris Sanders and Jeff Hermann	**Best International Feature Film**: **I'm Still Here (Brazil) in Portuguese – directed by Walter Salles ‡**; Emilia Pérez (France) in Spanish – directed by Jacques Audiard; Flow (Latvia) – directed by Gints Zilbalodis; The Girl with the Needle (Denmark) in Danish – directed by Magnus von Horn; The Seed of the Sacred Fig (Germany) in Persian – directed by Mohammad Rasoulof
**Best Documentary Feature Film**: **No Other Land – Basel Adra, Rachel Szor, Hamdan Ballal, and Yuval Abraham ‡**; Black Box Diaries – Shiori Itō, Eric Nyari, and Hanna Aqvilin; Porcelain War – Brendan Bellomo, Slava Leontyev, Aniela Sidorska, and Paula DuPré Pesmen; Soundtrack to a Coup d'Etat – Johan Grimonprez, Daan Milius, and Rémi Grellety; Sugarcane – Julian Brave NoiseCat, Emily Kassie, and Kellen Quinn	**Best Documentary Short Film**: **The Only Girl in the Orchestra – Molly O'Brien and Lisa Remington ‡**; Death by Numbers – Kim A. Snyder and Janique L. Robillard; I Am Ready, Warden – Smriti Mundhra and Maya Gnyp; Incident – Bill Morrison and Jamie Kalven; Instruments of a Beating Heart – Ema Ryan Yamazaki and Eric Nyari
**Best Short Film (Live Action)**: **I'm Not a Robot – Victoria Warmerdam and Trent ‡**; A Lien – Sam Cutler-Kreutz and David Cutler-Kreutz; Anuja – Adam J. Graves and Suchitra Mattai; The Last Ranger – Cindy Lee and Darwin Shaw; The Man Who Could Not Remain Silent – Nebojša Slijepčević and Danijel Pek	**Best Animated Short Film**: **In the Shadow of the Cypress – Shirin Sohani and Hossein Molayemi ‡**; Beautiful Men – Nicolas Keppens and Brecht Van Elslande; Magic Candies – Daisuke Nishio and Takashi Washio; Wander to Wonder – Nina Gantz and Stienette Bosklopper; Yuck! – Loïc Espuche and Juliette Marquet
**Best Music (Original Score)**: **The Brutalist – Daniel Blumberg ‡**; Conclave – Volker Bertelmann; Emilia Pérez – Clément Ducol and Camille; Wicked – John Powell and Stephen Schwartz; The Wild Robot – Kris Bowers	**Best Music (Original Song)**: **"El Mal" from Emilia Pérez – Music by Clément Ducol and Camille; lyrics by Clément Ducol, Camille, and Jacques Audiard ‡**; "The Journey" from The Six Triple Eight – Music and lyrics by Diane Warren; "Like a Bird" from Sing Sing – Music and lyrics by Abraham Alexander and Adrian Quesada; "Mi camino" from Emilia Pérez – Music and lyrics by Camille and Clément Ducol; "Never Too Late" from Elton John: Never Too Late – Music and lyrics by Elton John, Brandi Carlile, Andrew Watt, and Bernie Taupin
**Best Sound**: **Dune: Part Two – Gareth John, Richard King, Ron Bartlett, and Doug Hemphill ‡**; A Complete Unknown – Tod A. Maitland, Donald Sylvester, Ted Caplan, Paul Massey, and David Giammarco; Emilia Pérez – Erwan Kerzanet, Aymeric Devoldère, Maxence Dussère, Cyril Holtz, and Niels Barletta; Wicked – Simon Hayes, Nancy Nugent Title, Jack Dolman, Andy Nelson, and John Marquis; The Wild Robot – Randy Thom, Brian Chumney, Gary A. Rizzo, and Leff Lefferts	**Best Production Design**: **Wicked – Production Design: Nathan Crowley; Set Decoration: Lee Sandales ‡**; The Brutalist – Production Design: Judy Becker; Set Decoration: Patricia Cuccia; Conclave – Production Design: Suzie Davies; Set Decoration: Cynthia Sleiter; Dune: Part Two – Production Design: Patrice Vermette; Set Decoration: Shane Vieau; Nosferatu – Production Design: Craig Lathrop; Set Decoration: Beatrice Brentnerová
**Best Cinematography**: **The Brutalist – Lol Crawley ‡**; Dune: Part Two – Greig Fraser; Emilia Pérez – Paul Guilhaume; Maria – Edward Lachman; Nosferatu – Jarin Blaschke	**Best Makeup and Hairstyling**: **The Substance – Pierre-Olivier Persin, Stéphanie Guillon, and Marilyne Scarselli ‡**; A Different Man – Mike Marino, David Presto, and Crystal Jurado; Emilia Pérez – Julia Floch Carbonel, Emmanuel Janvier, and Jean-Christophe Spadaccini; Nosferatu – David White, Traci Loader, and Suzanne Stokes-Munton; Wicked – Frances Hannon, Laura Blount, and Sarah Nuth
**Best Costume Design**: **Wicked – Paul Tazewell ‡**; A Complete Unknown – Arianne Phillips; Conclave – Lisy Christl; Gladiator II – Janty Yates and Dave Crossman; Nosferatu – Linda Muir	**Best Film Editing**: **Anora – Sean Baker ‡**; The Brutalist – Dávid Jancsó; Conclave – Nick Emerson; Emilia Pérez – Juliette Welfling; Wicked – Myron Kerstein
**Best Visual Effects**: **Dune: Part Two – Paul Lambert, Stephen James, Rhys Salcombe, and Gerd Nefzer ‡**; Alien: Romulus – Eric Barba, Nelson Sepulveda-Fauser, Daniel Macarin, and Shane Mahan; Better Man – Luke Millar, David Clayton, Keith Herft, and Peter Stubbs; Kingdom of the Planet of the Apes – Erik Winquist, Stephen Unterfranz, Paul Story, and Rodney Burke; Wicked – Pablo Helman, Jonathan Fawkner, David Shirk, and Paul Corbould

=== Governors Awards ===
The Academy held its 15th annual Governors Awards ceremony on November 17, 2024, during which the following awards were presented:

==== Honorary Awards ====
- To Quincy Jones, for his artistic genius, relentless creativity and trailblazing legacy in film music. (posthumous)
- To Juliet Taylor, for her expansive body of work and indelible influence on the field of film casting.

==== Irving G. Thalberg Memorial Award ====
- Michael G. Wilson and Barbara Broccoli – For "their contribution to the industry's theatrical landscape".

==== Jean Hersholt Humanitarian Award ====
- Richard Curtis – "A brilliant comedic storyteller [with] tremendous charitable efforts".

=== Films with multiple nominations and awards ===
Films with multiple nominations
Nominations	Film
13	Emilia Pérez
10	The Brutalist
10	Wicked
8	A Complete Unknown
8	Conclave
6	Anora
5	Dune: Part Two
5	The Substance
4	Nosferatu
3	I'm Still Here
3	Sing Sing
3	The Wild Robot
2	The Apprentice
2	Flow
2	Nickel Boys
2	A Real Pain

Films with multiple wins
Awards	Film
5	Anora
3	The Brutalist
2	Dune: Part Two
2	Emilia Pérez
2	Wicked

== Presenters and performers ==
The following individuals, listed in order of appearance, presented awards or performed musical numbers: (Note: Attributed to multiple references:)

Presenters
Name(s)	Role
Nick Offerman	Served as announcer for the 97th Academy Awards
Robert Downey Jr.	Presented the award for Best Supporting Actor
Andrew Garfield; Goldie Hawn	Presented the awards for Best Animated Feature and Best Animated Short Film
Lily-Rose Depp; Elle Fanning; John Lithgow; Connie Nielsen; Bowen Yang	Presented the award for Best Costume Design
Amy Poehler	Presented the awards for Best Original Screenplay and Best Adapted Screenplay
Scarlett Johansson; June Squibb	Presented the award for Best Makeup and Hairstyling
Halle Berry	Presented the segment of Governors Awards and the James Bond tribute to Barbara Broccoli and Michael G. Wilson
Daryl Hannah	Presented the award for Best Film Editing
Da'Vine Joy Randolph	Presented the award for Best Supporting Actress
Ben Stiller	Presented the award for Best Production Design
Mick Jagger	Presented the award for Best Original Song
Selena Gomez; Samuel L. Jackson	Presented the awards for Best Documentary Short Film and Best Documentary Feature
Miley Cyrus; Miles Teller	Presented the award for Best Sound
Gal Gadot; Rachel Zegler	Presented the award for Best Visual Effects
Ana de Armas; Sterling K. Brown	Presented the award for Best Live Action Short Film
Morgan Freeman	Presented the "In Memoriam" segment
Joe Alwyn; Dave Bautista; Willem Dafoe; Alba Rohrwacher; Zoe Saldaña	Presented the award for Best Cinematography
Penélope Cruz	Presented the award for Best International Feature Film
Mark Hamill	Presented the award for Best Original Score
Whoopi Goldberg; Oprah Winfrey	Introduced the musical tribute to Quincy Jones
Cillian Murphy	Presented the award for Best Actor
Quentin Tarantino	Presented the award for Best Director
Emma Stone	Presented the award for Best Actress
Billy Crystal; Meg Ryan	Presented the award for Best Picture

Performers
Name	Role	Performed
Michael Bearden	Conductor; Musical director	Orchestral
Ariana Grande; Cynthia Erivo	Performers	"Over the Rainbow" from The Wizard of Oz "Home" from The Wiz "Defying Gravity" from Wicked
Conan O'Brien	Performer	"I Won't Waste Time" during the opening monologue
Margaret Qualley; Lisa; Doja Cat; Raye	Performers	"Live and Let Die" from Live and Let Die "Diamonds Are Forever" from Diamonds Are Forever "Skyfall" from Skyfall
Los Angeles Master Chorale	Performers	"Lacrimosa" from Mozart's Requiem during the "In Memoriam" segment
Queen Latifah	Performer	"Ease On down the Road" from The Wiz during the tribute to Quincy Jones

== Ceremony information ==
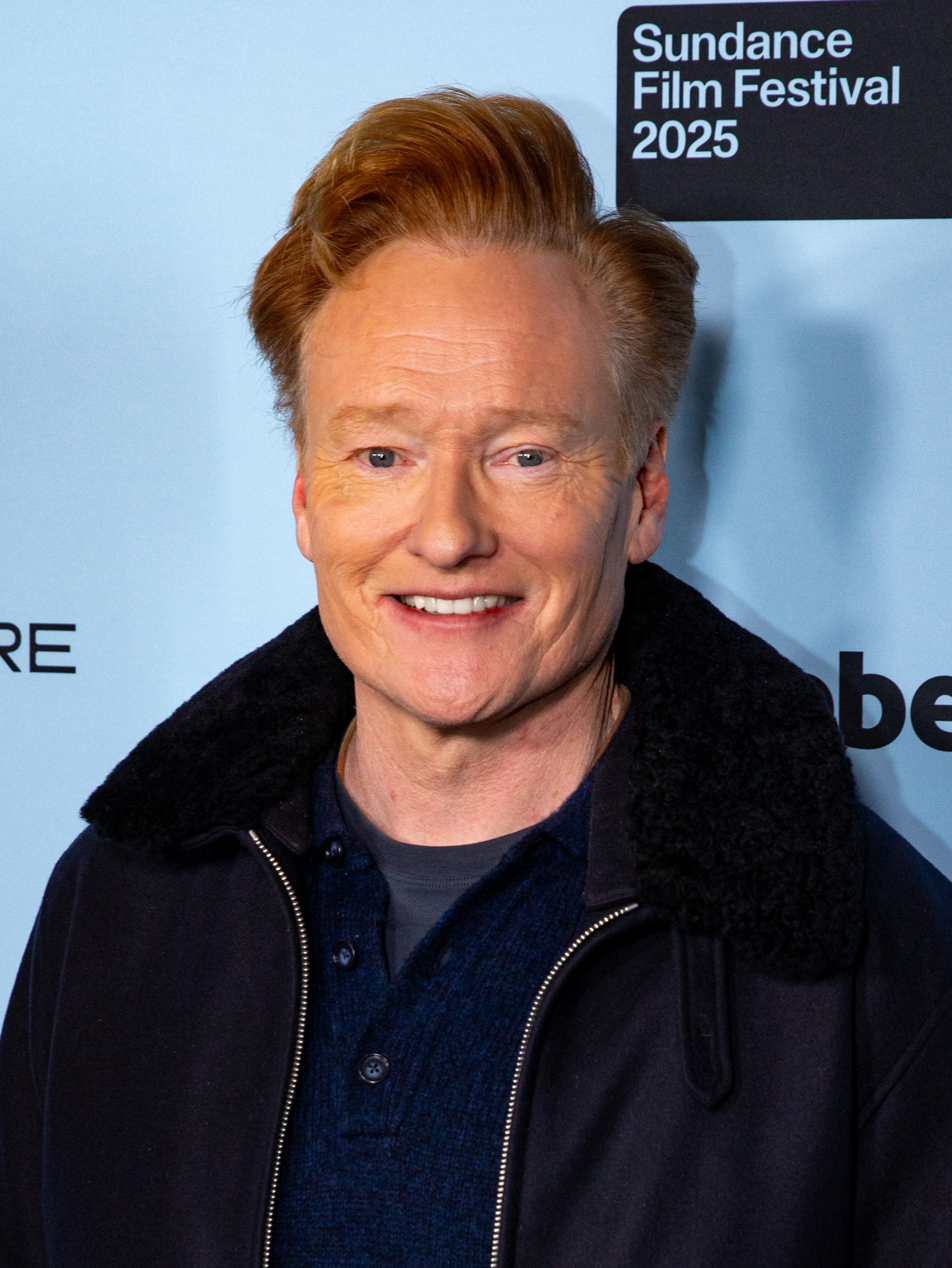
Conan O'Brien hosted the 97th Academy Awards.

In October 2024, the Academy hired television producers Raj Kapoor and Katy Mullan to oversee production of the ceremony for the second consecutive year. In a press release, AMPAS president Janet Yang and Academy CEO Bill Kramer explained their decision in selecting the pair, stating, "Their love for cinema, their collective creative vision, and their unparalleled expertise in live television make them the perfect team to create an exceptional show for our global audience on the film industry's biggest night." In response, Kapoor and Mullan released a statement, saying, "We are thrilled to lead the brilliant Oscars production team again and work alongside the Academy and Disney/ABC to help create an unforgettable night of television for movie lovers worldwide." The following month, comedian and former talk show host Conan O'Brien, who previously hosted two Primetime Emmy Awards telecasts in 2002 and 2006, was selected to host the 2025 gala. "Conan has all the qualities of a great Oscars host — he is incredibly witty, charismatic and funny and has proven himself to be a master of live event television," remarked producers Kapoor and Mullan regarding their choice for host. Previously, in July, it was reported that comedian and talk show host Jimmy Kimmel, who had hosted the ceremony four times prior, turned down an invitation to return, while comedian John Mulaney was also allegedly approached and declined.

The Southern California wildfires affected the telecast and its surrounding events. Voting for the nominations, which began on January 8, 2025, was originally planned to end four days later. However, due to the wildfires which affected several Academy members, the voting period was extended by five more days ending on January 17. The nominations announcement was also delayed nearly a week to January 23. In addition, the annual Academy nominees luncheon originally scheduled for February 10 was cancelled, and the Scientific and Technical Awards gala initially planned for February 18 was delayed by two months to April 29. At the start of the broadcast, a montage paying tribute to Los Angeles featuring clips from films such as Barbie (2023), Everything Everywhere All at Once (2022), La La Land (2016), Mulholland Drive (2001), and The Wizard of Oz (1939) was shown prior to Ariana Grande's performance of "Over the Rainbow". During the broadcast, a QR code was displayed providing a link containing resources for fire relief efforts. Later, host O'Brien brought onstage a group of twelve firefighters and other first responders and thanked them for their service during wildfires. Three of those members, Los Angeles Fire Department (LAFD) captain Erik Scott, LAFD helicopter pilot Jonith Johnson Jr., and Pasadena Fire Department Captain Jodi Slicker, delivered jokes onstage to the audience due to O'Brien jokingly claiming, "There are some jokes even I'm not brave enough to tell."

For the first time, the broadcast was made available for streaming live on Hulu. The simulcast on said streaming platform was notably met with technical issues such as crashing multiple times throughout the ceremony and prematurely ending the stream just before the Best Actress nominees were announced; Hulu apologized the following day.

Notable changes were introduced in the production of the telecast. In a break from previous presentations, the awards for Best Cinematography and Best Costume Design were presented by five actors, one of whom was featured in each of the nominated films in the category. The format was similar to how the acting awards were presented at the 81st and 96th ceremonies in 2009 and 2024, respectively. The Academy also announced that none of the five nominees for Best Original Song would be performed live during the gala. In lieu of the performances, each of the nominated songs was highlighted through personal reflections and behind-the-scenes insight from the creative teams responsible for the nominees.

Several others participated in the production of the ceremony and related events. Jeff Ross and Mike Sweeney, who previously worked on O'Brien's talk shows, were brought on as co-producers. Musician Michael Bearden was the musical director for the telecast. Production designers Alana Billingsley and Misty Buckley designed a new stage for the show. Comedian and journalist Amelia Dimoldenberg served as the social media and red carpet correspondent for the Oscars' online outlets for the second year in a row. Choreographer Mandy Moore oversaw the James Bond musical tribute which featured performances from Lisa, Doja Cat, and Raye, and an appearance in the beginning by actress and dancer Margaret Qualley.

=== Best Picture theatrical qualification and other rule changes ===
In June 2023, the Academy announced that, starting with the 97th awards, all films submitted for Best Picture would have to comply with several standards regarding their theatrical runs. In a press release, AMPAS president Janet Yang and Academy CEO Bill Kramer said of the new standards, "In support of our mission to celebrate and honor the arts and sciences of moviemaking, it is our hope that this expanded theatrical footprint will increase the visibility of films worldwide and encourage audiences to experience our artform in a theatrical setting. Based on many conversations with industry partners, we feel that this evolution benefits film artists and movie lovers alike." Many media outlets pointed out that the new rules were drafted in response to the growing presence of streaming platforms such as Amazon Prime Video, Apple TV+, and Netflix submitting their films for awards consideration.

According to the new rules, in addition to the previous requirement where prospective films must play theatrically for a week in either Los Angeles, New York City, Chicago, the San Francisco Bay Area, Atlanta, or Miami, (Note: In April 2024, the Academy replaced Miami with Dallas as one of six cities where a film may debut to qualify for awards consideration by the Academy.) they also would have to be shown in an expanded seven-day theatrical run in 10 of the top 50 US markets. The expanded theatrical run would have to occur within 45 days after the film's initial release in the eligibility year, and can be shown in either consecutive or nonconsecutive days. For films released later in the calendar year with expansions after January 10, distributors would have to submit to AMPAS release plans for verification and the theatrical run would have to be completed no later than January 24. Non-American films could also have theatrical runs in two markets outside the US to be counted toward ten theatrical markets needed for consideration. However, these films would have to release in the top 15 international theatrical markets in addition to the film's country of origin.

Additional rule changes were also approved by the AMPAS Board of Governors in April 2024. Drive-in theaters, which were temporarily allowed as a venue to meet qualification and eligibility standards during the COVID-19 pandemic, would be no longer recognized as a method to fulfill requirements for consideration. In the Best Original Score category, up to three composers can receive individual statuettes if all composers contribute significantly to a film's musical score. Additionally, the shortlist for the aforementioned category would increase from fifteen to twenty films. For the screenplay awards, all films must submit a final shooting script to be eligible for consideration in either category. Animated feature films submitted for consideration in the Best International Feature Film category may also be eligible for the Best Animated Feature award provided they meet the rules outlined for both categories. Finally, recipients of the Irving G. Thalberg Memorial Award will now receive an Oscar statuette as opposed to a bust of Thalberg in previous years.

=== Box office performance of Best Picture nominees ===
When the nominations were announced, nine of the ten films nominated for Best Picture had earned a combined gross of $900 million at the American and Canadian box offices at the time. Wicked was the highest-grossing film among the Best Picture nominees with $466 million in domestic box office receipts. Dune: Part Two came in second with $283 million; this was followed by A Complete Unknown ($59 million), Conclave ($32 million), The Substance ($17 million), Anora ($15 million), The Brutalist ($6 million), Nickel Boys ($1.1 million), and I'm Still Here ($162,000). The box office figures for Emilia Pérez were unavailable due to distributor Netflix's policy of refusing to release such figures.

=== Critical reviews ===
Variety chief film critic Owen Gleiberman called the show "a brisk and elegantly executed piece of media stagecraft, successful in more ways than not. It was lavishly designed and purged of dead spots, and the winners were given the chance to reveal who they were, which is really the heart of the show." Columnist Brian Lowry of TheWrap commented, "The 97th Academy Awards largely mastered the delicate mechanics of that juggling act, acknowledging weightier matters — such as bringing out Los Angeles firefighters for an extended ovation — while seeking to provide a sense of playfulness, even silliness, courtesy of host Conan O'Brien." Television critic Judy Berman of Time praised O'Brien's hosting performance, writing, "Whenever O'Brien was onstage, balancing impish humor with a palpable love for movies and compassion for an industry where so many recently lost so much to the wildfires that ravaged Los Angeles, the ceremony felt light and loose." She concluded her remarks by stating, "Still, the best moments of this hosting gig were just Conan being Conan, letting the winners enjoy their spotlight and laughing at himself to make everyone else feel comfortable."

Kelly Lawler of USA Today reserved praise for O'Brien and the winners' speeches, but she wrote, "Inoffensive and somewhat bland, the 2025 Oscars lacked passion and fervor, or a distinctive hook that makes the ceremony more than just a generic recitation of winners." Television critic Daniel Fienberg of The Hollywood Reporter remarked, "I'm perfectly happy to pretend that this telecast was the show we deserved at this point in history, when everything feels so unstable. But maybe it was just an uneven mess. Who's to say?" He criticized several decisions such as dropping the performances of the Best Original Song nominees in favor of musical tributes to James Bond and Quincy Jones that contributed to the telecast's bloated runtime, but he commended O'Brien's hosting performance and called writing during the gala "impressively sharp". The Detroit News film critic Adam Graham commented, "Sunday night's Academy Awards telecast was severely lacking in the movie star razzle dazzle we look forward to on the broadcast. Coming at the end of a packed awards and entertainment season, it felt more like reheated leftovers than it did Hollywood's biggest night."

=== Ratings and reception ===
The American telecast on ABC drew in an average of 19.69 million people over its length, which was a 1% increase from the previous year's ceremony. The show also had 9.1% of households watching the ceremony based on Nielsen estimates, which was lower than the previous ceremony. In addition, it garnered a higher 18–49 demo rating with a 4.54 rating among viewers in that demographic. Ratings figures included those who watched the telecast on ABC, streamed it on Hulu, or viewed it on computers, tablets, and other digital devices. Its Live+7 rating was 20.283 million people, which made it the 17th highest rated primetime telecast in the United States in 2025, behind only sport events.

In July 2025, the broadcast was nominated for six awards at the 77th Primetime Emmy Awards and its corresponding Creative Arts Awards. Two months later, the ceremony won one of those nominations for Outstanding Production Design for a Variety Special (Production Designers: Alana Billingsley and Misty Buckley; Art Directors: John Zuiker and Margaux LaPresle).

== "In Memoriam" ==
The annual "In Memoriam" segment, presented by Morgan Freeman, featured the Los Angeles Master Chorale performing "Lacrimosa" from Requiem by Wolfgang Amadeus Mozart. The following individuals were honored during the tribute:

- Maggie Smith – actress
- Gena Rowlands – actress
- Dabney Coleman – actor
- Lourdes Portillo – documentary filmmaker
- Dick Pope – cinematographer
- Phyllis Dalton – costume designer
- David Seidler – writer
- Roger Corman – director, producer
- Jeff Baena – director, writer
- Dianne Crittenden – casting director
- Bob Newhart – actor
- Kris Kristofferson – actor, songwriter
- Marshall Brickman – director, writer
- Robert Laemmle – exhibitor
- M. Emmet Walsh – actor
- K. C. Fox – set decorator
- Anthea Sylbert – costume designer, producer
- Josh Welsh – executive
- John F. Burnett – film editor
- Fred Roos – producer
- Jeannie Epper – stunt performer
- Christopher Newman – production sound mixer
- Nancy St. John – visual effects supervisor
- Paula Weinstein – producer
- Teri Garr – actress
- Cheng Pei-pei – actress
- John Amos – actor
- Robert Towne – director, writer
- Bill Cobbs – actor
- Lisa Westcott – makeup artist
- Barry Michael Cooper – writer
- Leonard Engelman – makeup artist
- Bud S. Smith – film editor
- Lynda Obst – producer
- Adam Somner – assistant director
- Roger Pratt – cinematographer
- Charles Shyer – director, writer
- Joan Plowright – actress
- Anouk Aimée – actress
- Donald Sutherland – actor
- Leo Chaloukian – sound executive
- Albert S. Ruddy – producer
- Art Evans – actor
- Colin Chilvers – visual effects
- Jim Tauber – executive
- Richard M. Sherman – songwriter
- Jan A. P. Kaczmarek – composer
- Louis Gossett Jr. – actor
- Tim McGovern – visual effects supervisor
- Ray Chan – production designer
- Will Jennings – songwriter
- Jon Landau – producer
- Fumi Kitahara – publicist
- Shelley Duvall – actress
- David Lynch – director, writer
- James Earl Jones – actor
- Gene Hackman – actor

Prior to the start of the tribute, Freeman briefly eulogized Hackman. Later in the ceremony, Whoopi Goldberg and Oprah Winfrey introduced a musical tribute to Quincy Jones featuring Queen Latifah performing the song "Ease On down the Road" from The Wiz.

== See also ==
- List of submissions to the 97th Academy Awards for Best Animated Feature
- List of submissions to the 97th Academy Awards for Best Documentary Feature
- List of submissions to the 97th Academy Awards for Best International Feature Film
