= Golden Reel Awards 2024 =

Sound editing awards

72nd Golden Reel Awards
- Date: February 23, 2025
- Location: Wilshire Ebell Theatre; Los Angeles, California, U.S.
- Presented by: Motion Picture Sound Editors
- Hosted by: Patton Oswalt
- Most wins: Call of Duty: Black Ops 6 (2)
- Most nominations: Call of Duty: Black Ops 6; Deadpool & Wolverine; Dune: Part Two; The Penguin; Ripley (3)

The 72nd Golden Reel Awards, presented by the Motion Picture Sound Editors (MPSE), honored the best in sound editing for film, television, video games, and student film in 2024. The ceremony was held on February 23, 2025, at the Wilshire Ebell Theatre in Los Angeles.

The nominations were announced on January 6, 2025. The films Deadpool & Wolverine and Dune: Part Two, and the television series The Penguin and Ripley all led the nominations with three each.

Supervising sound editor and sound designer Greg Hedgepath will receive the Career Achievement Award, while American actor and filmmaker Kevin Costner will be honored with the Filmmaker Award.

Actor and comedian Patton Oswalt hosted the ceremony for the third consecutive year.

== Winners and nominees ==
The winners are listed first and in bold.

=== Film ===
Outstanding Achievement in Sound Editing – Feature Dialogue / ADR	Outstanding Achievement in Sound Editing – Feature Effects / Foley
**Saturday Night – David Butler, Will Files, Lee Gilmore (supervising sound editors), Helen Lutrell, Emma Present (dialogue editors)**; Alien: Romulus – Will Files, Lee Gilmore (supervising sound editors), Matt "Smokey" Cloud (sound editor), Polly McKinnon (supervising dialogue editor), David Butler, Ryan Cole, Jacob Riehle, Ailene Roberts (dialogue editors); A Complete Unknown – Donald Sylvester (supervising sound editor), Russell Farmarco, Anna MacKenzie, Robert Troy (dialogue editors); Deadpool & Wolverine – Craig Henighan (supervising sound editor), Emma Present (dialogue editor); Dune: Part Two – Martin Kwok (supervising dialogue editor), Ray Beentjes, Polly McKinnon, Stefanie Ng (dialogue editors), David Bach (adr editor), Alexis Feodoroff, Justin Webster (crowd editors); Wicked – John Marquis, Nancy Nugent Title (supervising sound editors), John C. Stuver (supervising dialogue editor), David Bach (dialogue editor)	**Dune: Part Two – Richard King (supervising sound editor), Dave Whitehead, Michael Babcock, Lee Gilmore, Randy Torres (sound designers), Brent Burge, Hayden Collow, Melanie Graham, Michael Mitchell, Jeff Sawyer, Matt Stutter, Chris Terhune (sound effects editors), Chris Flick (supervising foley editor), Willard Overstreet (foley editor), John Cucci, Dan O'Connell (foley artists)**; Alien: Romulus – Will Files, Lee Gilmore (supervising sound editors), Chris Terhune (sound designer), Luis Galdames, Dan Kenyon, Ken McGill, James Miller, Matt "Smokey" Cloud, Steve Neal (sound effects editors), Samuel Munoz, Lyndsey Schenk (foley editors), Jacob McNaughton, Noel Vought (foley artists); Deadpool & Wolverine – Ryan Cole, Craig Henighan (supervising sound editors), Samson Neslund, Eric A. Norris, Addison Teague (sound designers), Lee Gilmore, J.R. Grubbs (sound effects editors), Pete Persaud, Gina Wark (foley editors), Steve Baine (foley artist); Furiosa: A Mad Max Saga – Robert Mackenzie (supervising sound editor), Tom Heuzenroeder, Tara Webb (sound effects editors), Duncan Campbell, Adrian Medhurst (foley editors); Nosferatu – Damian Volpe (supervising sound editor), Michael Fentum, Damian Volpe (sound designers), Samir Foco, Mariusz Glabinski (sound effects editors), Heikki Kossi (foley supervisor), Joel Raabe (foley editor); September 5 – Frank Kruse (supervising sound editor and sound designer), Uwe Zillner (foley supervisor), Johanna Rellinghaus, Benedikt Uebe (foley editors), Uwe Zillner (foley artist)
Outstanding Achievement in Music Editing – Feature Motion Picture	Outstanding Achievement in Music Editing – Documentary
**Wicked – Catherine Wilson (supervising music editor), Robin Baynton (supervising vocal editor)**; Better Man – Timothy Ryan (supervising music editor), Craig Beckett, Lena Glikson, Cory Milano, Liam Moses, Joe E. Rand, Chris Scallan, Emily Rogers Swanson (music editors), Noah Hubbell, Anna Muehlichen (vocal editors); A Complete Unknown – Ted Caplan (supervising music editor), Maggie Talibart (music editor); Deadpool & Wolverine – Daniel DiPrima, Oliver Hug (music editors), Anele Onyekwere (scoring editor); Dune: Part Two – Clint Bennett, Ryan Rubin (supervising music editors), Joe E. Rand (music editor); Emilia Pérez – Maxence Dussère (lead music editor), Cécile Coutelier, Matthieu Lefèvre, Aristide Rosier (music editors)	**Music by John Williams – Ramiro Belgardt (supervising music editor), Christopher Barnett, Roy Waldspurger (music editors)**; Beatles '64 – John M. Davis (music editor); Elton John: Never Too Late – Michael Brake (music editor); The Greatest Night in Pop – Gavin Allingham (music editor); Jim Henson Idea Man – Ryan Rubin (supervising music editor)
Outstanding Achievement in Sound Editing – Feature Documentary	Outstanding Achievement in Sound Editing – Feature Animation
**The Blue Angels – Robert Stambler (supervising sound editor), Ryan "Sully" Sullivan (sound effects editor), Emma Present (dialogue editor)**; Dahomey – Nicolas Becker (supervising sound editor and sound designer), Sylvain Malbrant (sound editor), Maxime Saleix (dialogue editor), Gilles Marsalet (foley artist); Elton John: Never Too Late – Rob Getty, Richard Yawn (supervising sound editors), Mike Pipgras (sound editor); Music by John Williams – Christopher Barnett, Roy Waldspurger (supervising sound editors), Tim Farrell (sound effects editor), Dmitri Makarov (dialogue editor), Ramiro Belgardt (music editor); Super/Man: The Christopher Reeve Story – Greg Gettens (supervising sound editor), Will Chapman (sound designer), Claire Ellis (supervising dialogue editor), Olly Freemantle (foley editor), Zoe Freed (foley artist); Will & Harper – Zach Seivers (supervising sound editor), George Pereyra, Adam Parrish King (sound effects editors), Jared K. Neal (dialogue editor)	**The Wild Robot – Brian Chumney, Leff Lefferts (supervising sound editors), Randy Thom (sound designer), David Farmer, David Hughes, Jamey Scott (sound effects editors), Rich Quinn (dialogue editor), Malcolm Fife, Dee Selby (foley editors), Ronni Brown, Jana Vance (foley artists)**; Inside Out 2 – Coya Elliott (supervising sound editor), Ren Klyce (sound designer), David C. Hughes, Jonathon Stevens (sound effects editors), Cheryl Nardi (supervising dialogue editor), Dee Selby (supervising foley editor), Nicholas Docter (foley editor), Heikki Kossi, Shelley Roden (foley artists); The Lord of the Rings: The War of the Rohirrim – Brent Burge, Martin Kwok, Matt Stutter (supervising sound editors), David Farmer (sound designer), Hayden Collow, Alexis Feodoroff (sound effects editors), Dmitry Novikov (dialogue editor), Michael Donaldson, Craig Tomlinson (foley editors), Simon Riley (foley artist); Mufasa: The Lion King – Onnalee Blank (supervising sound editor), Harry Cohen, Paula Fairfield, Luke Gibleon, Jason W. Jennings (sound designers), Benjamin L. Cook, Katie Halliday, Ando Johnson, Michael Mitchell, Jessie Pariseau, Roland N. Thai (sound effects editors), Vanessa Lapato (supervising adr editor), Katy Wood (supervising dialogue editor), Pietu Korhonen (foley editor), John Cucci, Gary Hecker, Mike Horton, Heikki Kossi, Dan O'Connell (foley artists)
Outstanding Achievement in Sound Editing – Feature International
**Emilia Pérez – Aymeric Devoldère (supervising sound editor), Cyril Holtz (sound designer), Hortense Bailly (supervising dialogue editor), Carolina Santana (supervising adr editor), Antoine Swertvaegher (foley editor), Gregory Vincent (foley artist)**; The Girl with the Needle – Morten Pilegaard, Oskar Skriver (supervising sound editors), Christian Roed Dalsgaard (sound effects editor), Patrick Ghislain (foley editor), Julien Naudin (foley artist); The Goat Life – Vijaykumar Mahadevaiah, Resul Pookutty (supervising sound editors), Arun Rana (sound effects editor), Vijaykumar Mahadevaiah (foley editor), Andriy Ryzhov, Ruslan Shebistyi, Andriy Starikovskiy, Bogdan Zavarzin (foley artists); Kneecap – Brendan Rehill (supervising sound editor), Louise Burton (supervising dialogue editor), Damien Lynch (foley editor), Caoimhe Doyle, Emer O'Reilly (foley artists)

=== Broadcast media ===
Outstanding Achievement in Sound Editing – Broadcast Long Form Dialogue and ADR	Outstanding Achievement in Sound Editing – Broadcast Long Form Effects and Foley
**Shōgun: "Ladies of the Willow World" – Brian J. Armstrong (supervising sound editor), Damon Cohoon (sound editor), John Creed (dialogue editor), Ayako Yamauchi (adr editor) (FX)**; Lioness: "Beware the Old Soldier" – Danika Wikke (supervising sound editor), Thomas Boykin (dialogue editor), Ben Zales (music editor) (Paramount+); Masters of the Air: "Part Nine" – Jack Whittaker, Michael Minkler (supervising sound editors), Dave McMoyler (supervising dialogue/adr editor), Michele Perrone (supervising adr editor), Michael Hertlein (dialogue editor), Jim Brookshire, Bryan Parker (adr editor) (Apple TV+); The Penguin: "Cent'Anni" – Rich Bologna, Lawrence Zipf (supervising sound editors), Angela Organ (supervising adr editor), Tony Martinez (adr editor), Michael McMenomy (dialogue editor) (HBO Max); Ripley: "V Lucio" – Michael Feuser, Lawrence Zipf (supervising sound editors), Lawrence Zipf (sound designer), Lidia Tamplenizza (supervising adr editor), Michael McMenomy (dialogue editor) (Netflix); Slow Horses: "Hello Goodbye" – Joe Beal (supervising sound editor), Sophie Mapplebeck (adr editor), Duncan Price, Abbie Shaw (dialogue editors) (Apple TV+)	**Ripley: "III Sommerso" – Michael Feuser, Lawrence Zipf (supervising sound editors), Bill R. Dean, Angelo Palazzo, Lawrence Zipf (sound designers), Igor Nikolic (foley editor), David Forshee, Wyatt Sprague (sound effects editors), Matt Haasch (supervising foley editor), Sandra Fox, Steve Hammond, Goro Koyama, Andy Malcolm, Jay Peck (foley artists) (Netflix)**; House of the Dragon: "The Red Dragon and the Gold" – Alastair Sirkett (supervising sound editor), Paula Fairfield (sound designer), Martin Cantwell, Ruth Knight (sound effects editors), Mathias Schuster (foley editor), Rebecca Glover, Barnaby Smyth (foley artists) (HBO Max); The Lord of the Rings: The Rings of Power: "Doomed to Die" – Ben Barker, Glenn Freemantle (supervising sound editors), Emilie O'Connor (supervising dialogue editor), Paolo Pavesi (foley editor), Zoe Freed, Rebecca Heathcote (foley artists) (Amazon Prime); Masters of the Air: "Part Five" – Michael Minkler, Jack Whittaker (supervising sound editors), Luke Gibleon, Jeff Sawyer (sound designers), Zach Goheen, Paul B. Knox, Adam Kopald (sound effects editors), Dylan Tuomy-Wilhoit, Jeffrey Wilhoit (foley artists) (Apple TV+); The Penguin: "After Hours" – Rich Bologna, Lawrence Zipf (supervising sound editors), Diego Perez, Wyatt Sprague (sound effects editors), Matt Haasch (supervising foley editor), Gareth Rhys Jones (foley artist) (HBO Max); Shōgun: "Broken to the Fist" – Brian J. Armstrong (supervising sound editor), Benjamin L. Cook, James Gallivan (sound designers), Mark Hailstone (sound effects editor), Ken Cain (foley editor), Sanaa Kelley, Matt Salib (foley artists) (FX)
Outstanding Achievement in Sound Editing – Non-Theatrical Feature	Outstanding Achievement in Sound Editing – Non-Theatrical Animation
**Rebel Moon – Part Two: The Scargiver – Scott Hecker, Chuck Michael (supervising sound editors), Scott Hecker, Chuck Michael, Nick Interlandi, Bryan Jerden, Alexander Pugh, Andrew Vernon (sound effects designers), Greg ten Bosch, Brad Sokol (sound effects editor), Jessie Anne Spence (supervising dialogue/adr editor), Michael Hertlein, Arielle McGrail, Byron Wilson (dialogue/adr editors), Mark Pappas (supervising foley editor), Gary Hecker (supervising foley artist), Michael Broomberg, Mike Horton (foley artists) (Netflix)**; Atlas – Per Hallberg (supervising sound editor), Ann Scibelli (supervising sound designer), Eric A. Norris, Stephen P. Robinson, Jonathan Title (sound effects editors), Daniel Irwin (supervising adr editor), Laura Harris Atkinson, Taylor Jackson, John Stuver (dialogue editors), Willard J. Overstreet (supervising foley editor), Gary Hecker (supervising foley artist), Michael Horton (foley artist) (Netflix); Beverly Hills Cop: Axel F – Chris Diebold (supervising sound editor), Chris Diebold, Randy Torres (sound designers), Phil Barrie (sound effects editor), Susan Dawes (supervising dialogue editor), Jim Brookshire (dialogue editor), Sean Massey (supervising adr editor), Chelsea Body, Jenna Dalla Riva, Kevin Jung, Colton Maddigan (foley editors), Sandra Fox, Steve Hammond, Goro Koyama (foley artists) (Netflix); The Killer – Mark Stoeckinger (supervising sound editor), Gael Nicolas, Alan Rankin (sound designers) (Peacock); Música – Christopher Aud (supervising sound editor), Mitch Osias (sound effects editor), Eliza Pollack-Chalfant Zebert (supervising adr editor), Alyson Dee Moore, Christopher Moriana, Nancy Parker (foley artists) (Amazon Prime)	**Arcane: "The Dirt Under Your Nails" – Brad Beaumont, Eliot Connors (supervising sound editors), Stephen P. Robinson (sound effects editor), Alexander Temple (supervising music editor), Andrew Kierszenbaum, Sebastien Najand, Alex Seaver (music editors), PJ Pascual (foley editor), John Cucci, Dan O'Connell (foley artists) (Netflix)**; Invincible: "I Thought You Were Stronger" – Brad Meyer (supervising sound editor), Katie Jackson, Mia Perfetti, Natalia Saavedra Brychcy (sound effects editors), Logan Romjue (dialogue editor), Carol Ma (foley editor) (Amazon Prime); Justice League: Crisis on Infinite Earths: "Part Three" – Robert Hargreaves (supervising sound editor), Robert Hargreaves (sound designer), Mark Keatts (supervising dialogue editor), Patrick J. Foley, Michael Garcia (dialogue editors), Kelly Foley Downs (adr editor) (Warner Bros. Animation); Orion and the Dark – D.J. Lynch, Rob McIntyre (supervising sound editors), Jessey Drake, Jeff Halbert, Marc Schmidt (sound designers), Evan Dockter, Cat Gensler, Grace Stensland (sound effects editors), Jason Oliver (dialogue editor), Roberto D. Alegria (foley editor), Vincent Deng, Laura Macias (foley artists) (Netflix); Watchmen: "Chapter 1" – Devon Bowman, George Peters (supervising sound editors), Paul Menichini (sound designer), Mark A. Keatts (supervising dialogue editor), David M. Cowan, Kelly Foley Downs, Michael Garcia (dialogue editors), Jordan McClain (foley editor), Sanaa Kelley, Matt Salib (foley artists) (Studio Mir)
Outstanding Achievement in Sound Editing – Broadcast Short Form	Outstanding Achievement in Sound Editing – Broadcast Animation
**Earthsounds: "Australian Forests" – Kate Hopkins (supervising sound editor), Tom Mercer (sound effect editor), Ellie Bowler (foley editor), Rory Joseph (foley artist) (Apple TV+)**; Baby Reindeer: "Episode 7" – Matt Skelding (supervising sound editor), Tom Jenkins (sound designer), Milos Stojanovic (dialogue editor), Mathias Schuster (foley editor), Barnaby Smyth (foley artist) (Netflix); The Bear: "Doors" – Steve "Major" Giammaria (supervising sound editor), Jonathan Fuhrer, Matt Snedecor, Craig LoGiudice (sound effects editors), John Bowen (adr editor), Evan Benjamin (dialogue editor), Annie Taylor (foley editor), Leslie Bloome, Shaun Brennan (foley artists) (FX); Only Murders in the Building: "Blow Up" – Mathew Waters, Danika Wikke (supervising sound editors), Meredith Stacy (sound effects editor), Christopher Gomez (dialogue editor), Erika Koski (foley editor), Iris Dutour, Sanaa Kelley (foley artists) (Hulu); What We Do in the Shadows: "Come Out and Play" – Steffan Falesitch (supervising sound editor), David Barbee (sound effects editor), Mark Relyea (adr editor), Paul Bercovitch (dialogue editor), Sam C. Lewis (supervising foley editor), Lyndsey Schenk (foley editor), Adam DeCoster, Alex Ullrich (foley artists) (FX)	**Secret Level: "Warhammer 40,000: They Shall Know No Fear" – Brad North, Matt Yocum (supervising sound editors), Joseph Fraioli, Nolan McNaughton, Ryan Sullivan (sound designers), Chris Battaglia, Harry Cohen (sound effects editors), Matt Manselle, Matt Telsey (foley editors), Brian Straub (foley artist) (Amazon Prime)**; Jurassic World: Chaos Theory: "Into the Fog" – D.J. Lynch, Rob McIntyre (supervising sound editors), Adam Cioffi, Jeff Halbert (sound designers), Marc Schmidt (sound effects editor), Anna Adams (dialogue editor), Erika Koski (foley editor), Iris Dutour, Sanaa Kelley (foley artists) (Netflix); LEGO Star Wars: Rebuild the Galaxy: "Part Two" – Jeff King (supervising sound editor), Frank Rinella (supervising foley editor), Shaun Farley (foley editor), Margie O'Malley (foley artist) (Disney+); Star Trek: Prodigy: "The Devourer of All Things, Part II" – Otis Van Osten (supervising sound editor), Aran Tanchum (supervising foley editor), Matt Klimek (sound designer), Michael Wessner (dialogue editor), Vincent Guisetti (foley artist) (Netflix); Transformers: EarthSpark: "Judgment Day: Part 2" – Brad Meyer (supervising sound editor), Natalia Saavedra Brychcy, Mia Perfetti (sound effects editors), Christine Gamache (dialogue editor), Carol Ma (foley editor) (Nickelodeon); X-Men '97: "Fire Made Flesh" – Jonathan Greber (supervising sound editor), Kyrsten Mate (sound designer), Jonathon Stevens, David Acord, Cameron Barker (sound effects editors), Jeremy Molod (supervising foley editor) (Disney+)
Outstanding Achievement in Music Editing – Broadcast Long Form	Outstanding Achievement in Music Editing – Broadcast Short Form
**The Penguin: "Cent'Anni" – Ben Holiday (supervising music editor), Chad Birmingham, Luke Dennis (music editors) (HBO Max)**; Fallout: "The End" – Clint Bennet, Christopher Kaller (music editors) (Amazon Prime); The Lord of the Rings: The Rings of Power: "Doomed to Die" – Jason Smith (music editor) (Prime Video); Ripley: "VIII Narcissus" – Dan Evans Farkas, Ben Schor (music editors) (Netflix); Salem's Lot – Andrew Silver (supervising music editor), John Carbonara (music editor) (HBO Max); Slow Horses: "Returns" – Ben Smithers (music editor) (Apple TV+)	**Only Murders in the Building: "My Best Friend's Wedding" – Michah Liberman (music editor) (Hulu)**; Baby Reindeer: "Episode 1" – Jack Sugden (music editor) (Netflix); The Bear: "Doors" – Jason Lingle, Jeff Lingle (music editors) (FX); Shrinking: "Last Drink" – Richard Brown (music editor) (Apple TV+); We Are Lady Parts: "The Reason" – Andy Patterson (music editor) (Peacock)
Outstanding Achievement in Sound Editing – Non-Theatrical Documentary
**Apollo 13: Survival – Paul Darling (supervising sound editor), Sound Editor: Greg Gettens (sound editor), Olly Freemantle (foley editor), Rebecca Heathcote (foley artist) (Netflix)**; The Beach Boys – Jonathan Greber (supervising sound editor), David Chrastka (sound effects editor) (Disney+); Fly – Eli Cohn (supervising sound editor), Jack Sasner (sound effects editor), Ben Chesneau (dialogue editor) (National Geographic); Formula 1: Drive to Survive: "Forza Ferrari" – Nick Fry, Steve Speed (supervising sound editors), Doug Dreger, Adam King (sound supervisors), Tom Maclellan, James Spooner (sound designers) (Netflix); Jim Henson Idea Man – Daniel Timmons, Tony Volante (supervising sound editors), Jeremy S. Bloom (sound designer), Kelly Rodriguez (sound editor), Ian Cymore (dialogue editor) (Disney+); Steve! (Martin) A Documentary in 2 Pieces – Bob Edwards (supervising sound editor), Pete Horner (sound designer), Kim B. Christensen, Joel Raabe (sound effects editors) (Apple TV+)

=== Video games ===
Outstanding Achievement in Sound Editing – Game Dialogue / ADR	Outstanding Achievement in Music Editing – Game Music
**Call of Duty: Black Ops 6 – Jacob Harley, Jeremiah Sypult, Brian Tuey (audio lead), Ian Mika (audio director), Charles Deenen (supervising sound editor), Robert Jackson (supervising dialogue editor), Ryan Garigliano (senior audio artists), Jessica Arkoff, Socrates Ayala, Kelli Baffoni, Tom Boyd, Roman Fusco, Cesar Marenco, Kevin Patel, Brandon Roos, Ruge Sun, Dani Turner, Rob Weiss, Maggie Wolf (dialogue editors), Justin Moreh, Darrell Tung (audio artists)**; Batman: Arkham Shadow – Mark Camperell (supervising dialogue editor), Charlie Gondak, Daniel Khim, Austin Krier, Matthew Kulewicz, Amanda McDonnell, Ryan Ongaro, Kerri Shak (dialogue editors); Final Fantasy VII Rebirth – Rita Kedineoglu (audio director), Martín Gutiérrez (supervising dialogue editor), Alex Baghdassarian, Bryan Borders, Garrett Hernandez (dialogue editors); Star Wars Outlaws – Charles Pateman (lead voice designer), Alain Abbyad, Antoine Deseille, Oskar Hansson, Marla Kishimoto, Hanna Witulska (voice designers); Until Dawn – Nick Gratwick (supervising dialogue editor), Paola Velasquez (senior dialogue designer), Andrea Contino (dialogue designer), Damian O'Sullivan (dialogue editor)	**Star Wars Outlaws – Simon Koudriavtsev (audio director), Erik Jacobsson (senior music designer), Manu Bachet (music supervisor)**; Call of Duty: Black Ops 6 – Alex Hemlock, Jeremiah Sypult, Brian Tuey (audio directors), Charles Deenen (supervising sound editor), Brian DiDomenico, Jim Lordeman (music editors); Diablo IV: Vessel of Hatred – Kris Giampa (audio director), Derek Duke (music director), Ted Reedy (supervising music editor), Adam Burgess (senior music editor); Dragon Age: The Veilguard – Cody Behiel (audio director), Ron Dazo (supervising music editor), Steven Silvers, Morgan Fryer-McCulloch, Ben YJ Hung, Lauren Kott (music editors); Helldivers 2 – Keith Leary (music director), Scott Shoemaker (supervising music editor), Sonia Coronado, Collin Lewis (music editors)
Outstanding Achievement in Sound Editing – Game Effects / Foley
**Call of Duty: Black Ops 6 – Adam Boyd, Trevor Bresaw, Ian Mika, Jeremiah Sypult, Brian Tuey (audio directors), Charles Deenen (supervising sound editor), Collin Ayers, Jai Berger, Darren Blondin, John Drelick, Nick Martin, Kevin Sherwood (lead sound designers), Mark Camperell, Nick D'Amato, Tom David, James Evans, Daniel P. Francis, Luis Galdames, Nick Interlandi, Austin Krier, Jim Lecroy, James Miller, Garrett Montgomery, Josh Moore, Michael Newton, Dominik Ragančík, Jordan Ruhala, Matthew Schaff, Nick Spradlin, Darrell Tung, Bryan O. Watkins (sound designers), Sunglae Park, William Wise III (technical sound designers), Andy Bayless, Cameron Britton, Scott Eckert (expert sound designers), Jacob Harley (associate lead sound designer), Landen Belardes, Cadmus Blackwood, Tyler Windsor (sound effects editors), Corina Bello, Logan Byers, Ryan Garigliano, Jasmine Jia, James McCawley, Vadim Nuniyants, Tim Schlie, Lee Staples (senior audio artists), Tommy Lee, Justin Moreh (audio artists), Rustam Himadiiev (foley editor), Bogdan Zavarzin (foley artist), Adam Boyd, Trevor Bresaw, Ian Mika, Jeremiah Sypult, Brian Tuey (audio directors)**; Batman: Arkham Shadow – Haroon Piracha (technical sound designer), Jon Ruse (sound design lead), Tyler Hayden, Kyle Lammerding (sound designers), Ryan David Kull (senior audio designer), Julian Korzeniowsky (lead audio designer), Alex Stopher (audio programmer), Lee Banyard, Scott Gilmore, Ryan McSweeney, Travis Naas, Stefan Rutherford, Matthew Wright (audio designers); Helldivers 2 – Olliver Andersson (sound designer), Simon Gumbleton (senior technical sound design supervisor), Harvey Scott, Juuson Tolonen (senior sound designers), Joanna Fang (senior foley artist), Kristian Johannson (senior audio artist); LEGO Horizon Adventures – Simon Haines (senior audio programmer), Byron Bullock, Peter Hanson, David Philip (sound designers), Mark Hill (lead sound designer), Pablo Valverde Brañas (senior audio designer), Lucas Falcao (technical sound designer), Safar Bake, Danny Hey, Bryan Higa, Matteo Lupieri, Ash Read, Pete Reed, Harvey Scott (senior sound designers), Harry Boyce, Edward Ducan, Rose Evans, Lorenzo Piani, Ben Pickersgill (sound designers), Austin Creek, Nick Seaman (foley editors), Joanna Fang (senior foley artist); Star Wars Outlaws – Simon Koudriavtsev (audio director), Jacob Coles (lead audio designer), Joel Green, Adam Oakley, Simon Siegfried Klar (senior sound designers), Martin Weissberg (expert audio designer), David Kristian (audio artist)

=== Student film ===
Outstanding Achievement in Sound Editing – Student Film (Verna Fields Award)
- **Songbirds (Savannah College of Art and Design) – Eugenio Mirafuentes (supervising sound editor)**
  - At the Riverbank (Chapman University) – Adam Jamal (supervising sound editor)
  - Brigham Young University: Student Accomplice (Brigham Young University) – Chance Anderson (supervising sound editor)
  - Bubble Boy (National Film and Television School) – Alina Ushakova (supervising sound editor)
  - Intermission (National Film and Television School) – Joseph Russell (supervising sound editor)
  - Last Remembrances (University of Southern California) – Sean Foster, Borna Moinpour (supervising sound editors)
  - The Memories of Autumn (Beijing Film Academy) – Xiaotong Fu, Ruijia Sun (supervising sound editors)
  - Wrestle-Off (University of Southern California) – Arden Sarner (supervising sound editor)
