= 20th César Awards =

Annual film award

- Date: 25 February 1995
- Site: Palais des Congrès, Paris, France
- Hosted by: Jean-Claude Brialy and Pierre Tchernia

Highlights
- Best Film: Wild Reeds
- Best Actor: Gérard Lanvin
- Best Actress: Isabelle Adjani

Television coverage
- Network: Canal+

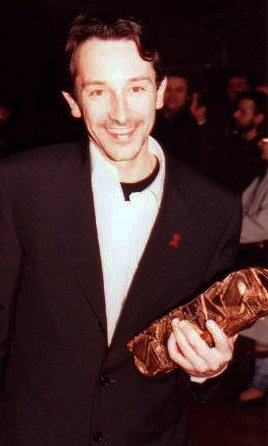
Jean-Hugues Anglade

The 20th César Awards ceremony, presented by the Académie des Arts et Techniques du Cinéma, honoured the best French films of 1994 and took place on 25 February 1995 at the Palais des Congrès in Paris. The ceremony was chaired by Alain Delon and hosted by Jean-Claude Brialy and Pierre Tchernia. Wild Reeds won the award for Best Film.

== Winners and nominees ==
The winners are highlighted in bold:

- Best Film:
  **Wild Reeds**, directed by André Téchiné
  Le Fils préféré, directed by Nicole Garcia
  Léon, directed by Luc Besson
  La Reine Margot, directed by Patrice Chéreau
  Trois Couleurs: Rouge, directed by Krzysztof Kieślowski
- Best Foreign Film:
  **Four Weddings and a Funeral**, directed by Mike Newell
  Caro diario, directed by Nanni Moretti
  Pulp Fiction, directed by Quentin Tarantino
  Schindler's List, directed by Steven Spielberg
  Short Cuts, directed by Robert Altman
- Best Debut:
  **Regarde les hommes tomber**, directed by Jacques Audiard
  Le Colonel Chabert, directed by Yves Angelo
  Mina Tannenbaum, directed by Martine Dugowson
  Personne ne m'aime, directed by Marion Vernoux
  Petits arrangements avec les morts, directed by Pascale Ferran
- Best Actor:
  **Gérard Lanvin**, for Le Fils préféré
  Gérard Depardieu, for Le Colonel Chabert
  Jean Reno, for Léon
  Daniel Auteuil, for La Séparation
  Jean-Louis Trintignant, for Trois Couleurs: Rouge
- Best Actress:
  **Isabelle Adjani**, for La Reine Margot
  Sandrine Bonnaire, for Jeanne la Pucelle II - Les prisons
  Anémone, for Pas très catholique
  Isabelle Huppert, for La Séparation
  Irène Jacob, for Trois Couleurs: Rouge
- Best Supporting Actor:
  **Jean-Hugues Anglade**, for La Reine Margot
  Fabrice Luchini, for Le Colonel Chabert
  Claude Rich, for La Fille de d'Artagnan
  Bernard Giraudeau, for Le Fils préféré
  Daniel Russo, for Neuf mois
- Best Supporting Actress:
  **Virna Lisi**, for La Reine Margot
  Line Renaud, for J'ai pas sommeil
  Catherine Jacob, for Neuf mois
  Dominique Blanc, for La Reine Margot
  Michèle Moretti, for Les Roseaux sauvages
- Most Promising Actor:
  **Mathieu Kassovitz**, for Regarde les hommes tomber
  Charles Berling, for Petits arrangements avec les morts
  Frédéric Gorny, for Les Roseaux sauvages
  Gaël Morel, for Les Roseaux sauvages
  Stéphane Rideau, for Les Roseaux sauvages
- Most Promising Actress:
  **Élodie Bouchez**, for Les Roseaux sauvages
  Marie Bunel, for Couples et amants
  Virginie Ledoyen, for L'Eau froide
  Elsa Zylberstein, for Mina Tannenbaum
  Sandrine Kiberlain, for Les Patriotes
- Best Director:
  **André Téchiné**, for Les Roseaux sauvages
  Nicole Garcia, for Le Fils préféré
  Luc Besson, for Léon
  Patrice Chéreau, for La Reine Margot
  Krzysztof Kieślowski, for Trois Couleurs: Rouge
- Best Original Screenplay or Adaptation:
  **André Téchiné, Gilles Taurand, Olivier Massart**, for Les Roseaux sauvages
  Michel Blanc, for Grosse fatigue
  Jacques Audiard, Alain Le Henry, for Regarde les hommes tomber
  Patrice Chéreau, Danièle Thompson, for La Reine Margot
  Krzysztof Kieślowski, Krzysztof Piesiewicz, for Trois Couleurs: Rouge
- Best Cinematography:
  **Philippe Rousselot**, for La Reine Margot
  Bernard Lutic, for Le Colonel Chabert
  Thierry Arbogast, for Léon
- Best Costume Design:
  **Moidele Bickel**, for La Reine Margot
  Franca Squarciapino, for Le Colonel Chabert
  Anne de Laugardière, Olga Berluti, for Farinelli
- Best Sound:
  **Jean-Paul Mugel, Dominique Hennequin**, for Farinelli
  François Groult, Pierre Excoffier, Gérard Lamps, Bruno Tarrière, for Léon
  William Flageollet, Jean-Claude Laureux, for Trois Couleurs: Rouge
- Best Editing:
  **Juliette Welfling**, for Regarde les hommes tomber
  Sylvie Landra, for Léon
  François Gédigier, Hélène Viard, for La Reine Margot
- Best Music:
  **Zbigniew Preisner**, for Trois Couleurs: Rouge
  Philippe Sarde, for La Fille de d'Artagnan
  Éric Serra, for Léon
  Goran Bregović, for La Reine Margot
- Best Production Design:
  **Gianni Quaranta**, for Farinelli
  Bernard Vézat, for Le Colonel Chabert
  Richard Peduzzi, Olivier Radot, for La Reine Margot
- Best Animated Short:
  **Elles**, directed by Joanna Quinn
  **Ex-memoriam**, directed by Beriou
- Best Short Film:
  **La Vis**, directed by Didier Flamand
  Deus ex Machnia, directed by Vincent Mayrand
  Emilie Muller, directed by Yvon Marciano
- Best Documentary Film:
  **Caught in the Acts (Délits flagrants)**, directed by Raymond Depardon
  Bosna!, directed by Bernard-Henri Lévy
  Montand, directed by Jean Labib
  Tsahal, directed by Claude Lanzmann
  The Righteous (Tzedek - les justes), directed by Marek Hafter
  Veillées d'armes, directed by Marcel Ophüls
  La Véritable histoire d'Artaud le momo, directed by Gérard Mordillat, Jérôme Prieur
- Honorary César:
  **Jeanne Moreau**
  **Gregory Peck**
  **Steven Spielberg**
- César des Césars:
  **Cyrano de Bergerac**, directed by Jean-Paul Rappeneau

== See also ==
- 67th Academy Awards
- 48th British Academy Film Awards
