= Maxence Dussère =

French composer and sound editor

- Occupations: Composer, sound editor

Maxence Dussère is a French composer and sound editor. He was nominated for an Academy Award in the category Best Sound for the film Emilia Pérez.

== Selected filmography ==
- Emilia Pérez (2024; co-nominated with Erwan Kerzanet, Aymeric Devoldère, Cyril Holtz and Niels Barletta)
