= Flageollet =

Flageollet is a surname. Notable people with the surname include:

- Denis Flageollet (born 1962), French watchmaker
- William Flageollet (1945–2019), French sound engineer
