= César Award for Best Sound =

Award

- Country: France
- Presented by: Académie des Arts et Techniques du Cinéma
- First award: 1976
- Currently held by: Romain Cadilhac, Marc Namblard, Olivier Touche and Olivier Goinard for Whispers in the Woods (2026)
- Website: academie-cinema.org

The César Award for Best Sound (French: César du meilleur son) is an award presented annually by the Académie des Arts et Techniques du Cinéma since 1976.

== Winners and nominees ==
=== 1970s ===
Year	English title	Original title	Sound editor(s)
1976	Black Moon		Nara Kollery and Luc Perini
1976	Hu-Man		Harald Maury and Harrik Maury
1976	India Song		Michel Vionnet
1976	Le Vieux Fusil		Bernard Aubouy
1977	Mado		Jean-Pierre Ruh
1977	Barocco		Paul Lainé
1977	The Best Way to Walk	La Meilleure Façon de marcher	Paul Lainé
1977	Je t'aime moi non plus		Antoine Bonfanti
1977	Monsieur Klein		Jean Labussiere
1978	Providence		René Magnol and Jacques Maumont
1978	Peppermint Soda	Diabolo menthe	Bernard Aubouy
1978	This Sweet Sickness	Dites-lui que je l'aime	Paul Lainé
1978	Fang and Claw	La Griffe et la dent	François Bel and Pierre Ley
1978	Madame Rosa	La Vie devant soi	Jean-Pierre Ruh
1979	The Savage State	L'État sauvage	William-Robert Sivel
1979	Judith Therpauve		Harald Maury
1979	Molière		Alix Comte
1979	A Simple Story	Une histoire simple	Pierre Lenoir

=== 1980s ===
Year	English title	Original title	Sound editor(s)
1980	Womanlight	Clair de femme	Pierre Gamet
1980	Martin and Lea	Martin et Léa	Alain Lachassagne
1980	Perceval le Gallois		Jean-Pierre Ruh
1980	Return to the Beloved	Retour à la bien-aimée	Pierre Lenoir
1981	The Last Metro	Le Dernier Métro	Michel Laurent
1981	The Lady Banker	La Banquière	Jean-Pierre Ruh
1981	A Bad Son	Un mauvais fils	Pierre Lenoir
1981	Death Watch	La Mort en direct	Michel Desrois
1982	Diva		Jean-Pierre Ruh
1982	Garde à Vue		Paul Lainé
1982	Malevil		Pierre Gamet
1982	Les Uns et les Autres		Harald Maury
1983	The Passerby	La Passante du Sans-Souci	William-Robert Sivel and Claude Villand
1983	Danton		Jean-Pierre Ruh
1983	The Roaring Forties	Les Quarantièmes rugissants	Pierre Gamet and Jacques Maumont
1983	Une chambre en ville		André Hervée
1984	So Long, Stooge	Tchao Pantin	Jean Labussiere and Gérard Lamps
1984	L'Argent		Jean-Louis Ughetto
1984	Waiter!	Garçon!	Pierre Lenoir and Jacques Maumont
1984	Deadly Circuit	Mortelle Randonnée	Maurice Gilbert, Paul Lainé and Nadine Muse
1985	Carmen		Dominique Hennequin, Guy Level and Harald Maury
1985	L'Amour à mort		Pierre Gamet and Jacques Maumont
1985	Fort Saganne		Pierre Gamet, Jean-Paul Loublier and Claude Villand
1985	Souvenirs, Souvenirs		Bernard Le Roux, Guillaume Sciama and Claude Villand
1986	Subway		Gérard Lamps, Harald Maury, Harrik Maury and Luc Perini
1986	An Impudent Girl	L'Effrontée	Paul Lainé and Gérard Lamps
1986	Rendez-vous		Dominique Hennequin and Jean-Louis Ughetto
1986	Harem		Pierre Gamet and Dominique Hennequin
1987	Round Midnight	Autour de minuit	Michel Desrois, William Flageollet, Bernard Le Roux and Claude Villand
1987	Thérèse		Dominique Dalmasso and Alain Lachassagne
1987	Jean de Florette		Pierre Gamet, Dominique Hennequin and Laurent Quaglio
1987	Tenue de soirée		Bernard Bats and Dominique Hennequin
1988	Au revoir les enfants		Jean-Claude Laureux, Bernard Le Roux and Claude Villand
1988	A Man in Love	Un homme amoureux	Bernard Bats and Gérard Lamps
1988	Les Innocents		Dominique Hennequin and Jean-Louis Ughetto
1989	The Big Blue	Le Grand Bleu	Pierre Befve, François Groult and Gérard Lamps
1989	Camille Claudel		François Groult, Dominique Hennequin and Guillaume Sciama
1989	The Bear	L'Ours	Bernard Le Roux, Laurent Quaglio and Claude Villand

=== 1990s ===
Year	English title	Original title	Sound editor(s)
1990	Monsieur Hire		Dominique Hennequin and Pierre Lenoir
1990	Bunker Palace Hôtel		Pierre Gamet and Claude Villand
1990	Life and Nothing But	La Vie et rien d'autre	Michel Desrois, William Flageollet and Gérard Lamps
1991	Cyrano de Bergerac		Pierre Gamet and Dominique Hennequin
1991	La Femme Nikita	Nikita	Michel Barlier, Pierre Befve and Gérard Lamps
1991	Nouvelle Vague		P.A. Besse, Henri Morelle and François Musy
1992	All the Mornings of the World	Tous les matins du monde	Pierre Gamet, Gérard Lamps, Anne le Campion and Pierre Verany
1992	Delicatessen		Vincent Arnardi and Jérôme Thiault
1992	Van Gogh		Jean-Pierre Duret and François Groult
1993	Indochine		Dominique Hennequin and Guillaume Sciama
1993	The Accompanist	L'Accompagnatrice	Paul Lainé and Gérard Lamps
1993	A Heart in Winter	Un cœur en hiver	Pierre Lenoir and Jean-Paul Loublier
1994	Three Colors: Blue	Trois couleurs: Bleu	William Flageollet and Jean-Claude Laureux
1994	Germinal		Pierre Gamet and Dominique Hennequin
1994	Smoking/No Smoking		Bernard Bats and Gérard Lamps
1995	Farinelli		Dominique Hennequin and Jean-Paul Mugel
1995	Léon		Pierre Excoffier, François Groult, Gérard Lamps and Bruno Tarrière
1995	Three Colors: Red	Trois Couleurs : Rouge	William Flageollet and Jean-Claude Laureux
1996	The Horseman on the Roof	Le Hussard sur le toit	Pierre Gamet, Jean Goudier and Dominique Hennequin
1996	La Haine		Dominique Dalmasso and Vincent Tulli
1996	Nelly and Mr. Arnaud	Nelly et Monsieur Arnaud	Pierre Lenoir and Jean-Paul Loublier
1997	Microcosmos	Microcosmos: Le peuple de l'herbe	Philippe Barbeau, Bernard Le Roux and Laurent Quaglio
1997	Ridicule		Jean Goudier, Dominique Hennequin and Paul Lainé
1997	Capitaine Conan		Michel Desrois and Gérard Lamps
1998	Same Old Song	On connaît la chanson	Michel Klochendler, Jean-Pierre Laforce and Pierre Lenoir
1998	The Fifth Element	Le Cinquième Élément	Daniel Brisseau
1998	Le Cousin		Pierre Gamet and Gérard Lamps
1999	Taxi		Vincent Arnardi and Vincent Tulli
1999	Those Who Love Me Can Take the Train	Ceux qui m'aiment prendront le train	Jean-Pierre Laforce, Nadine Muse and Guillaume Sciama
1999	Place Vendôme		Jean-Pierre Duret and Dominique Hennequin

=== 2000s ===
Year	Winner and nominees	Original title	Sound editor(s)
2000	The Messenger: The Story of Joan of Arc	Jeanne d'Arc	François Groult, Bruno Tarrière and Vincent Tulli
2000	The Children of the Marshland	Les Enfants du marais	William Flageollet and Guillaume Sciama
2000	Girl on the Bridge	La Fille sur le pont	Dominique Hennequin and Paul Lainé
2001	Harry, He's Here to Help	Harry, un ami qui vous veut du bien	Gérard Hardy, Gérard Lamps and François Maurel
2001	The Crimson Rivers	Les rivières pourpres	Cyril Holtz and Vincent Tulli
2001	The King Is Dancing	Le roi danse	Dominique Dalmasso and Henri Morelle
2002	Read My Lips	Sur mes lèvres	Cyril Holtz and Pascal Villard
2002	Amélie	Le fabuleux destin d'Amélie Poulain	Vincent Arnardi, Gérard Hardy and Jean Umansky
2002	Brotherhood of the Wolf	Le pacte des loups	Cyril Holtz and Jean-Paul Mugel
2003	The Pianist		Jean-Marie Blondel, Gérard Hardy and Dean Humphreys
2003	8 Women	8 femmes	Pierre Gamet, Benoît Hillebrant and Jean-Pierre Laforce
2003	Amen.		Dominique Gaborieau and Pierre Gamet
2004	Not on the Lips	Pas sur la bouche	Jean-Marie Blondel, Gérard Hardy and Gérard Lamps
2004	Bon voyage		Pierre Gamet, Jean Goudier and Dominique Hennequin
2004	Strayed	Les égarés	Olivier Goinard, Jean-Pierre Laforce, Jean-Paul Mugel
2005	The Chorus	Les choristes	Nicolas Cantin, Nicolas Naegelen and Daniel Sobrino
2005	Department 36	36 Quai des Orfèvres	Pierre Mertens, François Maurel, Sylvain Lasseur, Joël Rangon
2005	A Very Long Engagement	Un long dimanche de fiançailles	Vincent Arnardi, Gérard Hardy and Jean Umansky
2006	March of the Penguins	La marche de l'empereur	Laurent Quaglio and Gérard Lamps
2006	The Beat That My Heart Skipped	De battre mon cœur s'est arrêté	Philippe Amouroux, Cyril Holtz, Brigitte Taillandier and Pascal Villard
2006	Gabrielle		Olivier Dô Hùu, Benoît Hillebrant and Guillaume Sciama
2007	When I Was a Singer	Quand j'étais chanteur	Gabriel Hafner and François Musy
2007	Days of Glory	Indigènes	Olivier Hespel, Olivier Walczak, Franck Rubio and Thomas Gauder
2007	Lady Chatterley		Jean-Jacques Ferran, Nicolas Moreau and Jean-Pierre Laforce
2007	Private Fears in Public Places	Cœurs	Jean-Marie Blondel, Thomas Desjonquères and Gérard Lamps
2007	Tell No One	Ne le dis à personne	Pierre Gamand, Jean Goudier and Gérard Lamps
2008	La Vie en Rose	La môme	Laurent Zeilig, Pascal Villard, Jean-Paul Hurier and Marc Doisne
2008	Love Songs	Les Chansons d'amour	Guillaume Le Braz, Valérie Deloof, Agnès Ravez and Thierry Delor
2008	The Diving Bell and the Butterfly	Le Scaphandre et le papillon	Jean-Paul Mugel, Francis Wargniez and Dominique Gaborieau
2008	Persepolis		Thierry Lebon, Eric Chevallier and Samy Bardet
2008	Intimate Enemies	L'Ennemi Intime	Antoine Deflandre, Germain Boulay and Eric Tisserand
2009	Public Enemy Number One: Part 1 and 2	L'Instinct de mort and L'Ennemi public n°1	Jean Minondo, Gérard Hardy, Alexandre Widmer, Loïc Prian, François Groult and Hervé Buirette
2009	A Christmas Tale	Un conte de Noël	Jean-Pierre Laforce, Nicolas Cantin and Sylvain Malbrant
2009	The Class	Entre les murs	Olivier Mauvezin, Agnès Ravez and Jean-Pierre Laforce
2009	Paris 36	Faubourg 36	Daniel Sobrino, Roman Dymny and Vincent Goujon
2009	Séraphine		Philippe Vandendriessche, Emmanuel Croset and Ingrid Ralet

=== 2010s ===
Year	Winner and nominees	Original title	Sound editor(s)
2010	Le Concert		Pierre Excoffier, Bruno Tarriere and Selim Azzazi
2010	Welcome		Pierre Mertens, Laurent Quaglio and Éric Tisserand
2010	In the Beginning	À l'origine	Francois Musy and Gabriel Hafner
2010	A Prophet	Un prophète	Brigitte Taillandier, Francis Wargnier and Jean-Paul Hurier
2010	Micmacs	Micmacs à tire-larigot	Jean Umansky, Gerard Hardy and Vincent Arnardi
2011	Gainsbourg: A Heroic Life	Gainsbourg (Vie héroïque)	Daniel Sobrino, Jean Goudier and Cyril Holtz
2011	Oceans	Océans	Philippe Barbeau, Jérôme Wiciak and Florent Lavallée
2011	The Ghost Writer		Jean-Marie Blondel, Thomas Desjonquieres and Dean Humphreys
2011	Of Gods and Men	Des hommes et des dieux	Jean-Jacques Ferran, Vincent Guillon and Éric Bonnard
2011	On Tour	Tournée	Olivier Mauvezin, Séverin Favriau and Stéphane Thiebaut
2012	The Minister	L'Exercice de l'État	Olivier Hespel, Julie Brenta and Jean-Pierre Laforce
2012	The Intouchables	Intouchables	Pascal Armant, Jean Goudier and Jean-Paul Hurier
2012	House of Tolerance	L'Apollonide: Souvenirs de la maison close	Jean-Pierre Duret, Nicolas Moreau and Jean-Pierre Laforce
2012	Polisse		Nicolas Provost, Rym Debbarh-Mounir and Emmanuel Croset
2012	Declaration of War	La Guerre est déclarée	André Rigaut, Sébastien Savine and Laurent Gabiot
2013	My Way	Cloclo	Antoine Deflandre, Germain Boulay and Éric Tisserand
2013	Holy Motors		Erwan Kerzanet, Josefina Rodriguez and Emmanuel Croset
2013	Amour		Guillaume Sciama, Nadine Muse and Jean-Pierre Laforce
2013	Rust and Bone	De rouille et d'os	Brigitte Taillandier, Pascal Villard and Jean-Paul Hurier
2013	Farewell, My Queen	Les Adieux à la reine	Brigitte Taillandier, Francis Wargnier and Olivier Goinard
2014	Age of Uprising: The Legend of Michael Kohlhaas	Michael Kohlhaas	Jean-Pierre Duret, Jean Mallet and Melissa Petitjean
2014	Venus in Fur	La Vénus à la fourrure	Lucien Balibar, Cyril Holtz and Nadine Muse
2014	Me, Myself and Mum	Les Garçons et Guillaume, à table!	Marc-Antoine Beldent, Olivier Dô Hùu and Loic Prian
2014	Blue Is the Warmest Colour	La Vie d'Adèle – Chapitres 1 & 2	Jerome Chenevoy, Jean-Paul Hurier and Fabien Pochet
2014	Stranger by the Lake	L'Inconnu du lac	Philippe Grivel and Nathalie Vidal
2015	Timbuktu		Philippe Welsh, Roman Dymny and Thierry Delor
2015	Girlhood	Bande de filles	Pierre André and Daniel Sobrino
2015	Bird People		Jean-Jacques Ferran, Nicolas Moreau and Jean-Pierre Laforce
2015	Love at First Fight	Les Combattants	Jean-Luc Audy, Guillaume Bouchateau and Niels Barletta
2015	Saint Laurent		Nicolas Cantin, Nicolas Moreau and Jean-Pierre Laforce
2016	Marguerite		François Musy and Gabriel Hafner
2016	Dheepan		Daniel Sobrino, Valérie Deloof and Cyril Holtz
2016	Mon roi		Nicolas Provost, Agnès Ravez and Emmanuel Croset
2016	Mustang		Ibrahim Gök, Damien Guillaume and Olivier Goinard
2016	My Golden Days	Trois souvenirs de ma jeunesse	Nicolas Cantin, Sylvain Malbrant and Stéphane Thiébaut
2017	The Odyssey	L'Odyssée	Marc Engels, Fred Demolder, Sylvain Réty and Jean-Paul Hurier
2017	Chocolat		Brigitte Taillandier, Vincent Guillon and Stéphane Thiébaut
2017	Elle		Jean-Paul Mugel, Alexis Place, Cyril Holtz and Damien Lazzerini
2017	Frantz		Martin Boissau, Benoît Gargonne and Jean-Paul Hurier
2017	From the Land of the Moon	Mal de pierres	Jean-Pierre Duret, Sylvain Malbrant and Jean-Pierre Laforce
2018 (43rd)	Barbara		Olivier Mauvezin, Nicolas Moreau & Stéphane Thiébaut
2018 (43rd)	BPM (Beats per Minute)	120 battements par minute	Julien Sicart, Valérie Deloof & Jean-Pierre Laforce
2018 (43rd)	See You Up There	Au revoir là-haut	Jean Minondo, Gurwal Coïc-Gallas, Cyril Holtz and Damien Lazzerini
2018 (43rd)	Raw	Grave	Mathieu Descamps, Séverin Favriau & Stéphane Thiébaut
2018 (43rd)	C'est la vie!	Le Sens de la fête	Pascal Armant, Sélim Azzazi & Jean-Paul Hurier
2019 (44th)	The Sisters Brothers	Les Frères Sisters	Cyril Holtz
2019 (44th)	Custody	Jusqu'à la garde	Julien Roig, Julien Sicart, Vincent Verdoux
2019 (44th)	Sink or Swim	Le Grand Bain	Gwennolé Le Borgne
2019 (44th)	Guy		Antoine Baudouin, Yves-Marie Omnes
2019 (44th)	Memoir of War	La Douleur	Antoine Mercier, David Vranken, Aline Gavroy

=== 2020s ===
Year	Winner and nominees	Original title	Sound editor(s)
2020 (45th)	The Wolf's Call	Le Chant du loup	Nicolas Cantin, Thomas Desjonquères, Raphaëll Mouterde, Olivier Goinard and Randy Thom
2020 (45th)	La Belle Époque		Rémi Daru, Séverin Favriau and Jean-Paul Hurier
2020 (45th)	An Officer and a Spy	J'accuse	Lucien Balibar, Aymeric Devoldère, Cyril Holtz and Niels Barletta
2020 (45th)	Les Misérables		Arnaud Lavaleix, Jérôme Gonthier and Marco Casanova
2020 (45th)	Portrait of a Lady on Fire	Portrait de la jeune fille en feu	Julien Sicart, Valérie de Loof and Daniel Sobrino
2021 (46th)	Adolescents	Adolescentes	Yolande Decarsin, Jeanne Delplancq, Fanny Martin and Olivier Goinard
2021 (46th)	Bye Bye Morons	Adieu les cons	Jean Minondo, Gurwal Coïc-Gallas and Cyril Holtz
2021 (46th)	My Donkey, My Lover & I	Antoinette dans les Cévennes	Guillaume Valex, Fred Demolder and Jean-Paul Hurier
2021 (46th)	Love Affair(s)	Les Choses qu'on dit, les choses qu'on fait	Maxime Gavaudan, François Mereu and Jean-Paul Hurier
2021 (46th)	Summer of 85	Été 85	Brigitte Taillandier, Julien Roig and Jean-Paul Hurier
2022 (47th)	Annette		Erwan Kerzanet, Katia Boutin, Maxence Dussère, Paul Heymans and Thomas Gauder
2022 (47th)	Aline		Olivier Mauvezin, Arnaud Rolland, Edouard Morin and Daniel Sobrino
2022 (47th)	Black Box	Boîte noire	Nicolas Provost, Nicolas Bouvet-Levrard and Marc Doisne
2022 (47th)	Lost Illusions	Illusions perdues	François Musy, Renaud Musy and Didier Lozahic
2022 (47th)	Magnetic Beats	Les magnétiques	Mathieu Descamps, Pierre Bariaud and Samuel Aïchoun
2023 (48th)	The Night of the 12th	La Nuit du 12	François Maurel, Olivier Mortier, Luc Thomas
2023 (48th)	The Innocent	L'Innocent	Laurent Benaim, Alexis Meynet, Olivier Guillaume
2023 (48th)	Pacifiction	Pacifiction – Tourment sur les îles	Jordi Ribas, Benjamin Laurent, Bruno Tarriere
2023 (48th)	November	Novembre	Cedric Deloche, Alexis Place, Gwennole Le Borgne, Marc Doisne
2023 (48th)	Rise	En corps	Cyril Moisson, Nicolas Moreau and Cyril Holtz
2024 (49th)	The Animal Kingdom	Le Règne animal	Fabrice Osinski, Raphaël Sohier, Matthieu Fichet and Niels Barletta
2024 (49th)	All Your Faces	Je verrai toujours vos visages	Rémi Daru, Guadalupe Cassius, Loïc Prian and Marc Doisne
2024 (49th)	Anatomy of a Fall	Anatomie d'une chute	Julien Sicart, Fanny Martin, Jeanne Delplancq and Olivier Goinard
2024 (49th)	The Goldman Case	Le Procès Goldman	Erwann Kerzanet, Sylvain Malbrant and Olivier Guillaume
2024 (49th)	The Three Musketeers: D'Artagnan and The Three Musketeers: Milady	Les Trois Mousquetaires: D'Artagnan / Les Trois Mousquetaires: Milady	David Rit, Gwennolé Le Borgne, Olivier Touche, Cyril Holtz and Niels Barletta
2025 (50th)
2025 (50th)	Emilia Pérez		Erwan Kerzanet, Aymeric Devoldère, Cyril Holtz and Niels Barletta
2025 (50th)	Beating Hearts	L'Amour ouf	Cédric Deloche, Gwennolé Le Borgne, Jon Goc and Marc Doisne
2025 (50th)	The Count of Monte Cristo	Le Comte de Monte-Cristo	David Rit, Gwennolé Le Borgne, Olivier Touche, Laure-Anne Darras, Marion Papinot, Marc Doisne and Samuel Delorme
2025 (50th)	The Marching Band	En Fanfare	Pascal Armant, Sandy Notarianni and Niels Barletta
2025 (50th)	Souleymane's Story	L'Histoire de Souleymane	Marc-Olivier Brullé, Pierre Bariaud, Charlotte Butrak and Samuel Aïchoun
2026 (51st)	Whispers in the Woods	Le chant des forêts	Romain Cadilhac, Marc Namblard, Olivier Touche and Olivier Goinard
2026 (51st)	Arco		Nicolas Becker, Andrea Ferrera and Damien Lazzerini
2026 (51st)	Case 137	Dossier 137	François Maurel, Rym Debbarh-Mounir and Nathalie Vidal
2026 (51st)	Leave One Day	Partir un jour	Rémi Chanaud, Jeanne Delplanco, Fanny Martin and Niels Barletta
2026 (51st)	Nouvelle Vague		Jean minondo, Serge Rouquairol and Christophe Vingtrinier

== See also ==
- Academy Award for Best Sound
- BAFTA Award for Best Sound
- European Film Award for Best Sound Designer
- Magritte Award for Best Sound
