= Vincent Tulli =

French sound designer

- Born: Vincent François Michel Tulli; 5 February 1966; Paris, France
- Occupations: Sound mixing Sound Designer; Sound recording
- Awards: Golden Reel Award for The Messenger: The Story of Joan of Arc (2000)

Vincent Tulli was born in Paris, 5 February 1966. He is a sound mixer and a sound designer. He is also an actor.

== Films ==
=== Sound department ===
- 1990: Fierrot le pou (Short) (by Mathieu Kassovitz)
- 1993: Empreintes (Documentary) (by Camille Guichard)
- 1995: A Mother's Battle (TV Series) (by Eric Woreth)
- 1995: La Haine (Hate) (by Mathieu Kassovitz)
- 1995: Confronting the Night (by Eric Woreth)
- 1996: L'Appartement (The Apartment) (by Gilles Mimouni)
- 1997: Shabbat night fever (Short) (by Vincent Cassel
- 1997: Le Milliardaire (Short) (by Julien Eudes)
- 1997: Assassin(s) (by Mathieu Kassovitz)
- 1997: A Woman Very Very Very Much in Love (by Ariel Zeitoun)
- 1997: XXL (by Ariel Zeitoun)
- 1998: Taxi (by Gérard Pirès)
- 1998: Charité biz'ness (de Thierry Barthes et Pierre Jamin)
- 1999: The Messenger: The Story of Joan of Arc (by Luc Besson)
- 2000: The Crimson Rivers (Short) (by Mathieu Kassovitz)
- 2000: D 907 (Short) (by Pascal Guérin)
- 2001: Kiss of the Dragon (by Chris Nahon)
- 2002: The Transporter (by Louis Leterrier)
- 2003: Silver moumoute (Short) (by Christophe Campos)
- 2003: Comme tu es (Short) (Véronique Séret)
- 2003: Ong-bak (by Prachya Pinkaew)
- 2003: Taxi 3 (Film) by Gérard Krawczyk
- 2003: Cheeky (Film), by David Thewlis
- 2004: Yes (by Sally Potter)
- 2005: Danny the Dog (by Louis Leterrier)
- 2005: It's Our Life! (Gérard Krawczyk)
- 2006: Paris, je t'aime (by Bruno Podalydès, Gurinder Chadha, Gus Van Sant, Joel Coen & Ethan Coen, Walter Salles, Christopher Doyle, Isabel Coixet, Nobuhiro Suwa, Sylvain Chomet, Alfonso Cuarón, Olivier Assayas, Oliver Schmitz, Richard LaGravenese, Vincenzo Natali, Wes Craven, Tom Tykwer, Gérard Depardieu, Alexander Payne.)
- 2006: No Body Is Perfect (by Raphaël Sibilla)
- 2007: Sur ma ligne (documentary) (de Rachid Djaidani)
- 2007: The Red Inn (Gérard Krawczyk)
- 2008: 8 (le segment "The story of Panshin Beka") (by Jan Kounen)
- 2009: Chanel & Stravinsky (by Jan Kounen)

=== Actor ===
- 1997: Une femme très très très amoureuse – Photographer
- 1997: XXL – Chauffeur
- 1999: The Messenger: The Story of Joan of Arc – Orleans' Physician
- 2000: The Crimson Rivers – Computer Technician
- 2002: The Transporter – Thug (uncredited)
- 2003: Taxi 3 – Policier Camionnette
- 2005: Unleashed – Dead Fighter (final film role)

== Award ==
- César Award 1995 : nominated César Award for Best Sound for La Haine (Hate)
- César Award 1999 : Won César Award for Best Sound for Taxi
- César Award 2000 : Won César Award for Best Sound for The Messenger: The Story of Joan of Arc
- César Award 2001 : nominated César Award for Best Sound for The Crimson Rivers
- Golden Reel Award 2000 (USA) Best Sound editing for The Messenger: The Story of Joan of Arc
