= François Musy =

Swiss-French sound engineer (1955–2023)

- Born: 6 October 1955; Geneva, Switzerland
- Died: 22 November 2023 (aged 68)
- Occupation: Sound engineer

François Musy (6 October 1955 – 22 November 2023) was a Swiss-French sound engineer. Musy died on 22 November 2023, at the age of 68.

== Filmography ==
- Passion (1982)
- First Name: Carmen (1983)
- Hail Mary (1985)
- Détective (1985)
- King Lear (1987)
- Power of the Speech (1988)
- Miss Missouri (1990)
- Nouvelle Vague (1990)
- Gaspard and Robinson (1990)
- Germany Year 90 Nine Zero (1991)
- Black for Remembrance (1995)
- In Praise of Love (2001)
- Eager Bodies (2003)
- When I Was a Singer (2006)
- In the Beginning (2009)
- Un soir au club (2009)
- Film Socialisme (2010)
- Beyond Suspicion (2010)
- Carré blanc (2011)
- Superstar (2012)
- Marguerite (2015)
- In the Shadow of Women (2015)
- The Woods Dreams Are Made Of (2016)
- Lost Illusions (2021)

== Awards ==
- Technical Prize at the 40th Venice International Film Festival for First Name: Carmen (1983)
- César Award for Best Sound for When I Was a Singer (2007)
- César Award for Best Sound for Marguerite (2016)
