= The Conquest (2011 film) =

- Film poster
- French: La conquête
- Directed by: Xavier Durringer
- Written by: Xavier Durringer; Patrick Rotman
- Produced by: Éric and Nicolas Altmayer
- Starring: Denis Podalydès; Florence Pernel; Bernard Le Coq; Michèle Moretti
- Cinematography: Gilles Porte
- Edited by: Catherine Schwartz
- Music by: Nicola Piovani
- Production companies: Gaumont; Mandarin Cinéma; Canal+ CinéCinéma
- Distributed by: Gaumont
- Release date: 18 May 2011
- Running time: 105 minutes
- Country: France
- Language: French
- Budget: $5.6 million
- Box office: $6.3 million

The Conquest (French: La conquête) is a 2011 French biographical comedy-drama film on Nicolas Sarkozy directed by Xavier Durringer.

== Plot ==
On 6 May 2007, Nicolas Sarkozy, between two phone calls to his wife Cécilia, remembers the past five years. In 2002, he returned to the forefront of political life by being appointed interior minister by President of the Republic, Jacques Chirac, in the government of Jean-Pierre Raffarin. Gradually, he managed to make a name and decided to prepare to succeed President Chirac at the Elysee in 2007. However, he must cope with significant challenges as his rivalry with the Foreign Minister, Dominique de Villepin, or the secret romance with Cecilia advertising Richard Attias and his affair with the journalist Anne Fulda.

== Cast ==
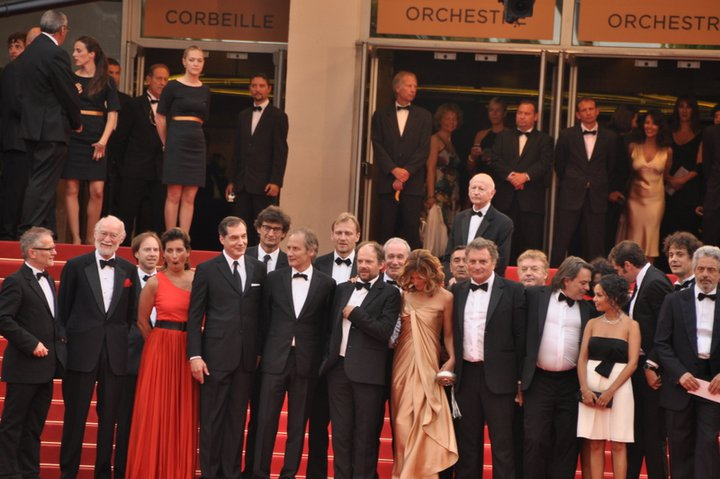
The film crew at the 2011 Cannes Film Festival

- Denis Podalydès as Nicolas Sarkozy
- Florence Pernel as Cécilia Sarkozy
- Bernard Le Coq as Jacques Chirac
- Michèle Moretti as Bernadette Chirac
- Hippolyte Girardot as Claude Guéant
- Samuel Labarthe as Dominique de Villepin
- Emmanuel Noblet as Bruno Le Maire
- Pierre Cassignard as Frédéric Lefebvre
- Michel Bompoil as Henri Guaino
- Saïda Jawad as Rachida Dati
- Gérard Chaillou as Jean-Louis Debré
- Yann Babilée as Richard Attias
- Laurent Claret as Philippe Rondot
- Dominique Daguier as Jean-Louis Gergorin
- Grégory Fitoussi as Laurent Solly
- Dominique Besnehard as Pierre Charon
- Nicolas Moreau as Pierre Giacometti
- Jérémie Fontaine as Louis Sarkozy
- Mathias Mlekuz as Franck Louvrier
- Fabrice Cals as Michaël Darmon
- Laurent Olmedo as Philippe Ridet
- Bruno López as Jean-François Achilli
- Jean-Pierre Léonardini as Bruno Jeudy
- Marine Royer as Delphine Byrka
- Monica Abularach as Elodie Grégoire

== Production ==
The movie was presented the same day of its release date to the 2011 Cannes Film Festival, on May 18, 2011.

It was filmed in different locations like: Estadio Centenario, Ex Aeropuerto de Carrasco, Montevideo Uruguay among others.

== Critical reception ==
The movie was well received by the critics. As of June 2020, the film holds a 77% approval rating on review aggregator Rotten Tomatoes, based on 31 reviews with an average rating of 6.4 out of 10. Metacritic gave the film a score of 62 out of 100, based on 14 critics.

== Accolades ==
Award	Category	Recipient	Result
César Award	César Award for Best Actor	Denis Podalydès	Nominated
César Award	César Award for Best Supporting Actor	Bernard Le Coq	Nominated
