= Denis Flageollet =

French independent watchmaker

Denis Flageollet (born 1962) is a French watchmaker and co-founder of the independent watch manufacture De Bethune, where he serves as both technical and artistic director. He is credited with the invention of several mechanical devices used in contemporary watchmaking and is actively involved in efforts to preserve and transmit horological craftsmanship.

== Early life and work ==
Denis Flageollet represents the fourth-generation of a family of watchmakers from Gérardmer, in the Vosges département in northeastern France. He studied watchmaking and micromechanics at the Technicum du Locle in Switzerland and began his professional career restoring historical timepieces at the Watch Museum of Le Locle.

In 1982, Flageollet joined Michel Parmigiani's workshop, where he worked on the restoration of classic and complicated watches; there he also contributed to the development of an ultra-thin perpetual calendar movement for Breguet. By the second half of the 1980s, he was working independently as a watchmaker, carrying out restoration work and creating unique pieces.

In 1989, Flageollet co-founded Techniques Horlogères Appliquées (THA) in Sainte-Croix with François-Paul Journe; other watchmakers, including Vianney Halter and Dominique Mouret soon joined the venture. As the firm's technical and production director and head of R&D, he set up the production workshops and handled technical management. During his 12 years at THA, he worked on and supervised the firm's development and manufacturing of watch components, clocks, and calibers commissioned by watch brands and individual clients. Notably, he spearheaded the Monopoussoir CPCP monopusher chronograph for Cartier and the Breguet Sympathique No. 1 – a mantel clock that could wind, set, and regulate a docked wristwatch – for Breguet, among other projects.

In 2002, he co-founded De Bethune with collector David Zanetta.

== Technical contributions and research projects ==
Flageollet has developed several technical innovations in horology with the aim of improving precision, durability, and aesthetic harmony. Notable examples include a titanium balance wheel paired with an optimized hairspring (patented in 2004), a spherical moon phase display for wristwatches (2004), and a chronograph clutch system (2014).

In 2011, he initiated the "Résonique" project – a regulation system based on the physics principles of vibratory resonance at extremely high frequencies, without the use of a traditional escapement. Departing from the centuries-old mechanical convention of using an anchor and escape wheel, the system employs a magnetic rotor and silicon oscillator to achieve quartz-like precision. Flageollet released the results of his research and work as open-source to encourage broader collaboration across the watchmaking industry.

In 2022, Flageollet launched the Mecavers project, a large-scale mechanical construction conceived as an open-ended work integrating horological, astronomical, and artistic references. The project, representing the solar system, features 71 celestial bodies, including planets and associated satellites, set in motion by a complex network of gears. It showcases astronomical complications such as solstices, equinoxes, and the equation of time. Designed as both as an artistic creation and an educational instrument, Mecavers explores the relationship between traditional mechanical mastery and contemporary creative expression in horology. The project was also the subject of a documentary series by Olivier Ronot.

== Commitment to craft preservation ==
In 2014, Denis Flageollet was among the artisans consulted by the Swiss Federal Office of Culture for the candidacy of the mechanical watchmaking and art mechanics traditions of Sainte-Croix to UNESCO’s Representative List of the Intangible Cultural Heritage of Humanity. The nomination dossier was subsequently submitted in 2019, and the official inscription on the UNESCO list occurred in 2020.

In 2018, together with artisans François Junod and Nicolas Court, he co-founded the educational and vocational training initiative Secrets de Maîtres in Sainte-Croix, created to preserve and transmit the knowledge and crafts of horological and mechanical art. This program later evolved into the Mec-Art association, also co-founded by Flageollet in 2021.

In 2019, Flageollet, in his capacity as De Bethune’s creative and technical director, worked with ECAL (École cantonale d’art de Lausanne) to establish an annual award encouraging students in the school’s Master in Design for Luxury & Craftsmanship program to pursue careers in the applied arts and artisan crafts (métiers d’art).

In 2023, Denis Flageollet, in his role as co-founder and master watchmaker of De Bethune, oversaw the company’s acquisition of a majority stake in Sainte-Croix-based Manufacture Reuge SA, the historic maker of music boxes and automata founded in 1865, with the aim of preserving and revitalizing its mechanical-art tradition. That same year, Flageollet’s work within the Mec-Art association—which promotes and transmits the region’s horological and mechanical-art craftsmanship—contributed to the development of the Institut de la Mécanique d’Art (IMA) in Sainte-Croix, a center that, in addition to running the Secrets de Maîtres courses, hosts workshops, exhibitions, training activities, and research projects.

In 2024, Flageollet, through his involvement with the Mec-Art association, was involved in establishing the Maison de la Mécanique d’Art in Geneva, as a venue dedicated to exhibitions, talks, and events celebrating horology and mechanical-art craftsmanship; he also took part in the inaugural exhibition, Mechanical Marvels, which showcased creations of his own alongside collaborations between Sainte-Croix artisans and ECAL design students.

== Publications ==
=== Book ===
- Flageollet, Denis (2022). Horological alchemy. Lausanne (Suisse): Favre. ISBN 9782828920678.

=== Articles ===
- Denis Flageollet, "Un chronomètre à force constante (remontoir d'égalité) avec seconde morte et rattrapante," Horlogerie Ancienne, no. 13, Jan. 1983
- Denis Flageollet and Charles Meylan, "Transformation du calibre 13 Valjoux VZHCL no. 88 en quantième perpétuel," Chronométrophilia, Winter 1988
