= Nicolas Moreau =

French actor and a theatre director (born 1969)

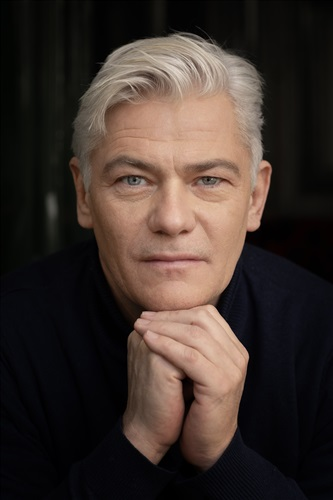
Nicolas Moreau

Nicolas Moreau (born 28 June 1969) is a French actor and a theatre director.

== Career ==
Moreau debuted in 1995 in four roles: as Marc, the son of Claude Jade and Georges Claisse in Jacques Richards' television movie Porté disparu; as Andreï in the adaption of Eduard von Keyserling's novel Été Brûlant with Claude Rich and Hélène de Fougerolles; in Denys de La Patellière's last film Maigret et l'affaire Saint-Fiacre (with Bruno Cremer and Claude Winter); and as Luc Béraud in Denys de La Patelliére's Pasteur, cinq années de rage with Bernard Fresson.

After many roles in television movies, he played the role of Émile Bernard in Roger Planchon's film Lautrec. His television career was followed by, among others, Le Bois du Pardoux (2000) with Annie Girardot and Thierry Chabert's Des jours et des nuits (2005).

Moreau returned to cinema in 2005 in Patrice Chéreau's Gabrielle.

In 2011 he played the role of Louis Eggenberger in Thierry Binisti's Marthe Richard aired on France 3 TV, and the role of Pierre Giacometti in Denis Podalydès's biopic on Sarkozy's rise to power: La conquête.

== Theatre work ==
In addition to and perhaps more noted than his cinema work have been his theatrical performances. These include

- 2010 : AMADEUS, LE CONCERT directed by John Axelrod, (role: Mozart), Orchestre National des Pays de la Loire
- 2009 : ONCLE VANIA directed by Patrick Haggiagh
- 2007 : A BOUT DE SOUFFLE directed by Thierry Niang
- 2006 : PETITS MEURTRES EN FAMILLE by François Roux (Role : Paul)
- 2004/2005 : ANGELE by Alexandre Dumas directed by Gilles Gleizes
- 2004 : LE PEEP SHOW THEATRE- Nicolas MOREAU, Jardins du théâtre du Rond Point
- 2003 : L'IMPROMPTU DE VERSAILLES
- 2002/2003 : DOM JUAN, Molière directed by Christophe Thiry
- 2001 : LA FEMME D'UN AUTRE (F. Dostoïevski) directed by Sava Lolov
- 2001: LE PETIT MAITRE CORRIGE, Marivaux directed by Frédéric Tokarz
- 2000: La Vie de Galilée-Bertolt Brecht, directed by Jacques Lassalle, Théâtre national de la Colline
- 1999 : LA MENAGERIE DE VERRE- T. Williams directed by Christophe Thiry
- 1998 : MESURE POUR MESURE -W. Shakespeare, directed by Claude Yersin
- 1997: Le Radeau de la Méduse by Roger Planchon, directed by the author, at the Théâtre national de la Colline
- 1996 : LA TOUR E NESLE - A. Dumas directed by Roger Planchon
- 1993 : MINETTI by T. Bernhard
- 1992 : RIEN QU'UN MORCEAU DE PAIN - R.W Fassbinder directed by Bruno Bayen
- 1991: La Dame de Pique - A. Pouchkine directed by Piotr Fomenko
- 1991: LES PRECIEUSES RIDICULES - Molière, Jean Luc Boutte, Comédie Française
- 1991: L'IMPROMPTU DE VERSAILLES - Molière, Jean Luc Boutte, Comédie Française
- 1990 : LORENZACCIO - Francis Huster By A. de Musset

== Filmography ==
- The Conquest- Xavier Durringer
- CAVALCADE- Steve Suissa
- GABRIELLE- Patrice Chereau
- GROENLAND- Muriel Breton
- LAUTREC - Roger Planchon
- LE REFUGE- François Ozon
- RETURN TO THE DOGS- Lodge Kerrigan
- TOUTES LES FILLES SONT FOLLES - Pascale POUZADOUX
- The Rendez-Vous of Déjà-Vu - Antonin Peretjatko

=== Television ===
- 2014 : 2 FLICS SUR LES DOCKS - EPISODE 7 - Edwin BAILY
- 2013 : Joséphine, ange gardien : Georges Lannier (1 Episode)
- 2012 :

DE PERE EN FILLE - Jean-Marc SEBAN

PROFILAGE - EPISODE 35, 36 - Julien DESPAUX

PROFILAGE - EPISODE 34 - Alexandre LAURENT

GRAND HOTEL - Benoit D'AUBERT RIS - Alain BRUNARD

LE SANG DE LA VIGNE - Marc RIVIERE Marthe RICHARD - Thierry Binisti

ANTIGONE 34 - Louis Pascal COUVELAIRE

ENGRENAGES- Manuel BOURSINAC et Jean-Marc BRONDOLO

UN FLIC - Patrick DEWOLF

SCALP - Xavier Durringer

LEA PARKER 2 - Olivier JAMAIN Episode Rebelle

LE GRAND PATRON- Christian BONNET

DES JOURS ET DES NUITS- Thierry CHABERT

LES MONTANA - Benoît D'AUBERT

NAVARRO - Patrick JAMAIN Episode Triste carnaval

LES BOIS DU PARDOUX - Stéphane KURC P.J NOYADE - Gérard VERGEZ

UN ANGE PASSE - Bertrand VAN EFFENTERRE

PASTEUR, CINQ ANNEES DE RAGE - Luc BERAUD

MAIGRET ''L'AFFAIRE SAINT FIACRE'' - Denys DE LA PATELLIERE

ETE BRULANT- Jérôme FOULON PORTE DISPARU- Jacques RICHARD C'ETAIT LA GUERRE - Maurice FAILEVIC

== Recognition ==
=== Awards and nominations ===
2007, nominated for a César Award 'Meilleur son' for Lady Chatterley

== Other sources ==
- Nicolas Moreau at the l’Internet Movie Database (in French)
- Nicolas Moreau at IMDb
