= Pierre Excoffier =

French audio engineer

Pierre Excoffier is a French audio engineer.

He won the César Award for Best Sound in 2010. He is also a teacher at La Fémis.

== Filmography ==
- 1994: Léon: The Professional
- 2002: Aram by Robert Kechichian
- 2002: Asterix & Obelix: Mission Cleopatra
- 2004: RRRrrrr!!!
- 2006: Cabaret Paradis
- 2009: Le Concert

== Nominations and distinctions ==
- Nominated for the César Award for Best Sound for Léon: The Professional by Luc Besson
- César Award for Best Sound for Le Concert at the 35th César Awards
