= Jacques Maumont =

French sound editor (1924–2006)

- Born: 29 September 1924
- Died: 13 April 2006 (aged 81)
- Other name: Jean Maumont
- Occupation: sound editor
- Years active: 1948-1987

Jacques Maumont (29 September 1924 – 13 April 2006) was a French sound editor who won at the 35th Academy Awards in the category of Best Special Effects. He won for his work on the film The Longest Day, for which he shared his win with Robert MacDonald. He worked on 140 films during his career.
