= William Flageollet =

French sound engineer (1945–2019)

William Portrait

William Flageollet (born 27 November 1945, Nancy; died 29 April 2019) was a French sound engineer in the music and film. He participated in mixing more than 120 films and directed the recording and mixing of hundreds of film scores. He was nominated several times for the César Award for Best Sound; he won it twice, in 1987 for Round Midnight, and in 1994 for Three Colors: Blue.
