= Niels Barletta =

French sound engineer

- Occupation: Sound engineer

Niels Barletta is a French sound engineer. He was nominated for an Academy Award in the category Best Sound for the film Emilia Pérez.

At the 50th César Awards, he won a César Award for Best Sound. His win was shared with Erwan Kerzanet, Aymeric Devoldère and Cyril Holtz.

== Biography ==
He studied film at the École nationale supérieure Louis-Lumière, in the sound department, and graduated in 2010.

== Selected filmography ==
- Emilia Pérez (2024)
