= Ted Caplan =

American sound editor

- Occupation: Sound editor

Ted Caplan is an American sound editor. He was nominated for an Academy Award in the category Best Sound for the film A Complete Unknown.

== Selected filmography ==
- A Complete Unknown (2024; co-nominated with Tod A. Maitland, Donald Sylvester, Paul Massey and David Giammarco)
