= Aymeric Devoldère =

French sound engineer

- Born: Aymeric Michel Gaston Devoldère
- Occupation: Sound engineer

Aymeric Michel Gaston Devoldère is a French sound engineer. He was nominated for an Academy Award in the category Best Sound for the film Emilia Pérez.

At the 50th César Awards, he won a César Award for Best Sound. His win was shared with Erwan Kerzanet, Cyril Holtz and Niels Barletta.

== Selected filmography ==
- Emilia Pérez (2024)
