= List of accolades received by Wicked (2024 film) =

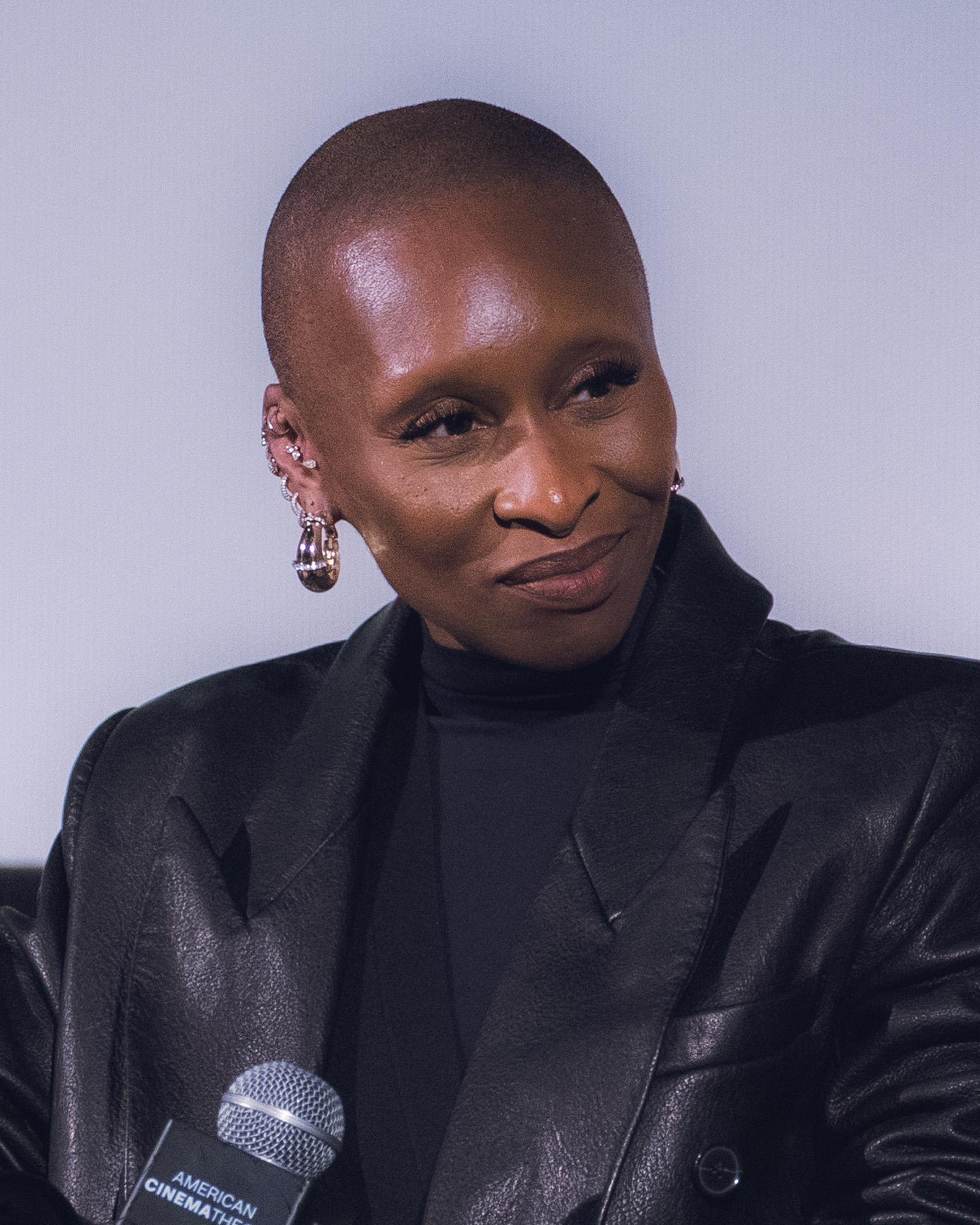
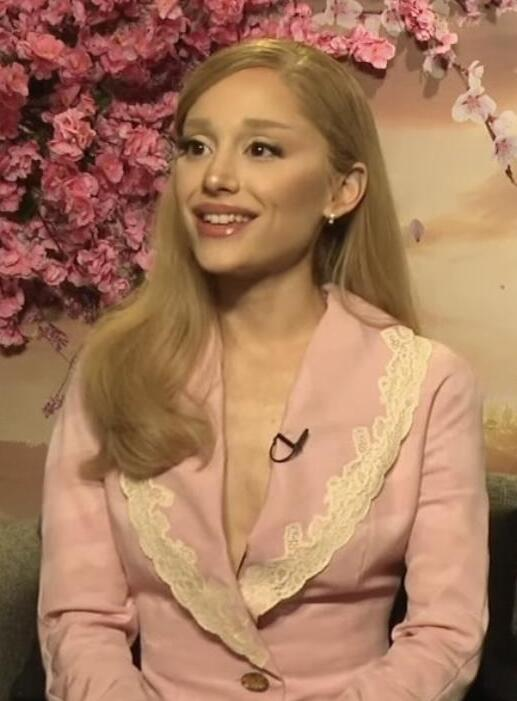
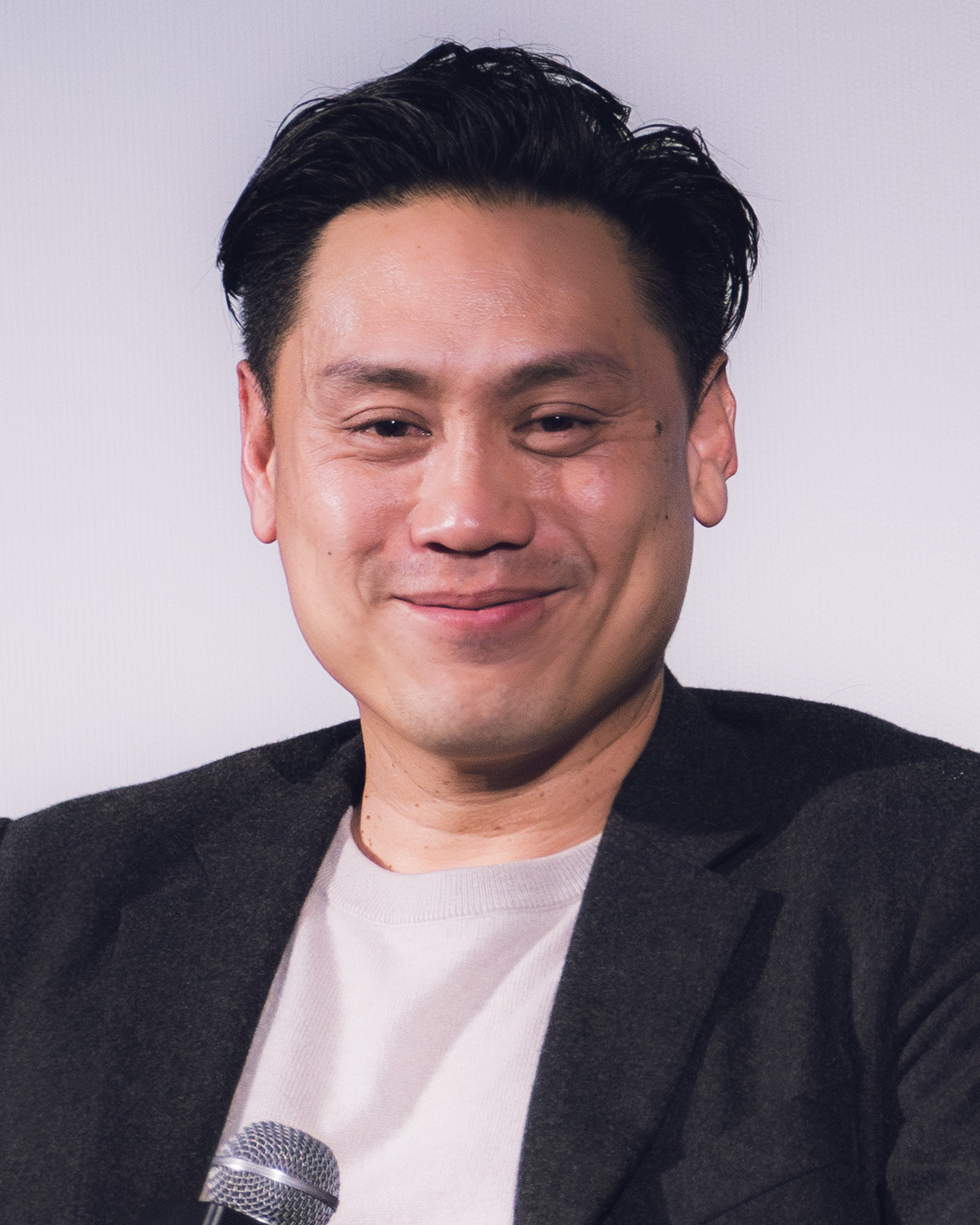
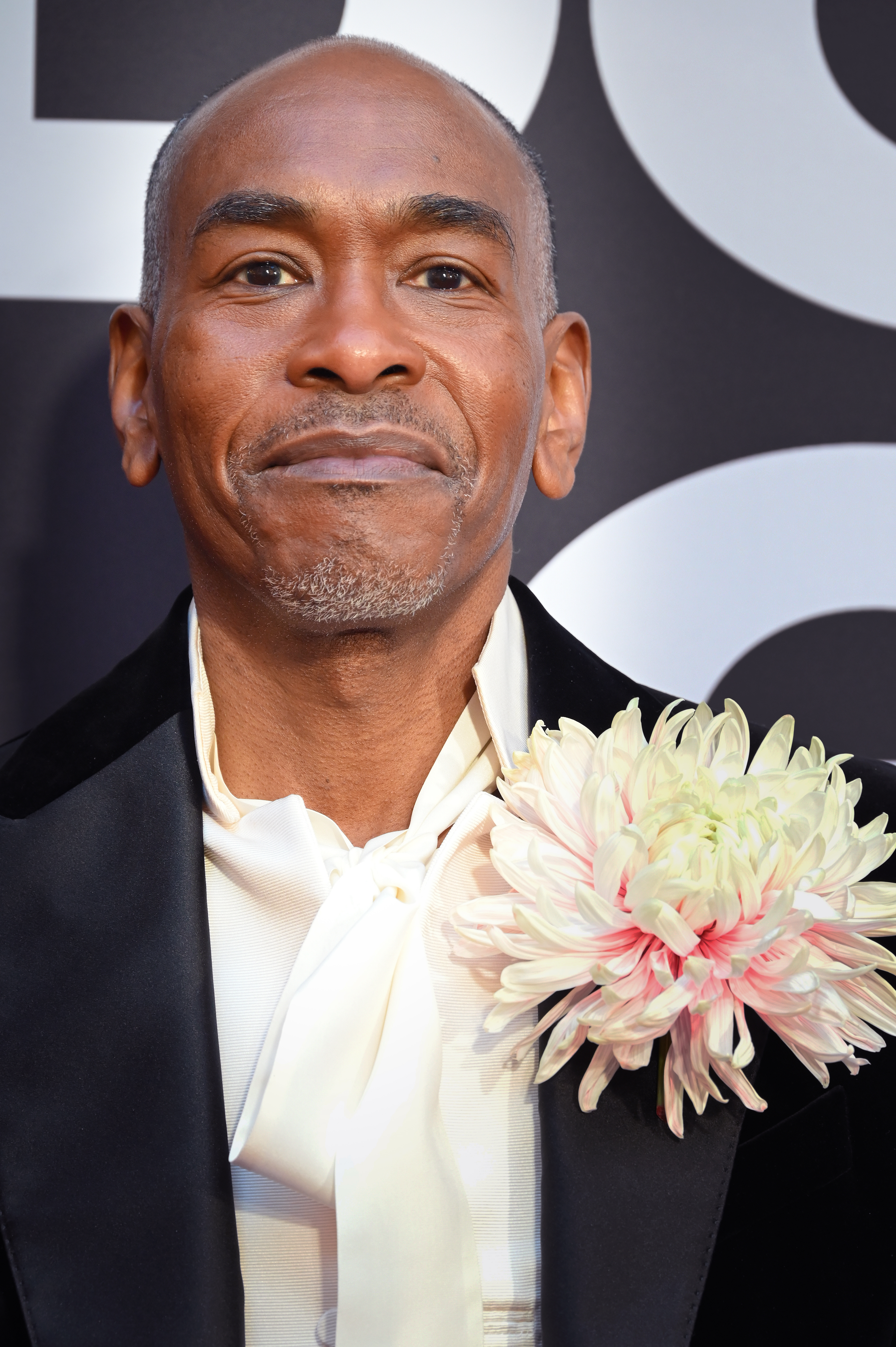
- From left to right: Cynthia Erivo and Ariana Grande received accolades for their performances as Elphaba Thropp and Galinda Upland, respectively, while Jon M. Chu was awarded for his direction, and Paul Tazewell earned honors for his costume design.
Accolades
| Award | Wins | Nominations |
| AACTA Awards | 0 | 1 |
| AARP Movies for Grownups Awards | 1 | 1 |
| Academy Awards | 2 | 10 |
| Alliance of Women Film Journalists | 2 | 4 |
| American Cinema Editors Awards | 1 | 1 |
| American Film Institute Awards | 1 | 1 |
| American Music Awards | 0 | 1 |
| Art Directors Guild Awards | 1 | 1 |
| Artios Awards | 1 | 1 |
| Astra Film and Creative Arts Awards | 8 | 20 |
| Austin Film Critics Association | 0 | 3 |
| BET Awards | 1 | 2 |
| Black Film Critics Circle | 1 | 1 |
| Black Reel Awards | 2 | 3 |
| Boston Online Film Critics Association | 1 | 1 |
| Brit Awards | 0 | 1 |
| British Academy Film Awards | 2 | 7 |
| Camerimage | 1 | 1 |
| Capri Hollywood International Film Festival | 1 | 1 |
| Celebration of Black Cinema and Television | 1 | 1 |
| Chicago Film Critics Association | 0 | 6 |
| Cinema Audio Society Awards | 0 | 1 |
| Costume Designers Guild Awards | 1 | 1 |
| Critics' Choice Movie Awards | 3 | 11 |
| Dallas–Fort Worth Film Critics Association | 2 | 2 |
| Dorian Awards | 3 | 7 |
| Georgia Film Critics Association | 0 | 6 |
| Golden Globe Awards | 1 | 4 |
| Golden Reel Awards | 1 | 3 |
| Grammy Awards | 1 | 4 |
| Guild of Music Supervisors Awards | 1 | 1 |
| Hollywood Music in Media Awards | 0 | 2 |
| Hugo Award | 0 | 1 |
| iHeartRadio Music Awards | 1 | 1 |
| Make-Up Artists and Hair Stylists Guild | 2 | 2 |
| NAACP Image Awards | 2 | 6 |
| National Board of Review | 3 | 3 |
| New York Film Critics Online | 0 | 6 |
| Nickelodeon Kids' Choice Awards | 3 | 8 |
| North Texas Film Critics Association | 0 | 4 |
| Online Film Critics Society | 1 | 8 |
| Palm Springs International Film Festival | 2 | 2 |
| Producers Guild of America Awards | 0 | 1 |
| San Diego Film Critics Society | 3 | 8 |
| San Francisco Bay Area Film Critics Circle | 0 | 2 |
| Santa Barbara International Film Festival | 1 | 1 |
| Satellite Awards | 4 | 8 |
| Saturn Awards | 1 | 1 |
| Screen Actors Guild Awards | 0 | 5 |
| Seattle Film Critics Society | 1 | 5 |
| Set Decorators Society of America | 1 | 1 |
| Society of Composers & Lyricists | 0 | 1 |
| Southeastern Film Critics Association | 2 | 2 |
| St. Louis Film Critics Association | 0 | 8 |
| Visual Effects Society Awards | 0 | 1 |
| Washington D.C. Area Film Critics Association | 2 | 8 |
| Writers Guild of America Awards | 0 | 1 |

Totals (Note: Certain award groups do not simply award one winner. They acknowledge several different recipients, have runners-up, and have third place. Since this is a specific recognition and is different from losing an award, runner-up mentions are considered wins in this award tally. For simplification and to avoid errors, each award in this list has been presumed to have had a prior nomination.)
- Wins: 76
- Nominations: 220

Wicked (Note: Titled on-screen as Wicked: Part I) is a 2024 American musical fantasy film directed by Jon M. Chu and written by Winnie Holzman and Dana Fox. It adapts the first act of the 2003 stage musical by Stephen Schwartz and Holzman, which was loosely based on Gregory Maguire's 1995 novel. A re-imagining of L. Frank Baum's The Wonderful Wizard of Oz and its 1939 film adaptation, the film stars Cynthia Erivo as Elphaba Thropp and Ariana Grande (Note: Grande is credited onscreen with her full name, "Ariana Grande-Butera".) as Galinda Upland. Set in the Land of Oz prior to Dorothy Gale's arrival from Kansas, its plot follows Elphaba, the future Wicked Witch of the West, and her friendship with her classmate Galinda, who becomes Glinda the Good. The ensemble supporting cast includes Jonathan Bailey, Ethan Slater, Bowen Yang, Marissa Bode, Peter Dinklage, Michelle Yeoh, and Jeff Goldblum.

Wicked had its world premiere at the State Theatre in Sydney on November 3, 2024, followed by the American premiere at the Dorothy Chandler Pavilion in Los Angeles on November 9. The film was released theatrically in the United States on November 22 through Universal Pictures. Produced on a $150 million budget, Wicked grossed $756 million worldwide, making it the highest grossing musical film adaptation of all time. Rotten Tomatoes, a review aggregator, surveyed 402 reviews and judged 88% to be positive.

Wicked garnered awards and nominations in a wide assortment of categories, with recognition for its direction, performances, music, costumes, and production design. At the 97th Academy Awards, the film received ten nominations, including Best Picture, winning Best Costume Design and Best Production Design. The film received four nominations at the 82nd Golden Globe Awards including for Best Motion Picture – Musical or Comedy, and it won for Cinematic and Box Office Achievement. At the 30th Critics' Choice Awards, Wicked tied with Conclave for a leading eleven nominations; Chu ultimately won Best Director, atop wins for Best Costume Design and Best Production Design. It garnered seven nominations at the 78th British Academy Film Awards and went on to win two awards for Best Costume Design and Best Production Design. Wicked was named one of the Top Ten Films of 2024 by the American Film Institute, and it won Best Film at the National Board of Review.

== Accolades ==
Wicked accolades
| Award | Date of ceremony | Category | Nominee(s) | Result | Ref. |
|---|---|---|---|---|---|
| AACTA International Awards | February 7, 2025 | Best Supporting Actress | Ariana Grande | Nominated | |
| AARP Movies for Grownups Awards | January 11, 2025 | Best Screenwriter | Winnie Holzman | Won | |
| Academy Awards | March 2, 2025 | Best Picture | Marc Platt | Nominated | |
| Academy Awards | March 2, 2025 | Best Actress | Cynthia Erivo | Nominated | |
| Academy Awards | March 2, 2025 | Best Supporting Actress | Ariana Grande | Nominated | |
| Academy Awards | March 2, 2025 | Best Costume Design | Paul Tazewell | Won | |
| Academy Awards | March 2, 2025 | Best Film Editing | Myron Kerstein | Nominated | |
| Academy Awards | March 2, 2025 | Best Makeup and Hairstyling | Frances Hannon, Laura Blount, and Sarah Nuth | Nominated | |
| Academy Awards | March 2, 2025 | Best Production Design | Nathan Crowley and Lee Sandales | Won | |
| Academy Awards | March 2, 2025 | Best Original Score | John Powell and Stephen Schwartz | Nominated | |
| Academy Awards | March 2, 2025 | Best Sound | Simon Hayes, Nancy Nugent Title, Jack Dolman, Andy Nelson, and John Marquis | Nominated | |
| Academy Awards | March 2, 2025 | Best Visual Effects | Pablo Helman, Jonathan Fawkner, David Shirk, and Paul Corbould | Nominated | |
| ADG Excellence in Production Design Awards | February 15, 2025 | Excellence in Production Design for a Fantasy Film | Nathan Crowley | Won | |
| Alliance of Women Film Journalists | January 7, 2025 | Best Film | Wicked | Nominated | |
| Alliance of Women Film Journalists | January 7, 2025 | Best Actress | Cynthia Erivo | Nominated | |
| Alliance of Women Film Journalists | January 7, 2025 | Best Ensemble Cast | Cast of Wicked | Nominated | |
| Alliance of Women Film Journalists | January 7, 2025 | Best Cinematography | Alice Brooks | Nominated | |
| American Cinema Editors Awards | March 14, 2025 | Best Edited Feature Film – Comedy or Musical | Myron Kerstein | Won | |
| American Film Institute Awards | December 5, 2024 | Top 10 Films of the Year | Wicked | Won (Note: This award does not have a single winner, but recognizes multiple films.) | |
| American Music Awards | May 26, 2025 | Favorite Soundtrack | Wicked: The Soundtrack | Nominated | |
| Artios Awards | February 12, 2025 | Outstanding Achievement in Casting – Big Budget Feature (Comedy) | Bernard Telsey, Tiffany Little Canfield, Ryan Bernard Tymensky, and Tamsyn Manson | Won | |
| Astra Awards | December 8, 2024 | Best Picture | Wicked | Won | |
| Astra Awards | December 8, 2024 | Best Comedy or Musical | Wicked | Nominated | |
| Astra Awards | December 8, 2024 | Best Actress | Cynthia Erivo | Won | |
| Astra Awards | December 8, 2024 | Best Supporting Actor | Jonathan Bailey | Nominated | |
| Astra Awards | December 8, 2024 | Best Supporting Actress | Ariana Grande | Won (Note: Tied with Zoe Saldaña for Emilia Pérez) | |
| Astra Awards | December 8, 2024 | Best Adapted Screenplay | Winnie Holzman and Dana Fox | Nominated | |
| Astra Awards | December 8, 2024 | Best Director | Jon M. Chu | Won | |
| Astra Awards | December 8, 2024 | Best Cast Ensemble | Cast of Wicked | Nominated | |
| Astra Awards | December 8, 2024 | Best Casting | Tiffany Little Canfield and Bernard Telsey | Won | |
| Astra Awards | December 8, 2024 | Best Cinematography | Alice Brooks | Nominated | |
| Astra Awards | December 8, 2024 | Best Costume Design | Paul Tazewell | Won | |
| Astra Awards | December 8, 2024 | Best Film Editing | Myron Kerstein | Nominated | |
| Astra Awards | December 8, 2024 | Best Makeup and Hairstyling | Wicked | Nominated | |
| Astra Awards | December 8, 2024 | Best Marketing Campaign | Wicked | Won | |
| Astra Awards | December 8, 2024 | Best Original Score | John Powell and Stephen Schwartz | Nominated | |
| Astra Awards | December 8, 2024 | Best Production Design | Nathan Crowley and Lee Sandales | Won | |
| Astra Awards | December 8, 2024 | Best Sound | Wicked | Nominated | |
| Astra Awards | December 8, 2024 | Best Stunts | Wicked | Nominated | |
| Astra Awards | December 8, 2024 | Best Stunt Coordinator | Jo McLaren | Nominated | |
| Astra Awards | December 8, 2024 | Best Visual Effects | Wicked | Nominated | |
| Austin Film Critics Association | January 6, 2025 | Best Picture | Wicked | Nominated | |
| Austin Film Critics Association | January 6, 2025 | Best Adapted Screenplay | Winnie Holzman and Dana Fox | Nominated | |
| Austin Film Critics Association | January 6, 2025 | Best Supporting Actress | Ariana Grande | Nominated | |
| Austin Film Critics Association | January 6, 2025 | Top 10 Films of 2024 | Wicked | 10th place | |
| BET Awards | June 9, 2025 | BET Her Award | Cynthia Erivo and Ariana Grande for "Defying Gravity" | Nominated | |
| BET Awards | June 9, 2025 | Best Actress | Cynthia Erivo | Won | |
| Black Film Critics Circle | December 19, 2024 | Top Ten Films | Wicked | 2nd place | |
| Black Film Critics Circle | December 19, 2024 | Best Actress | Cynthia Erivo | Won | |
| Black Reel Awards | February 10, 2025 | Outstanding Lead Performance | Cynthia Erivo | Nominated | |
| Black Reel Awards | February 10, 2025 | Outstanding Soundtrack | Wicked | Won | |
| Black Reel Awards | February 10, 2025 | Outstanding Costume Design | Paul Tazewell | Won | |
| Brit Awards | February 28, 2026 | Song of the Year | Cynthia Erivo and Ariana Grande for "Defying Gravity" | Nominated | |
| British Academy Film Awards | February 16, 2025 | Best Actress in a Leading Role | Cynthia Erivo | Nominated | |
| British Academy Film Awards | February 16, 2025 | Best Actress in a Supporting Role | Ariana Grande | Nominated | |
| British Academy Film Awards | February 16, 2025 | Best Costume Design | Paul Tazewell | Won | |
| British Academy Film Awards | February 16, 2025 | Best Make-up & Hair | Frances Hannon, Laura Blount, and Sarah Nuth | Nominated | |
| British Academy Film Awards | February 16, 2025 | Best Production Design | Nathan Crowley and Lee Sandales | Won | |
| British Academy Film Awards | February 16, 2025 | Best Sound | Robin Baynton, Simon Hayes, John Marquis, Andy Nelson, and Nancy Nugent Title | Nominated | |
| British Academy Film Awards | February 16, 2025 | Best Special Visual Effects | Pablo Helman, Paul Corbould, Jonathan Fawkner, and Anthony Smith | Nominated | |
| Camerimage | November 23, 2024 | Production Designer Award | Nathan Crowley | Won | |
| Capri Hollywood International Film Festival | January 2, 2025 | Best Sound Editing | Wicked | Won | |
| Chicago Film Critics Association | December 11, 2024 | Best Actress | Cynthia Erivo | Nominated | |
| Chicago Film Critics Association | December 11, 2024 | Best Supporting Actress | Ariana Grande | Nominated | |
| Chicago Film Critics Association | December 11, 2024 | Best Costume Design | Paul Tazewell | Nominated | |
| Chicago Film Critics Association | December 11, 2024 | Best Original Score | John Powell and Stephen Schwartz | Nominated | |
| Chicago Film Critics Association | December 11, 2024 | Best Use of Visual Effects | Wicked | Nominated | |
| Chicago Film Critics Association | December 11, 2024 | Best Art Direction/Production Design | Nathan Crowley and Lee Sandales | Nominated | |
| Cinema Audio Society Awards | February 22, 2025 | Outstanding Achievement in Sound Mixing for Motion Pictures – Live Action | Simon Hayes, Andy Nelson, John Marquis, John Michael Caldwell, Jason Oliver, Mikel Parraga-Wills | Nominated | |
| Costume Designers Guild Awards | February 6, 2025 | Excellence in Sci-Fi/Fantasy Film | Paul Tazewell | Won | |
| Critics' Choice Movie Awards | February 7, 2025 | Best Picture | Wicked | Nominated | |
| Critics' Choice Movie Awards | February 7, 2025 | Best Director | Jon M. Chu | Won | |
| Critics' Choice Movie Awards | February 7, 2025 | Best Actress | Cynthia Erivo | Nominated | |
| Critics' Choice Movie Awards | February 7, 2025 | Best Supporting Actress | Ariana Grande | Nominated | |
| Critics' Choice Movie Awards | February 7, 2025 | Best Acting Ensemble | Wicked | Nominated | |
| Critics' Choice Movie Awards | February 7, 2025 | Best Adapted Screenplay | Winnie Holzman and Dana Fox | Nominated | |
| Critics' Choice Movie Awards | February 7, 2025 | Best Cinematography | Alice Brooks | Nominated | |
| Critics' Choice Movie Awards | February 7, 2025 | Best Costume Design | Paul Tazewell | Won | |
| Critics' Choice Movie Awards | February 7, 2025 | Best Production Design | Nathan Crowley and Lee Sandales | Won | |
| Critics' Choice Movie Awards | February 7, 2025 | Best Hair and Make-Up | Frances Hannon, Sarah Nuth, and Laura Blount | Nominated | |
| Critics' Choice Movie Awards | February 7, 2025 | Best Visual Effects | Pablo Helman, Jonathan Fawkner, Paul Corbould, and David Shirk | Nominated | |
| Dallas–Fort Worth Film Critics Association | December 18, 2024 | Best Picture | Wicked | 7th place | |
| Dallas–Fort Worth Film Critics Association | December 18, 2024 | Best Supporting Actress | Ariana Grande | 3rd place | |
| Dorian Awards | February 13, 2025 | Film Performance of the Year | Cynthia Erivo | Nominated | |
| Dorian Awards | February 13, 2025 | Supporting Film Performance of the Year | Ariana Grande | Won | |
| Dorian Awards | February 13, 2025 | Genre Film of the Year | Wicked | Nominated | |
| Dorian Awards | February 13, 2025 | Film Music of the Year | Wicked | Nominated | |
| Dorian Awards | February 13, 2025 | “We're Wilde About You" Rising Star Award | Jonathan Bailey | Won | |
| Dorian Awards | February 13, 2025 | Galeca LGBTQIA + Film Trailblazer | Cynthia Erivo | Won | |
| Florida Film Critics Circle | December 20, 2024 | Best Visual Effects | Wicked | Nominated | |
| Georgia Film Critics Association | January 7, 2025 | Best Actress | Cynthia Erivo | Nominated | |
| Georgia Film Critics Association | January 7, 2025 | Best Supporting Actress | Ariana Grande | Runner-up | |
| Georgia Film Critics Association | January 7, 2025 | Best Picture | Wicked | Nominated | |
| Georgia Film Critics Association | January 7, 2025 | Best Adapted Screenplay | Winnie Holzman and Dana Fox | Nominated | |
| Georgia Film Critics Association | January 7, 2025 | Best Production Design | Nathan Crowley and Lee Sandales | Nominated | |
| Georgia Film Critics Association | January 7, 2025 | Best Ensemble | Wicked | Nominated | |
| Golden Globe Awards | January 5, 2025 | Best Motion Picture – Musical or Comedy | Wicked | Nominated | |
| Golden Globe Awards | January 5, 2025 | Cinematic and Box Office Achievement | Wicked | Won | |
| Golden Globe Awards | January 5, 2025 | Best Actress in a Motion Picture – Musical or Comedy | Cynthia Erivo | Nominated | |
| Golden Globe Awards | January 5, 2025 | Best Supporting Actress – Motion Picture | Ariana Grande | Nominated | |
| Golden Reel Awards | February 23, 2025 | Outstanding Achievement in Sound Editing – Feature Dialogue / ADR | John Marquis, Nancy Nugent, John C. Stuver, and David Bach | Nominated | |
| Golden Reel Awards | February 23, 2025 | Outstanding Achievement in Music Editing – Feature Motion Picture | Catherine Wilson and Robin Baynton | Won | |
| Golden Trailer Awards | May 29, 2025 | Best Fantasy/Adventure | Universal Pictures and Trailer Park Group (for "Wickedness") | Won | |
| Golden Trailer Awards | May 29, 2025 | Best Sound Editing | Universal Pictures and Trailer Park Group (for "Wickedness") | Nominated | |
| Golden Trailer Awards | May 29, 2025 | Best Fantasy Adventure TV Spot (for a Feature Film) | Universal Pictures and Inside Job (for "Big Welcome to Oz") | Nominated | |
| Golden Trailer Awards | May 29, 2025 | Best Fantasy Adventure TV Spot (for a Feature Film) | Universal Pictures and Trailer Park Group (for "Get Ready") | Won | |
| Golden Trailer Awards | May 29, 2025 | Best Sound Editing in a TV Spot (for a Feature Film) | Universal Pictures and Trailer Park Group (for "Get Ready") | Nominated | |
| Golden Trailer Awards | May 29, 2025 | Best Music TV Spot (for a Feature Film) | Universal Pictures and Inside Job (for "Fandom") | Nominated | |
| Golden Trailer Awards | May 29, 2025 | Best Music TV Spot (for a Feature Film) | Universal Pictures and Trailer Park Group (for Journey") | Nominated | |
| Golden Trailer Awards | May 29, 2025 | Best Digital – Fantasy Adventure | Universal Pictures and Inside Job (for "Masterpiece/Academy Nominations") | Nominated | |
| Golden Trailer Awards | May 29, 2025 | Most Innovative Advertising for a Feature Film | Universal Pictures and Inside Job (for "Poetry in Emotion") | Won | |
| Golden Trailer Awards | May 29, 2025 | Most Innovative Advertising for a Feature Film | Universal Pictures and SunnyBoy Entertainment (for "Do Us Good") | Nominated | |
| Golden Trailer Awards | May 29, 2025 | Best Animation TrailerByte for a Feature Film | Universal Pictures and Rebel (for "Talent Goldlbum") | Nominated | |
| Golden Trailer Awards | May 29, 2025 | Best Viral Campaign for a Feature Film | Universal Pictures and Rebel | Won | |
| Golden Trailer Awards | May 29, 2025 | Best BTS/EPK for a Feature Film (Under 2 minutes) | Universal Pictures and The Workhouse Picture Company Ltd. (for "A Week On Set With Ariana") | Nominated | |
| Golden Trailer Awards | May 29, 2025 | Best BTS/EPK for a Feature Film (Over 2 minutes) | Universal Pictures and The Workhouse Picture Company Ltd. (for "A Passion Project") | Nominated | |
| Golden Trailer Awards | May 29, 2025 | Best Music | Universal Pictures and Major Major | Nominated | |
| Grammy Awards | February 1, 2026 | Best Compilation Soundtrack for Visual Media | Cynthia Erivo, Ariana Grande & Wicked Movie Cast, artists; Stephen Oremus, Stephen Schwartz, & Greg Wells, compilation producers; Maggie Rodford, music supervisor | Nominated | |
| Grammy Awards | February 1, 2026 | Best Score Soundtrack for Visual Media | John Powell and Stephen Schwartz | Nominated | |
| Grammy Awards | February 1, 2026 | Best Pop Duo/Group Performance | Cynthia Erivo and Ariana Grande (for "Defying Gravity") | Won | |
| Grammy Awards | February 1, 2026 | Best Instrumental Composition | John Powell and Stephen Schwartz (for "Train to Emerald City") | Nominated | |
| Guild of Music Supervisors Awards | February 23, 2025 | Best Music Supervision in Major Budget Films | Maggie Rodford | Won | |
| Hollywood Music In Media Awards | November 20, 2024 | Song – Onscreen Performance (Film) | Cynthia Erivo for "Defying Gravity" | Nominated | |
| Hollywood Music In Media Awards | November 20, 2024 | Music Themed Film, Biopic or Musical | Wicked | Nominated | |
| Houston Film Critics Society | January 14, 2025 | Best Picture | Wicked | Nominated | |
| Houston Film Critics Society | January 14, 2025 | Best Director | Jon M. Chu | Nominated | |
| Houston Film Critics Society | January 14, 2025 | Best Actress - Leading Role | Cynthia Erivo | Nominated | |
| Houston Film Critics Society | January 14, 2025 | Best Actress - Supporting Role | Ariana Grande | Nominated | |
| Houston Film Critics Society | January 14, 2025 | Best Visual Effects | Wicked | Nominated | |
| Houston Film Critics Society | January 14, 2025 | Best Ensemble Cast | Wicked | Nominated | |
| Hugo Awards | August 16, 2025 | Best Dramatic Presentation, Long Form | Jon M. Chu, Winnie Holzman, and Dana Fox | Nominated | |
| iHeartRadio Music Awards | March 17, 2025 | Favorite Soundtrack | Wicked: The Soundtrack | Won | |
| Make-Up Artists and Hair Stylists Guild | February 15, 2025 | Best Period and/or Character Make-Up in a Feature-Length Motion Picture | Frances Hannon, Alice Jones, Nuria Mbornio, Johanna Nielsen, Branka Vorkapic | Won | |
| Make-Up Artists and Hair Stylists Guild | February 15, 2025 | Best Period and/or Character Hair Styling in a Feature-Length Motion Picture | Frances Hannon, Sarah Nuth, Sim Camps, and Gabor Kerekes | Won | |
| NAACP Image Awards | February 22, 2025 | Entertainer Of The Year | Cynthia Erivo | Nominated | |
| NAACP Image Awards | February 22, 2025 | Outstanding Motion Picture | Wicked | Nominated | |
| NAACP Image Awards | February 22, 2025 | Outstanding Actress in a Motion Picture | Cynthia Erivo | Nominated | |
| NAACP Image Awards | February 22, 2025 | Outstanding Ensemble Cast in a Motion Picture | Wicked | Nominated | |
| NAACP Image Awards | February 22, 2025 | Outstanding Costume Design | Paul Tazewell | Won | |
| NAACP Image Awards | February 22, 2025 | Outstanding Soundtrack/Compilation Album | Wicked: The Soundtrack | Won | |
| National Board of Review | December 4, 2024 | Best Film | Wicked | Won | |
| National Board of Review | December 4, 2024 | Best Director | Jon M. Chu | Won | |
| National Board of Review | December 4, 2024 | Spotlight Award | Creative Collaboration of Cynthia Erivo and Ariana Grande | Won | |
| New York Film Critics Online | December 16, 2024 | Best Film | Wicked | Nominated | |
| New York Film Critics Online | December 16, 2024 | Best Director | Jon M. Chu | Nominated | |
| New York Film Critics Online | December 16, 2024 | Best Actress | Cynthia Erivo | Nominated | |
| New York Film Critics Online | December 16, 2024 | Best Supporting Actress | Ariana Grande | Nominated | |
| New York Film Critics Online | December 16, 2024 | Best Ensemble | Cast of Wicked | Nominated | |
| New York Film Critics Online | December 16, 2024 | Best Use of Music | John Powell and Stephen Schwartz | Runner-up | |
| Nickelodeon Kids' Choice Awards | June 21, 2025 | Favorite Movie | Wicked | Won | |
| Nickelodeon Kids' Choice Awards | June 21, 2025 | Favorite Movie Actress | Cynthia Erivo | Nominated | |
| Nickelodeon Kids' Choice Awards | June 21, 2025 | Favorite Movie Actress | Ariana Grande | Won | |
| Nickelodeon Kids' Choice Awards | June 21, 2025 | Favorite Villain | Michelle Yeoh | Nominated | |
| Nickelodeon Kids' Choice Awards | June 21, 2025 | Favorite Villain | Jeff Goldblum | Nominated | |
| Nickelodeon Kids' Choice Awards | June 21, 2025 | Favorite Album | Wicked: The Soundtrack | Nominated | |
| Nickelodeon Kids' Choice Awards | June 21, 2025 | Favorite Song from a Movie | Ariana Grande for "Popular" | Nominated | |
| Nickelodeon Kids' Choice Awards | June 21, 2025 | Favorite Song from a Movie | Cynthia Erivo and Ariana Grande for "Defying Gravity" | Won | |
| North Texas Film Critics Association | December 30, 2024 | Best Actress | Cynthia Erivo | Nominated | |
| North Texas Film Critics Association | December 30, 2024 | Best Supporting Actress | Ariana Grande | Nominated | |
| North Texas Film Critics Association | December 30, 2024 | Best Newcomer | Marissa Bode | Nominated | |
| North Texas Film Critics Association | December 30, 2024 | Best Ensemble | Wicked | Nominated | |
| Online Film Critics Society | January 27, 2025 | Best Picture | Wicked | Nominated | |
| Online Film Critics Society | January 27, 2025 | Best Actress | Cynthia Erivo | Nominated | |
| Online Film Critics Society | January 27, 2025 | Best Supporting Actress | Ariana Grande | Nominated | |
| Online Film Critics Society | January 27, 2025 | Best Production Design | Nathan Crowley | Nominated | |
| Online Film Critics Society | January 27, 2025 | Best Costume Design | Paul Tazewell | Nominated | |
| Online Film Critics Society | January 27, 2025 | Best Visual Effects | Wicked | Nominated | |
| Online Film Critics Society | January 27, 2025 | Top 10 Films | Wicked | 10th place | |
| Online Film Critics Society | January 27, 2025 | Technical Achievement Awards - Choreography | Wicked | Won | |
| Palm Springs International Film Festival | January 3, 2025 | Creative Impact in Acting Award | Cynthia Erivo | Won | |
| Palm Springs International Film Festival | January 3, 2025 | Rising Star Award | Ariana Grande | Won | |
| Producers Guild of America Awards | February 8, 2025 | Darryl F. Zanuck Award for Outstanding Producer of Theatrical Motion Pictures | Marc Platt | Nominated | |
| San Diego Film Critics Society | December 9, 2024 | Best Actress | Cynthia Erivo | Nominated | |
| San Diego Film Critics Society | December 9, 2024 | Best Supporting Actress | Ariana Grande | Won | |
| San Diego Film Critics Society | December 9, 2024 | Best Ensemble | Cast of Wicked | Nominated | |
| San Diego Film Critics Society | December 9, 2024 | Best Production Design | Nathan Crowley and Lee Sandales | Won | |
| San Diego Film Critics Society | December 9, 2024 | Best Use of Music | John Powell and Stephen Schwartz | Nominated | |
| San Diego Film Critics Society | December 9, 2024 | Best Cinematography | Alice Brooks | Nominated | |
| San Diego Film Critics Society | December 9, 2024 | Best Costume Design | Paul Tazewell | Won | |
| San Diego Film Critics Society | December 9, 2024 | Best Sound Design | Wicked | Nominated | |
| San Francisco Bay Area Film Critics Circle | December 15, 2024 | Best Supporting Actress | Ariana Grande | Nominated | |
| San Francisco Bay Area Film Critics Circle | December 15, 2024 | Best Production Design | Nathan Crowley and Lee Sandales | Nominated | |
| Santa Barbara International Film Festival | February 9, 2025 | Virtuoso Award | Ariana Grande | Won | |
| Satellite Awards | January 26, 2025 | Best Motion Picture – Comedy or Musical | Wicked | Nominated | |
| Satellite Awards | January 26, 2025 | Make-Up Award | Wicked | Won | |
| Satellite Awards | January 26, 2025 | Best Actress in a Motion Picture – Comedy or Musical | Cynthia Erivo | Nominated | |
| Satellite Awards | January 26, 2025 | Best Actress in a Supporting Role | Ariana Grande | Won | |
| Satellite Awards | January 26, 2025 | Best Costume Design | Paul Tazewell | Won | |
| Satellite Awards | January 26, 2025 | Best Production Design | Nathan Crowley and Lee Sandales | Nominated | |
| Satellite Awards | January 26, 2025 | Best Sound | Jack Dolman, Simon Hayes, John Marquis, Andy Nelson, and Nancy Nugent Title | Won | |
| Satellite Awards | January 26, 2025 | Best Visual Effects | Pablo Helman, Jonathan Fawkner, Pablo Helman, and David Shirk | Nominated | |
| Saturn Awards | March 8, 2026 | Best 4K Home Media Release | Wicked | Won | |
| Screen Actors Guild Awards | February 23, 2025 | Outstanding Performance by a Female Actor in a Leading Role | Cynthia Erivo | Nominated | |
| Screen Actors Guild Awards | February 23, 2025 | Outstanding Performance by a Female Actor in a Supporting Role | Ariana Grande | Nominated | |
| Screen Actors Guild Awards | February 23, 2025 | Outstanding Performance by a Male Actor in a Supporting Role | Jonathan Bailey | Nominated | |
| Screen Actors Guild Awards | February 23, 2025 | Outstanding Performance by a Cast in a Motion Picture | Jonathan Bailey, Marissa Bode, Peter Dinklage, Cynthia Erivo, Jeff Goldblum, Ariana Grande, Ethan Slater, Bowen Yang, and Michelle Yeoh | Nominated | |
| Screen Actors Guild Awards | February 23, 2025 | Outstanding Action Performance by a Stunt Ensemble in a Motion Picture | Wicked | Nominated | |
| Seattle Film Critics Society | December 16, 2024 | Best Lead Actress | Cynthia Erivo | Nominated | |
| Seattle Film Critics Society | December 16, 2024 | Best Supporting Actress | Ariana Grande | Nominated | |
| Seattle Film Critics Society | December 16, 2024 | Best Production Design | Nathan Crowley and Lee Sandales | Nominated | |
| Seattle Film Critics Society | December 16, 2024 | Best Costume Design | Paul Tazewell | Won | |
| Seattle Film Critics Society | December 16, 2024 | Best Visual Effects | Anthony Smith, Jonathan Fawkner, Pablo Helman, and Robert Weaver | Nominated | |
| Set Decorators Society of America | February 5, 2025 | Best Achievement in Décor/Design of a Comedy or Musical Feature Film | Lee Sandales and Nathan Crowley | Won | |
| Society of Composers & Lyricists | February 12, 2025 | Outstanding Original Score for a Studio Film | John Powell and Stephen Schwartz | Nominated | |
| Southeastern Film Critics Association | December 16, 2024 | Top 10 Films of 2024 | Wicked | 8th place | |
| Southeastern Film Critics Association | December 16, 2024 | Best Supporting Actress | Ariana Grande | Won | |
| St. Louis Film Critics Association | December 15, 2024 | Best Film | Wicked | Nominated | |
| St. Louis Film Critics Association | December 15, 2024 | Best Adapted Screenplay | Winnie Holzman and Dana Fox | Nominated | |
| St. Louis Film Critics Association | December 15, 2024 | Best Actress | Cynthia Erivo | Nominated | |
| St. Louis Film Critics Association | December 15, 2024 | Best Supporting Actress | Ariana Grande | Runner-up | |
| St. Louis Film Critics Association | December 15, 2024 | Best Ensemble | Cast of Wicked | Nominated | |
| St. Louis Film Critics Association | December 15, 2024 | Best Costume Design | Paul Tazewell | Won | |
| St. Louis Film Critics Association | December 15, 2024 | Best Production Design | Nathan Crowley and Lee Sandales | Runner-up | |
| St. Louis Film Critics Association | December 15, 2024 | Best Soundtrack | Stephen Schwartz, Stephen Oremus, and Greg Wells | Runner-up | |
| Visual Effects Society Awards | February 11, 2025 | Outstanding Created Environment in a Photoreal Feature | Alan Lam, Steve Bevins, Deepali Negi, and Miguel Sánchez López-Ruíz (for "Emerald City") | Nominated | |
| Washington D.C. Area Film Critics Association | December 8, 2024 | Best Feature | Wicked | Won | |
| Washington D.C. Area Film Critics Association | December 8, 2024 | Best Director | Jon M. Chu | Nominated | |
| Washington D.C. Area Film Critics Association | December 8, 2024 | Best Adapted Screenplay | Winnie Holzman and Dana Fox | Nominated | |
| Washington D.C. Area Film Critics Association | December 8, 2024 | Best Actress | Cynthia Erivo | Nominated | |
| Washington D.C. Area Film Critics Association | December 8, 2024 | Best Supporting Actress | Ariana Grande | Nominated | |
| Washington D.C. Area Film Critics Association | December 8, 2024 | Best Acting Ensemble | Cast of Wicked | Nominated | |
| Washington D.C. Area Film Critics Association | December 8, 2024 | Best Production Design | Nathan Crowley and Lee Sandales | Won | |
| Washington D.C. Area Film Critics Association | December 8, 2024 | Best Editing | Myron Kerstein | Nominated | |
| Writers Guild of America Awards | February 15, 2025 | Best Adapted Screenplay | Winnie Holzman and Dana Fox | Nominated | |
