= 29th Satellite Awards =

2025 awards ceremony for film and television

- Date: January 26, 2025; February 21, 2025 (ceremony)

Highlights
- Most wins: Film: Wicked (4); Television: Feud: Capote vs. The Swans (2)
- Most nominations: Film: The Brutalist (10); Television: Shōgun (5)
- Best Motion Picture – Drama: The Brutalist
- Best Motion Picture – Comedy or Musical: Anora
- Best Television Series – Drama: Slow Horses
- Best Television Series – Comedy or Musical: Hacks
- Best Miniseries & Limited Series or Motion Picture Made for Television: Ripley

The 29th Satellite Awards is an award ceremony honoring the year's outstanding performers, films and television series, presented by the International Press Academy.

The nominations were announced on December 16, 2024. The winners were announced on January 26, 2025; however, the awards presentation was postponed, due to the January Southern California wildfires, to February 21, 2025.

Brady Corbet's epic period drama The Brutalist led the film nominations with ten, followed by Dune: Part Two with nine, while Conclave and Emilia Pérez received eight nominations each. For the television categories, the historical drama Shōgun received the most nominations with five, followed by Baby Reindeer, The Curse and Feud: Capote vs. The Swans with four each.

== Special achievement awards ==
- Auteur Award (for singular vision and unique artistic control over the elements of production) – F. Javier Gutiérrez
- Honorary Satellite Award – Radha Mitchell
- Humanitarian Award (for making a difference in the lives of those in the artistic community and beyond) – Alejandro Monteverde
- Mary Pickford Award (for outstanding artistic contribution to the entertainment industry) – James Woods
- Nikola Tesla Award (for visionary achievement in filmmaking technology) – Simon Hayes
- Make-Up Award – Wicked
- Stunt Performance Award – Twilight of the Warriors: Walled In
- Ensemble: Motion Picture – Nosferatu
- Ensemble: Television – Feud: Capote vs. The Swans

== Motion picture winners and nominees ==
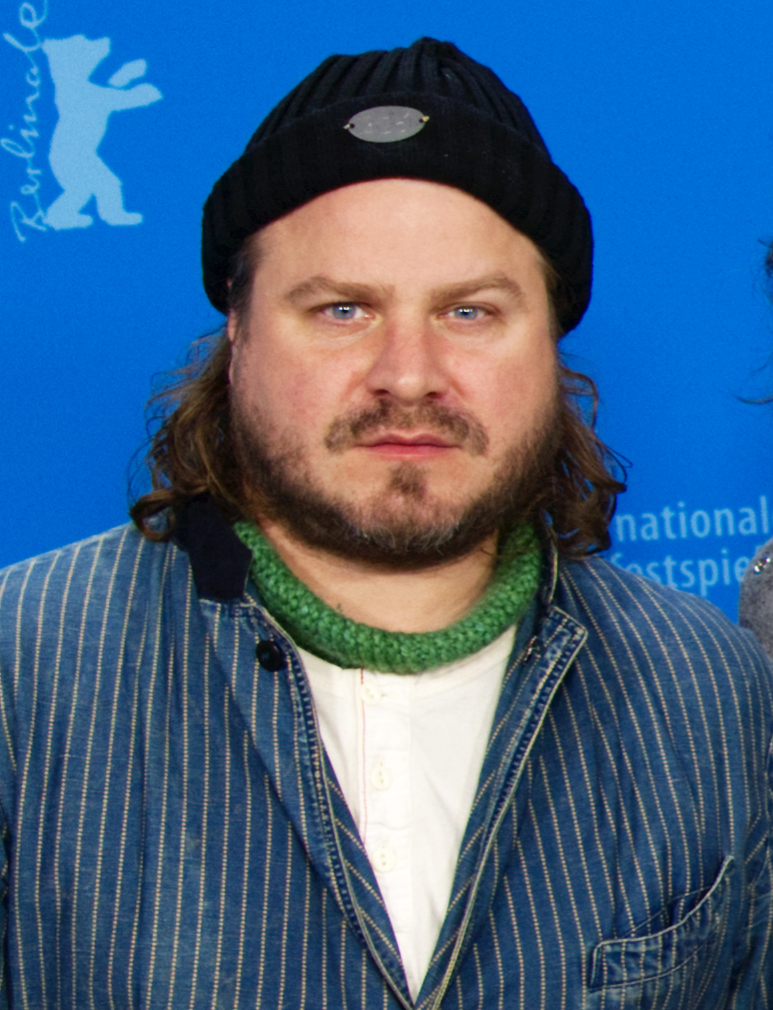
Brady Corbet, Best Director winner

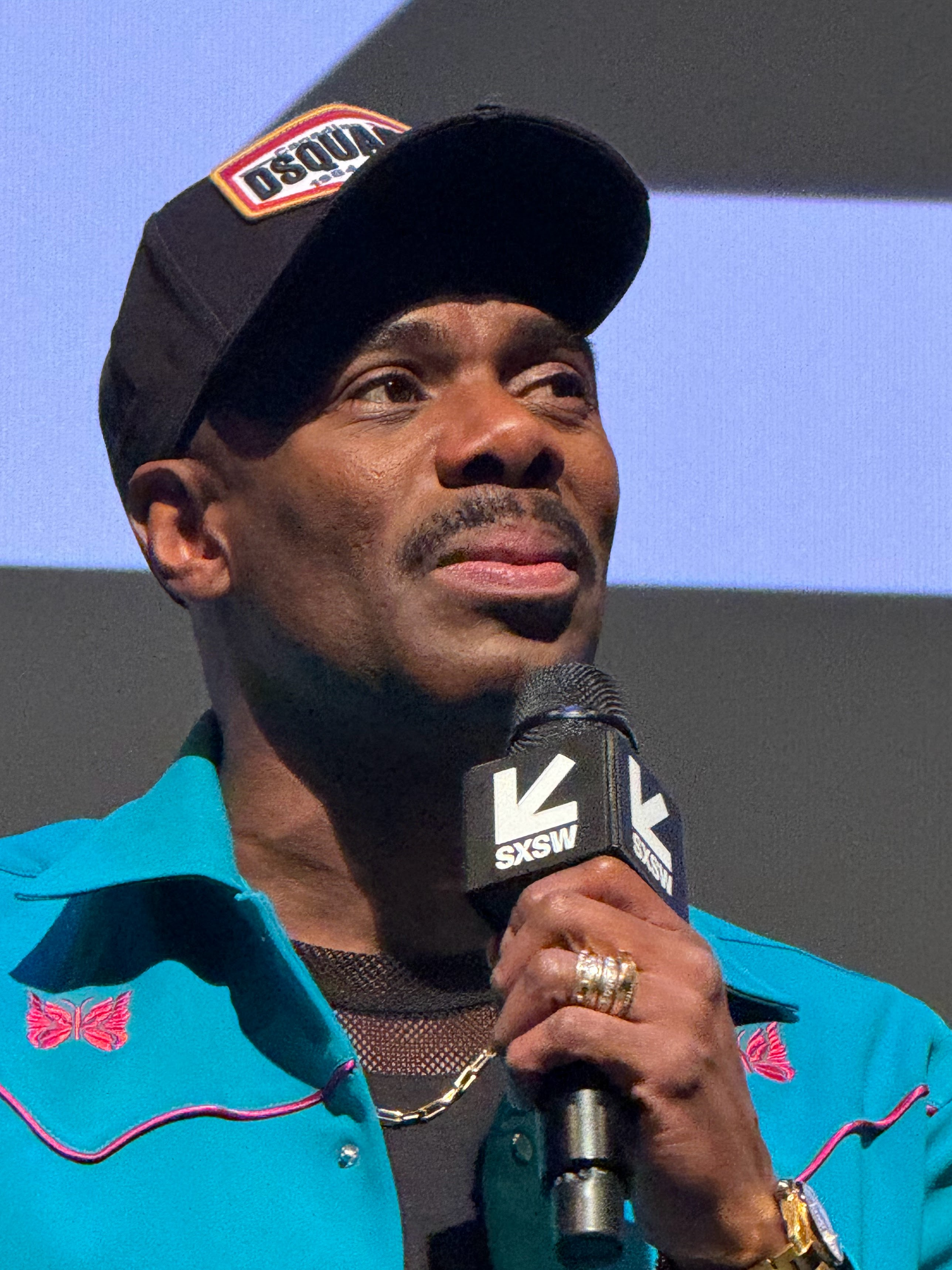
Colman Domingo, Best Actor in a Motion Picture – Drama winner

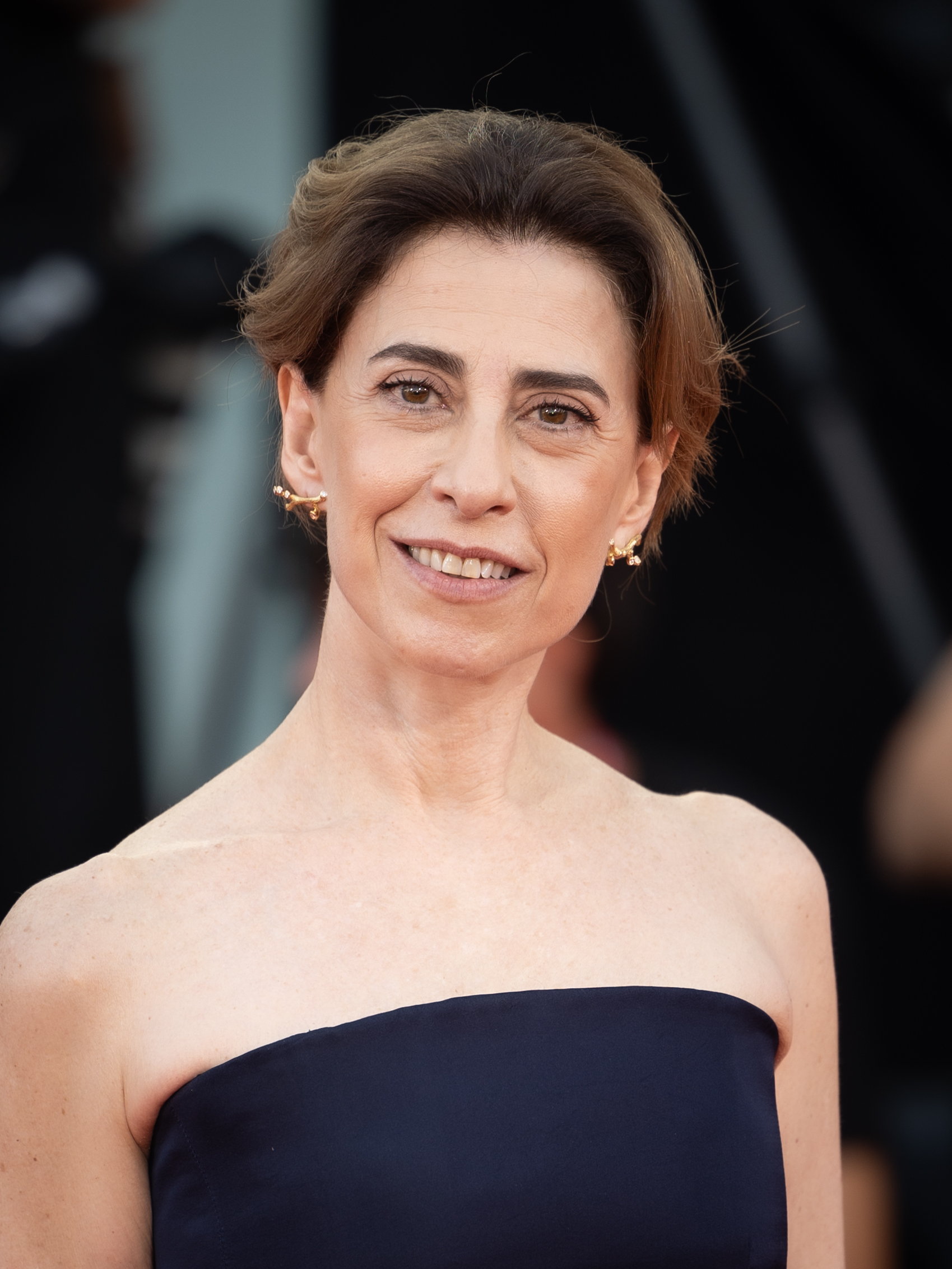
Fernanda Torres, Best Actress in a Motion Picture – Drama winner

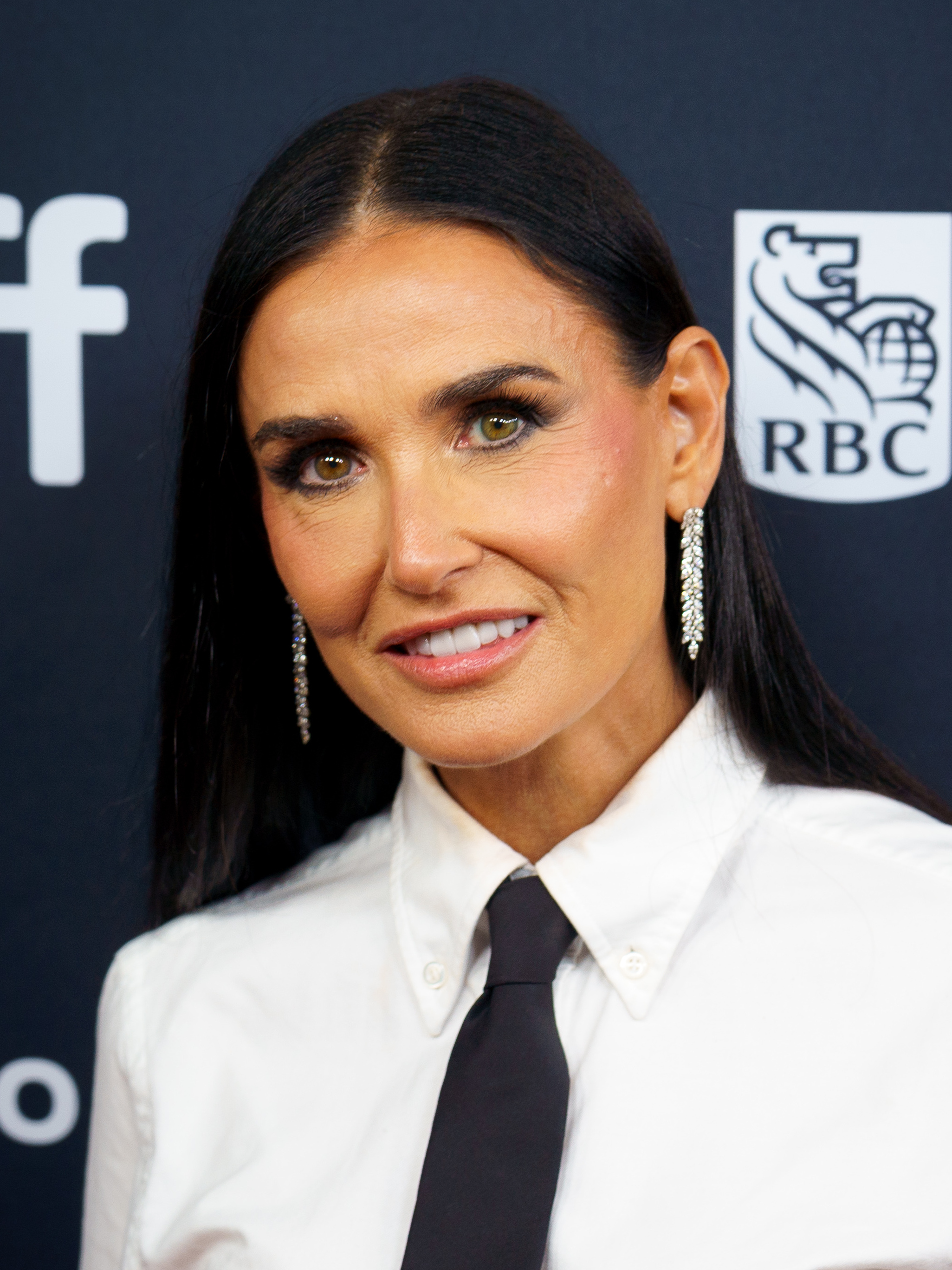
Demi Moore, Best Actress in a Motion Picture – Comedy or Musical winner

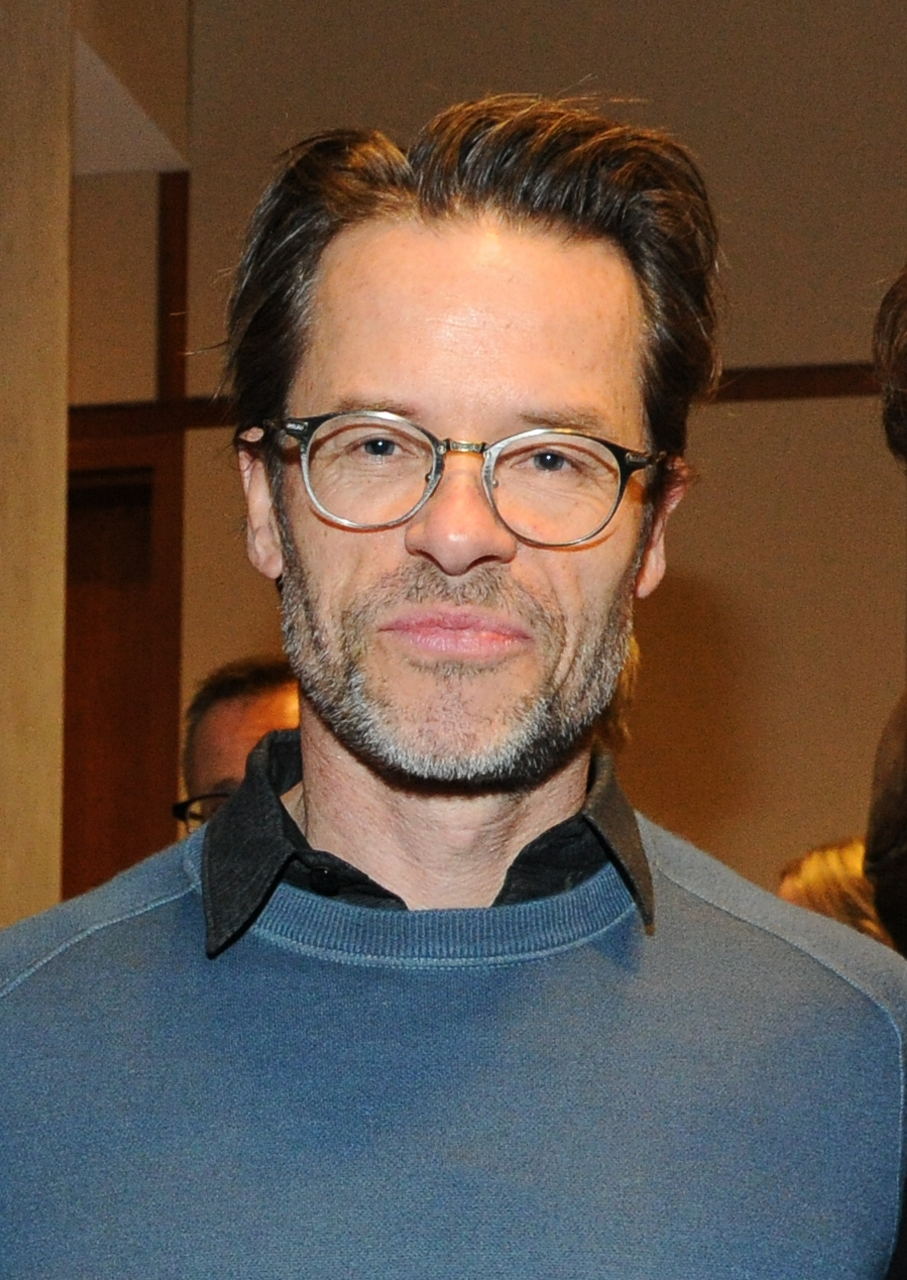
Guy Pearce, Best Actor in a Supporting Role winner

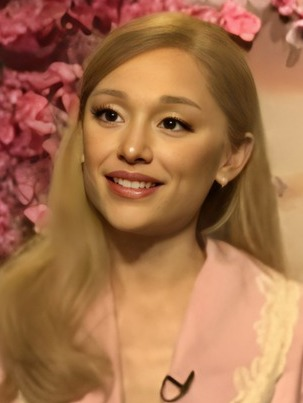
Ariana Grande, Best Actress in a Supporting Role winner

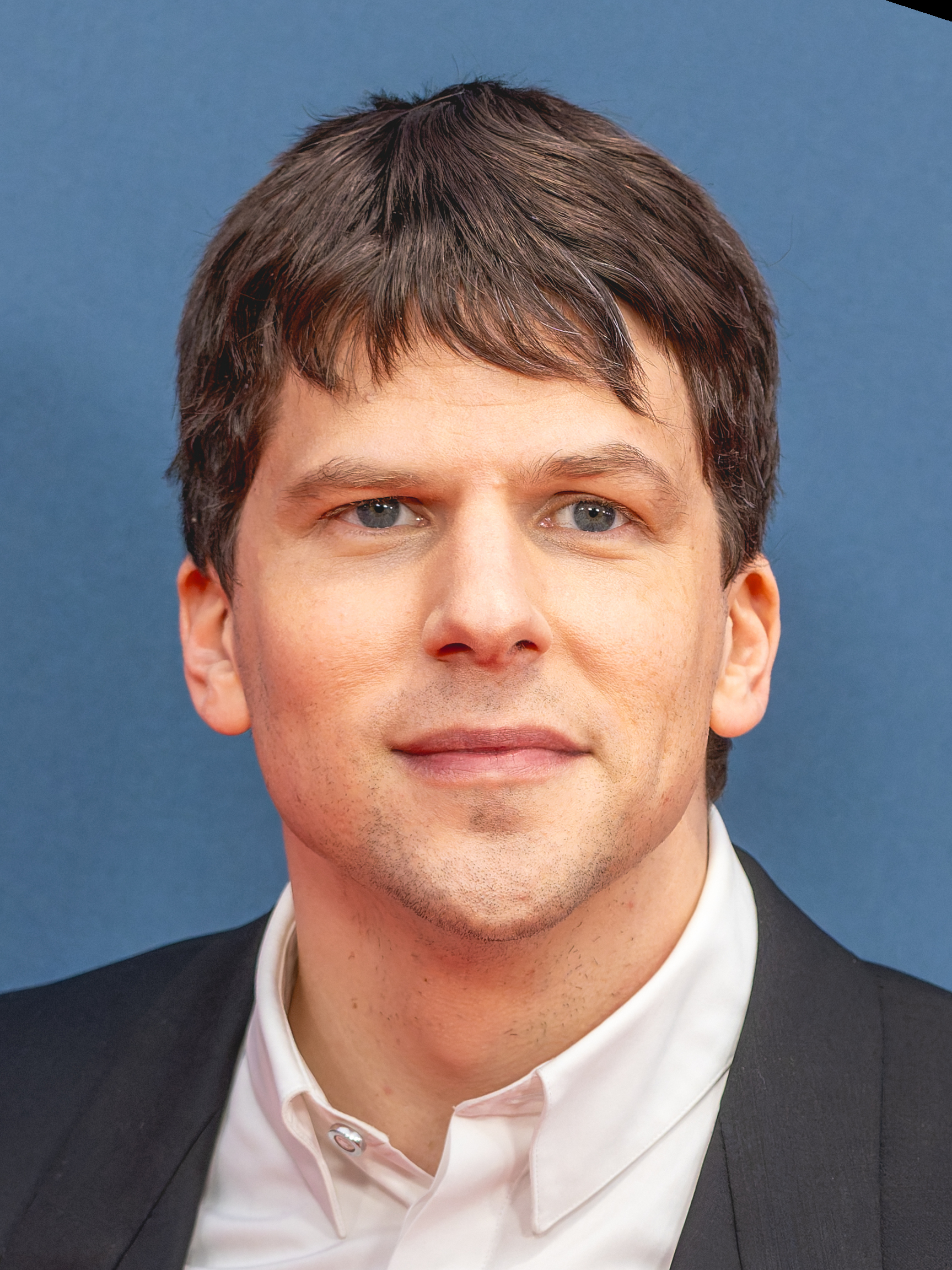
Jesse Eisenberg, Best Original Screenplay winner

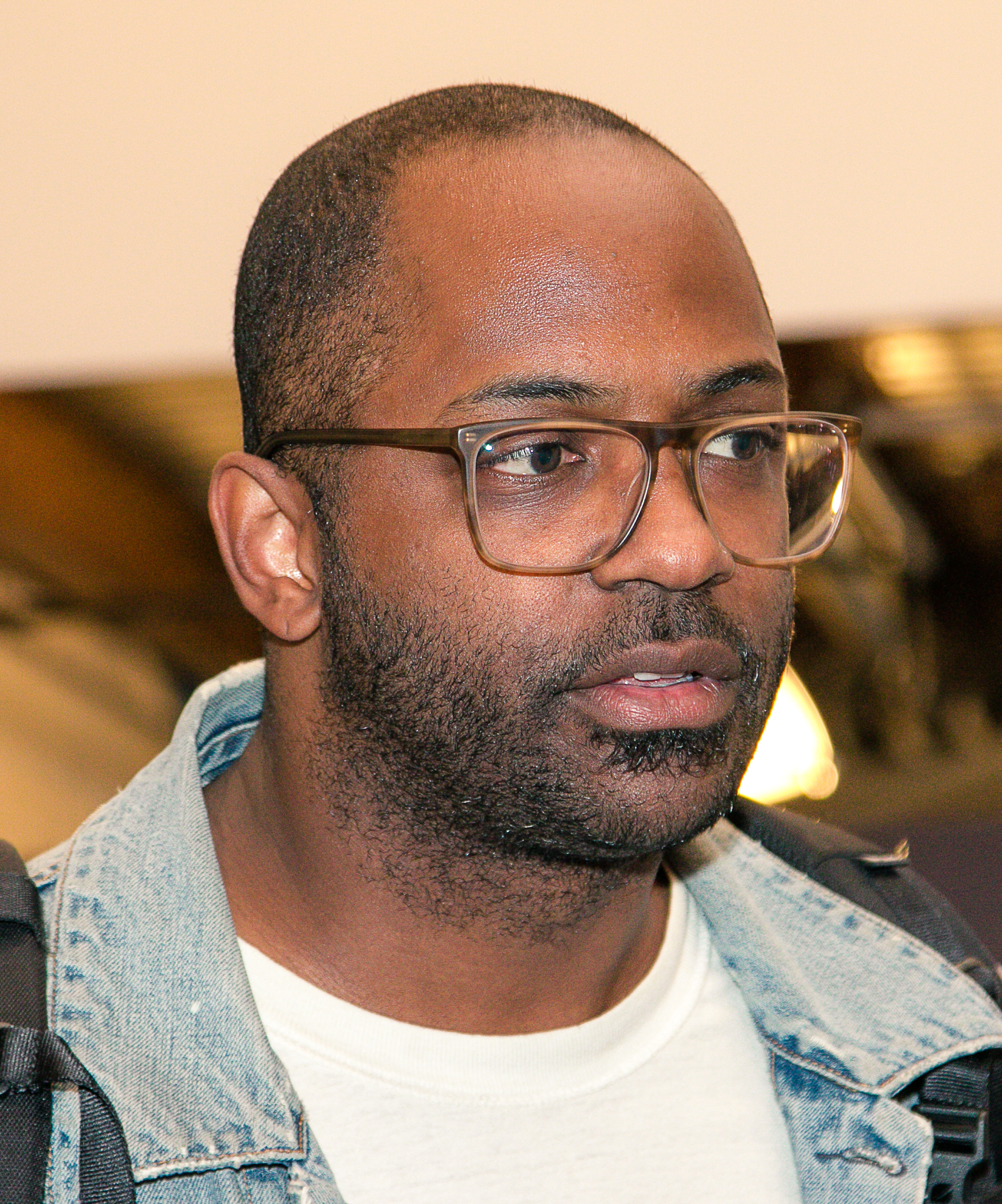
RaMell Ross, Best Adapted Screenplay co-winner

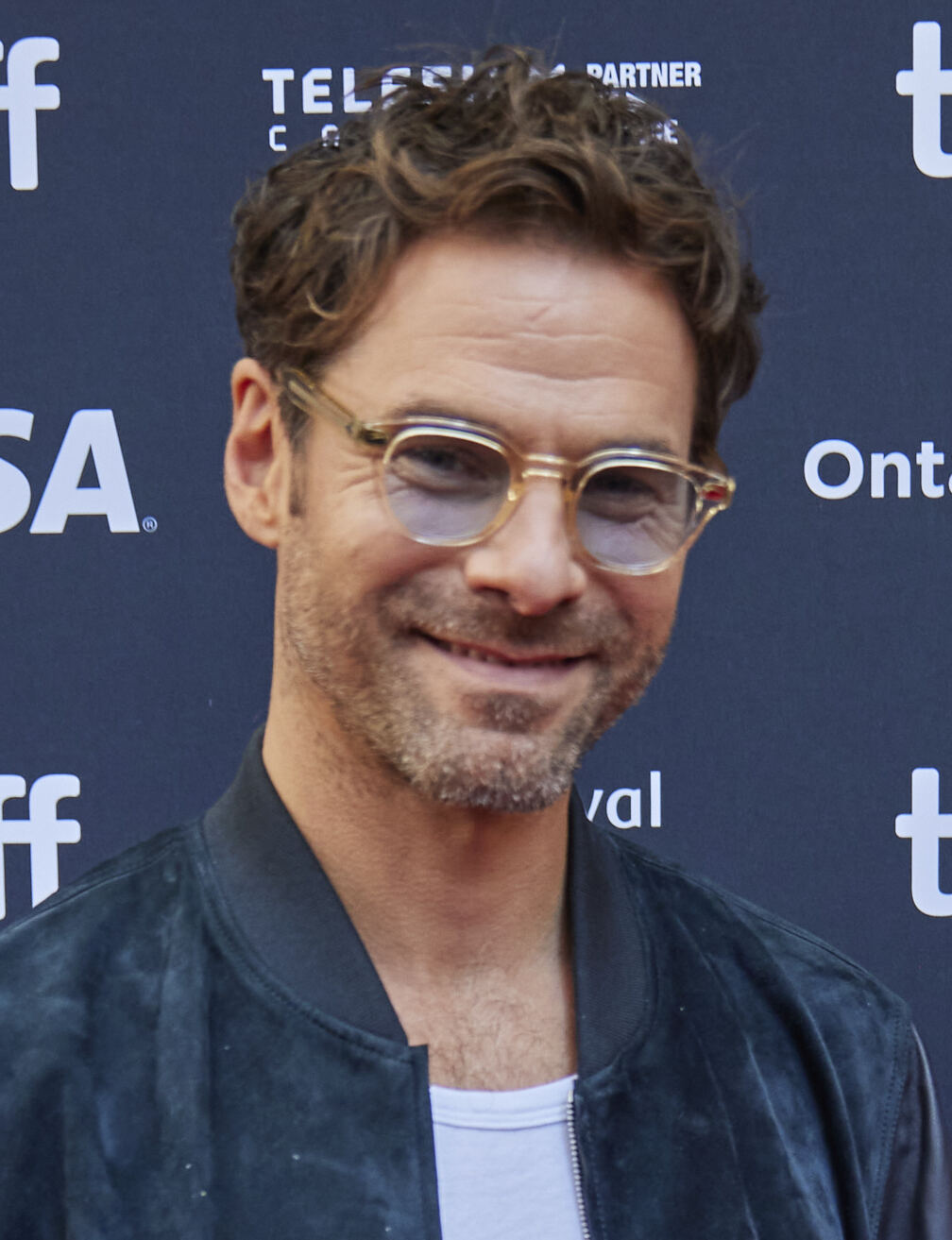
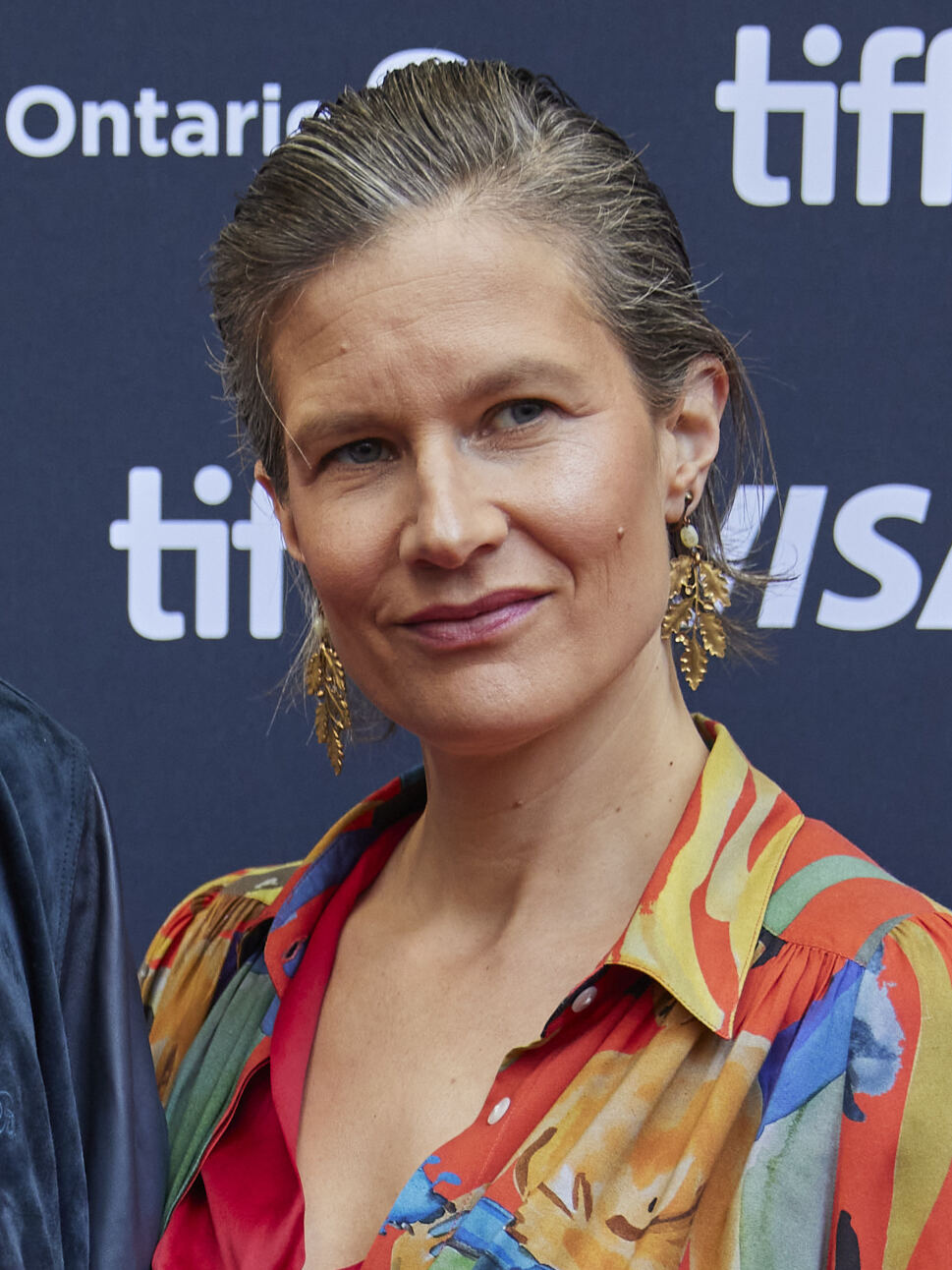
Clément Ducol and Camille, Best Original Score and Best Original Song winners

Winners are listed first and highlighted in bold.

Best Motion Picture – Drama	Best Motion Picture – Comedy or Musical
**The Brutalist**; Cabrini; Conclave; Dune: Part Two; Nickel Boys; The Order; Sing Sing; Young Woman and the Sea	**Anora**; Ghostlight; Hit Man; LaRoy, Texas; A Real Pain; The Substance; Thelma; Wicked
Best Motion Picture – Animated or Mixed Media	Best Director
**Wallace & Gromit: Vengeance Most Fowl**; Flow; Inside Out 2; Memoir of a Snail; Mobile Suit Gundam SEED Freedom; The Wild Robot	**Brady Corbet – The Brutalist**; Sean Baker – Anora; Edward Berger – Conclave; Greg Kwedar – Sing Sing; RaMell Ross – Nickel Boys; Denis Villeneuve – Dune: Part Two
Best Actor in a Motion Picture – Drama	Best Actress in a Motion Picture – Drama
**Colman Domingo – Sing Sing as John "Divine G" Whitfield**; Adrien Brody – The Brutalist as László Tóth; Timothée Chalamet – A Complete Unknown as Bob Dylan; Daniel Craig – Queer as William Lee; Ralph Fiennes – Conclave as Cardinal Thomas Lawrence; Hugh Grant – Heretic as Mr. Reed	**Fernanda Torres – I'm Still Here as Eunice Paiva**; Lily-Rose Depp – Nosferatu as Ellen Hutter; Angelina Jolie – Maria as Maria Callas; Nicole Kidman – Babygirl as Romy Mathis; Saoirse Ronan – The Outrun as Rona; Tilda Swinton – The Room Next Door as Martha Hunt / Michelle
Best Actor in a Motion Picture – Comedy or Musical	Best Actress in a Motion Picture – Comedy or Musical
**Keith Kupferer – Ghostlight as Dan Mueller**; Jesse Eisenberg – A Real Pain as David Kaplan; Ryan Gosling – The Fall Guy as Colt Seavers; Michael Keaton – Beetlejuice Beetlejuice as Betelgeuse; John Magaro – LaRoy, Texas as Ray; Glen Powell – Hit Man as Gary Johnson	**Demi Moore – The Substance as Elisabeth Sparkle**; Cynthia Erivo – Wicked as Elphaba Thropp; Karla Sofía Gascón – Emilia Pérez as Emilia Pérez / Juan "Manitas" Del Monte; Mikey Madison – Anora as Anora "Ani" Mikheeva; Winona Ryder – Beetlejuice Beetlejuice as Lydia Deetz; June Squibb – Thelma as Thelma Post
Best Actor in a Supporting Role	Best Actress in a Supporting Role
**Guy Pearce – The Brutalist as Harrison Lee Van Buren Sr.**; Yura Borisov – Anora as Igor; Kieran Culkin – A Real Pain as Benji Kaplan; Clarence Maclin – Sing Sing as Clarence "Divine Eye" Maclin; Edward Norton – A Complete Unknown as Pete Seeger; Denzel Washington – Gladiator II as Macrinus	**Ariana Grande – Wicked as Galinda "Glinda" Upland**; Danielle Deadwyler – The Piano Lesson as Berniece Charles; Felicity Jones – The Brutalist as Erzsébet Tóth; Margaret Qualley – The Substance as Sue; Isabella Rossellini – Conclave as Sister Agnes; Zoe Saldaña – Emilia Pérez as Rita Mora Castro
Best Original Screenplay	Best Adapted Screenplay
**A Real Pain – Jesse Eisenberg**; Anora – Sean Baker; The Brutalist – Brady Corbet and Mona Fastvold; Hard Truths – Mike Leigh; The Seed of the Sacred Fig – Mohammad Rasoulof; The Substance – Coralie Fargeat	**Nickel Boys – RaMell Ross and Joslyn Barnes; based on the novel The Nickel Boys by Colson Whitehead**; Conclave – Peter Straughan; based on the novel by Robert Harris; Emilia Pérez – Jacques Audiard; based on the play Listen by Boris Razon; The Room Next Door – Pedro Almodóvar; based on the novel What Are You Going Through by Sigrid Nunez; Russian Consul – Vuk Drašković and Miroslav Lekic; based on the novel by Vuk Drašković; Sing Sing – Clint Bentley, Greg Kwedar, Clarence Maclin, and John "Divine G" Whitfield; based on the article The Sing Sing Follies by John H. Richardson and the book Breakin' the Mummy's Code by Brent Buell
Best Motion Picture – Documentary	Best Motion Picture – International
**Super/Man: The Christopher Reeve Story**; The Bloody Hundredth; Dahomey; Elizabeth Taylor: The Lost Tapes; I Am: Celine Dion; No Other Land; Porcelain War; Sugarcane	**Waves (Czech Republic)**; The Girl with the Needle (Denmark); I'm Still Here (Brazil); Queens (Peru / Switzerland); The Seed of the Sacred Fig (Germany); The Wait (Spain)
Best Cinematography	Best Film Editing
**Dune: Part Two – Greig Fraser**; The Brutalist – Lol Crawley; Gladiator II – John Mathieson; Maria – Edward Lachman; Nickel Boys – Jomo Fray; Nosferatu – Jarin Blaschke	**Dune: Part Two – Joe Walker**; Anora – Sean Baker; The Brutalist – Dávid Jancsó; Conclave – Nick Emerson; Emilia Pérez – Juliette Welfling; Gladiator II – Sam Restivo and Claire Simpson
Best Costume Design	Best Production Design
**Wicked – Paul Tazewell**; Blitz – Jacqueline Durran; Dune: Part Two – Jacqueline West; Gladiator II – David Crossman and Janty Yates; Maria – Massimo Cantini Parrini; Nosferatu – Linda Muir	**Gladiator II – Arthur Max (Production Designer); Jille Azis and Elli Griff (Set Decorators)**; The Brutalist – Judy Becker (Production Designer); Patricia Cuccia and Mercédesz Nagyváradi (Set Decorators); Conclave – Suzie Davies (Production Designer); Cynthia Sleiter (Set Decorator); Dune: Part Two – Patrice Vermette (Production Designer); Shane Vieau (Set Decorator); Nosferatu – Craig Lathrop (Production Designer); Beatrice Brentnerová (Set Decorator); Wicked – Nathan Crowley (Production Designer); Lee Sandales (Set Decorator)
Best Original Score	Best Original Song
**Emilia Pérez – Clément Ducol and Camille**; The Brutalist – Daniel Blumberg; Conclave – Volker Bertelmann; Dune: Part Two – Hans Zimmer; The Room Next Door – Alberto Iglesias; The Wild Robot – Kris Bowers	**"Mi Camino" from Emilia Pérez – Clément Ducol and Camille**; "El Mal" from Emilia Pérez – Clément Ducol, Camille, and Jacques Audiard; "The Journey" from The Six Triple Eight – Diane Warren; "Kiss the Sky" from The Wild Robot – Delacey, Jordan Johnson, Stefan Johnson, Maren Morris, Michael Pollack, and Ali Tamposi; "Never Too Late" from Elton John: Never Too Late – Elton John and Brandi Carlile; "Winter Coat" from Blitz – Nicholas Britell, Steve McQueen, and Taura Stinson
Best Sound (Editing and Mixing)	Best Visual Effects
**Wicked – Jack Dolman, Simon Hayes, John Marquis, Andy Nelson, and Nancy Nugent Title**; A Complete Unknown – Ted Caplan, David Giammarco, Tod Maitland, Paul Massey, and Donald Sylvester; Dune: Part Two – Ron Bartlett, Doug Hemphill, Gareth John, and Richard King; Emilia Pérez – Hortense Bailly, Aymeric Devoldère, Cyril Holtz, and Carolina Santana; Gladiator II – Stéphane Bucher, Matthew Collinge, Paul Massey, and Danny Sheehan; Twisters – Christopher Boyes, Pete Horner, Al Nelson, and Bjørn Ole Schroeder	**Gladiator II – Mark Bakowski, Neil Corbould, Nikki Penny, and Pietro Ponti**; Dune: Part Two – Stephen James, Paul Lambert, Gerd Nefzer, and Rhys Salcombe; Kingdom of the Planet of the Apes – Rodney Burke, Paul Story, Stephen Unterfranz, and Erik Winquist; Mufasa: The Lion King – Audrey Ferrara and Adam Valdez; Twilight of the Warriors: Walled In – Garrett Lam, Jules Lin, and Kwok-Leung Yu; Wicked – Paul Corbould, Jonathan Fawkner, Pablo Helman, and David Shirk

=== Films with multiple nominations ===
Nominations	Films
10	The Brutalist
9	Dune: Part Two
8	Conclave
8	Emilia Pérez
7	Gladiator II
7	Wicked
6	Anora
5	Sing Sing
4	Nickel Boys
4	Nosferatu
4	A Real Pain
4	The Substance
3	A Complete Unknown
3	Maria
3	The Room Next Door
3	The Wild Robot
2	Beetlejuice Beetlejuice
2	Blitz
2	Ghostlight
2	Hit Man
2	I'm Still Here
2	LaRoy, Texas
2	The Seed of the Sacred Fig
2	Thelma

=== Films with multiple wins ===
Wins	Films
4	Wicked
3	The Brutalist
2	Dune: Part Two
2	Emilia Pérez
2	Gladiator II

== Television winners and nominees ==
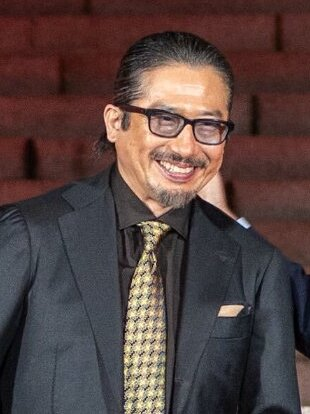
Hiroyuki Sanada, Best Actor in a Drama or Genre Series winner

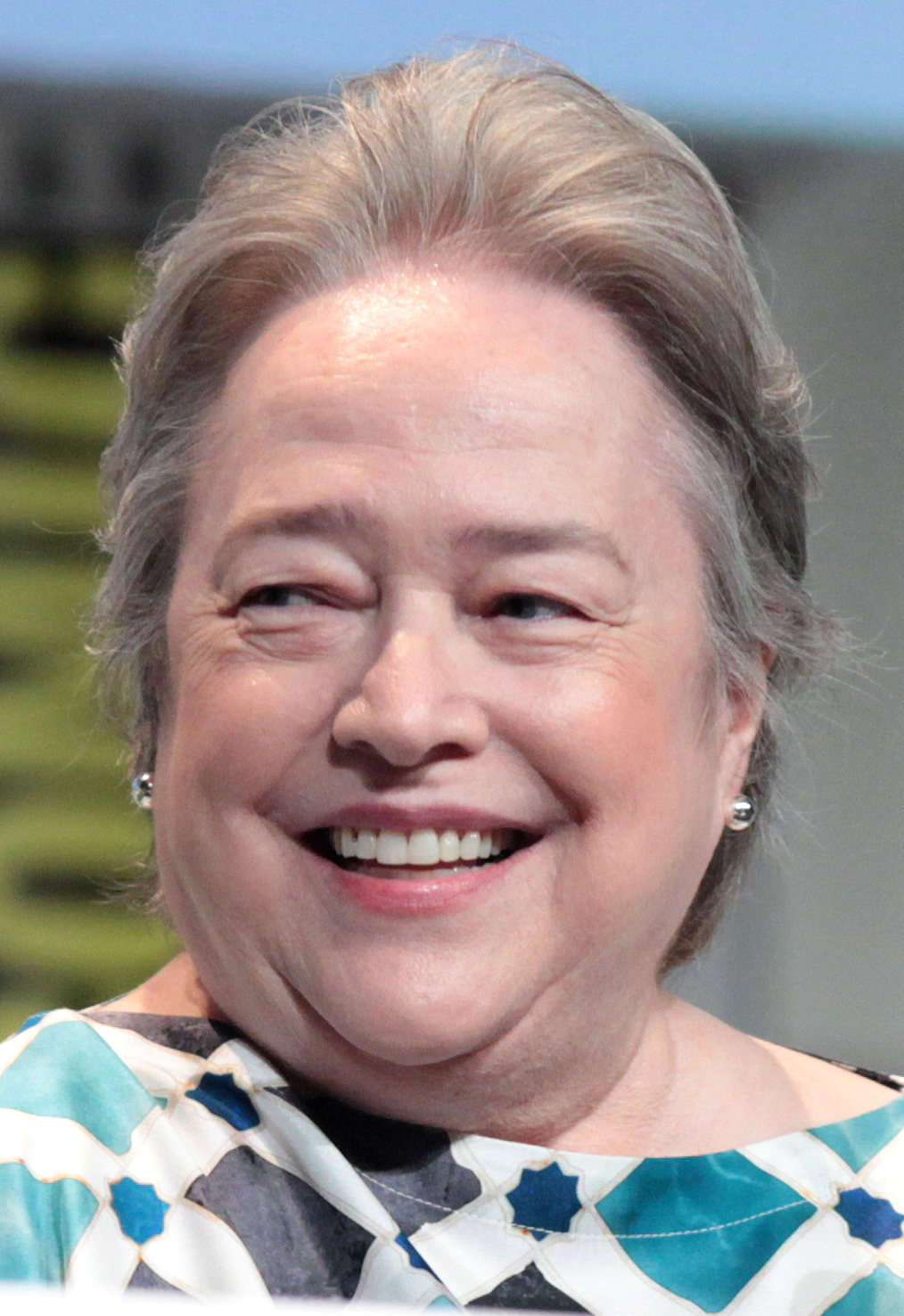
Kathy Bates, Best Actress in a Drama or Genre Series winner

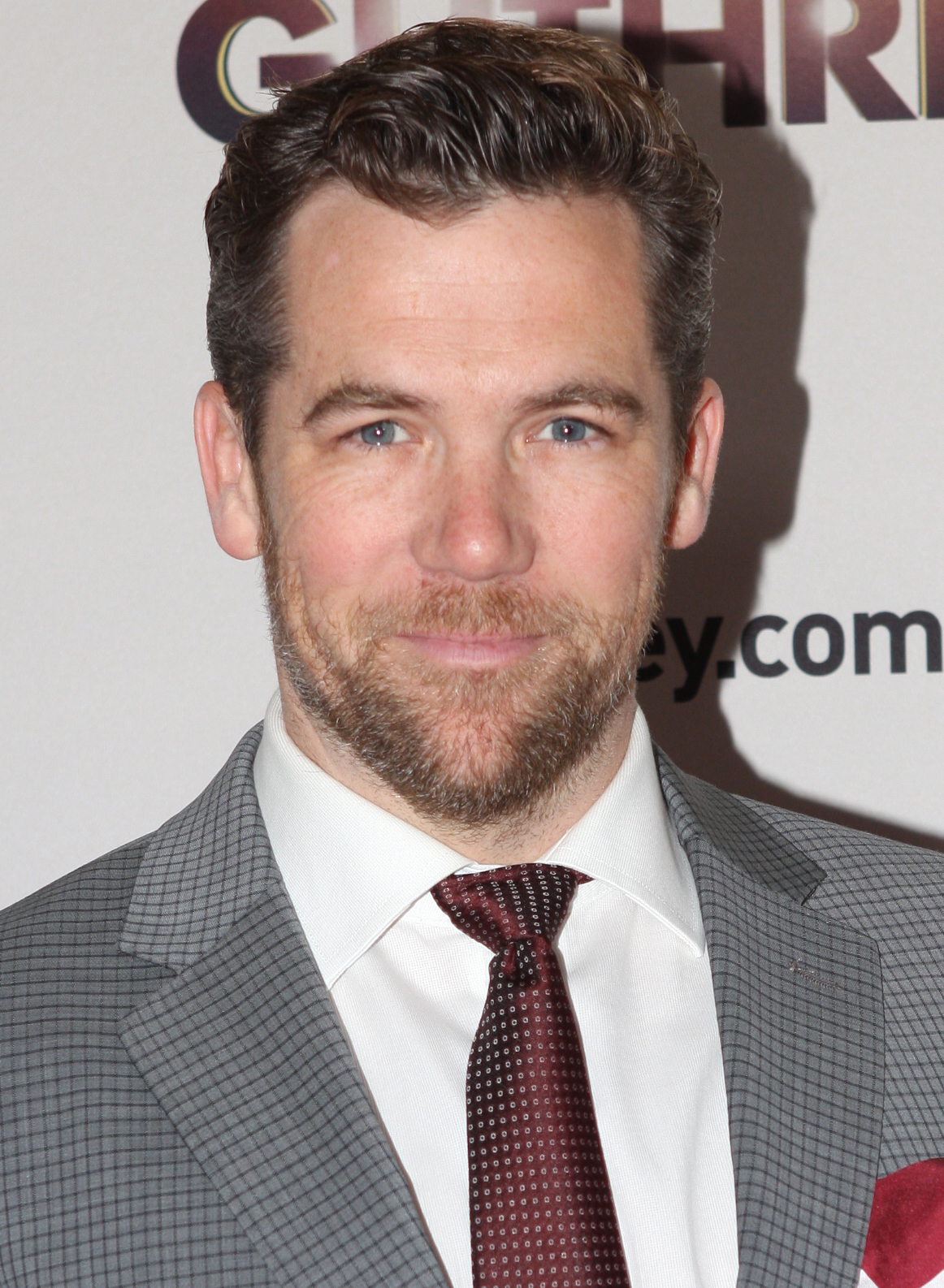
Patrick Brammall, Best Actor in a Comedy or Musical Series winner

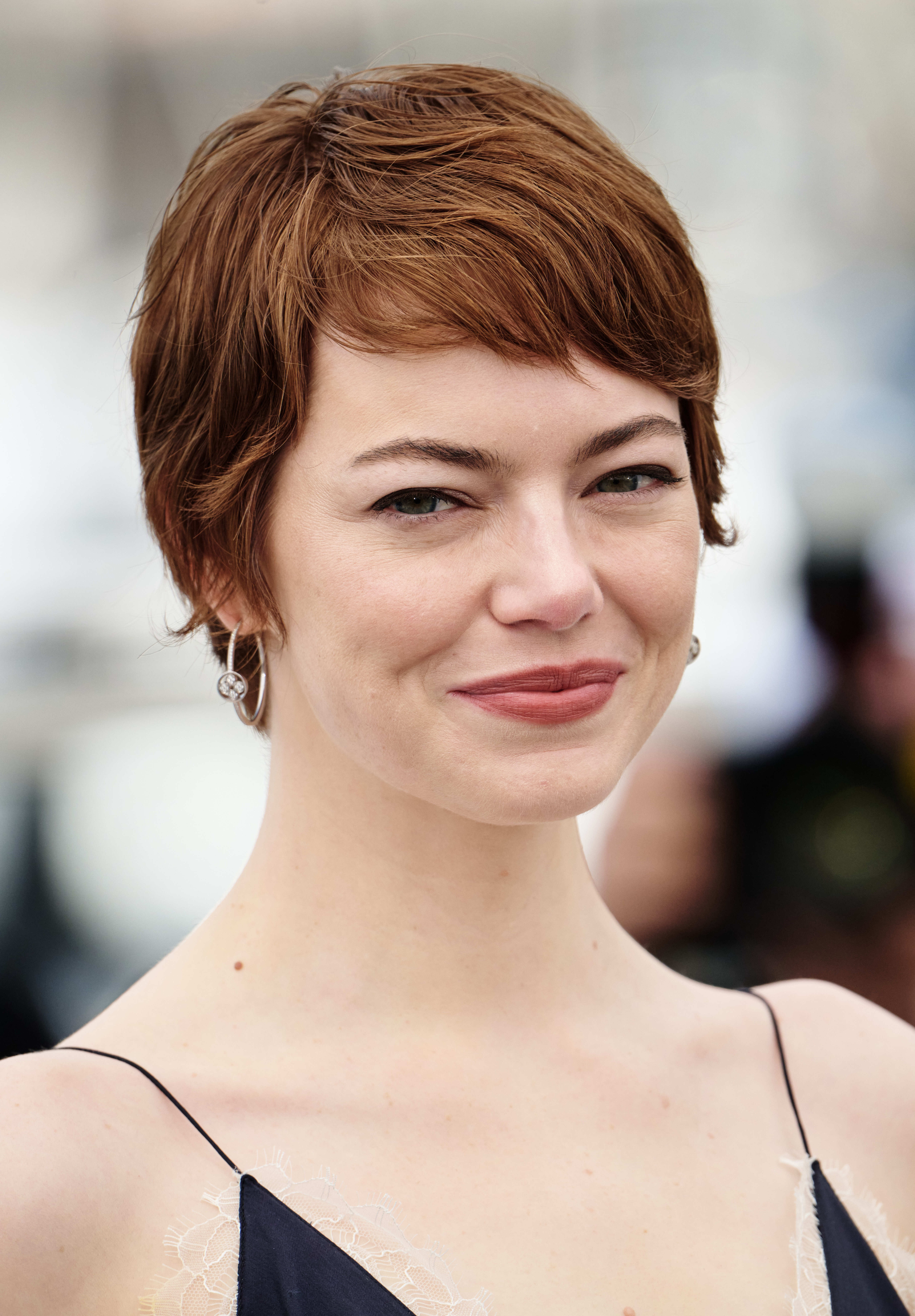
Emma Stone, Best Actress in a Comedy or Musical Series winner

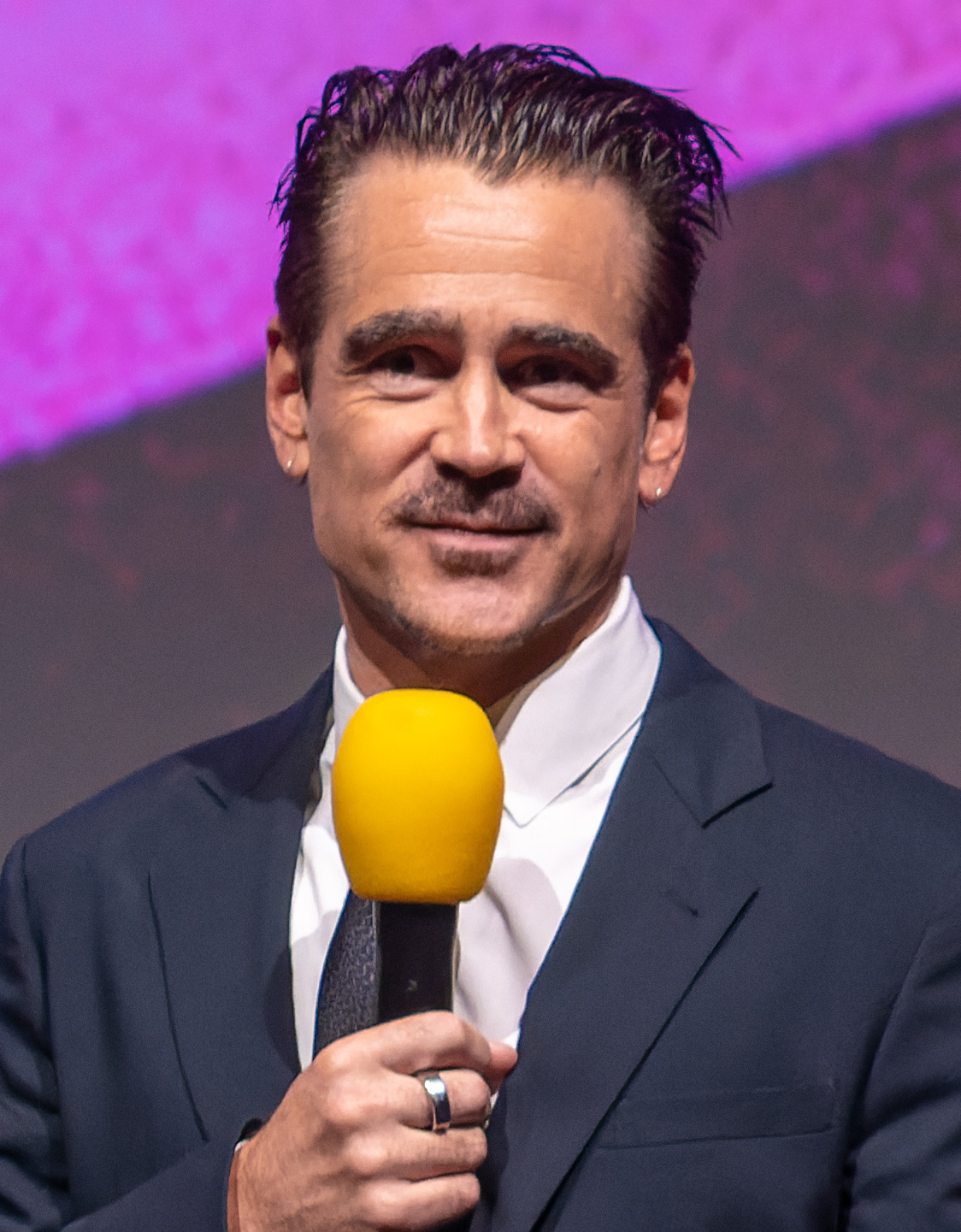
Colin Farrell, Best Actor in a Miniseries, Limited Series, or Motion Picture Made for Television winner

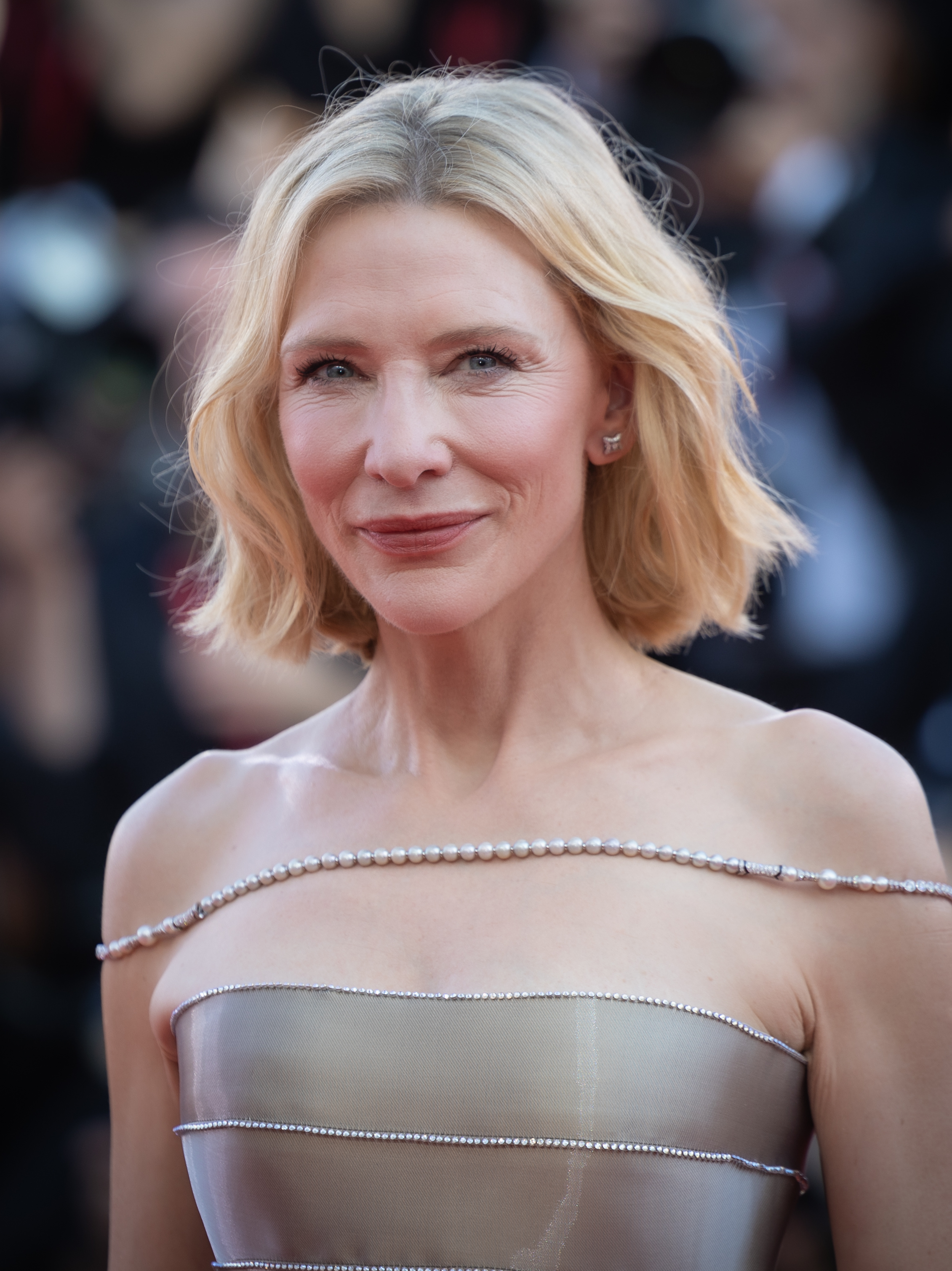
Cate Blanchett, Best Actress in a Miniseries, Limited Series, or Motion Picture Made for Television winner

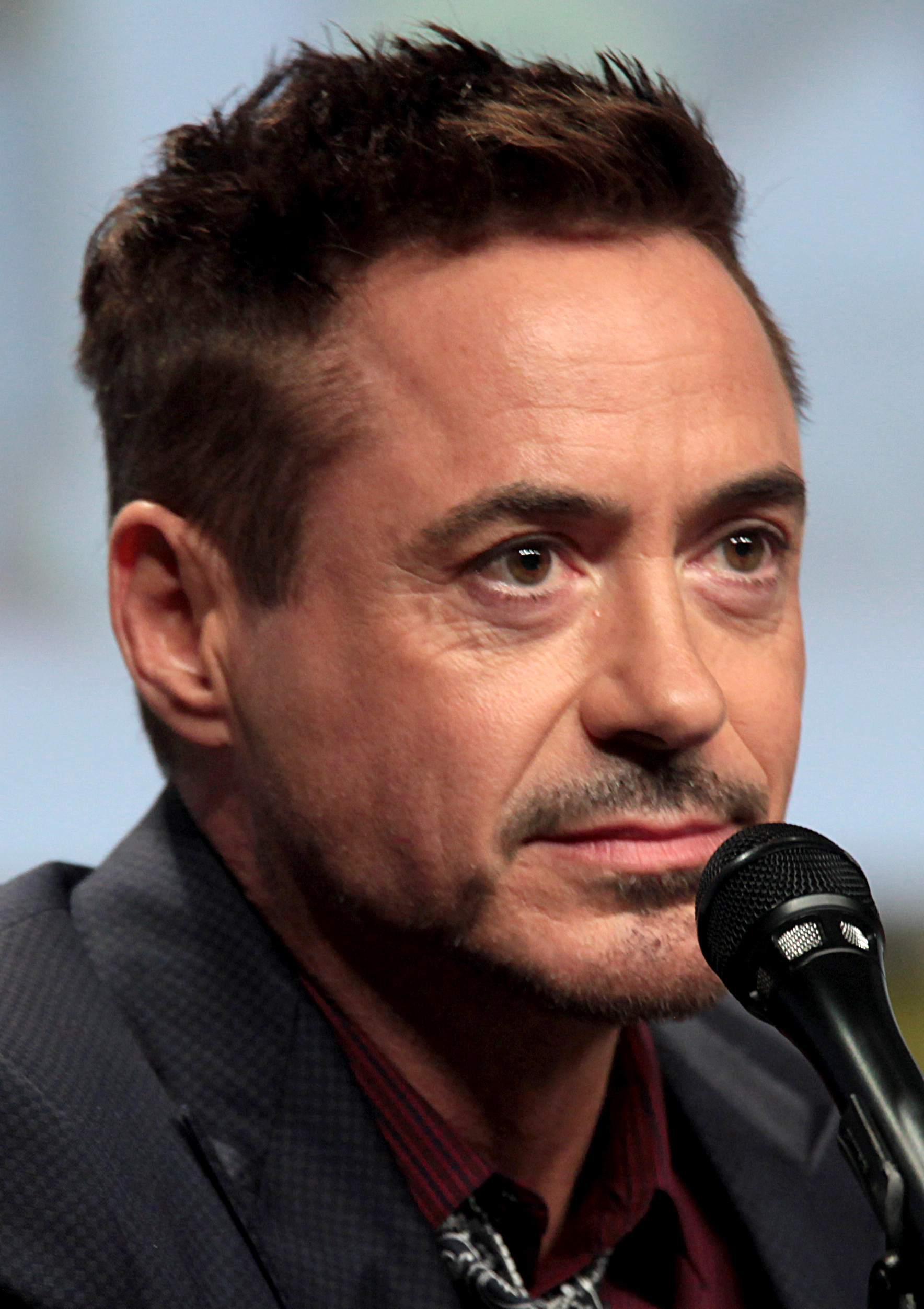
Robert Downey Jr., Best Actor in a Supporting Role in a Series, Miniseries & Limited Series, or Motion Picture Made for Television winner

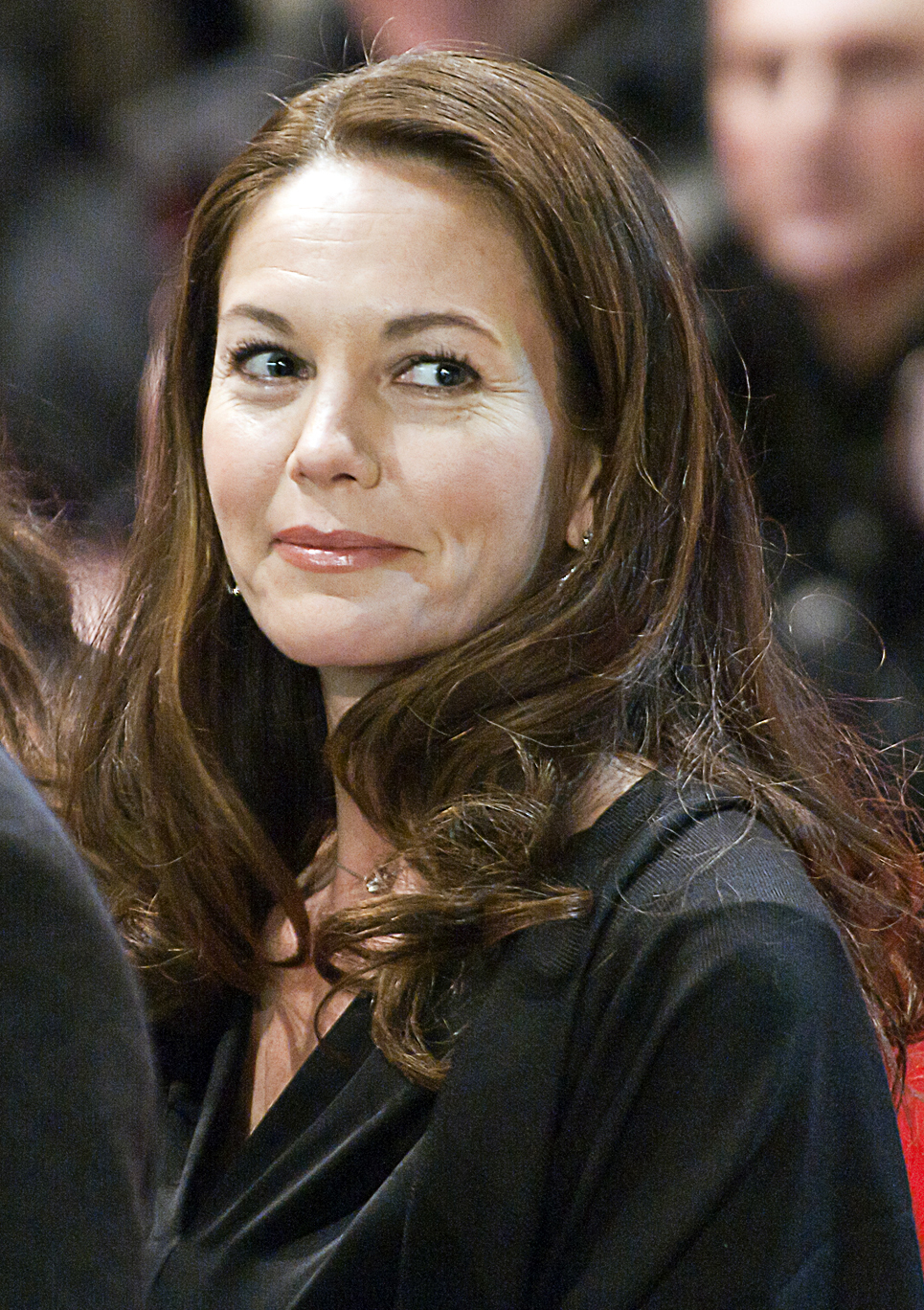
Diane Lane, Best Actress in a Supporting Role in a Series, Miniseries & Limited Series, or Motion Picture Made for Television winner

Winners are listed first and highlighted in bold.

Best Drama Series	Best Comedy or Musical Series
**Slow Horses (Apple TV+)**; The Diplomat (Netflix); Matlock (CBS); Shōgun (FX / Hulu); Squid Game (Netflix)	**Hacks (HBO Max)**; Abbott Elementary (ABC); The Curse (Paramount+); English Teacher (FX / Hulu); Only Murders in the Building (ABC); Platonic (Apple TV+)
Best Genre Series	Best Miniseries & Limited Series or Motion Picture Made for Television
**What We Do in the Shadows (FX / Hulu)**; Martin Scorsese Presents: The Saints (Fox Nation); Mr. & Mrs. Smith (Prime Video); Silo (Apple TV+)	**Ripley (Netflix)**; Baby Reindeer (Netflix); Feud: Capote vs. The Swans (FX / Hulu); Masters of the Air (Apple TV+); The Penguin (HBO Max); The Sympathizer (HBO)
Best Actor in a Drama or Genre Series	Best Actress in a Drama or Genre Series
**Hiroyuki Sanada – Shōgun as Lord Yoshii Toranaga (FX / Hulu)**; Donald Glover – Mr. & Mrs. Smith as John Smith / Michael (Prime Video); Jake Gyllenhaal – Presumed Innocent as Rusty Sabich (Apple TV+); Gary Oldman – Slow Horses as Jackson Lamb (Apple TV+); Eddie Redmayne – The Day of the Jackal as The Jackal (Peacock); Billy Bob Thornton – Landman as Tommy Norris (Paramount+)	**Kathy Bates – Matlock as Madeline "Matty" Matlock / Madeline Kingston (CBS)**; Carrie Coon – The Gilded Age as Bertha Russell (HBO); Maya Erskine – Mr. & Mrs. Smith as Jane Smith / Alana (Prime Video); Keri Russell – The Diplomat as Kate Wyler (Netflix); Anna Sawai – Shōgun as Toda Mariko (FX / Hulu); Imelda Staunton – The Crown as Queen Elizabeth II (Netflix)
Best Actor in a Comedy or Musical Series	Best Actress in a Comedy or Musical Series
**Patrick Brammall – Colin from Accounts as Gordon "Flash" Crapp (Paramount+)**; Adam Brody – Nobody Wants This as Noah Roklov (Netflix); Nathan Fielder – The Curse as Asher Siegel (Paramount+); Seth Rogen – Platonic as Will (Apple TV+); Martin Short – Only Murders in the Building as Oliver Putnam (ABC); Jeremy Allen White – The Bear as Carmen "Carmy" Berzatto (FX / Hulu)	**Emma Stone – The Curse as Whitney Siegel (Paramount+)**; Kristen Bell – Nobody Wants This as Joanne (Netflix); Quinta Brunson – Abbott Elementary as Janine Teagues (ABC); Ayo Edebiri – The Bear as Sydney Adamu (FX / Hulu); Selena Gomez – Only Murders in the Building as Mabel Mora (ABC); Jean Smart – Hacks as Deborah Vance (HBO Max)
Best Actor in a Miniseries, Limited Series, or Motion Picture Made for Television	Best Actress in a Miniseries, Limited Series, or Motion Picture Made for Television
**Colin Farrell – The Penguin as Oswald "Oz" Cobb / The Penguin (HBO Max)**; Richard Gadd – Baby Reindeer as Donny Dunn (Netflix); Tom Hollander – Feud: Capote vs. The Swans as Truman Capote (FX / Hulu); Andrew Scott – Ripley as Tom Ripley (Netflix); Callum Turner – Masters of the Air as Major John "Bucky" Egan (Apple TV+); Hoa Xuande – The Sympathizer as The Captain (HBO)	**Cate Blanchett – Disclaimer as Catherine Ravenscroft (Apple TV+)**; Jodie Foster – True Detective: Night Country as Chief Liz Danvers (HBO); Jessica Gunning – Baby Reindeer as Martha Scott (Netflix); Nicole Kidman – Expats as Margaret Woo (Prime Video); Cristin Milioti – The Penguin as Sofia Falcone (HBO Max); Naomi Watts – Feud: Capote vs. The Swans as Babe Paley (FX / Hulu)
Best Actor in a Supporting Role in a Series, Miniseries & Limited Series, or Motion Picture Made for Television	Best Actress in a Supporting Role in a Series, Miniseries & Limited Series, or Motion Picture Made for Television
**Robert Downey Jr. – The Sympathizer as Claude, Professor Robert Hammer, Ned Godwin, Miko Damianos, and The Priest (HBO)**; Tadanobu Asano – Shōgun as Kashigi Yabushige (FX / Hulu); Walton Goggins – Fallout as The Ghoul / Cooper Howard (Prime Video); Ebon Moss-Bachrach – The Bear as Richard "Richie" Jerimovich (FX / Hulu); Chris Perfetti – Abbott Elementary as Jacob Hill (ABC); Benny Safdie – The Curse as Dougie Schecter (Paramount+)	**Diane Lane – Feud: Capote vs. The Swans as Slim Keith (FX / Hulu)**; Hannah Einbinder – Hacks as Ava Daniels (HBO Max); Moeka Hoshi – Shōgun as Usami Fuji (FX / Hulu); Nava Mau – Baby Reindeer as Teri (Netflix); Saskia Reeves – Slow Horses as Catherine Standish (Apple TV+); Kristen Schaal – What We Do in the Shadows as The Guide (FX / Hulu)

=== Series with multiple nominations ===
Nominations	Series
5	Shōgun
4	Baby Reindeer
4	The Curse
4	Feud: Capote vs. The Swans
3	Abbott Elementary
3	The Bear
3	Hacks
3	Mr. & Mrs. Smith
3	Only Murders in the Building
3	The Penguin
3	Slow Horses
3	The Sympathizer
2	The Diplomat
2	Masters of the Air
2	Matlock
2	Nobody Wants This
2	Platonic
2	Ripley
2	What We Do in the Shadows

=== Series with multiple wins ===
Wins	Series
2	Feud: Capote vs. The Swans
