= Accolades received by Wicked =

Accolades received by Wicked may refer to:

- Accolades received by Wicked (musical)
  - Accolades received by Wicked (2024 film)
    - Accolades received by Wicked (score)
- Accolades received by Wicked (1998 film)

== See also ==
- Wicked (disambiguation)
