= Sarah Nuth =

British hairstylist and make-up artist

- Occupations: Hairstylist, make-up artist

Sarah Nuth is a British hairstylist and make-up artist. She was nominated for an Academy Award in the category Best Makeup and Hairstyling for the film Wicked.

In addition to her Academy Award nomination, she was nominated for a Primetime Emmy Award in the category Outstanding Period and/or Character Hairstyling for her work on the television program The Crown. Her nomination was shared with Cate Hall, Louise Coles, Suzanne David and Catriona Johnstone.

== Selected filmography ==
- Wicked (2024; co-nominated with Frances Hannon and Laura Blount)
