= Laura Blount =

British hairstylist and make-up artist

- Occupation(s): Hairstylist, make-up artist

Laura Blount is a British hairstylist and make-up artist. She was nominated for an Academy Award in the category Best Makeup and Hairstyling for the film Wicked.

== Selected filmography ==
- Wicked (2024; co-nominated with Frances Hannon and Sarah Nuth)
