= Nancy Nugent Title =

American sound editor

- Occupation: Sound editor

Nancy Nugent Title is an American sound editor. She was nominated for an Academy Award in the category Best Sound for the film Wicked.

In addition to her Academy Award nomination, she won two Primetime Emmy Awards and was nominated for another one in the category Outstanding Sound Editing for her work on the television programs When Dinosaurs Roamed America, Before We Ruled the Earth and Dinosaur Planet.

== Selected filmography ==
- Wicked (2024; co-nominated with Simon Hayes, Jack Dolman, Andy Nelson and John Marquis)
