= Jack Dolman =

Canadian sound editor

- Born: Toronto, Ontario, Canada
- Occupation: Sound editor
- Parent(s): Bob Dolman (father); Andrea Martin (mother)
- Relatives: Nancy Dolman (paternal aunt); Martin Short ( paternal marital-uncle)

Jack Dolman is a Canadian sound editor. He was nominated for an Academy Award in the category Best Sound for the film Wicked.

== Selected filmography ==
- Wicked (2024; co-nominated with Simon Hayes, Nancy Nugent Title, Andy Nelson and John Marquis)
