= List of awards and nominations received by Wicked (musical) =

Wicked (known in full as Wicked: The Untold Story of the Witches of Oz) is a stage musical with music and lyrics by Stephen Schwartz and a book by Winnie Holzman. It is based on the 1995 Gregory Maguire novel Wicked: The Life and Times of the Wicked Witch of the West (1995), which serves as a revisionist parallel novel to L. Frank Baum's classic story The Wonderful Wizard of Oz (1900) and the 1939 film The Wizard of Oz. Wicked tells the story of Elphaba Thropp and Galinda Upland, two young women in the Land of Oz who are pushed into becoming the Wicked Witch of the West and Glinda the Good, respectively. The musical was produced by Marc Platt, Jon B. Platt and David Stone through Universal Stage Productions, with direction by Joe Mantello and choreography by Wayne Cilento.

Although the original Broadway production received mixed reviews and was initially panned by The New York Times, audience reception was much more positive. The success of Wicked on Broadway resulted in subsequent productions in Chicago, Los Angeles, London's West End, and San Francisco, as well as international productions in Japan, Germany, Australia and elsewhere. Additionally, two North American tours have visited over thirty cities in the United States and Canada. The show celebrated its 20th anniversary on October 30, 2023, and is currently the fourth-longest-running Broadway show in history, having played 7,774 performances as of December 24, 2023. Wicked has broken box office records around the world, holding weekly-gross-takings records in New York, Los Angeles, Chicago, St. Louis, and London, and obtaining the record for biggest opening in the West End (£100,000 in the first hour on sale). In the week ending January 2, 2011, the London, Broadway, and both national touring productions all broke the record for the highest weekly gross. Both the West End production and the North American tour have been seen by over two million patrons. The original show was nominated for ten Tony Awards in 2004 and won three, including Best Actress in a Musical for Idina Menzel. It also won six Drama Desk Awards and one Grammy Award, while the London show has been the recipient of five Laurence Olivier Award nominations, winning one.

== Awards and nominations ==
=== Original Broadway production ===
Since its opening on October 30, 2003, the original Broadway production of Wicked has been consecutively nominated every year for at least one award. Accruing 64 nominations in 8 years, this production has won 33 of them. Amongst these 64 nominations include 10 Tony Awards (including the Tony Award for Best Musical), a Grammy Award for Best Musical Theater Album, 11 Drama Desk Awards, and 10 Outer Critics Circle Awards.

Year	Award ceremony	Category	Nominee	Result
2004	Tony Awards	Best Musical		Nominated
2004	Tony Awards	Best Original Score	Stephen Schwartz	Nominated
2004	Tony Awards	Best Book of a Musical	Winnie Holzman	Nominated
2004	Tony Awards	Best Actress in a Musical	Idina Menzel	Won
2004	Tony Awards	Best Actress in a Musical	Kristin Chenoweth	Nominated
2004	Tony Awards	Best Choreography	Wayne Cilento	Nominated
2004	Tony Awards	Best Orchestrations	William David Brohn	Nominated
2004	Tony Awards	Best Scenic Design	Eugene Lee	Won
2004	Tony Awards	Best Costume Design	Susan Hilferty	Won
2004	Tony Awards	Best Lighting Design	Kenneth Posner	Nominated
2004	Drama Desk Awards	Outstanding Musical		Won
2004	Drama Desk Awards	Outstanding Music	Stephen Schwartz	Nominated
2004	Drama Desk Awards	Outstanding Lyrics	Stephen Schwartz	Won
2004	Drama Desk Awards	Outstanding Book of a Musical	Winnie Holzman	Won
2004	Drama Desk Awards	Outstanding Actress in a Musical	Kristin Chenoweth	Nominated
2004	Drama Desk Awards	Outstanding Actress in a Musical	Idina Menzel	Nominated
2004	Drama Desk Awards	Outstanding Director of a Musical	Joe Mantello	Won
2004	Drama Desk Awards	Outstanding Orchestrations	William David Brohn	Won
2004	Drama Desk Awards	Outstanding Set Design	Eugene Lee	Won
2004	Drama Desk Awards	Outstanding Costume Design	Susan Hilferty	Won
2004	Drama Desk Awards	Outstanding Lighting Design	Kenneth Posner	Nominated
2004	Drama League Awards	Distinguished Production of a Musical		Won
2004	Drama League Awards	Distinguished Performance	Kristin Chenoweth	Nominated
2004	Drama League Awards	Distinguished Performance	Idina Menzel	Nominated
2004	Outer Critics Circle Awards	Outstanding Broadway Musical		Won
2004	Outer Critics Circle Awards	Outstanding Actress in a Musical	Kristin Chenoweth	Nominated
2004	Outer Critics Circle Awards	Outstanding Actress in a Musical	Idina Menzel	Nominated
2004	Outer Critics Circle Awards	Outstanding Featured Actor in a Musical	Joel Grey	Nominated
2004	Outer Critics Circle Awards	Outstanding Featured Actress in a Musical	Carole Shelley	Nominated
2004	Outer Critics Circle Awards	Outstanding Director of a Musical	Joe Mantello	Won
2004	Outer Critics Circle Awards	Outstanding Choreography	Wayne Cilento	Nominated
2004	Outer Critics Circle Awards	Outstanding Set Design	Eugene Lee	Won
2004	Outer Critics Circle Awards	Outstanding Costume Design	Susan Hilferty	Won
2004	Outer Critics Circle Awards	Outstanding Lighting Design	Kenneth Posner	Nominated
2004	Eddy Awards	Outstanding Costume Design	Susan Hilferty	Won
2005	Grammy Awards	Best Musical Show Album	Wicked (Original Broadway Cast Recording)	Won

=== North American tours ===
The North American tours have been nominated 15 times for various awards, winning 13 of them.

Year	Award ceremony	Category	Nominee	Result
2006	Carbonell Awards	Best Non-Resident Production		Won
2006	Carbonell Awards	Best Non-Resident Actress	Stephanie J. Block	Won
2006	Carbonell Awards	Best Non-Resident Supporting Actor	David Garrison	Won
2006	Carbonell Awards	Best Non-Resident Director	Joe Mantello	Won
2006	Carbonell Awards	Best Non-Resident Scenic Design	Eugene Lee	Won
2006	Carbonell Awards	Best Non-Resident Costume Design	Susan Hilferty	Won
2006	Carbonell Awards	Best Non-Resident Lighting Design	Kenneth Posner	Won
2006	Helen Hayes Awards	Outstanding Non-Resident Production		Nominated
2006	Helen Hayes Awards	Outstanding Lead Actress in a Non-Resident Production	Stephanie J. Block	Won
2006	Helen Hayes Awards	Outstanding Lead Actress in a Non-Resident Production	Kendra Kassebaum	Nominated
2006	Touring Broadway Awards	Best New Musical		Won
2006	Touring Broadway Awards	Best Musical Score	Stephen Schwartz	Won
2006	Touring Broadway Awards	Best Production Design	Eugene Lee, Susan Hilferty, Kenneth Posner	Won

=== Chicago production ===
The Chicago production of Wicked received 5 Joseph Jefferson Award nominations in 2006.

Year	Award ceremony	Category	Nominee	Result
2006	Joseph Jefferson Awards	Outstanding Production – Musical		Nominated
2006	Joseph Jefferson Awards	Outstanding Actress in a Principal Role – Musical	Ana Gasteyer	Nominated
2006	Joseph Jefferson Awards	Outstanding Actress in a Principal Role – Musical	Kate Reinders	Nominated
2006	Joseph Jefferson Awards	Outstanding Actress in a Supporting Role – Musical	Rondi Reed	Nominated
2006	Joseph Jefferson Awards	Outstanding Director – Musical	Joe Mantello	Nominated

=== London production ===
Like the original Broadway production, the London production of Wicked has been consecutively nominated each year since its opening in 2006. This production has garnered a total of 25 nominations, winning 13 of them. The production has been nominated 5 times for a Laurence Olivier Award and eventually won one in 2010. In addition, the production regularly appears on audience choice award ceremonies.

Year	Award ceremony	Category	Nominee	Result
2007	Laurence Olivier Awards	Best Director	Joe Mantello	Nominated
2007	Laurence Olivier Awards	Best Costume Design	Susan Hilferty	Nominated
2007	Laurence Olivier Awards	Best Lighting Design	Kenneth Posner	Nominated
2007	Laurence Olivier Awards	Best Set Design	Eugene Lee	Nominated
2009	Women of the Future Awards	Women of the Future Art and Culture	Alexia Khadime and Dianne Pilkington	Won

=== Melbourne production ===
The production of Wicked in Melbourne has garnered 24 nominations, winning 10 of them.

Year	Award ceremony	Category	Nominee	Result
2008	Green Room Awards	Best Musical		Nominated
2008	Green Room Awards	Best Leading Actress in a Musical	Lucy Durack	Nominated
2008	Green Room Awards	Best Leading Actress in a Musical	Amanda Harrison	Nominated
2008	Green Room Awards	Best Featured Actress in a Musical	Penny McNamee	Won
2008	Green Room Awards	Best Director of a Musical	Lisa Leguilliou	Nominated
2008	Green Room Awards	Best Choreography of a Musical	Wayne Cilento	Nominated
2008	Green Room Awards	Best Musical Direction of a Musical	Kellie Dickerson	Won
2008	Green Room Awards	Best Artistic Direction of a Musical	Susan Hilferty and Eugene Lee	Won
2008	Green Room Awards	Best Lighting and Sound of a Musical	Kenneth Posner	Won
2009	Helpmann Awards	Best Musical		Won
2009	Helpmann Awards	Best Original Score	Stephen Schwartz	Nominated
2009	Helpmann Awards	Best Female Actor in a Musical	Lucy Durack	Nominated
2009	Helpmann Awards	Best Female Actor in a Musical	Amanda Harrison	Nominated
2009	Helpmann Awards	Best Male Actor in a Supporting Role in a Musical	Rob Guest	Won
2009	Helpmann Awards	Best Female Actor in a Supporting Role in a Musical	Maggie Kirkpatrick	Nominated
2009	Helpmann Awards	Best Direction of a Musical	Lisa Leguillou	Won
2009	Helpmann Awards	Best Choreography in a Musical	Wayne Cilento	Won
2009	Helpmann Awards	Best Scenic Design	Eugene Lee	Won
2009	Helpmann Awards	Best Costume Design	Susan Hilferty	Won
2009	Helpmann Awards	Best Lighting Design	Kenneth Posner	Nominated
2009	Helpmann Awards	Best Sound Design	Tony Meola	Nominated
2009	Sydney Theatre Awards	Best Production of a Musical		Nominated
2009	Sydney Theatre Awards	Best Performance by an Actress in a Musical	Lucy Durack	Nominated
2009	Sydney Theatre Awards	Best Performance by an Actress in a Musical	Amanda Harrison	Nominated

=== Brazilian production ===
The production of Wicked in Brazil has garnered 40 nominations, winning 17 of them.

Year	Award ceremony	Category	Nominee	Result
2016	Bibi Ferreira Awards	Best Musical		Won
2016	Bibi Ferreira Awards	Best Adaptation of a Musical	Mariana Elisabetsky and Victor Mühlethaler	Nominated
2016	Bibi Ferreira Awards	Best Actress in a Musical	Fabi Bang	Won
2016	Bibi Ferreira Awards	Best Actress in a Musical	Myra Ruiz	Nominated
2016	Cenym Awards	Best Musical		Nominated
2016	Cenym Awards	Best Choreography		Nominated
2016	Cenym Awards	Best Original Song or Adapted	"Ódio (What Is This Feeling?)"	Nominated
2016	Arte Qualidade Brasil Awards	Best Musical		Won
2016	Arte Qualidade Brasil Awards	Best Actress in a Musical	Fabi Bang	Nominated
2016	Aplauso Brasil de Teatro Awards	Best Musical		Nominated
2016	Aplauso Brasil de Teatro Awards	Best Actress in a Musical	Fabi Bang	Nominated
2016	Musical Cast Awards	Best Musical		Won
2016	Musical Cast Awards	Best Musical by Popular Vote		Won
2016	Musical Cast Awards	Best Actress in a Musical	Fabi Bang	Nominated
2016	Musical Cast Awards	Best Actress in a Musical by Popular Vote	Fabi Bang	Won
2016	Musical Cast Awards	Best Sub/Swing in a Musical	Talita Real	Nominated
2016	Musical Cast Awards	Best Sub/Swing in a Musical	Rodrigo Negrini	Nominated
2016	Musical Cast Awards	Best Sub/Swing in a Musical	Thuany Parente	Nominated
2016	Musical Cast Awards	Best Sub/Swing in a Musical by Popular Vote	Talita Real	Nominated
2016	Musical Cast Awards	Best Sub/Swing in a Musical by Popular Vote	Rodrigo Negrini	Nominated
2016	Musical Cast Awards	Best Sub/Swing in a Musical by Popular Vote	Thuany Parente	Won
2016	Musical Cast Awards	Best Production of a Foreign Musical		Won
2016	Musical Cast Awards	Best Production of a Foreign Musical by Popular Vote		Won
2016	Musical Cast Awards	Best Production	T4F Entretenimento	Won
2016	Musical Cast Awards	Best Production by Popular Vote	T4F Entretenimento	Won
2016	Musical Cast Awards	Best Couple	Myra Ruiz and Jonatas Faro	Nominated
2016	Musical Cast Awards	Best Couple by Popular Vote	Myra Ruiz and Jonatas Faro	Won
2016	Musical Cast Awards	Best Solo	"Desafiar a Gravidade" by Myra Ruiz	Won
2016	Musical Cast Awards	Best Solo by Popular Vote	"Desafiar a Gravidade" by Myra Ruiz	Won
2016	Musical Cast Awards	Best Choir	"Venha Ver" by Ensemble	Nominated
2016	Musical Cast Awards	Best Choir by Popular Vote	"Venha Ver" by Ensemble	Won
2016	Musical Cast Awards	Best Adaptation	Mariana Elisabetsky and Victor Mühlethaler	Won
2016	Musical Cast Awards	Best Adaptation by Popular Vote	Mariana Elisabetsky and Victor Mühlethaler	Nominated
2017	Quem Awards	Best Musical		Won
2017	Quem Awards	Best Actress in a Musical	Myra Ruiz	Nominated
2017	Prêmio Reverência	Best Play		Nominated
2017	Prêmio Reverência	Best Play by Popular Vote		Nominated
2017	Prêmio Reverência	Best Actress in a Musical	Fabi Bang	Nominated
2017	Prêmio Reverência	Best Actress in a Musical	Myra Ruiz	Nominated
2017	Prêmio Reverência	Special Category	Mariana Elisabetsky and Victor Mühlethaler for Wicked adaptation	Nominated
