= John Marquis (sound engineer) =

American sound engineer

- Occupation: Sound engineer

John Marquis is an American sound engineer. He was nominated for an Academy Award in the category Best Sound for the film Wicked.

== Selected filmography ==
- Wicked (2024; co-nominated with Simon Hayes, Nancy Nugent Title, Jack Dolman and Andy Nelson)
