= Frances Hannon =

- Other name: Francis Hannon
- Occupation: Makeup artist
- Years active: 1983-present

Frances Hannon is a make-up artist. She won Academy Award for Best Makeup and Hairstyling for the 2014 film The Grand Budapest Hotel at the 87th Academy Awards. Her win was shared with Mark Coulier. She has also worked on the 2024 film Wicked Part One for which she was nominated again.
