= Simon Hayes (sound engineer) =

British production sound mixer

- Occupation: Production sound mixer
- Years active: 1995–present
- Website: simonhayes.com

Simon Hayes is a British production sound mixer. He won the Academy Award for Best Sound Mixing and the BAFTA Award for Best Sound for his work on Les Misérables (2012). He earned two further nominations in those categories for his work on No Time to Die (2021) and Wicked (2024).

== Career ==
After starting work as a runner for a commercial production company when he was 16 years old, Hayes moved into the sound department as an assistant and then boom operator, before mixing his first feature film, Lock, Stock and Two Smoking Barrels at the age of 27. Hayes was the production sound mixer for the 2012 epic period musical film Les Misérables, for which the Academy of Motion Picture Arts and Sciences awarded him the Oscar for Best Sound Mixing at the 85th Academy Awards, alongside Andy Nelson and Mark Paterson. The director Tom Hooper required all singing in the film to be recorded live, which was widely deemed to be impracticable. Hayes and his team undertook complex recording, editing and mixing processes to achieve Hooper's aim. They captured recordings of the actors amidst loud film sets, edited the vocals, then overdubbed the orchestration.

== Personal life ==
Hayes is a 4th degree Brazilian jiu-jitsu blackbelt and coaches at Carlson Gracie London. He also holds a 2nd dan blackbelt in Judo. Hayes raced BMX in the 1980s, winning the 1985 European BMX Championships in Barcelona.

== Awards ==
- 2008: Conch Award for Production Sound Mixer of the Year
- 2012: Conch Award for Production Sound Mixer of the Year
- 2012: Satellite Award for Best Sound (Editing and Mixing) for Les Misérables
- 2013: CAS Award for Outstanding Achievement in Sound Mixing for a Motion Picture – Live Action for Les Misérables
- 2013: BAFTA Award for Best Sound for Les Misérables
- 2013: Academy Award for Best Sound Mixing, Les Misérables
- 2024: Nikola Tesla Satellite Award for Visionary Achievement in Filmmaking Technology
- 2025: Satellite Award for Best Sound (Editing and Mixing) for Wicked

== Nominations ==
- 2017: BAFTA Award for Best Sound for Fantastic Beasts and Where to Find Them
- 2022: Academy Award for Best Sound for No Time to Die
- 2025: BAFTA Award for Best Sound for Wicked
- 2025: Academy Award for Best Sound for Wicked
- 2022: BAFTA Award for Best Sound for No Time to Die

== Filmography ==
BFI Filmography
Year	Title	Role
1998	Lock, Stock and Two Smoking Barrels	Sound recordist
1999	Fanny and Elvis	Production sound mixer
2000	Snatch	Sound mixer
2002	Birthday Girl	Additional UK shooting crew
2002	Mean Machine	Sound mixer
2003	Swept Away	Production sound mixer
2004	Bridget Jones: The Edge of Reason	Production sound mixer
2004	Layer Cake	Sound mixer
2004	Shaun of the Dead	Sound recordist
2004	The Calcium Kid	Production sound mixer
2005	Nanny McPhee	Production sound mixer
2005	Revolver	Sound recordist
2006	Sixty Six “A True…Ish Story”	Production sound mixer
2007	28 Weeks Later	Production sound mixer
2007	Copying Beethoven	Production sound mixer
2007	Stardust	Production sound mixer
2008	Incendiary	Production sound mixer
2008	Mamma Mia!	Production sound mixer
2008	The Bank Job	Production sound mixer
2009	Franklyn	Production sound mixer
2009	Harry Brown	Production sound mixer
2009	Lesbian Vampire Killers	Production sound mixer
2010	Green Zone	Production sound mixer
2010	Kick-Ass	Production sound mixer
2010	Nanny McPhee and the Big Bang	Production sound mixer
2011	X-Men: First Class	Production sound mixer
2012	Bel Ami	Production sound mixer
2012	Prometheus	Production sound mixer
2012	'Les Misérables'	Production sound mixer
2013	The Counselor	Production sound mixer
2013	Trance	Production sound mixer
2014	Before I Go to Sleep	Production sound mixer
2014	Guardians of the Galaxy	Production sound mixer
2015	Kingsman: The Secret Service	Production sound mixer
2016	Allied	Production sound mixer
2016	Fantastic Beasts and Where to Find Them	Production sound mixer
2017	The Legend of Tarzan	Production sound mixer
2017	Eat Locals	Sound consultant
2017	King Arthur: Legend of the Sword	Production sound mixer
2017	Life	Production sound mixer
2018	Cats	Production sound mixer
2019	Aladdin	Production sound mixer
2019	Yesterday	Production sound mixer
2021	No Time to Die	Production sound mixer
2023	The Little Mermaid	Production sound mixer
2024	Argylle	Production sound mixer
2024	Wicked	Production sound mixer
2025	Snow White	Production sound mixer
