= Water tree =

Water tree may refer to:

- Electrical treeing
- Grevillea berryana
- Hakea leucoptera
