= Richard James Arthur Berry =

British-born surgeon and anatomist (1867 – 1962)

- Born: May 30, 1867; Upholland, Lancashire, England
- Died: September 30, 1962 (aged 95); Clifton, Bristol, England
- Education: University of Edinburgh (MB ChM, MD)
- Known for: Professor of Anatomy at the University of Melbourne, research on human skull morphology
- Spouse: Beatrice Catherine Brighouse
- Awards: Fellow of the Royal Society of Edinburgh (FRSE)
- Scientific career
- Fields: Anatomy, neurology, anthropology
- Workplaces: University of Melbourne, Stoke Park Mental Hospital

Richard James Arthur Berry FRSE FRCSE (1867–1962) was a British-born surgeon, anatomist and eugenicist who was well-known in Australia.

== Early life ==
Berry was born on 30 May 1867, in Upholland in Lancashire, the son of Jane Barlow and James Berry, a coal-merchant. His father died before he was born, and he was largely raised by his grandfather. He was educated at small private schools in Southport, beginning at Dame’s School and then in 1877 going onto a private school for boys before winning a place at the University of Cambridge. However, he did not take up his place at the university, instead taking an apprenticeship with a firm of shipbrokers in Liverpool. After some time Berry was granted permission to terminate his contract. In May 1886 he entered the University of Edinburgh to study medicine, graduating with an MBChM in 1891.

Berry then took up a role of House Surgeon under Thomas Annandale, Regius professor of clinical surgery at Edinburgh Royal Infirmary on Lauriston Place. In the same year Berry was elected President of the Royal Medical Society of Edinburgh. The following year Berry was appointed lecturer in anatomy at the School of Medicine of the Royal Colleges of Edinburgh. On receipt of his MD in 1894 he had written a prize-winning thesis on the Vermiform appendix. Berry was held in very high regard within the institution and was a greatly respected and well established academic.

In 1895, Berry was elected a Fellow of the Royal College of Surgeons of Edinburgh and the following year began to lecture in anatomy at the University of Edinburgh. In 1897 he was elected a Fellow of the Royal Society of Edinburgh.

== Professor of anatomy ==
In December 1905 Berry was accepted for a role as Professor of Anatomy at Melbourne University and travelled over with his wife in February 1906 to replace Sir Harry Brookes Allen in his role of Head of Anatomy. The style of teaching was revolutionised by Berry. He taught until 1929. He also served as Honorary Psychiatrist at Melbourne Children’s Hospital. After settling into his new role he became interested in studies of the skulls of the Aboriginals. His collection of skulls and bones was rediscovered in 2003. From this he developed a further interest in the skulls of mentally deficient children. From here he became a consultant psychiatrist to the Royal Melbourne Children’s Hospital in Parkville, close to the University of Melbourne. He was a proponent of eugenics, supporting the killing of "the grosser types of our mental defectives".

In 1923 a new Anatomy Department was opened at Melbourne University, and was nicknamed ‘’Berry’s Folly’’’ on account of what was thought to be its over-size, but this proved to be prudent foresight once class sizes swelled after the Second World War.

From 1925 to 1929 Berry was the Dean of the Faculty. He strongly advocated a closer physical relationship between the university and the hospital. However this met with opposition from Sir James Barrett. However, in 1927 he toured hospitals of North America with Sir Stanley Argyle the Premier of Victoria, and this ultimately led to the plan being adopted.

== Later life ==
In 1929 Berry unexpectedly resigned and returned to Britain to take up the role as Head of Medical Services at Stoke Park Mental Hospital near Bristol in England. He also then took chairmanship of the Burden Mental Research Trust. He represented Queensland and New South Wales in his membership of the council of the British Medical Association. He continued studies into mental deficiency until 1940.

In 1959, Sir William Upjohn persuaded Melbourne University to grant Berry the title of Professor emeritus, and Berry, by then virtually blind, returned to receive this honour.

Berry died on 30 September 1962 at Clifton, Bristol.

== Controversy ==
Berry was strongly associated with and a vocal supporter of the eugenics movement in Melbourne. He conducted craniometric analysis on the skulls of Aboriginal Australians and people with disabilities with a view towards establishing a relationship between cranium size and intelligence. It was Berry’s intentions to showcase the comparative superiority of certain individuals and of the 'white' race more generally. Berry’s research involved the collection of Aboriginal ancestral remains. His collection is known as the ‘Berry collection and consisted of 400 Aboriginal remains, many of which were taken from traditional graves without consent from traditional custodians. These remains were only rediscovered and made public knowledge in 2003.

In 1906 The Bulletin published a letter protesting at any ‘breathing of regret’ that the Aboriginal population was dying out (Cawte 1986, p. 44), the article queried whether it ‘isn’t it a desirable thing that the inferior races should die out … There isn’t so much spare room on this earth for even the best races…’.

Macdonald states that it is widely believed that Berry left Melbourne because he had made “powerful enemies” (Macdonald 2017, p. 5). Thereafter his work was carried out in Stoke Park as chairman of the Burden Mental Research Trust where he conducted research regarding ‘the problems underlying the cause and inheritance of normal and abnormal mentality’.

In March 2017 a group of staff and students from the University of Melbourne led a successful anti-racism campaign to rename the Richard Berry Building for Mathematics and Statistics. As a consequence of this campaign, the University of Melbourne Mathematics & Statistics building was re-named in honour of the “worthy University of Melbourne alumni and great scholar” Peter Gavin Hall. Campaigner's claim that this represented a positive step towards reconciliation and that it is in accordance with the university’s Reconciliation Action Plan which seeks to achieve appropriate recognition of the contributions of Indigenous Australians.

== Family ==
On 7 August 1900 Berry married Beatrice Catherine Brighouse (d.1949), daughter of Sir Samuel Brighouse, whom he had met through his hobby of cycling and mountain climbing. His daughter Beatrice married Professor Ian Maxwell of Melbourne.

== Memorials ==
Berry's portrait, by Justus Jorgensen, hangs in the Anatomy Department of Melbourne University. The building housing the anatomy department at Melbourne University was named the Richard Berry Building in his honour. The building was later used by the Melbourne's mathematics department. Following protests centered around Berry's racist and eugenicist views, the name of the building was changed in March 2017 to instead honour recently deceased mathematician Peter Hall.

The Western Australian plant, Grevillea berryana was named in his honour by Alfred James Ewart and Jean White.

== Publications ==
- Transactions of the Royal Society of Victoria: "On the Tasmanian crania" (1909)
- ’’A Clinical Atlas of Sectional and Topographical Anatomy’’ (1911)
- Transactions of the Royal Society of Victoria: "On the Australian crania" (1914)
- "Practical Anatomy" (1914)
- "Brain and Mind" (1928)
- Report on mental deficiency in Victoria (1929)
- "A Cerebral Atlas of Normal and Defective Brains" (1938)
- "Your Brain and Its Story" (1939)
