= Metropolitan Community Church London =

Coordinates: 51.443844°N 0.147243°W

Metropolitan Community Church London (MCC London) was the first Metropolitan Community Church congregation in Europe and the first one chartered out of the United States. The congregation was founded in 1972 as the Fellowship of Christ Liberator and at least a year later a majority indicated that they wished to affiliate with the MCC. The then minister, the Revd Tony Cross, resigned and Peter Embrey did not wish to continue to host the congregation. The name was changed and they went on to occupy a location on Sistova Road, in the Balham neighbourhood of South London. MCC London no longer exists as a congregation, but was the source (directly or indirectly) of three other congregations: MCC North London, MCC East London, and MCC South London. MCC churches have a "primary ministry in gay, lesbian, bisexual, transgender and queer communities, providing a safe-space environment of an accepting congregation where people can find God's salvation, personal support, spiritual growth and guidance toward health and wholeness." The churches have been active in efforts to support marriage for LGBTQ people and specifically reach out to LGBTQ families. They have also supported efforts to educate and combat violence against LGBTQ people.

== MCC North London ==
Mcc North London is located in Camden. MCC North London began as a Bible study in the early 1980s sponsored by the then existing MCC London church. They gained chartered church status within the Universal Fellowship of MCC and the founding pastor was the Reverend Elder Hong Tan. In response to the early AIDS pandemic they launched a programme called 'God's Love We Deliver' (independent of the one in New York City), which became the independent charity The Food Chain. Reverend Elder Gill Storey, Rev. Tan's successor, continuing the social justice ministries throughout the 1990s, Tan became pastor again following Storey until the Reverend Pressley Sutherland became pastor beginning Easter 2001. Before legalised civil partnerships for same-sex and transgender couples, MCC North London hosted The Blessing Tent at London Pride for several years, during which time more than 500 couples were "Blessed and affirmed into Holy Union as a public witness and demonstration of the validity of such partnerships". In December 2005 a vicar for the church and her partner became the first "same-sex couple to be legally married in Britain" after the passage of the Civil Partnership Bill. In 2008, under the interim pastorship of Rev Sharon Ferguson The group has continued to advocate for LGBTQ issues including a call for sensitivity training in Jamaica following many attacks and several murders of lesbians and gays.

== MCC East London ==
MCC East London is located in Stepney. MCC East London started as a project of MCC North London, "a parish extension group was established with the objective to form a church". MCC East London held its first service on Pentecost Sunday in 1991. In August 2010 Reverend Caroline Redfearn, a regular preacher for and active member of MCC East London, died from a cancer-related illness. In November 2004 she was the first African-Caribbean descent woman to be ordained at MCC in the United Kingdom.

== MCC South London ==
MCC South London was in Balham until its closure in 2015. Reverend Elder Jean White (1941–2010) was the longest serving non-American Pastor within MCC and the first non-American elected to the denomination's Board of Elders and began MCC in the UK. Having pastored the original MCC London for many years and having worked as the Director of World Church Extension of the denomination, she pastored MCC South London. The group is a member of The Surrey and London Association of Gay Organisations. In 2009 all three churches marched together as part of London's pride parade.

== See also ==
- LGBT-welcoming church programs
- Christianity and homosexuality

== Sources ==
- American Baptist Historical Society, Foundations, Volume 20, American Baptist Historical Society, 1977.
- Gooch, Brad, Godtalk: travels in spiritual America, A.A. Knopf, 2002, ISBN 0-679-44709-1, ISBN 978-0-679-44709-2.
- Walton, Tony, Out of the Shadows, 2010. Bona Street Press, ISBN 978-0-9566091-0-6.
- Wilcox, Melissa M., Coming out in Christianity: religion, identity, and community, Indiana University Press, 2003, ISBN 0-253-21619-2, ISBN 978-0-253-21619-9.
