= Grevillea berryana =

Conservation status
- Least Concern (IUCN 3.1)

Scientific classification
- Kingdom: Plantae
- Clade: Embryophytes
- Clade: Tracheophytes
- Clade: Spermatophytes
- Clade: Angiosperms
- Clade: Eudicots
- Order: Proteales
- Family: Proteaceae
- Genus: Grevillea
- Species: G. berryana

Binomial name
- Grevillea berryana Ewart & Jean White

Species of plant endemic to Western Australia

Grevillea berryana is a species of flowering plant in the family Proteaceae and is endemic to the Pilbara, Mid West and Goldfields regions of Western Australia. It is a shrub or tree with mostly divided leaves with linear lobes and clusters of pale cream-coloured to yellow flowers.

== Description ==
Grevillea berryana is a shrub or tree that typically grows to a height of 1.5–8 m (4 ft 11 in – 26 ft 3 in). Its leaves are pinnatipartite, 60–200 mm (2.4–7.9 in) long with two to seven linear lobes 40–150 mm (1.6–5.9 in) long and 0.7–2.0 mm (0.028–0.079 in) wide, or sometimes linear. The lower surface of the leaves has two longitudinal grooves. The flowers are arranged in cylindrical panicles 20–60 mm (0.79–2.36 in) long with two to six branches. The flowers, including the style are pale cream-coloured to yellow and the pistil is 10.5–13.0 mm (0.41–0.51 in) long. Flowering mainly occurs from December to February and the fruit is a glabrous follicle 10–17 mm (0.39–0.67 in) long.

== Taxonomy ==
Grevillea berryana was first formally described in 1909 by Alfred James Ewart and Jean White in the Proceedings of the Royal Society of Victoria from specimens collected by Frederick Arthur Rodway near Malcolm in 1907. The specific epithet (berryana) honours Richard James Arthur Berry.

== Distribution and habitat ==
This grevillea grows in a range of habitats from grassland to shrubland in flat to rocky places and is widely distributed between Menzies, the eastern Gibson Desert, Mount Magnet and the lower Fortescue River in northern Western Australia.

== Conservation status ==
Grevillea berryana is listed as not threatened by the Government of Western Australia Department of Biodiversity, Conservation and Attractions and as least concern on the IUCN Red List of Threatened Species.
