= Safe space =

Socially safe zone for communication

An inverted pink triangle, surrounded by a green circle symbolising universal acceptance, to indicate alliance with gay rights and spaces free from homophobia. This symbol was introduced at anti-homophobia workshops from the Gay & Lesbian Urban Explorers in 1989.

The term safe space refers to places "intended to be free of bias, conflict, criticism, or potentially threatening actions, ideas, or conversations", according to Merriam-Webster. The term originated in LGBTQ culture, but has since expanded to include any place where a marginalized minority (e.g., gender, racial, religious, ethnic) can come together to communicate regarding their shared experiences. Safe spaces are most commonly located on university campuses in the western world, but also are at workplaces, as in the case of Nokia.

The terms safe space (or safe-space), safer space, and positive space may also indicate that a teacher, educational institution or student body does not tolerate violence, harassment, or hate speech, thereby creating a safe place for marginalized people.

== Countries ==
=== Australia ===
The Islamic Council of Victoria (ICV) which says it represents 200,000 Muslims in Victoria stated that the Muslim community suffered mental health and other problems due to the suspicions to which it is subjected. The ICV proposed that Islamic community groups be given funds to create "safe spaces" where "inflammatory" issues could be discussed without being judged. The government rejected the proposal and instigated a review of government funding towards the ICV.

=== Canada ===
The Positive Space campaign was developed at the University of Toronto in 1995. Positive Space initiatives have become prevalent in post-secondary institutions across Canada, including the University of Western Ontario, McGill University, the University of Toronto, Algonquin College, the University of British Columbia, and Queen's University. The Government of Canada also has a positive spaces initiative that began in 2009 to support LGBTQIA+ immigrants, refugees, and newcomers.

In 2021, Justice Minister David Lametti sought to legislate the internet to be a safe space by introducing Bill C-36, which would remove hateful online content and issue fines to those who spread it, stating that the internet has become the new public square and "that public square should be a safe space".

In 2023, the Ontario New Democratic Party proposed legally enforced safe spaces in Ontario, with Bill 94 (2SLGBTQI+ Community Safety Zones Act). The legislation would make "offensive remarks" an offense subject to a fine up to $25,000 if done within 100 metres of an LGBTQ event designated by an attorney general.

=== Philippines ===
Republic Act No. 11313, known as the Safe Spaces Act or the "Bawal Bastos Law", authored by Senator Risa Hontiveros, was signed into law by President Rodrigo Duterte on April 17, 2019. Its implementing rules and regulations was signed by Hontiveros in October that year. The act aims to reform laws and policies surrounding gender-based street and public spaces harassment, both offline and online.

=== United Kingdom ===
In early 2015, the increasing adoption of safe spaces in UK universities aroused controversy due to accusations that they were used to stifle free speech and differing political views.

In September 2016, the then-Prime Minister, Theresa May, criticized universities for implementing "safe space" policies amid concerns that self-censorship was curtailing freedom of speech on campuses. The Prime Minister said it was "quite extraordinary" for universities to ban the discussion of certain topics that could cause offence. She warned that stifling free speech could have a negative impact on Britain's economic and social success.

=== United States ===
In the United States, the concept originated in the gay liberation movement and women's movement, where it "implies a certain license to speak and act freely, form collective strength, and generate strategies for resistance...a means rather than an end and not only a physical space but also a space created by the coming together of women searching for community." The first safe spaces were gay bars and consciousness raising groups.

In 1989 Gay & Lesbian Urban Explorers (GLUE) developed a safe spaces program. During their events including diversity-training sessions and antihomophobia workshops, they passed out magnets with an inverted pink triangle, "ACT UP's...symbol", surrounded by a green circle to "symbolize universal acceptance," and asked "allies to display the magnets to show support for gay rights and to designate their work spaces free from homophobia."

Advocates for Youth states on their website that a safe-space is "A place where anyone can relax and be fully self-expressed, without fear of being made to feel uncomfortable, unwelcome or challenged on account of biological sex, race/ethnicity, sexual orientation, gender identity or expression, cultural background, age, or physical or mental ability; a place where the rules guard each person's self-respect, dignity and feelings and strongly encourage everyone to respect others." However, some people consider safe space culture as a violation of the First Amendment and a mechanism for retreating from opinions which contrast with one's own.

In general, "safe space culture" may be individuals or institutions which support a safe space for LGBT+ students and employees. They may offer or mandate staff training on diversity, include being a safe space in the organization's mission statement, develop and post a value statement in the organization's office, online, or on printed documents, or, if part of a coalition, encourage the coalition to include being a safe space in its mission and values.

== Criticism ==
Opponents of safe spaces argue that the idea stifles freedom of speech, or blurs the line between security against physical harm and giving offense. In response, advocates for safe spaces assert that people subject to hate speech are directly affected by it.

In their 2015 essay in The Atlantic, "The Coddling of The American Mind", Jonathan Haidt and Greg Lukianoff warn of the rise of college campuses as safe spaces, and argue that valuing "emotional safety" as a sacred cause ignores practical and moral tradeoffs, exacerbates political polarization, and can stunt the emotional and intellectual development of students. Writing for The New York Times in 2015, journalist Judith Shulevitz distinguished between meetings where participants consent to provide a safe space and attempts to make entire dormitories or student newspapers safe spaces. According to Shulevitz, the latter is a logical consequence of the former: "Once you designate some spaces as safe, you imply that the rest are unsafe. It follows that they should be made safer." She gave the example of a safe space at Brown University, when libertarian Wendy McElroy, who was known for criticizing the term "rape culture", was invited to give a speech: "The safe space ... was intended to give people who might find comments 'troubling' or 'triggering,' a place to recuperate. The room was equipped with cookies, coloring books, bubbles, Play-Doh, calming music, pillows, blankets, soothers and a video of frolicking puppies, as well as students and staff members trained to deal with trauma." The same year, journalist Conor Friedersdorf criticized the use of outdoor safe spaces to block press coverage of student protests. According to Friedersdorf, such uses reverse the intent of safe spaces: "This behavior is a kind of safe-baiting: using intimidation or initiating physical aggression to violate someone's rights, then acting like your target is making you unsafe." Then-President Barack Obama also critiqued safe spaces as promoting intellectual disinterest:

Anybody who comes to speak to you and you disagree with, you should have an argument with 'em. But you shouldn't silence them by saying, 'You can't come because I'm too sensitive to hear what you have to say.' That's not the way we learn either.

In 2016, British actor and writer Stephen Fry criticized safe spaces and trigger warnings as infantilizing students and possibly eroding free speech. Frank Furedi of the Los Angeles Times and Candace Russell of HuffPost similarly stated that safe spaces contribute to echo chambers surrounded by like-minded people, insulating those inside said chambers from ideas that challenge or contradict their own. Other speakers who have criticized the concept of safe spaces at universities include philosopher Christina Hoff Sommers, and sociologist Tressie McMillan Cottom.

In 2016, the University of Chicago sent a letter welcoming new undergraduates, affirming its commitment to diversity, civility, and respect and informing them the college does not support trigger warnings, does not cancel controversial speakers, and does not "condone the creation of intellectual 'safe spaces' where individuals can retreat from thoughts and ideas at odds with their own".

Despite the criticisms, some academics have defended safe space practices. Chris Waugh, a PhD student at the University of Manchester, draws on the work of Jurgen Habermas and Nancy Fraser to argue that safe spaces have been consistently misrepresented in the media, describing most discourse around them as superficial. Waugh describes the conflict between the use of safe spaces as one between a perspective that focuses on adapting oneself to a single public sphere, with an emphasis on resilience as a virtue, vulnerability as something to be stamped out, and harm as something that is answered solely by toughening yourself as a form of self-reliance; and a perspective that focuses on creating multiple smaller interlocking social spheres, where such spaces serve as a forum for students to produce strategies and language intended to help them to actively resist harm in other parts of society.

Safe spaces in education are criticized for making students feel unable to express their ideas. Boostrom (1998) argued that we cannot foster critical dialogue regarding social justice "by turning the classroom into a 'safe space', a place in which teachers rule out conflict. ... We have to be brave because along the way we are going to be 'vulnerable and exposed'; we are going to encounter images that are 'alienating and shocking'. We are going to be very unsafe." Developing from Boostrom's ideas, in 2013 Brian Arao and Kristi Clemens introduced the term "brave space" to replace safe spaces for learning about diversity and social justice issues. According to them, brave spaces have several characteristics: "controversy with civility", "owning intentions and impacts", "challenge by choice", "respect", and "no attacks". National Association of Student Personnel Administrators (NASPA) has proposed the term "brave space" to be adopted to replace safe spaces in campuses. Michael Wilson, the principal of Magic City Acceptance Academy, a charter school in a suburb of Birmingham, Alabama, called his school a brave space.

== In popular culture ==
"Safespace" is also the name of a proposed hero from Marvel Comics, who assists the New Warriors in their most recent incarnation alongside his sibling, "Snowflake", who is non-binary. Snowflake possesses ice-based abilities similar to those of Iceman of the X-Men, while Safespace possesses the ability to generate reactive, defensive force fields that can only protect others. This superhero was criticized by some as a mocking reference to the term's slang use and the comic was never published. However, the comic remaining unpublished may have had more to do with the fact that the scheduled publication date, 15 April 2020, coincided with the onset of the COVID-19 lockdown in the US.

"Safe Space", the fifth episode of the nineteenth season of the animated TV series South Park, mocked the idea of safe spaces through the example of body-shaming. Viewers commented that the episode highlighted the hypocrisy of celebrities who post provocative photos online for attention or praise, but who are unreceptive to negative feedback.

In the 2023 middle-school children's book Jude Saves the World, the twelve-year-old non-binary protagonist is helped by two adults to set up a safe space at their local public library, where monthly meetings are well-attended both by LGBTQ+ individuals and their friends. The book sparked political backlash in Texas in 2025.

== See also ==
- Auto-segregation
- Holding space
- Identity safety cues
- Non-LGBTQ patronage of LGBTQ venues
- Microaggression
- No Safe Spaces
- Political lesbianism
- Separatist feminism
