= Holding space =

Concept meaning to create a safe space for someone

Holding space is a psychology concept meaning creating a safe space for someone or something by being present for them, physically, emotionally and mentally without judgement.

The concept of "holding" was coined by Donald Winnicott in 1960 in a paper on the relationship of infants and parents and has since seen evolving use in the field of psychotherapy. The term "holding space" was popularized around 2015 by Heather Plett in a blog post about the concept.

In popular culture, the phrase "holding space" gained a rapid rise in popularity following an interview in November 2024 between journalist Tracy E. Gilchrist and Wicked actresses Cynthia Erivo and Ariana Grande.

== History ==
Donald Winnicott coined the concept of "holding" in psychology in 1960 in a paper discussing the relationship of parents and infants. Since then, the concept has evolved in its use in therapy beyond the parent/child relationship, with the concept of empathy and meeting patients where they are at its core.

The "holding" concept further evolved with the term "holding space", which was popularized by Heather Plett, a writer from Canada in a then-viral 2015 blog post. Plett described the term as: "being willing to walk alongside another person in whatever journey they're on, without judging them, making them feel inadequate, trying to fix them, or trying to impact the outcome".

The term is often used in the context of therapy where the concept of safe spaces is a common theme.

=== In popular culture ===
The phrase "holding space" further gained rapid popularity outside of the field of psychology in November 2024 following an interview between Tracy E. Gilchrist and actresses Cynthia Erivo and Ariana Grande during a press tour interview for the 2024 musical fantasy film Wicked, based on the first act of the stage musical of the same name. In the interview, Gilchrist says to Erivo and Grande that audiences were "holding space" with the lyrics of "Defying Gravity", the musical's signature song. Axios has said the phrase means "a way of creating judgement-free, safe spaces for healing". Glamour said, "No one seems to fully understand what any of this actually means—or, for that matter, if it means anything at all. Indeed, that's kind of the beauty of it." In a follow-up interview with Variety, when asked to explain the meaning behind the phrase, Gilchrist explained her understanding of the phrase as:

'Holding space' is being physically, emotionally and mentally present with someone or something. For me, it means being in the moment, not being distracted and feeling something on a cellular level.

== See also ==
- Donald Winnicott § Concept of holding
- List of Internet phenomena
