= Wicked (2024 film) =

2024 film directed by Jon M. Chu

- Theatrical release poster
- Directed by: Jon M. Chu
- Screenplay by: Winnie Holzman (Note: Holzman is credited twice for writing the screenplay; first as a solo writer and as part of a writing team with Dana Fox.); Dana Fox
- Based on: Wicked by; Stephen Schwartz; Winnie Holzman; Wicked by Gregory Maguire
- Produced by: Marc Platt; David Stone
- Starring: Cynthia Erivo; Ariana Grande (Note: Per her own request, Grande is credited on-screen with her full name, Ariana Grande-Butera.); Jonathan Bailey; Ethan Slater; Bowen Yang; Peter Dinklage; Michelle Yeoh; Jeff Goldblum
- Cinematography: Alice Brooks
- Edited by: Myron Kerstein
- Music by: John Powell; Stephen Schwartz
- Production companies: Universal Pictures; Marc Platt Productions
- Distributed by: Universal Pictures
- Release dates: November 3, 2024 (State Theatre); November 22, 2024 (United States)
- Running time: 160 minutes
- Country: United States
- Language: English
- Budget: $150 million
- Box office: $764 million

Wicked (titled on-screen as Wicked: Part I) is a 2024 American musical fantasy film directed by Jon M. Chu and written by Winnie Holzman and Dana Fox. It adapts the first act of the 2003 stage musical by Stephen Schwartz and Holzman, which was loosely based on Gregory Maguire's 1995 novel, a re-imagining of L. Frank Baum's 1900 novel The Wonderful Wizard of Oz and its 1939 film adaptation. Cynthia Erivo and Ariana Grande star as Elphaba Thropp and Glinda Upland, respectively; while Jonathan Bailey, Ethan Slater, Bowen Yang, Peter Dinklage, Michelle Yeoh, and Jeff Goldblum appear in supporting roles. Set in the Land of Oz before the events of The Wonderful Wizard of Oz, the film explores the early relationship between Elphaba, the future Wicked Witch of the West, and her schoolmate Galinda, who becomes Glinda the Good.

Universal Pictures and Marc Platt, who both produced the stage musical, announced the film adaptation in 2012. After a long development and multiple delays, partly due to the COVID-19 pandemic, Chu was hired to direct, with Erivo and Grande cast in 2021. The adaptation was split into two parts to avoid omitting plot points and further develop the characters. Principal photography on both films began in England in December 2022, was interrupted in July 2023 by the 2023 SAG-AFTRA strike, and resumed and concluded in January 2024.

Wicked premiered at the State Theatre in Sydney on November 3, 2024, and was released in the United States on November 22. It was critically and commercially successful, grossing $764 million worldwide on a $150 million budget and becoming the highest-grossing Oz film, the highest-grossing musical film adaptation, and the fifth-highest-grossing film of 2024. The film was declared a pop culture phenomenon and was listed as one of the best musical films of the 21st century. Among its various accolades, Wicked earned ten nominations at the 97th Academy Awards (including Best Picture), winning Best Costume Design and Best Production Design. It also received three awards from the National Board of Review (including Best Film) and was listed among the top ten films of 2024 by the American Film Institute. The sequel, Wicked: For Good, was released on November 21, 2025.

== Plot ==
In the Land of Oz, Glinda the Good joins the citizens of Munchkinland as they celebrate the death of the Wicked Witch of the West. When asked why wickedness happens, Glinda explains that the Witch was the product of an affair between Governor Thropp's wife Melena and a mysterious traveling salesman. The salesman offered Melena a green elixir, causing the Witch to be born with green skin. Maligned from birth for her skin and impulsive use of magical powers, the Witch fostered a wish to meet the Wonderful Wizard of Oz, the ruler of Oz famed for his power to grant wishes. When the Munchkins ask if Glinda was friends with the Witch, she reflects on their relationship back at school.

Years earlier, green-skinned Elphaba Thropp escorts younger sister Nessarose on her first day at Shiz University. Nessarose's paraplegia causes the staff to patronise her, prompting an emotional outburst of Elphaba's powers. Shiz's Dean of Sorcery Studies, Madame Morrible, offers to enroll and privately tutor Elphaba in sorcery. She accepts, hoping she can fulfill her dream of working with the Wizard. Elphaba clashes constantly with her roommate, the popular Galinda Upland, who longs to become Morrible's student.

Elphaba's history professor is Dr. Dillamond, a talking goat who faces discrimination as one of Shiz's last Animal professors. She follows him to a meeting of Animals off-campus. Learning the Animals are somehow losing their ability to speak, Elphaba assures Dillamond the Wizard will set it right. Rebellious prince and transfer student Fiyero Tigelaar takes a group of students to a party at the Ozdust Ballroom nightclub. When Munchkin Boq Woodsman asks Galinda to accompany him, she convinces him to invite Nessarose so she can attend with Fiyero instead. Nessarose is overjoyed, and in thanks, Elphaba convinces Morrible to allow Galinda to study sorcery as well. When Elphaba is ridiculed at the Ozdust for wearing an ugly black hat gifted by Galinda as a practical joke, a remorseful Galinda dances with her, and the two begin to bond.

When Dillamond informs the class that Animals are no longer allowed to teach at Shiz, he is forcibly removed from the classroom and replaced by the unscrupulous Professor Nikidik, who demonstrates a cage containing a frightened lion cub, designed to prevent Animals from learning to speak. Elphaba angrily spins poppy dust over the room and escapes with Fiyero when the class falls unconscious. They release the cub into the forest, and Elphaba laments her unrequited feelings for Fiyero, who has chosen Galinda.

Elphaba receives an invitation from the Wizard, who has been made aware of her powers by Morrible. She arrives in the Emerald City with Galinda, now calling herself "Glinda" in solidarity with Dillamond, who constantly mispronounced her name. Their meeting with the Wizard, in which they're surprised to learn he's an ordinary man, is witnessed by Morrible. They induce Elphaba to cast a levitation spell from the sacred Grimmerie, a spellbook that only powerful sorcerers can read and comprehend, causing the Wizard's monkey guards to painfully sprout wings. As the Wizard and Morrible rejoice over their newfound ability to use the monkeys as spies, Elphaba realizes that they are the ones behind the Animals' oppression and that the fraudulent Wizard, unable to read the Grimmerie and lacking real magic of his own, used her to subjugate them further. A horrified Elphaba seizes the Grimmerie and flees.

Glinda follows Elphaba, who refuses to apologize to the Wizard, as Morrible denounces her to all of Oz. Elphaba tries to escape the Emerald City in the Wizard's hot air balloon, but the way up is barred, and the balloon burns up. High in a palace attic, Elphaba repeats the levitation spell on a broom. She urges Glinda to come with her, but Glinda chooses to remain behind. The two share an emotional farewell. Fiyero leaves Shiz on horseback amidst a mass evacuation, while Governor Thropp suffers a fatal heart attack when he and Nessarose receive the news. Elphaba flies west, leaving Glinda behind.

== Cast ==
- Cynthia Erivo as Elphaba Thropp, a misunderstood young woman born with green skin who becomes the Wicked Witch of the West
  - Karis Musongole as young Elphaba
- Ariana Grande as Galinda "Glinda" Upland, a charismatic young woman who becomes Glinda the Good (Note: Glinda's full identity is given as "Glinda the Good Witch of the North" in the film's script. It is not mentioned by that title in the film's dialogue and credits.)
- Jonathan Bailey as Fiyero Tigelaar, a handsome prince from Winkie Country who meets Elphaba and Galinda at school
- Ethan Slater as Boq Woodsman, a Munchkin in love with Galinda
- Bowen Yang as Pfannee, one of Galinda's college friends
- Marissa Bode as Nessarose Thropp, Elphaba's paraplegic younger half-sister
  - Cesily Collette Taylor as young Nessarose
- Peter Dinklage as the voice of Dr. Dillamond, a talking goat and history professor at Shiz University who befriends Elphaba
  - Luisa Guerreiro was the movement artist for Dr. Dillamond
- Michelle Yeoh as Madame Morrible, the Dean of Sorcery Studies at Shiz University
- Jeff Goldblum as the Wonderful Wizard of Oz
- Bronwyn James as ShenShen, one of Galinda's college friends
- Andy Nyman as Governor Thropp, Elphaba and Nessarose's father, and the Governor of Munchkinland
- Courtney-Mae Briggs as Mrs. Thropp, Elphaba and Nessarose's mother who died after giving birth to Nessarose
- Keala Settle as Miss Coddle, the headmistress of Shiz University
- Aaron Teoh as Avaric, Boq's friend
- Sharon D. Clarke as the voice of Dulcibear, a talking Bear who helps deliver Elphaba during her birth and serves as a nanny to the Thropp family
  - Madeleine Wilson was the movement artist for Dulcibear
- Jenna Boyd as the voice of the unnamed Wolf Doctor who helps deliver Elphaba during her birth
  - Sarah Mardel was the movement artist for Wolf Doctor
- Tom Kitely as the voice of a Snow Leopard, that attends a meeting with Dr. Dillamond
  - Omari Bernard was the movement artist for the Snow Leopard
- Elizabeth Dulau as the voice of the Piebald Deer, that attends a meeting with Dr. Dillamond
- Kim Durham as the voices of a Tamarin and Owl that attend a meeting with Dr. Dillamond
- Colin Michael Carmichael as Professor Nikidik, a new professor at Shiz University
- Robin Guiver plays Chistery, the leader of the Wizard's monkey army and one of the winged monkeys.
- Stephen Stanton voices Fiyero's Horse. (Note: Fiyero's Horse is named Feldspur in the film's script. It is not mentioned by that name in the film's credits.)

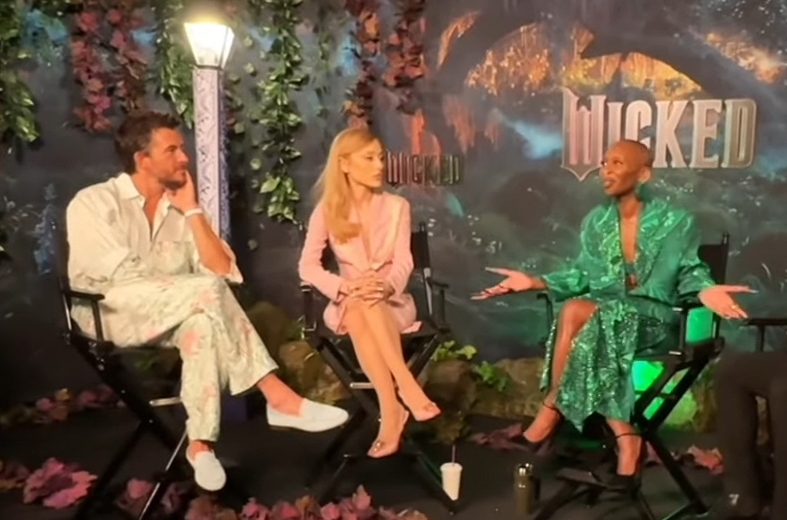
Jonathan Bailey, Ariana Grande, and Cynthia Erivo (L–R) play Fiyero, Glinda, and Elphaba

Multiple cameos take place during the "One Short Day" sequence. Idina Menzel and Kristin Chenoweth, who starred as Elphaba and Glinda in the original Broadway production of the stage musical, portray the leading members of the Emerald City Players. Michael McCorry Rose, who also played Fiyero in the Broadway production, appears as the Wiz-O-Mania narrator. Winnie Holzman, who wrote both the script for the stage musical and the film, appears as an audience member who exclaims, "He can read it [the Grimmerie]! He must be a Wizard!", while composer Stephen Schwartz appears as the Emerald City Guard, who announces to Elphaba and Galinda that "the Wizard will see you now". Adam James and Alice Fearn (who played Elphaba in the musical's West End production) appear briefly as Galinda's parents, nicknamed "Popsicle" and "Momsie" by Galinda.

== Production ==
=== Pre-production ===
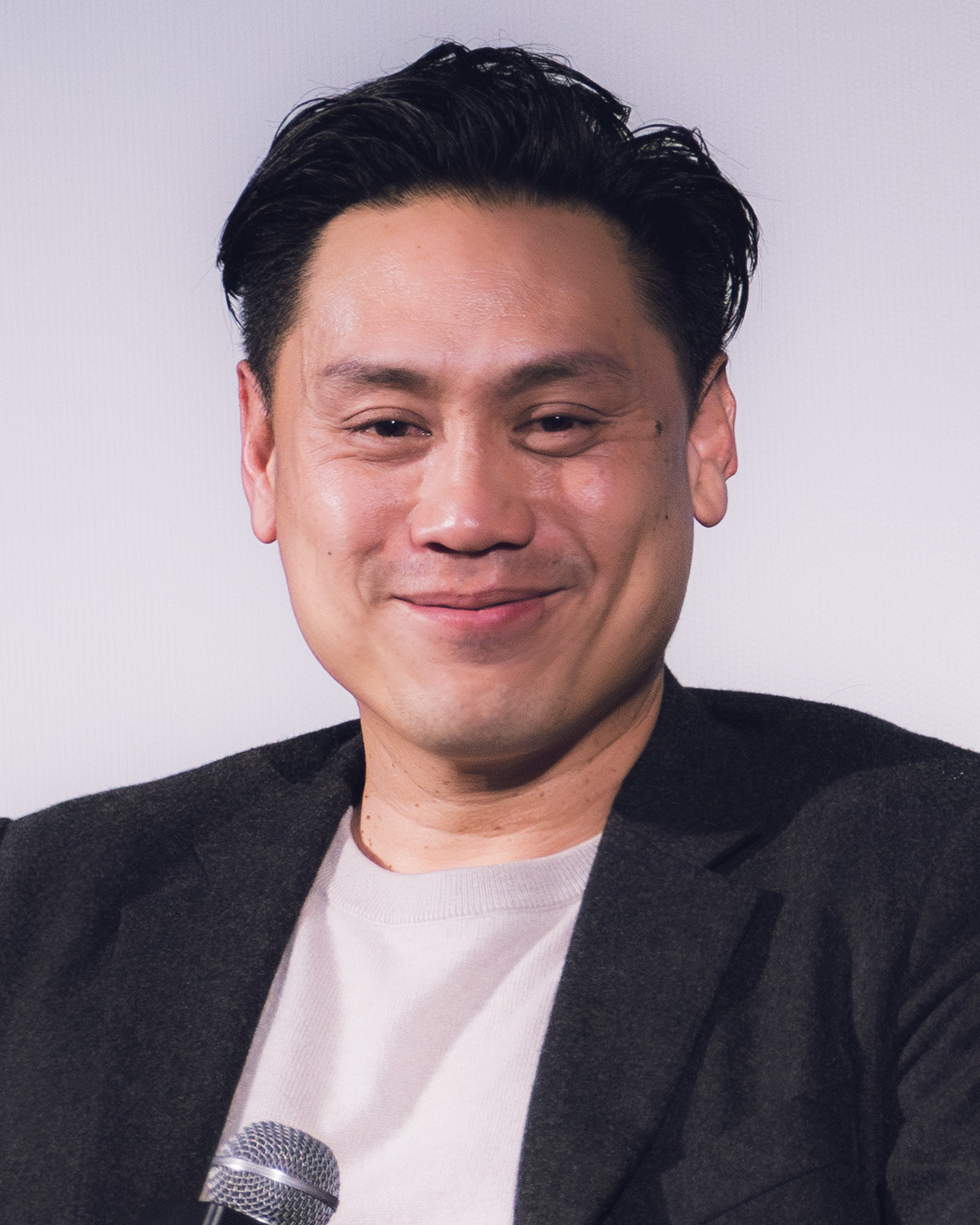
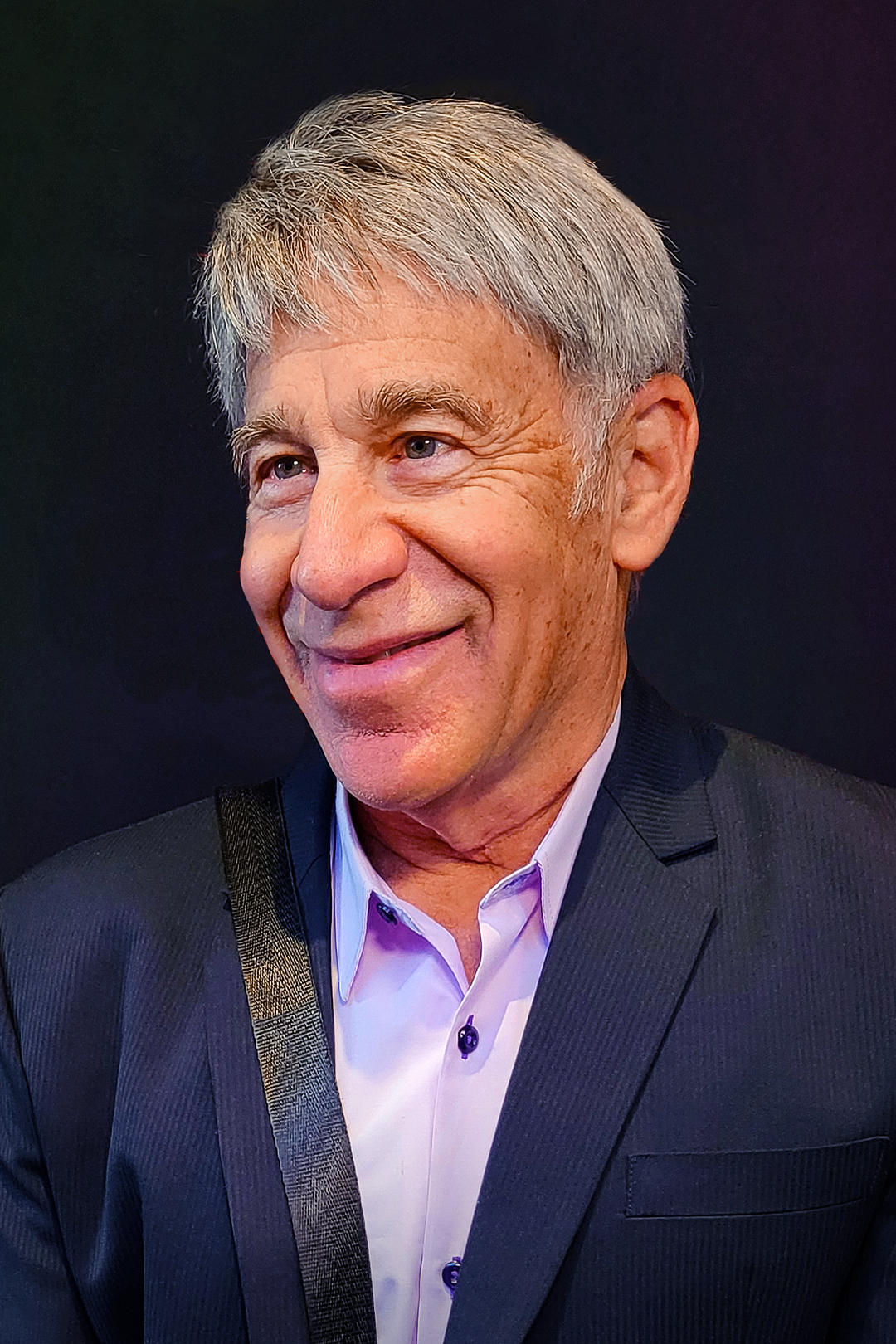
Director Jon M. Chu (left) and composer Stephen Schwartz (right)

In the 1990s, Universal Pictures received a pitch from actress Demi Moore, producer Suzanne Todd, and writer Linda Woolverton for a film adaptation of Gregory Maguire's Wicked: The Life and Times of the Wicked Witch of the West (1995) – a revisionist novel to L. Frank Baum's 1900 story The Wonderful Wizard of Oz. Other actresses who had expressed interest in adapting the novel included Whoopi Goldberg, Claire Danes, Salma Hayek, and Laurie Metcalf, and they had also been considered for the lead roles along with Michelle Pfeiffer, Emma Thompson, and Nicole Kidman. Woolverton had been hired to write the screenplay, and Robert Zemeckis was considered a potential director.

However, by 1998, composer Stephen Schwartz successfully persuaded Universal and then-head of production Marc Platt to adapt the novel as a stage musical, with Winnie Holzman joining as scriptwriter. The musical, titled Wicked, opened on Broadway at the Gershwin Theatre in 2003. The fourth-longest-running Broadway show in history, the musical has won three Tony Awards. The original Broadway production starred Idina Menzel as Elphaba and Kristin Chenoweth as Glinda.

In 2011, Universal began making plans for a film adaptation of the musical. Chenoweth, Menzel, Lea Michele, and Amy Adams were all rumored to be potential leads, Holzman and Schwartz were rumored as potential writers, and J. J. Abrams, Rob Marshall, James Mangold, and Ryan Murphy were all mentioned as possible candidates for director. In 2012, after the screen success of Les Misérables, Platt announced that the film was going ahead, later confirming it was aiming for a 2016 release. After a long development, Universal announced in 2016 that Wicked would be released in theatres on December 20, 2019, with Stephen Daldry directing. Daldry was reported considering Lady Gaga and Shawn Mendes for the roles of Elphaba and Fiyero. By 2024, Holzman was credited as the sole writer. In August 2024, it was determined by the Writers Guild of America that Dana Fox collaborated with Holzman on the screenplay, and that Craig Mazin contributed additional literary material. Like the stage musical, the script includes made-up words such as "braverism", "hideoteous", and "confusifying", giving the Land of Oz its own "Ozian" language.

In May 2017, Schwartz said Wicked would feature "at least two" new songs. On August 31, 2018, Universal put it on hold to accommodate its production schedule, and gave the film adaptation of Cats the release date formerly held by Wicked. On February 8, 2019, Universal announced a new release date of December 22, 2021. On April 1, 2020, Universal put Wicked on hold again due to the COVID-19 pandemic, and gave Sing 2 the 2021 release date. On October 20, 2020, it was announced that Daldry had left the production due to scheduling conflicts. On February 2, 2021, it was announced that Jon M. Chu would take over as director. In August 2021, Alice Brooks was confirmed as the cinematographer.

=== Casting ===
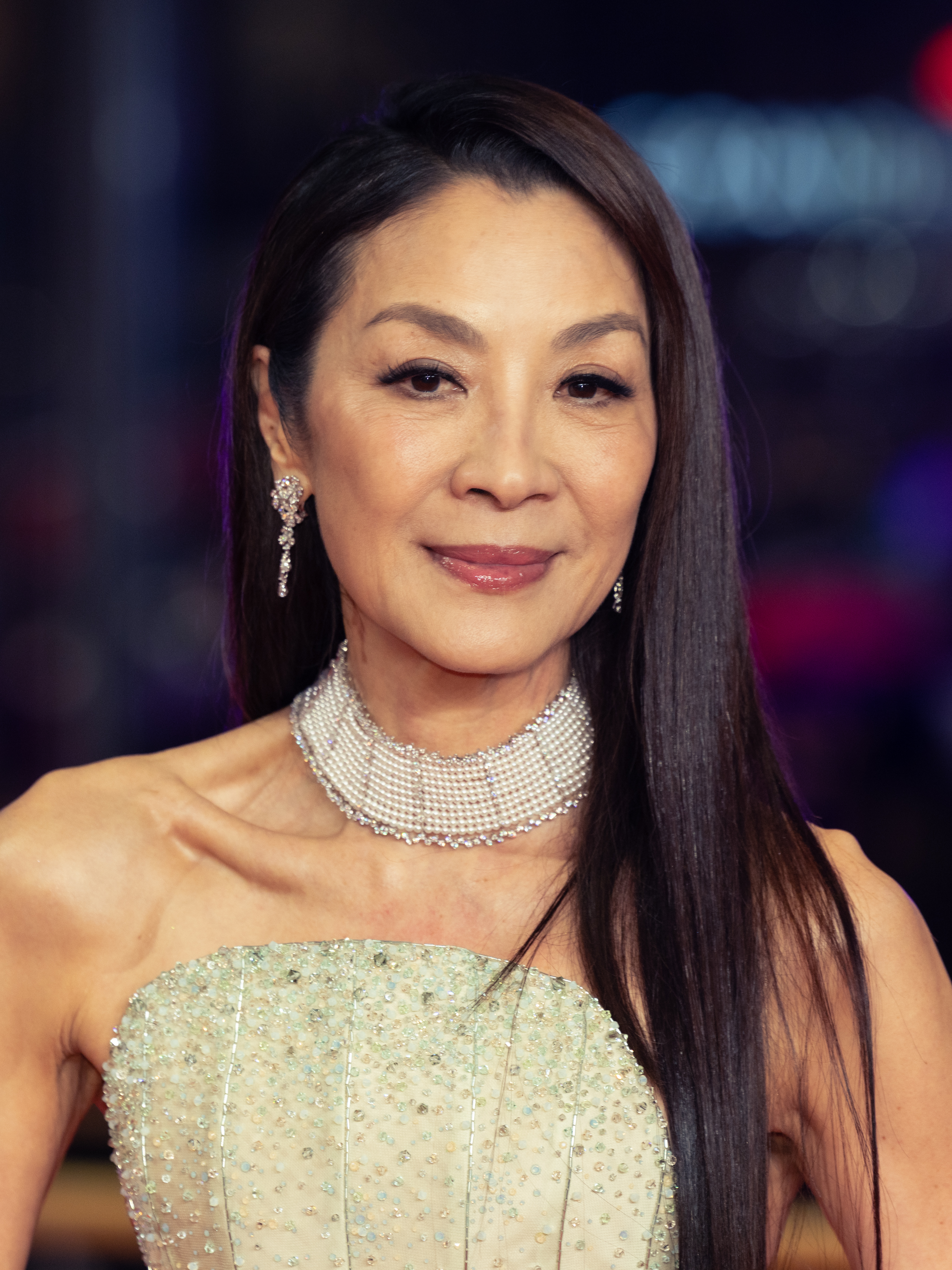
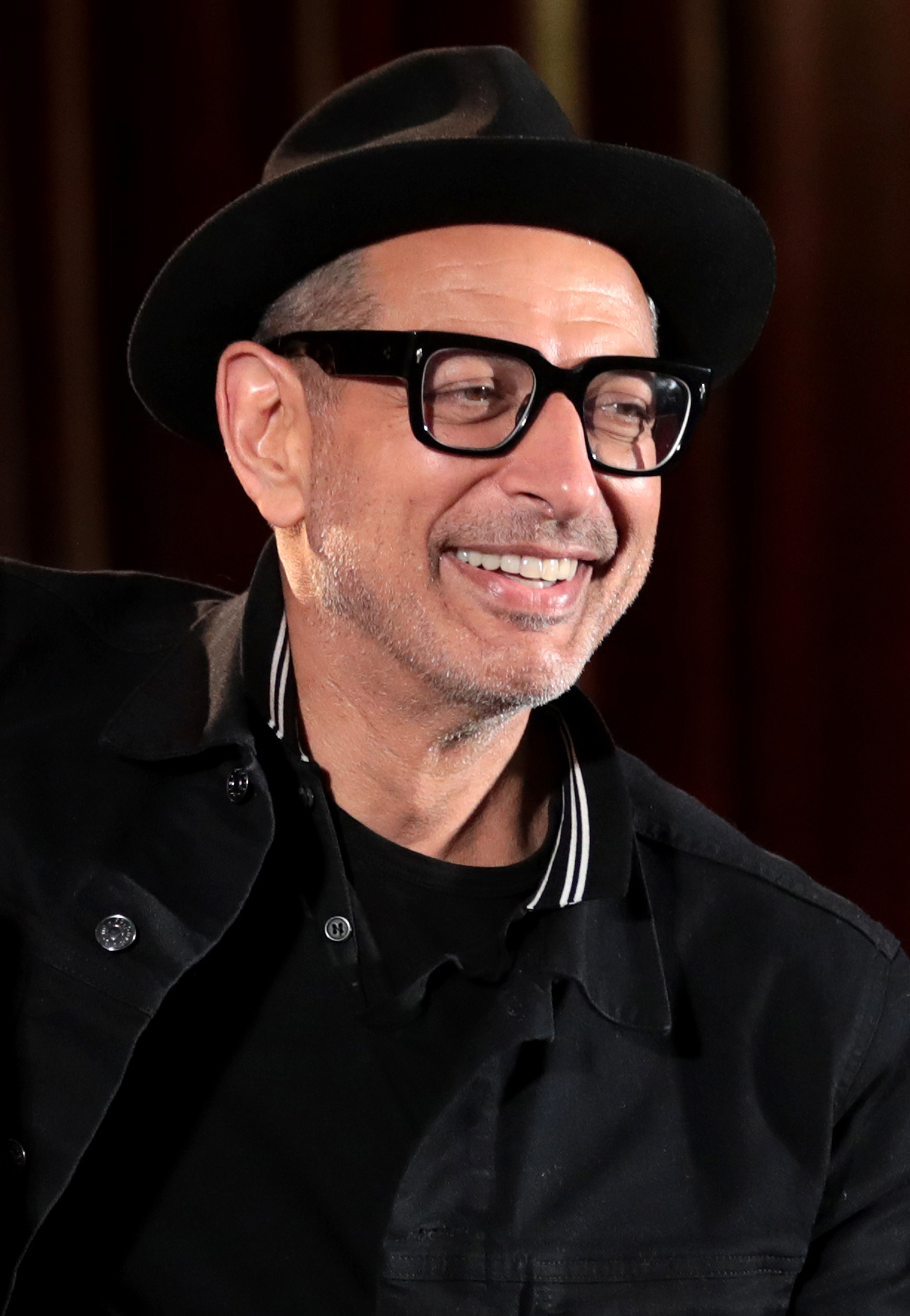
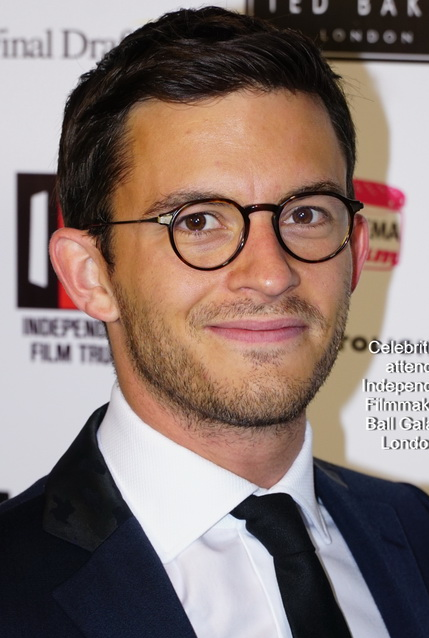
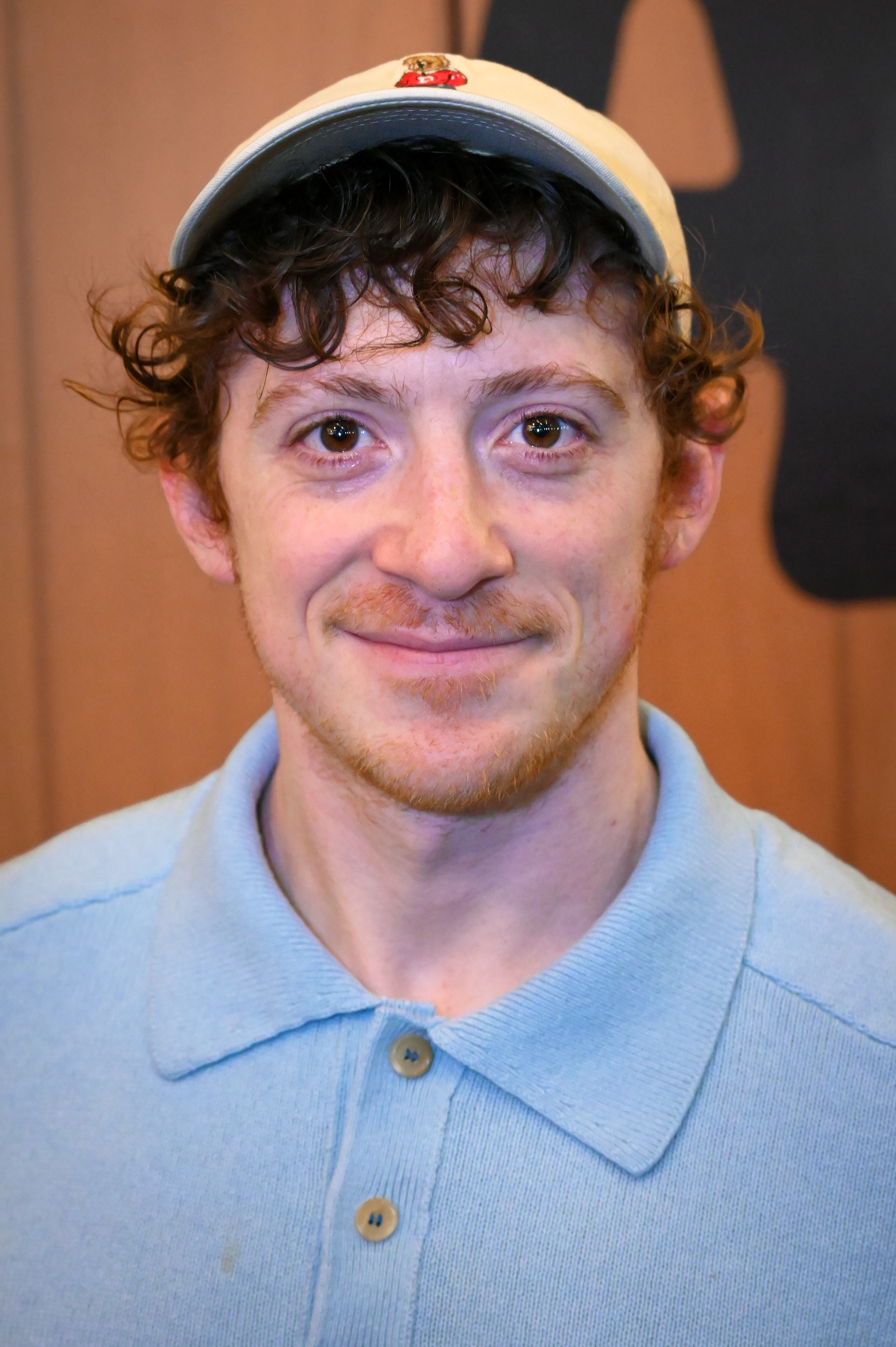
The supporting cast includes (Clockwise from top left) Michelle Yeoh, Jeff Goldblum, Ethan Slater, and Jonathan Bailey.

In November 2021, Cynthia Erivo and Ariana Grande were cast as Elphaba and Glinda. Grande initially auditioned for Elphaba due to a miscommunication causing Chu to believe that she expressed interest in that role over Glinda. Grande had previously recorded "Popular Song" (a remix of "Popular") in 2012, and performed "The Wizard and I" in the 2018 NBC special A Very Wicked Halloween. Erivo had previously performed "I Couldn't Be Happier" (an excerpt from "Thank Goodness") in the 2021 PBS special Wicked in Concert. Grande revealed that she auditioned three times for the role of Glinda. She stated that she began taking acting lessons a year before her first audition, also adding that "transforming [her] voice to sing Glinda's soprano parts took months". Dove Cameron, Reneé Rapp, and Amanda Seyfried were also reported to have auditioned for Glinda.

In June 2022, Chu confirmed the hiring of Nathan Crowley as production designer. On September 21, it was reported that Jonathan Bailey had joined the cast as Fiyero, beating, among others, Cooper Koch, Nick Jonas, and Joe Jonas for the role. In October 2022, it was announced that Jeff Goldblum was in final talks to star as the Wizard. Goldblum completed talks by December, when Ethan Slater, Michelle Yeoh, Marissa Bode, Bowen Yang, Bronwyn James, Keala Settle, Aaron Teoh, and Colin Michael Carmichael were also added to the cast. In April 2024, it was revealed that Peter Dinklage had been cast as the voice of Dr. Dillamond. Unlike the previous film adaptations of the Oz novels, dwarf actors were not cast as the Munchkins.

In April 2022, Erivo expressed her desire to watch the stage version on Broadway again before filming and stated that she has been "relearning everything". She also said at that time that talks were in progress about the visual style, and confirmed the hiring of Paul Tazewell as costume designer. Erivo mentioned that she envisioned Elphaba's costume to incorporate "a Jean Paul Gaultier collection with a 'new world, kind of gilded age' feeling". Erivo also contributed to Elphaba's hair and nails: "I knew I wanted [Elphaba] to have micro braids and I wanted her to have a full set [of nails] for two reasons: [they are] a nod to my culture and a nod to the world of Oz." She also stated: "I imagined that her nails were a part of her magic – that they just grew out of her and she hadn't yet discovered why, like her green skin."

=== Writing ===
On April 26, 2022, Chu announced that the adaptation would be filmed in two parts (the other being Wicked: For Good), saying that it was difficult to incorporate the entire story into one movie without "doing some real damage to it" and compromising the story. Thus, he said, it was decided to split the story into two films; doing so would allow for more "depth and surprise to the journeys for these beloved characters."

Schwartz echoed Chu's sentiment in June, while also confirming that a new song was in the works. He said that it was tough to get past the song "Defying Gravity" with no break since it was "written specifically to bring a curtain down". He added, "[I]f we all continue to have the same degree of input, I could have a conversation with anyone who has a question about any of the changes made from the stage show and justify why I think it's better for the movie."

==== Differences from the musical ====
New characters in Wicked include Miss Coddle; Dulcibear, Elphaba's childhood nanny; and Galinda's parents, who drop her off at Shiz University. Miss Coddle is the university's headmistress, previously Madame Morrible's role in the stage musical, with Morrible now the Dean of Sorcery. New scenes include Elphaba's tutoring sessions with Madame Morrible as she learns to control her powers, flashbacks to her childhood as she's ridiculed for her green skin, and moments showing her and Nessarose's dynamic as sisters. In the musical, Dr. Dillamond was the only Animal professor at Shiz; this is changed in the movie. The sexual content of the novel and the musical was toned down so both films could reach a wider audience and attain a PG rating from the Motion Picture Association (MPA). Pfannee, who was female in the novel and is cast as such in the musical, is portrayed as male in Wicked. In the musical, Elphaba is already enrolled at Shiz University alongside Nessarose; in the film, she is there to accompany and look after Nessarose at their father's request, before Morrible enrolls her later on. Elphaba and Fiyero's first meeting in Wicked happens in the forest, rather than with a group of classmates at Shiz University.

The "Something Bad" sequence is changed from a conversation between Dr. Dillamond and Elphaba to a private meeting of the talking Animals at Dillamond's off-campus residence, where they sing to each other about the state of Oz. "Dancing Through Life" takes place inside the university's circular, rotating library and includes an extended dance break. The Ozdust Ballroom is also reimagined as what Chu called a nightclub in "the underbelly of Oz", complete with a musical band of Animals. The "Popular" performance is extended and features additional key changes. "One Short Day" is also significantly extended to include the Emerald City Players, who delve into the origins of the Grimmerie. "Defying Gravity" is extended to work as the cliffhanger, featuring an extra vocal section. Elphaba's battle cry, which normally ends the song, is followed by a score extension inspired by Richard Strauss's Also sprach Zarathustra (made famous by the 1968 film 2001: A Space Odyssey).

=== Filming ===
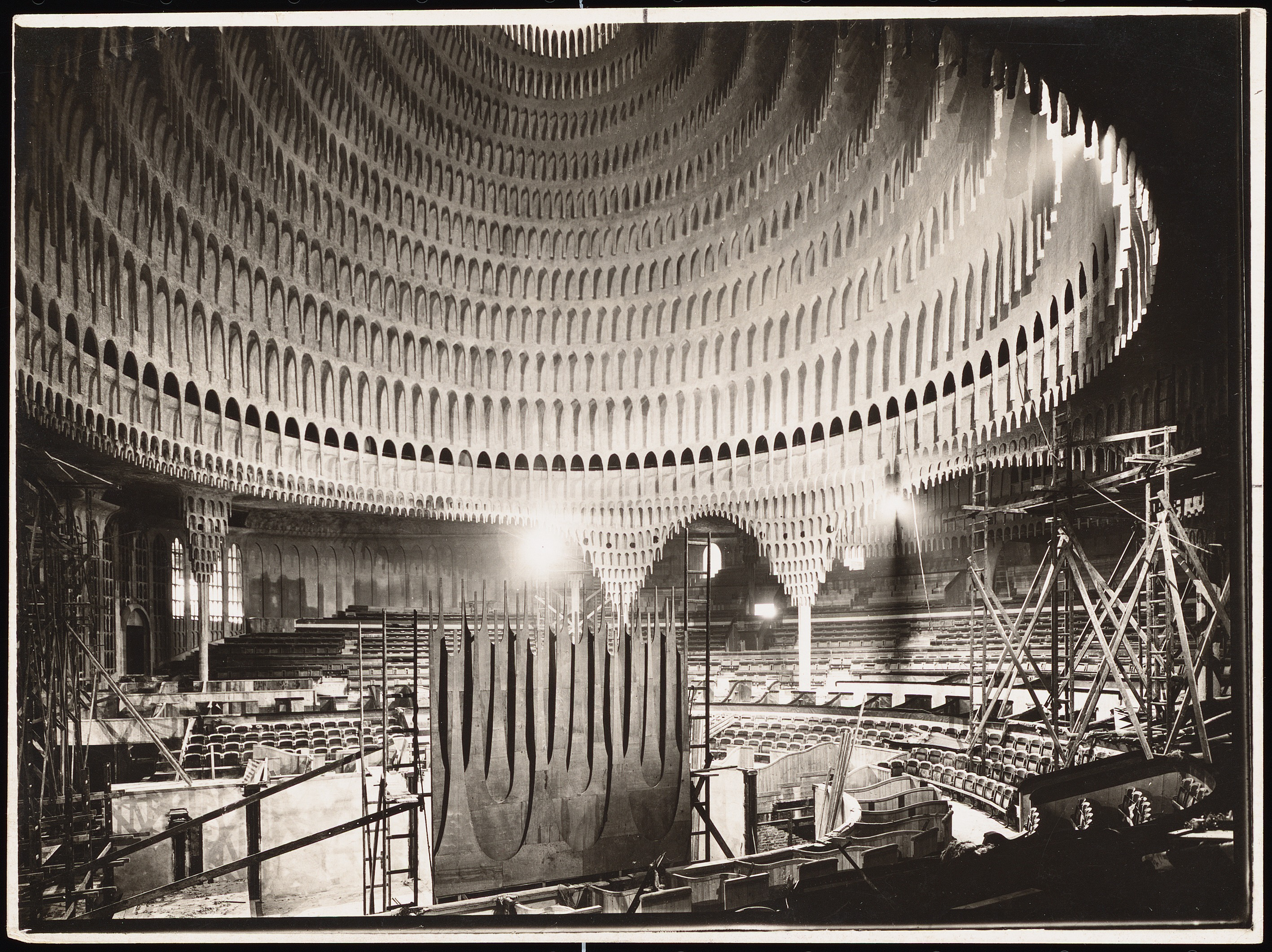
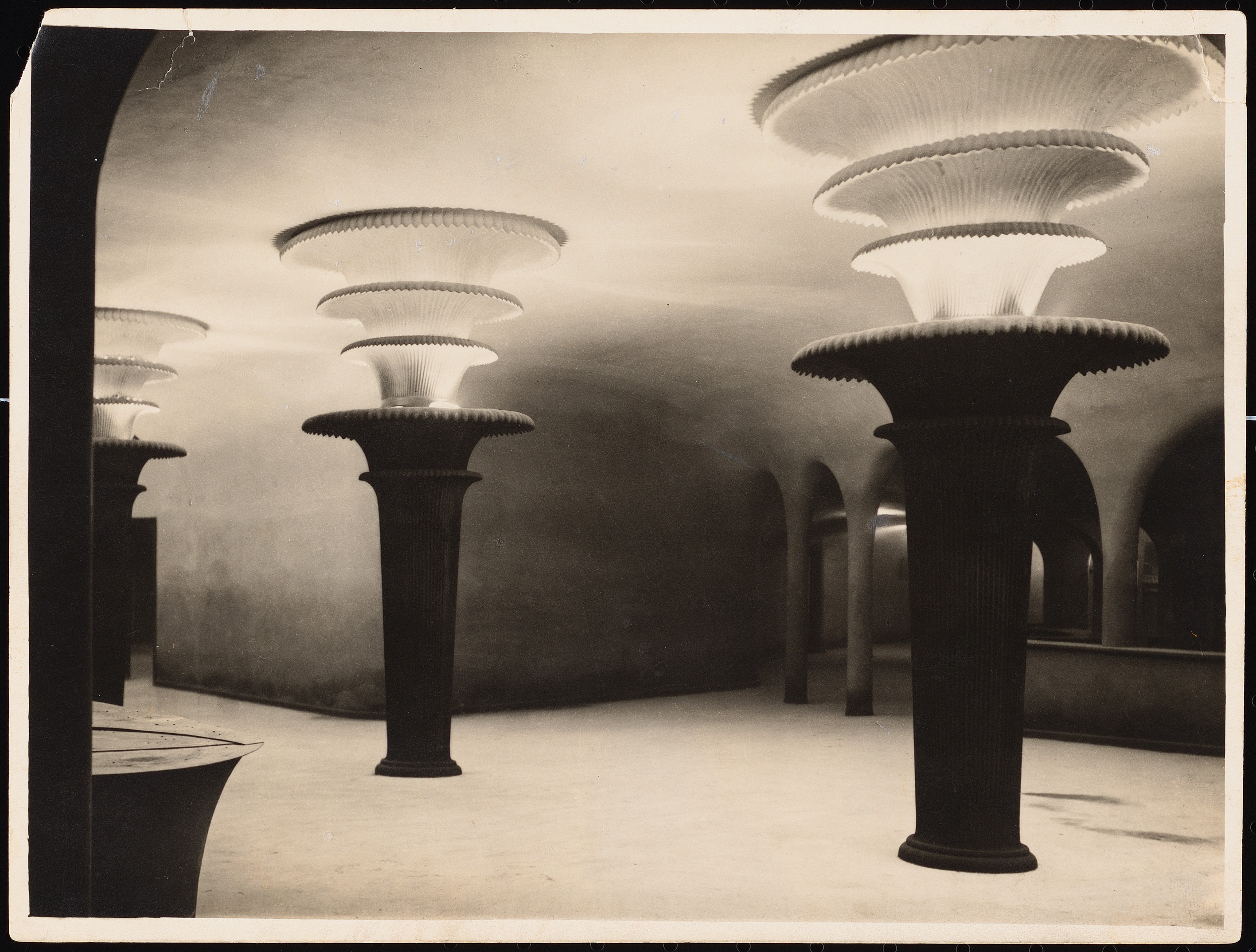
The interior of the Wizard's castle was inspired by Hans Poelzig's Großes Schauspielhaus.

Principal photography was set to commence in June 2022 at Sky Studios Elstree in the United Kingdom. In July 2021, Schwartz indicated there were plans to film in Atlanta that year. In July 2022, it was revealed that rehearsals for Wicked would start in August, with principal photography beginning in November. Grande later revealed her crown fittings for costuming took place in September. On December 9, Chu confirmed on Twitter that filming had begun. Early into filming, paparazzi were seen flying over the Munchkinland set in Ivinghoe, England, by hang glider with GoPro cameras attached to their feet, in order to leak photos and videos from the set. Grande told VMan: "I think we were very spoiled to have done this with [Chu]. It felt like a teeny, little secret student thing – it's intimacy... It felt so small and private until all of a sudden, we were outside, and the Daily Mail was hand gliding [sic] over our set". Filming was scheduled to wrap in late July 2023. Shooting was suspended on July 13 due to the 2023 SAG-AFTRA strike. Filming resumed and concluded in January 2024, lasting for 155 days. Christopher Scott choreographed the musical numbers.

The song vocals were recorded live on set at the insistence of Erivo and Grande. Chu cited Steven Spielberg's 1991 film Hook as inspiration for the large-scale sets and practical effects, including nine million colorful tulips planted on location to surround the Munchkinland set, a paved yellow brick road with real mud, and a life-size art deco-inspired train to transport Elphaba and Glinda to the Emerald City. Chu also cited the 1998 films Pleasantville and The Truman Show as influences on how both Wicked and Wicked: For Good thematically portray the Land of Oz, saying, "It helps create this idea of the rebelliousness that this new younger generation are discovering... How far will that take everybody in Oz throughout the course of the whole story of both movies? It's an awakening of a generation. You start to see the truth about things that maybe you were taught differently." The interior of the Wizard's castle was inspired by Hans Poelzig's Großes Schauspielhaus.

=== Post-production and visual effects ===
Industrial Light & Magic and Framestore provided the visual effects for Wicked, with Pablo Helman serving as the production visual effects supervisor. On February 6, 2024, it was confirmed that post-production work was in progress, with Chu working remotely with editor Myron Kerstein via with the newly released Apple Vision Pro. Throughout editing, Kerstein felt emotionally connected to Wicked and its story, particularly during post-production work on the Ozdust Ballroom and "Defying Gravity" sequences. Reflecting on the former scene, he stated: "We always felt like the Ozdust Ballroom was basically the set piece we had to get right, because if that didn't work, the rest of the movie was going to fall apart." The sequence involved watching the entireties of every ten-minute-long take of Elphaba and Glinda's dance duet and picking the right portions that provoked the most emotional response. Editing on the entire film was done through Avid Media Composer.

Wicked has 2,200 visual effects shots. Team Aspect handled the main-on-end title sequence and motion design, using 1930s stylization in homage to Metro-Goldwyn-Mayer's film The Wizard of Oz (1939); this included a recreation of the Universal logo at the start, along with onscreen typography for the title and "To be continued" cards similar to the font used in The Wizard of Oz.

==== Dubbing ====
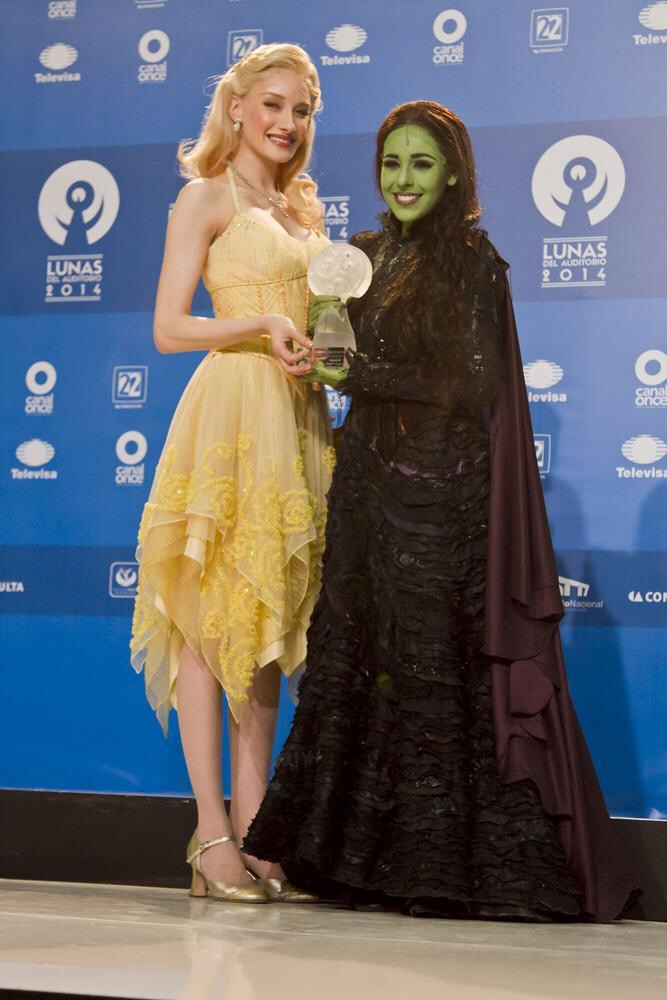
Ceci de la Cueva and Danna Paola as Glinda and Elphaba in 2014.

Wicked was dubbed in several countries where local productions of the original musical were staged. Many of the dubs have actresses reprising their roles as Elphaba and Glinda after previously portraying them on stage, including Danna Paola and Ceci de la Cueva in Latin American Spanish, Myra Ruiz and Fabi Bang in Brazilian Portuguese, and Park Hye-na and Jeong Sunah in Korean. In the German dub, Elphaba was voiced by Sabrina Weckerlin, who was an alternate for the character in the original 2007 production. Johanne Milland, the voice of Glinda in Danish, portrayed the character in the 2024 production. Dutch actress Vajèn van den Bosch, who portrayed Elphaba in the German production in 2021, instead returned as Glinda in the Dutch dub.

Additionally, certain local performers were brought in to dub Menzel and Chenoweth's cameos. Willemijn Verkaik, who first played Elphaba in the original 2007 German production and again in several international engagements (including the original 2011 Dutch production, as well as the West End and Broadway in 2013), dubbed over Menzel in the Dutch and German versions, together with Chenoweth's dubbers and original Glinda actresses Chantal Janzen and Lucy Scherer. Maria Lucia Rosenberg, who portrayed Elphaba in the original 2011 Danish production, returned to dub Menzel in Danish. Other dubs, particularly in countries where the musical had not premiered, saw Menzel dubbed over by actresses who had voiced another character she originated: Elsa from Disney's Frozen. Such instances included Elke Buyle in Flemish, Nikolett Füredi in Hungarian, Taryn Szpilman in Brazilian Portuguese, and Annika Herlitz in Swedish.

In Norway, Wicked was released without the musical ever being staged there. Two days before the release, a first-time Norwegian production of the musical was announced, and premiered on March 6, 2025. Sanne Kvitnes reprised her role as Elphaba, while Alexandra Rotan took over the role of Glinda from Trine Bariås.

=== Music ===
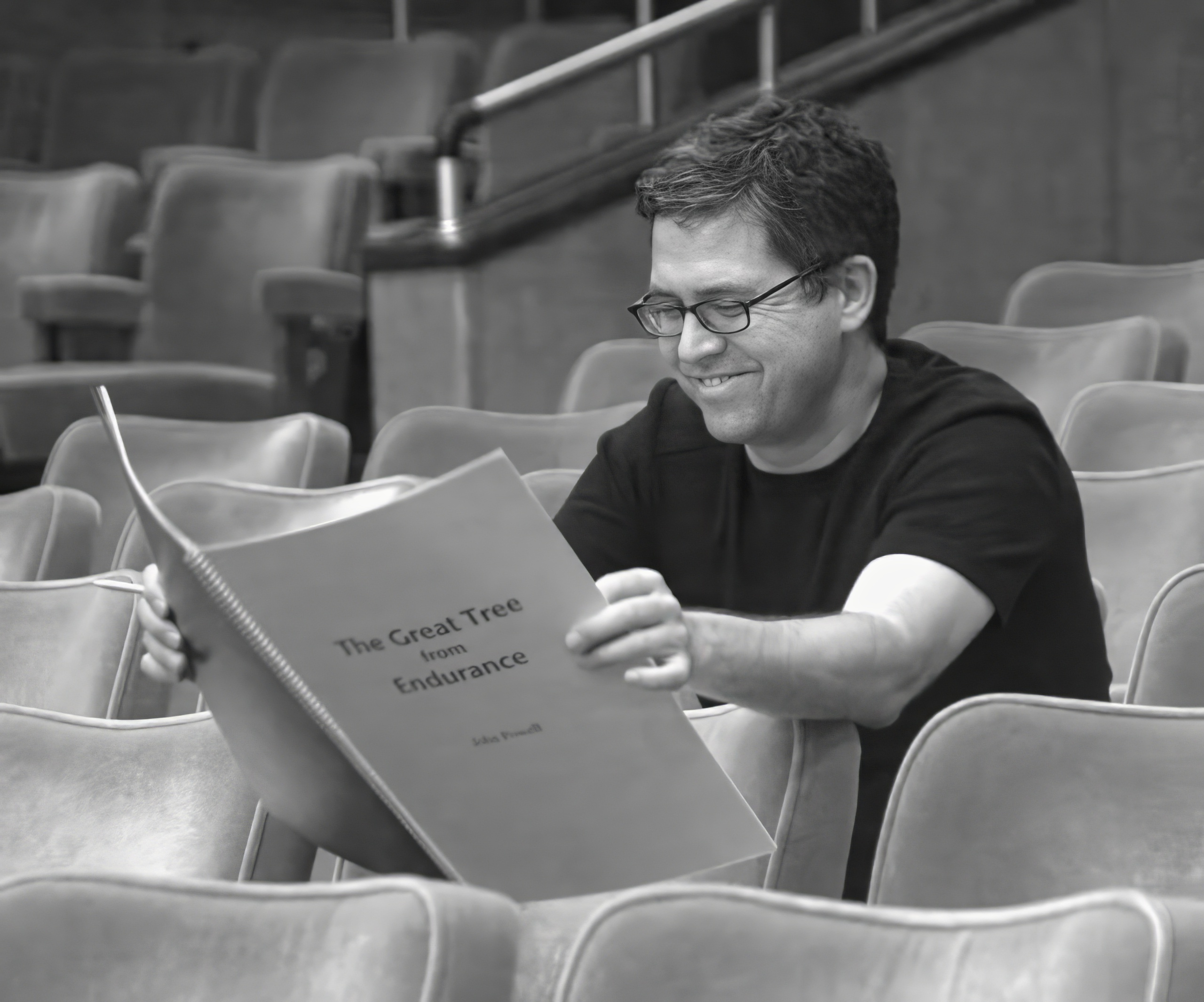
John Powell (pictured in 2008), composed the score with Stephen Schwartz.

The soundtrack album for Wicked was released on November 22, 2024, through Republic and Verve Records. The score album was released on December 6, 2024. Schwartz composed the score alongside John Powell. Jeff Atmajian updated William David Brohn's original orchestrations for the songs and enlarged the orchestra from the stage version's original 23 musicians to 80. The recording sessions took place at AIR Studios in London, with the musical's original music director Stephen Oremus conducting the song cues and Powell conducting the score cues alongside Gavin Greenaway, all with the London Symphony Orchestra. Schwartz, Oremus, and Greg Wells were the soundtrack's producers. A sing-along edition of the soundtrack was released on December 20, 2024. It features the original album's 11 tracks without lead vocals, but keeps the ensemble's vocals and some of the dialogue parts intact. On April 4, 2025, a new version of the soundtrack was released featuring spoken commentary on all songs by Wicked's cast and crew. Some songs from Wicked: For Good appear in the film, most prominently "For Good" in scenes showcasing Elphaba and Glinda's friendship.

==== Main musical numbers ====
- "No One Mourns the Wicked" – Glinda and Citizens of Oz
- "Dear Old Shiz" – Students and Glinda
- "The Wizard and I" – Madame Morrible and Elphaba
- "What Is This Feeling?" – Glinda, Elphaba and Students
- "Something Bad" – Doctor Dillamond and Elphaba
- "Dancing Through Life" – Fiyero, Glinda, Boq, Nessarose, Elphaba and Students
- "Popular" – Glinda
- "I'm Not That Girl" – Elphaba
- "One Short Day" – Elphaba, Glinda and Ozians
- "A Sentimental Man" – The Wizard
- "Defying Gravity" – Elphaba, Glinda, Madame Morrible and Ozians

== Marketing ==
On April 16, 2023, first-look pictures of Elphaba and Glinda were released through social media. Work-in-process footage, featuring first listens to Erivo and Grande's renditions of "Defying Gravity" and "Popular", was presented at CinemaCon on April 26, 2023. A 60-second teaser trailer premiered during Super Bowl LVIII on February 11, 2024. On April 10, 2024, new footage was presented at CinemaCon, where Wicked's cast gathered to promote the film. Costumes and props were on display in the venue's lobby during the event. The three-minute theatrical trailer was released on May 15, 2024, followed by a Lego version made in the brickfilm style on May 29. NBC promoted Wicked extensively during its coverage of the 2024 Summer Olympics in Paris, featuring multiple TV and streaming advertisements. Erivo and Grande attended the opening ceremony and the qualifying round of the women's gymnastics event. On September 4, 2024, character posters were revealed ahead of the release of a new trailer the next day, which remixed "Defying Gravity" with the "Wicked Witch" theme from The Wizard of Oz (1939). A behind-the-scenes television special, Defying Gravity: The Curtain Rises on Wicked, aired on NBC on November 19, 2024. After debuting in the TV special, the "What Is This Feeling?" performance was uploaded to YouTube on November 22, 2024, coinciding with the film's release.

Wicked was promoted with the "Journey Through Oz" Press Tour during the weeks leading up to its release, with each city being transformed into some of the film's locations: Sydney (Munchkinland), Los Angeles (Shiz University), Mexico City (Enchanted Forest), New York (Ozdust Ballroom), and London (Emerald City). Universal released a wide range of Wicked merchandise, including toys, apparel, books, beauty products, and accessories. The company had 450 promotional partners, with a media value of $350 million, the most ever for a Hollywood theatrical film. Universal launched an interactive website for Shiz University, including a welcome brochure for new students and a guided tour of the campus. Grande's cosmetics brand R.E.M. Beauty released a collaboration inspired by Wicked to coincide with its release. A 96-page Wicked-focused special-edition issue of People magazine was released in November 2024, featuring exclusive cast interviews and pictures from production. Wicked was featured at the 2025 Rose Parade on New Year's Day in Pasadena, California, with a 55-foot-long "Defying Gravity" float decorated with 60,000 tulips. Promoting the streaming release on Peacock, Universal sold its most Pay 1 movie ad spots ever with sixteen brand partners.

=== Poster controversy ===
The film's promotional poster (left) recreated the stage musical's original poster art (right), which led to many re-edits and parodies. One poster in particular was criticized by Erivo.

On October 9, 2024, to coincide with tickets going on sale, a poster was released with Erivo and Grande in-character recreating the original poster art of the stage musical. Reception towards the poster was mixed, resulting in the creation of fan edits and internet memes designed to bring the poster closer to the original art, using Adobe Photoshop and generative AI tools. A Twitter user created their own edit, attempting to more accurately match the poster to the original artwork by obscuring Elphaba's eyes, raising Glinda's hand to cover her mouth, and giving Elphaba smirking red lips. Many fans considered it an improvement. On October 16, Erivo reposted the re-edit on Instagram and stated:

This is the wildest, most offensive thing I have seen, equal to that awful AI [sic] of us fighting, equal to people posing the question "is your [p__] green" [a reference to a 2014 meme] ... None of this is funny. None of it is cute. It degrades me. It degrades us. The original poster is an ILLUSTRATION. I am a real life human being, who chose to to [sic] look right down the barrel of the camera to you, the viewer ...because without words we communicate with our eyes. Our poster is an homage not an imitation, to edit my face and hide my eyes is to erase me. And that is just deeply hurtful.

The user later deleted the post out of respect for Erivo, adding that their intentions were not malicious and they had not anticipated the reaction. However, on October 20, the user reposted their edit, saying while they felt Erivo's feelings were valid, they stood by the image as "an innocent fan edit to pay homage to the original Broadway poster". On October 19, Grande responded to the controversy, saying, "I think it's very complicated because I find AI so conflicting and troublesome sometimes, but I think it's just kind of such a massive adjustment period... This is something that is so much bigger than us, and the fans are gonna have fun and make their edits... I have so much respect for my sister, Cynthia, and I love her so much." On October 29, Erivo was asked by Entertainment Tonight about the nature of her comments, and said that "it wasn't necessarily a clapback... Because I think I'm really protective of the role... I am passionate about it, and I know that the fans are passionate about it, and I think, for me, it was just like a human moment of wanting to protect little Elphaba. It was a human moment. I probably should've called my friends, but it's fine."

=== Mattel dolls ===
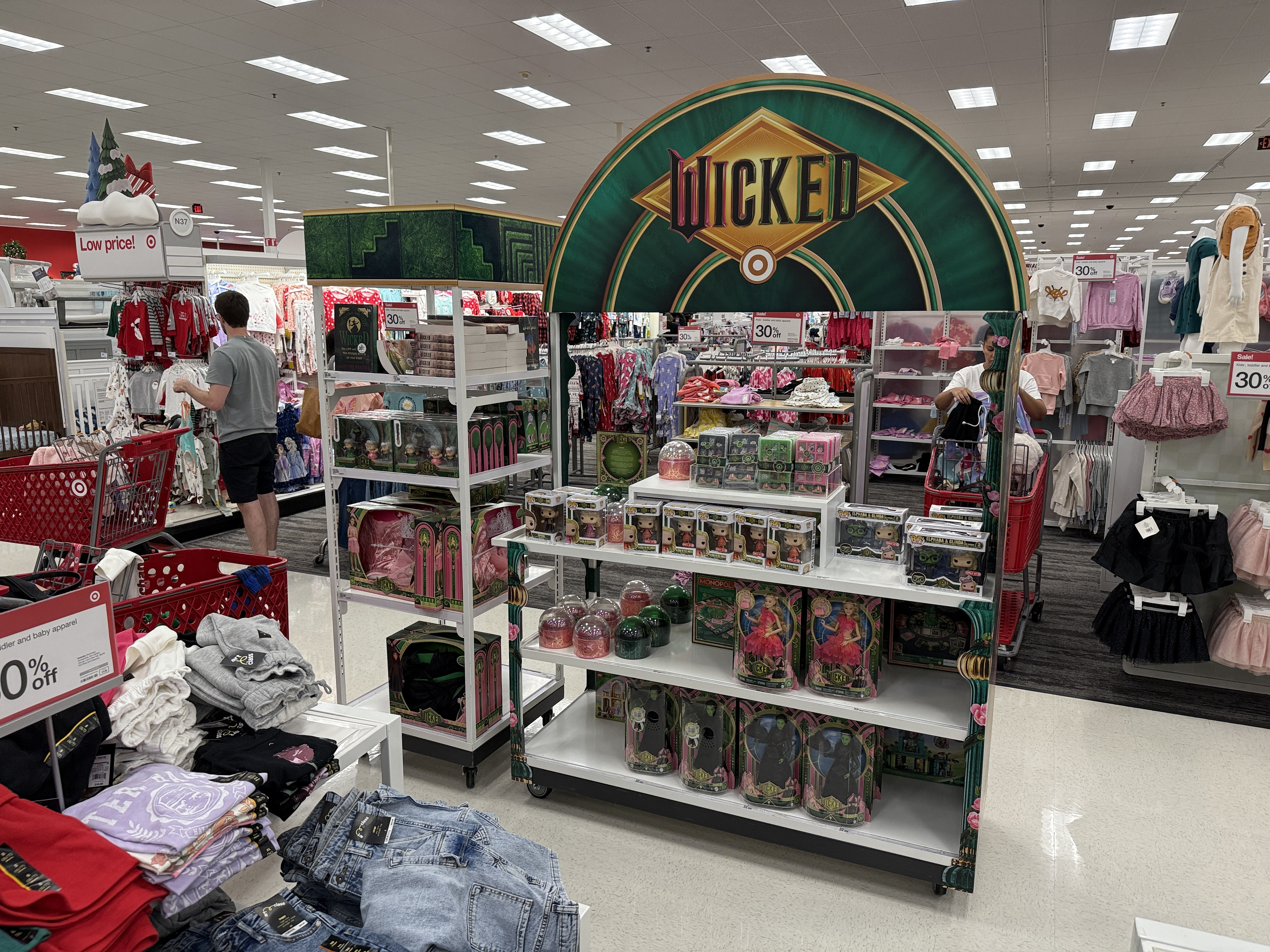
Merchandise for the Wicked film displayed for sale at a Target store in Orlando, Florida, November 2024.

Mattel produced a series of dolls portraying Glinda, Elphaba, Fiyero, Madame Morrible, as well as Nessarose in a wheelchair. In August 2024, two song snippets, ("Popular" and "Defying Gravity"), were leaked through a sound chip in Mattel's line of singing dolls.

In November 2024, the boxes and instruction sheets for many dolls were found to contain links to the website of the adult film studio Wicked Pictures (wicked.com) instead of Wicked's official website (wickedmovie.com). Mattel apologized for the error, and asked parents who had bought products with the incorrect website to destroy the packaging. In December 2024, Mattel was sued by a mother in South Carolina, citing the emotional distress that she and her daughter had suffered due to the error. Consequently, Mattel issued a statement to some media outlets, indicating that the dolls had returned for sale with correct packaging and that "the previous misprint on the packaging in no way impacts the value or play experience provided by the product itself in the limited number of units sold before the correction."

== Release ==
Wicked was screened exclusively for influencers, awards season pundits and entertainment industry personnel on the Universal Studios Lot on October 16, 2024. A private screening was held at the home of Kim Kardashian on October 22, 2024, exclusively attended by her family alongside Erivo and Grande. Another private screening was at the DGA Theater in Manhattan, New York on October 28, 2024, attended by Erivo, Grande, Chu, Platt, Schwartz, original Broadway cast members Kristin Chenoweth, Norbert Leo Butz, and Christopher Fitzgerald, members of the Broadway cast and other actresses who had played Elphaba and Glinda on Broadway and national tour over the years. The screening was preceded by a video greeting from Idina Menzel, who could not attend due to rehearsals being underway for the new musical Redwood. A screening hosted by Anna Wintour was held at the Metropolitan Museum of Art on November 14, 2024, attended by the cast members and other celebrities. Screenings for the general public took place at the State Theatre in Sydney from November 20 through November 22.

Wicked premiered in Sydney at the State Theatre on November 3, 2024, with subsequent premieres in Los Angeles at the Dorothy Chandler Pavilion on November 9, Mexico City at the Auditorio Nacional on November 11, Manhattan, New York at the Museum of Modern Art on November 14, and London at the Royal Festival Hall on November 18. It was theatrically released by Universal Pictures in Australia and Mexico on November 21, and in the U.S. on November 22, with engagements in RealD 3D, IMAX, Dolby Cinema, 4DX, ScreenX and D-Box. That was followed by its premiere in Poland as the closing night film of the 32nd International Film Festival of the Art of Cinematography Camerimage on November 23, with cinematographer Alice Brooks and production designer Nathan Crowley (who received the 2024 Production Designer Award at the festival) in attendance. Advance screenings took place on November 18, 2024, for Amazon Prime members, and on November 20 for the general public. The two screenings marked the only times during the theatrical release that most theaters across the United States were simultaneously able to show it in IMAX, due to Gladiator II taking over most of those screens on opening weekend. A sing-along version was released theatrically on Christmas Day 2024.

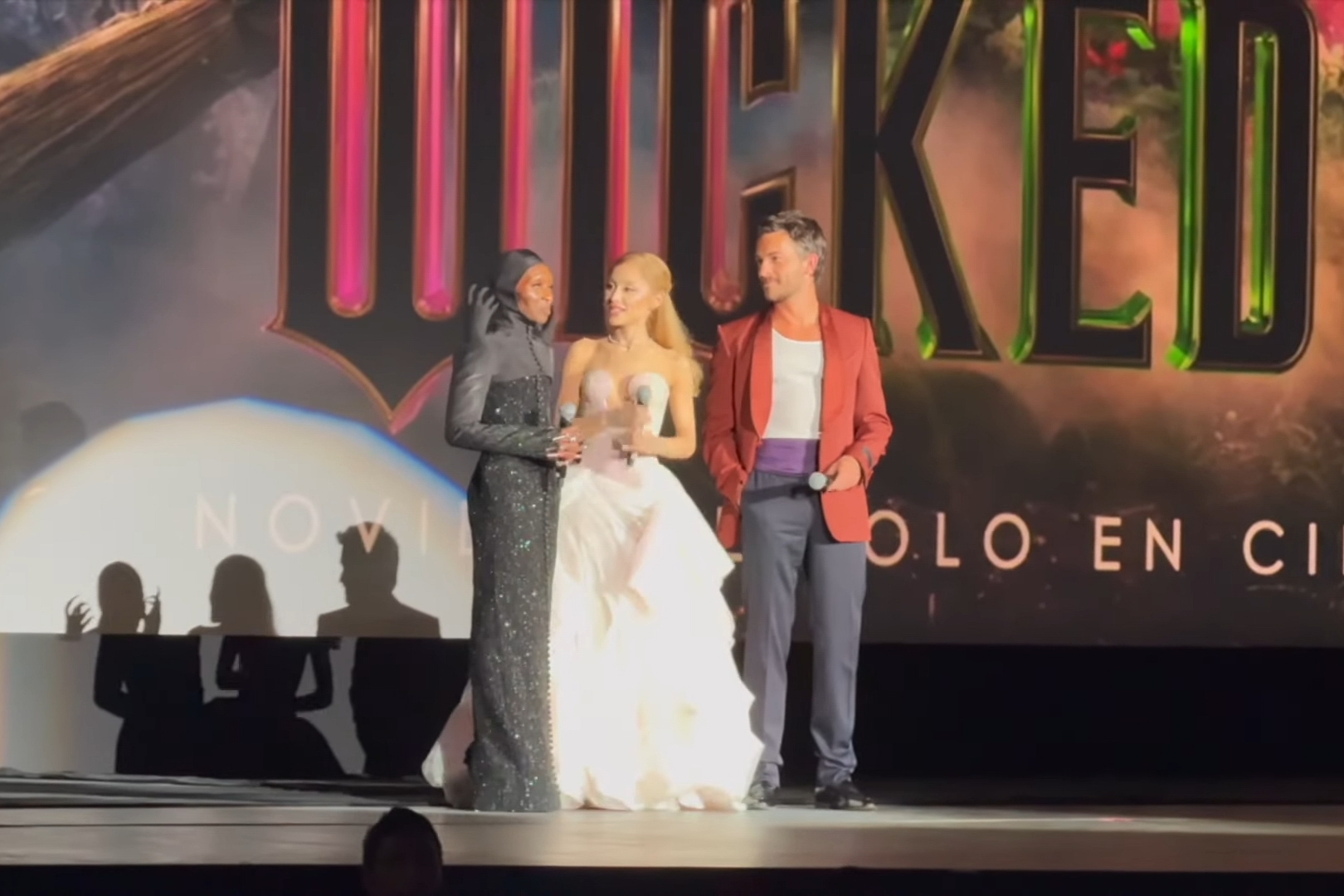
Cynthia Erivo, Ariana Grande, and Jonathan Bailey at the premiere in Mexico

Wicked was previously scheduled for release on December 20, 2019, December 22, 2021, December 25, 2024, and November 27, 2024. The latter's release date was set to avoid competition with Avatar: Fire and Ash and Sonic the Hedgehog 3 (the former of which was later delayed to 2025 after Thunderbolts*, and later Mufasa: The Lion King took its date). It then moved forward to November 22 to avoid competition with Moana 2, with the new date putting it against Gladiator II. This triggered speculation about a scenario later termed "Glicked", similar to the Barbenheimer phenomenon which was a result of Barbie and Oppenheimer both being released on July 21, 2023. With Wicked released two weeks after the 2024 United States presidential election, Marc Platt reflected on the story's increasing relevance in the current political climate, saying, "It's a significant election for both of us, but our story aspires to be about the distance people travel to connect with each other, about seeing the other as not the other, about living in a world where sometimes the truth is not real."

Wicked was re-released in 100 North American theaters on June 4, 2025, with screenings accompanied by the "fan first" trailer premiere for Wicked: For Good. A second re-release took place from November 14–21, while a one-time double feature of Wicked and Wicked: For Good was released in select theaters on November 20.

=== Censorship ===
Prior to its theatrical release in Kuwait, Wicked was pulled from some theatres due to "public ethics". However, it continues to be screened in various cinemas in the country. After its release in the United States, the conservative Christian group One Million Moms called for a boycott, claiming that it "promotes witchcraft and pushes the LGBTQ agenda on families, particularly children". On Instagram, Chenoweth wrote: "Everyone knows the 'one million Moms' are a mere few hundred. Maybe. It's called entertainment. Artistry. I am a Christian woman or [sic] originated the role of Glinda and all the silliness that these women spew out of hate. No no no. I can't help it: I try to love 'em anyways. For they don't get it. For anyone who wants to see girl power, then go so [sic]Wicked. Onstage or in a movie theater."

=== Home media and television ===
Wicked was released on video on demand on December 31, 2024, in the United States. It was released on 4K Blu-ray, Blu-ray, and DVD on February 4, 2025, by Universal Pictures Home Entertainment. Both the digital and physical releases contain the theatrical and sing-along versions, with bonus features such as extended and deleted scenes and behind-the-scenes featurettes. It began streaming on Peacock on March 21, 2025. Wicked made its broadcast television premiere on NBC on November 19, 2025, two days before Wicked: For Good was to be released in theaters.

== Reception ==
=== Box office ===
==== Advanced sales and marketing projections ====
Tickets for Wicked went on sale on October 9, 2024, the day after Paramount Pictures released their tickets for Gladiator II. On October 10, Fandango reported that it was the site's number 2 first-day ticket pre-seller of 2024, behind Marvel Studios' Deadpool & Wolverine, as well as the best PG-rated first-day ticket pre-seller of the year and the number 3 best PG-rated first-day ticket pre-seller of all time, behind Frozen 2 and the 2019 remake of The Lion King (both from Disney). According to Deadline Hollywood, Quorum projected Wicked to gross $67–74 million in its domestic opening weekend, while Box Office Theory projected it would gross $96–150 million and Boxoffice Pro projected it would be $100–125 million, topping the box office ahead of Gladiator II. Initial skepticism was directed towards the notion that musical films post-pandemic would not be profitable. By the week of its release, projections were raised to a $165–200 million worldwide opening (and $125–150 million domestically), with positive word-of-mouth and the awards season buzz cited as the reasons.

==== Performance ====
Wicked grossed $475 million in the United States and Canada, and $283.8 million in other territories, for a worldwide total of $758.8 million. Deadline Hollywood calculated the net profit as $230 million, accounting for production budgets, marketing, talent participations and other costs; box office grosses, television and streaming, and home media revenues, making Wicked the fifth-most profitable film of 2024.

In the United States and Canada, it made $46.47 million on its first day, which included $19.2 million from preview screenings in the week leading up to its release: $2.5 million on Monday, $5.7 million on Wednesday, and $11 million on Thursday. It debuted with $112.5 million domestically and $162.9 million worldwide, topping both box offices. It was the largest opening ever for a film based on a Broadway musical, surpassing the $31.1 million domestic opening of Into the Woods (2014) and the $103 million worldwide opening of Les Misérables (2012). The next Thursday, it made $16.9 million, the second-best Thanksgiving Day total ever behind Moana 2 ($28 million), released the day prior. It grossed $32 million on Black Friday.

Wicked grossed $80 million in its second weekend (and a total of $117.5 million over the five-day frame), dropping by 29% and finishing behind Moana 2. At the end of the holiday weekend, it reached over $250 million domestically, making it the highest-grossing stage musical-to-screen adaptation of all time in North America, beating the $190 million lifetime domestic gross of Grease (1978). In its third weekend, it made $34.9 million, remaining in second, for a running total of $455 million worldwide. By December 15, 2024, it had grossed $525 million worldwide, becoming the highest-grossing film based on Baum's Oz works, surpassing the $493 million worldwide gross of Disney's Oz the Great and Powerful (2013). By Christmas Day, it had grossed $392.4 million domestically, becoming the 49th highest-grossing film of all time in the United States and Canada. By December 29, 2024, Wicked surpassed Mamma Mia! (2008), breaking the Guinness World Record to become the highest-grossing musical film adaptation of all time. By January 2025, it surpassed Dune: Part Two to become the fifth highest-grossing film of 2024, and surpassed E.T. the Extra-Terrestrial (1982) and F9 (2021) to become Universal's third highest-grossing film in North America and nineteenth highest-grossing film worldwide, respectively.

=== Audience viewership ===
In the first week of its release on video-on-demand (VOD) services, Wicked topped the charts on every platform, including iTunes Movies, Google Play, Fandango at Home and Amazon Prime Video. Universal reported that Wicked earned more than $70 million in premium VOD sales in the United States and Canada during its first week, including more than $26 million on New Year's Eve. It surpassed The Super Mario Bros. Movie (2023) to become the biggest first-week performance for a Universal theatrical film on VOD. As of April 2025, the movie's sales revenue across all video platforms exceeds $100 million. During the first weekend of its streaming release on Peacock, Wicked topped Nielsen's preliminary streaming chart for the period of March 17–23, 2025 as the most-streamed film on the platform with 882 million minutes watched, ahead of Plane, The Wild Robot and eventual Best Picture Academy Award winner Anora. The result made it Peacock's biggest Pay 1 film ever for a title in its first seven days and marked the second time a film on the platform has achieved this record following Oppenheimer the year before.

=== Critical response ===
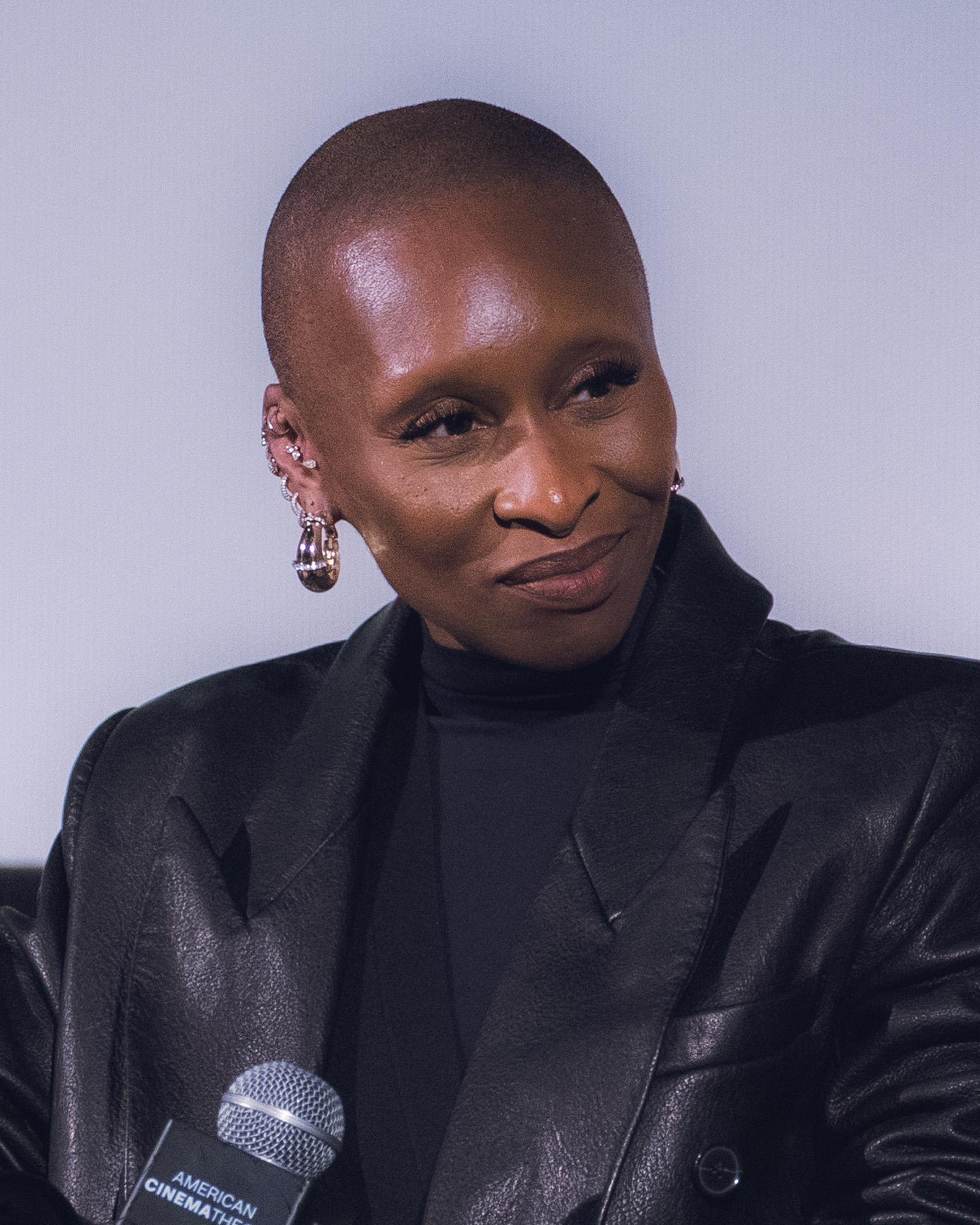
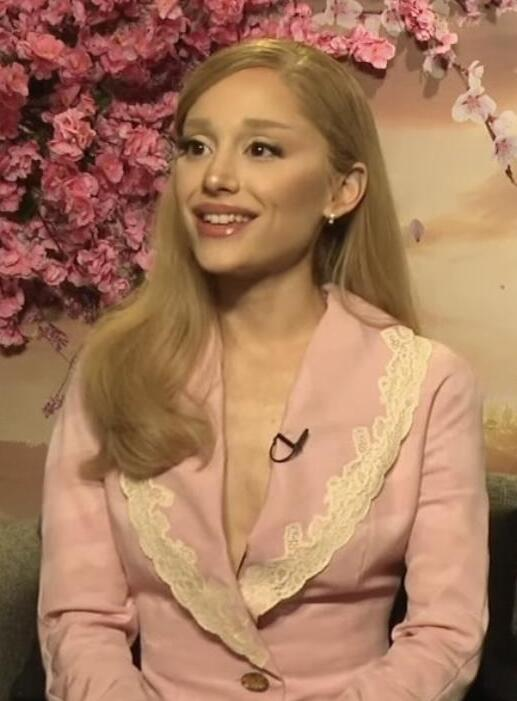
Cynthia Erivo and Ariana Grande garnered widespread acclaim for their performances and chemistry in the film, and earned Academy Award nominations for Best Actress and Best Supporting Actress, respectively.

On the review aggregator website Rotten Tomatoes, 88% of 408 critics' reviews are positive, with an average rating of 7.8/10. The website's consensus reads: "Defying gravity with its magical pairing of Cynthia Erivo and Ariana Grande, Wicked's sheer bravura and charm make for an irresistible invitation to Oz." Metacritic, which uses a weighted average, assigned the film a score of 73 out of 100, based on 63 critics, indicating "generally favorable" reviews. Audiences polled by CinemaScore gave it an average grade of "A" on an A+ to F scale, while those surveyed by PostTrak gave it a 92% overall positive score, with 80% saying they would "definitely recommend" it. This movie scored 6.83 out of 10 on Cine21.

Kyle Smith of The Wall Street Journal called Wicked "the most entertaining film of the year and the most dazzling live-action Hollywood musical since Chicago". Jazz Tangcay of Variety called it "a musical masterpiece that is much more than we could have ever expected" and praised Chu's direction, the performances and the sets and costumes. Antonia Blyth of Deadline Hollywood felt it is "a blast from start to finish" and "a delicious, hilarious romp that shows off Erivo and Grande's next-level talent and laugh-out-loud comedy chops. They serve up every number with surprises, delights and genuine depth." Manohla Dargis of The New York Times wrote that Erivo "is the strongest draw in this splashy, overly long movie", while Gregory Ellwood of The Playlist wrote that Grande "often delivers startling depth to her character before jumping into a musical number that will have you grinning from ear to ear".

Jonathan Bailey was deemed to be a standout performer by Peter Bradshaw of The Guardian. Bradshaw wrote he "uncorks an outrageous scene-stealer as the hetero-camp Fiyero", and by ABC News' Peter Travers, noting that his performance was a "display of song, dance and acting virtuosity". "Dancing Through Life", his character's musical number, was described as "the adaptation's biggest musical accomplishment" by Entertainment Weekly's Christian Holub. The Ozdust Ballroom and "Defying Gravity" scenes were cited as among the best of 2024 by Variety and Looper, respectively. Filmmakers Steven Spielberg, George Lucas, Oliver Stone, Joe Dante, Adam McKay, Sean Baker, Drew Goddard, William Goldenberg, Reinaldo Marcus Green, Laurel Parmet, Rich Peppiatt, Nicholas Stoller and Juel Taylor praised the film. (Note: Attributed to multiple references:)

Odie Henderson of The Boston Globe called Wicked "visually unappealing", commenting that "it can't handle the tonal shifts. Authoritarianism and broad comedy make strange and uneasy bedfellows." Christy Lemire of RogerEbert.com said that "When it's all about the spectacle of big, splashy production numbers, this prequel to The Wizard of Oz is thrilling" but that "far less effective is the way Chu... wedges in the movie's heavier themes of authoritarianism". James Berardinelli of ReelViews wrote that "Although Wicked: Part 1 has its share of high points (some of which aim very high), the filmmakers seem to have embraced the concept of 'bloat' as a beneficial characteristic."

In December 2024, Collider's editorial staff ranked Wicked at number 16 on their list of the "25 Best Musicals of the 21st Century", with David Caballero describing it as a "worthwhile offering with irresistible songs and a few jaw-dropping sequences". The Washington Post named it the 10th-best musical film of the century in February 2025, with Naveen Kumar writing that it "surpasses the stage musical". In March 2025, Time Out named it the 38th-best film musical, writing that "it pops with vibrancy and energy, effervescence and sincerity, adding the odd tweak, expanding the occasional storyline, but largely visualizing the musical in a way that's delighted the many millions who have seen it on stage since its Broadway premiere". In August 2025, listeners of the UK radio station Classic FM voted it number 55 in its annual "Movie Music Hall of Fame" poll.

== Cultural impact ==
"I watched Cynthia Erivo and Ariana Grande as the cameras rolled. Their ability to inhabit their characters – and Jonathan Bailey's ability too – were intimidatingly powerful."

— Author Gregory Maguire in his introduction for the movie tie-in edition of the original novel.

Idina Menzel and Kristin Chenoweth, who originated the roles of Elphaba and Galinda on Broadway, lauded the performances of their film counterparts, with Chenoweth adding: "The whole cast is amazing. Jon Chu nailed it. I was so moved, emotional, happy, filled with joy." Menzel said, "The film is so loving and respectful of the original show, but then builds on it in so many beautiful ways I never thought possible." Lorna Luft, one of the daughters of Judy Garland, who portrayed Dorothy in The Wizard of Oz, called Wicked "breathtaking to look at" and "everything I wanted it to be". Actresses Carol Kane and Sheryl Lee Ralph, both of whom played Madame Morrible on Broadway, in Los Angeles, as well as touring productions of the musical, praised the film, with Kane saying "Having done this show for years, it's sort of amazing that I was still bowled over by what I saw in the film." Mark Hamill, Paul Mescal, Ryan Reynolds, Kieran Culkin, Fernanda Torres, Millie Bobby Brown, Billie Eilish, and Taylor Swift expressed their admiration, with Hamill calling it an "instant classic". (Note: Attributed to multiple references:)

Elle UK's Panashe Nyadundu wrote that Wicked was a "much-needed escape" with a powerful message of kindness and acceptance that was warmly welcomed by audiences in the wake of the 2024 United States presidential election. Nyadundu added: "From LGBTQ+ representation, to shining a light on disabilities, animal rights, female friendship and more, Wicked not only offers escapism to a world of utter fantasy, but equally, acts as a sharp reminder of how to navigate a world marred by corruption and discrimination." In November 2024, a clip from an interview in which the journalist Tracy E. Gilchrist told Erivo and Grande that viewers were "holding space" for the lyrics of "Defying Gravity" went viral, creating multiple memes. Gilchrist later explained what she meant: "For me, it means being in the moment, not being distracted and feeling something on a cellular level... I think you can hold space with lyrics of a song – one you've heard hundreds of times – and it can suddenly take on new meaning when you're a queer person."

The choreography for "What Is This Feeling?" was recreated on TikTok and Instagram Reels by fans and the casts of various Broadway and West End productions. The widespread praise of the "Defying Gravity" scene led Avid to release a 14-minute video breakdown of Myron Kerstein's editing of the sequence on December 23, 2024, showing him analyzing his creative choices using the Media Composer timeline. Kerstein would later repeat this demonstration in person at the 2025 NAB Show on April 5, 2025, as part of a conversation panel with him and Alice Brooks.

=== Potential theme park attractions ===
In February 2025, The New York Times reported that Universal Destinations & Experiences was in early development on creating attractions based on Wicked for one of their theme parks. Some thought they would be added to the Universal Epic Universe park at Universal Orlando sometime after its opening in May 2025 or to the Universal United Kingdom park expected to open in 2031. In January 2026, Universal City Studios LLC applied for a goods and services trademark on the phrase "Oztacular Spectacular".

== Accolades ==
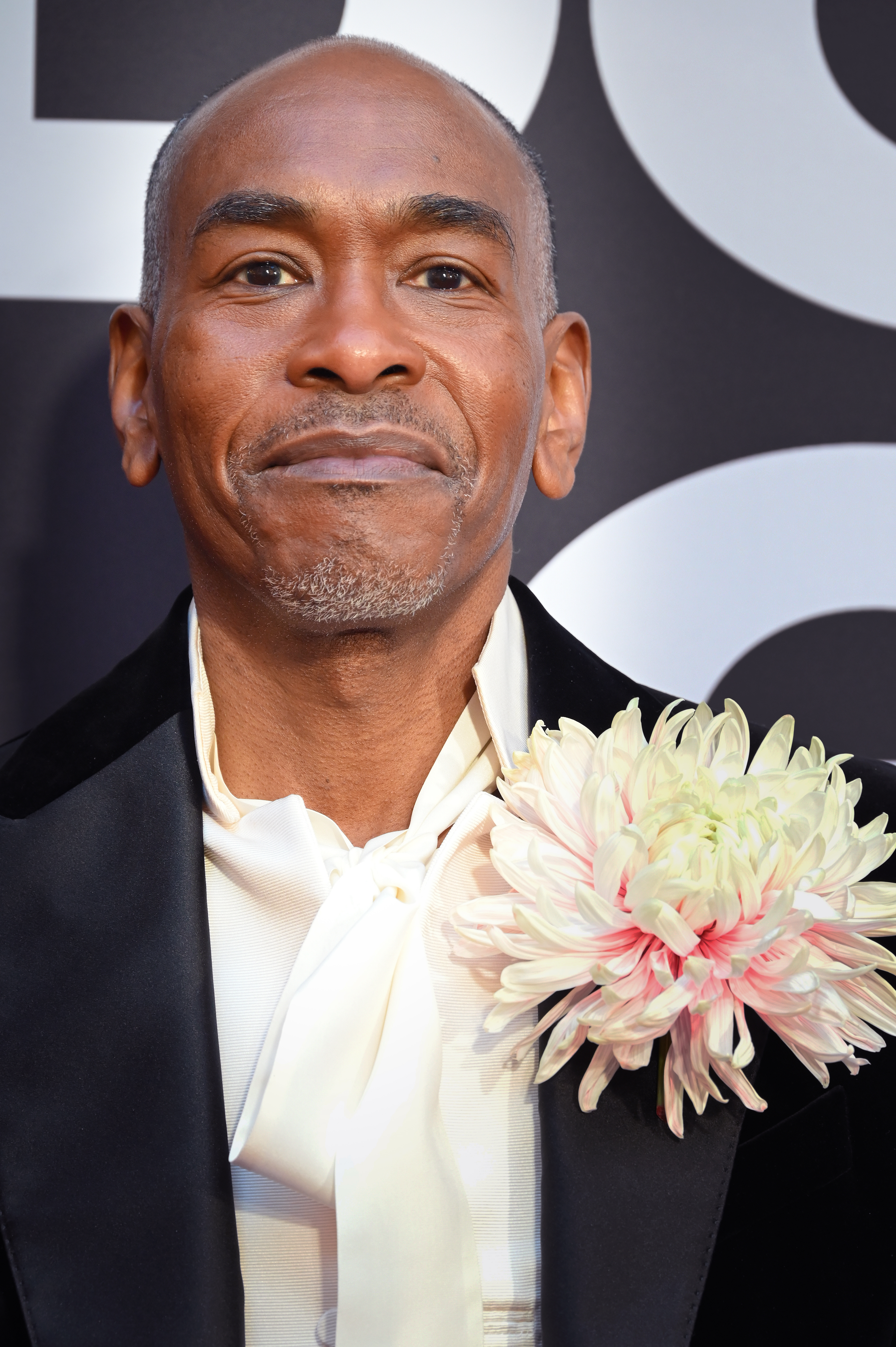
For his work on the film, Paul Tazewell became the first African American male costume designer to win the Academy Award for Best Costume Design.

Wicked received several awards and nominations. It received three awards at the National Board of Review, where it made history as the first fantasy film to win Best Film, and the fourth musical film to win, the first since Moulin Rouge! in 2001. Chu received the award for Best Director, while Erivo and Grande received the NBR Spotlight Award in recognition of their creative collaboration. It additionally was named one of the top 10 films of 2024 by the American Film Institute. The AFI jury rationale states:

Wicked soars into the stratosphere of cinema history–a modern classic born from an evergreen concoction of cultural landmarks. The screen has rarely seen–or heard–towering performances like those delivered by Cynthia Erivo and Ariana Grande, leaving audiences Oz-struck across generations... with Jon M. Chu the wizard behind the curtain, a brilliant creative ensemble creates an immersive world where one fights for what is right while encouraging us to believe we all can fly beyond the rainbow.

At the 82nd Golden Globe Awards, Wicked won Cinematic and Box Office Achievement and received nominations for Best Motion Picture – Musical or Comedy, Best Actress – Motion Picture Musical or Comedy (Cynthia Erivo), and Best Supporting Actress – Motion Picture (Ariana Grande). It tied with Conclave for a leading 11 nominations at the 30th Critics' Choice Awards, and won three: Best Director (Jon M. Chu), Best Production Design (Nathan Crowley and Lee Sandales), and Best Costume Design (Paul Tazewell). It led the 31st Screen Actors Guild Awards with five nominations including Outstanding Performance by a Male Actor in a Supporting Role (Jonathan Bailey), Outstanding Performance by a Cast, and Outstanding Performance by a Stunt Ensemble. Wicked tied with many others as the most nominated film in the ceremony's history.

At the 97th Academy Awards, Wicked tied with The Brutalist for the second-most nominations with 10 total, including Best Picture, Best Actress (Erivo), and Best Supporting Actress (Grande). It won Best Costume Design for Tazewell (who became the first African American male costume designer to win the category) and Best Production Design for Crowley and Sandales. At the 75th American Cinema Editors Eddie Awards, it won Best Edited Feature Film (Comedy, Theatrical) for Myron Kerstein. At the 2025 Kids' Choice Awards, Wicked led with eight nominations and won three, including Favorite Movie, Favorite Movie Actress (Grande), and Favorite Song from a Movie ("Defying Gravity"). At the 68th Annual Grammy Awards, the soundtrack received nominations for Best Compilation Soundtrack for Visual Media and Best Score Soundtrack for Visual Media, while Erivo and Grande won Best Pop Duo/Group Performance for their rendition of "Defying Gravity".

== Sequel ==
Originally announced as one film, Wicked was split into two films in April 2022. The sequel, Wicked: For Good, was released on November 21, 2025, and adapts the events of the musical's second act.

In November 2024, Schwartz and Holzman said they had discussed the possibility of "something" more associated with the Wicked film adaptation, but that it would not necessarily be a Wicked Part Three or Four. They were later reported to be working on a musical film adaptation of The Marvelous Land of Oz, tentatively titled Ozma, which would take place in the world of the original Oz books rather than the Wicked universe. As of June 2026, whether that project is the one that they were alluding to in 2024 or whether it's a separate project has not been confirmed.

== See also ==
- Adaptations of The Wonderful Wizard of Oz
- List of films produced back-to-back
- List of films split into multiple parts
