= Architectural determinism =

Architectural determinism (also sometimes referred to as environmental determinism though that term has a broader meaning) is a theory employed in urbanism, sociology and environmental psychology which claims the built environment is the chief or even sole determinant of social behaviour. A. S. Baum defines the notion thus "In its most extreme form, this position argues that the environment causes certain behaviours, denying any interaction between environment and behaviour. Architectural determinism poses the idea that people can adapt to any arrangement of space and that behaviour in a given environment is caused entirely by the characteristics of the environment."

== History ==
The origins of the concept may be traced in Jeremy Bentham's Panopticon and in the Enlightenment bienfaisance as expressed in the institutional reform of prisons and hospitals. However the notion only gained generally currency and universal applicability with the rise of behaviourism, functionalism and the utopian social programme of the Modernist architectural movement.

The term was first coined by Maurice Broady in his 1966 paper Social theory in Architectural Design which also roundly criticised the authoritarian nature of this belief. While many architects have held the view that architecture can determine behavior and outcome, such as Le Corbusier, Frank Lloyd Wright and Leon Battista Alberti, few architects have espoused the view that design can control behavior, yet it has long been an assumption amongst urbanists and architects that architecture can limit and channel behavior in a predictable manner. Le Corbusier was a large endorser of the theory, believing that design was undoubtfully the overriding cause for behavior and declared that architectural solutions made through design had the power to control human behavior in a predictable and positive way. In his book 'Towards a new architecture, 1923', Le Corbusier speaks on this idea by stating, "All men have the same organism, the same functions. All men have the same needs...I propose one single building for all nations and all climates..." This weaker, positivist view was articulated by Adolf Behne when he asserted "you can kill a man with a building just as easily as with an axe." The determinist belief was a contributory factor in the eventual clearances of numerous public housing complexes of the post-War industrialized world, for example the clearing of the Pruitt-Igoe housing project in St. Louis, Missouri, which was intended to be a safe and idealistic complex yet became a center for rampant crime and vandalism. (For sociological work and research focused on urban renewal, see Herbert J. Gans). Despite being a widely held, if not always articulated theory, the premise was not sustained by social research, for example the studies conducted which led to the coining of the "Hawthorne Effect" originally conducted at the Hawthorne Electric Plant in Cicero, Illinois and later continued by Elton Mayo at Harvard University found no direct correlation between work environment and output, although the study was found to be uncontrolled and methodologically poor. The idea has been argued against, with criticisms explaining that design does influence human behavior but cannot determine human behavior as humans are unpredictable for a variety of reasons, including the complexity of social factors, human agency and free will, and the unpredictable use of build environments over a rigid deterministic view, such as how a building or environment is used during an emergency. The determinist hypothesis as an explanation of social conduct is now most often referred to in the literature as discredited, yet is still to be found as an argument for urban renewal.

== See also ==
- Identity safety cues
- Proxemics
- Social condenser
