= Identity safety cues =

Aspects of a place that reassure people in stigmatized groups

Identity safety cues are aspects of an environment or setting that signal to members of stigmatized groups that the threat of discrimination is limited within that environment and / or that their social identities are welcomed and valued. Identity safety cues have been shown to reduce the negative impacts of social identity threats, which are when people experience situations where they feel devalued on the basis of a social identity (see stereotype threat). Such threats have been shown to undermine performance in academic and work-related contexts and make members of stigmatized groups feel as though they do not belong. Identity safety cues have been proposed as a way of alleviating the negative impact of stereotype threat or other social identity threats, reducing disparities in academic performance for members of stigmatized groups (see achievement gaps in the United States), and reducing health disparities caused by identity related stressors.

Research has shown that identity safety cues targeted towards one specific group can lead individuals with other stigmatized identities to believe their identities will be respected and valued in that environment. Further, the implementation of identity safety cues in existing research did not cause members of non-stigmatized groups feeling threatened or uncomfortable. In fact, some work has suggested that the benefits of identity safety cues extend to members of non-stigmatized groups. For example, implementation of identity safety cues within a university context has been shown to increase student engagement, efficacy, and reduce the average number of student absences for all students, but especially those from stigmatized groups. Several types of identity safety cues have been identified.

== Types of cues ==
=== Diversity philosophies and programing ===
There is evidence suggesting that when individuals or organizations communicate that they value diversity highly, concerns about identity threats are reduced. For example, Hall and colleagues tested the impact of communicating gender inclusive policies on self-reported belonging of women working at engineering firms. Across two studies, Hall and colleagues found that when women working at engineering firms were presented with information communicating gender inclusive policies, they reported increased belonging, fewer concerns about experiencing gender stereotyping in the workplace, and expected to have more pleasant conversations with male coworkers.

Within a classroom context, exposure to information stating that instructors or schools hold multicultural philosophies has been shown to increase student agency, self-confidence, and classroom engagement for students from stigmatized groups. Exposure to diversity philosophies and programming can have a lasting effect. In a recent study, Birnbaum and colleagues had first-year college students read a diversity statement that represented the schools’ diversity philosophy as either being in favor of multiculturalism or colorblindness. The students’ academic progress was tracked over the course of the next two years. Students from stigmatized groups who read the multicultural diversity statement had increased academic performance over the course of the two years compared to students who read the colorblind diversity statement. Similarly, a 2021 study found that when university students were presented with information about equity and non-discrimination policies in the classroom, students from stigmatized groups reported greater belonging within the classroom and reported fewer absences than students who were not presented with the same equity and non-discrimination policies. Further, students in this study also reported perceiving the instructor as behaving in a more inclusive manner and reported greater concerns about addressing social inequities when they were presented with information about equity and non-discrimination policies.

However, the evidence for the effectiveness of diversity philosophies and programming alone is mixed. For example, Valarie Purdie-Jones and colleagues ran a study comparing the effects of Black representation within the workplace and organizational claims of valuing diversity on Black professionals’ sense of organizational trust and belonging. Black professionals who were presented with information showing that an organization a higher number of Black employees reported feeling greater organizational trust and belonging. Similarly, organizational claims of valuing diversity led to an increased sense of organizational trust and belonging. However, the type of diversity philosophy communicated influenced how effective the philosophy was at increasing organizational trust and belong. Black professionals who received information stating that the organization held a color-blind philosophy of diversity (i.e., the idea that differences are insignificant and should not be attended to; See Color Blindness) felt lower organizational trust and belonging than Black professionals who received information stating that the organization held a multicultural perspective (i.e., the idea that differences between social groups are meaningful as diverse perspectives offer unique insight and strengths; See Multiculturalism). Similarly, a 2015 study from Wilton and colleagues exposed participants to either a colorblind or multicultural diversity statement and then measured their expectations about anticipated bias and racial and gender diversity. Participants who were exposed to a colorblind diversity statement expected to experience increased levels of bias and expected less racial and gender diversity than participants who were exposed to a multicultural diversity statement.

=== Minority representation cues ===
One form of identity safety cues that has shown promise is invoking the real or imagined presence of other members of stigmatized groups as a way of suggesting that ones’ social identity will not be devalued and are safe. The majority of this work has been done amongst racial minorities and women in contexts where they represent a numerical minority (e.g., STEM contexts, in male dominated workplaces). For example, a 2007 study explored the impacts of signaling balanced versus unbalanced gender ratios in STEM on belonging for female and male STEM majors. In this study, women who watch a video that showed a much larger number of men at a STEM conference exhibited greater levels of cognitive and physiological vigilance, reported a lower sense of belonging, and less desire to participate in the conference. However, women who watched a video showing a roughly equal number of men and women at the same STEM conference exhibited less vigilance, reported a heightened sense of belonging, and a greater desire to participate in the conference. Men's vigilance, sense of belonging, and desire to participate in the conference were unaffected by watching either video.

Having a role model with a shared stigmatized identity (e.g., female students having a female professor role model) has also been shown to have similar positive effects. For example, a 2019 study explored the effects of having a Roma or non-Roma role model on Roma children in Slovakia. Presenting Roma children with a known role model from their ethnic group was shown to increase academic achievement and reduce stereotype threat, as opposed to presenting children of role models from different ethnic groups. Similarly, research has found that being exposed to a female role model can help to reduce the identity threat women experience after being exposed to information about the biases women face in STEM.

Even though the majority of this work has been done in STEM contexts, similar work has been done in the context of the workplace. For instance, a 2008 study found that Black professionals who were presented with information showing that an organization had a higher number of Black employees felt a greater sense of trust and belonging in that organization compared to Black professionals who were presented with information showing that an organization had a small number of Black employees. However, for these cues to be effective, they must reasonably reflect the actual percentage of individuals that hold a stigmatized identity within a given context. A 2020 study found that whenever racial and ethnic minorities perceive an organization as falsely inflating the percent of employees that hold a stigmatized identity, racial and ethnic minorities report increased concerns about belonging, performance, and expressing themselves.

=== Environmental features ===
Environmental cues are features of an environment that reduce identity threat by communicating inclusive norms and values. Typically, these cues include background objects (e.g., posters, items on a table) or counter-stereotypic imagery (e.g., a rainbow flag in a gym predominantly frequented by heterosexual men and women). Studies exploring the impact of environmental cues on belonging in STEM by members of marginalized groups have found strong evidence for the power of environmental cues to influence one's sense of belonging and concerns about discrimination. For example, a 2009 study found that changing objects in a computer science classroom from objects considered stereotypical of computer science (e.g., Star Trek poster, video games) to non-stereotypical objects (e.g., nature poster, phone books) increased female STEM majors’ sense of belonging and interest in computer science by reducing associations between computer science and masculine stereotypes. In a different domain, the presence of gender-inclusive bathrooms is associated with greater perceived fairness within the workplace, more positive perceptions of workplace climate for women and racial and ethnic minorities, and increased perceptions of the workplace as egalitarian.

The presence of environmental cues has also been associated with differences in academic outcomes as well. For example, a 2013 study randomly assigned male and female students to give a persuasive speech in a virtual-reality classroom that had a photograph of a male world leader, a female world leader, or no photograph. When the room featured either a photograph of a male world leader or no picture, male students gave speeches that were longer and rated as better than the female students’ speeches. However, the presence of female leader photographs increased female students’ speaking time and their speeches were rated as higher quality. In a similar study, American Indian high school students who were randomly assigned to see stereotypic American Indian imagery in a classroom (e.g., Chief Wahoo of the Cleveland Indians) were less likely to mention academic achievement when asked about where they imagined themselves in the future than American Indian students who saw no image or a counter-stereotypic poster of an American Indian woman in front of a microscope.

=== Identity safe information ===
Another form of identity safety cues that has shown promise is providing members of stigmatized groups with information that reduces the importance or relevance of negative stereotypes, conveys non-biased expectations, and/or conveys a positive climate for members of stigmatized groups. The majority of this work has been done in academic contexts in order to reduce the impact of stereotype threat. For example, a prominent 1999 study explored if stereotype threat among female students could be reduced by telling the class that prior administrations of the math exam they were about to take had revealed no gender differences in performance. When students were informed that they were taking a “gender fair” math exam, female students performed equally well to male students taking the same exam. However, when female students were told before that the exam had been shown to produce gender differences, female students performed worse than male students. Similarly, telling women that there are no differences in women's and men's leadership abilities has been shown to eliminate gender gaps in leadership aspirations.

However, other studies have found that merely providing identity safe information alone is sometimes not enough to reduce stereotype threat or identity threat. For example, in one study women were presented with a text explaining that stereotypes and not gender differences were responsible for academic performance gaps between men and women and were then asked to complete a math task. It was found that women who were presented with information about stereotype threat and gender differences in academic outcomes performed significantly worse at the math task.

More recently, information about expectations for discrimination (or lack thereof) have also been explored as an identity safety cue. For example, a 2020 study from Murrar and colleagues explored the impact of informing university students that most of their peers endorsed positive diversity related values, cared strongly about inclusion in university classrooms, and typically behaved in a non-discriminatory manner. Being presented with this information caused all students, regardless of their background, to evaluate classroom climate more positively and to report more positive attitudes toward members of stigmatized groups. Further, students from stigmatized groups reported greater sense of belonging and better self-reported physical health. In a similar study, Black women who were informed of the presence of a non-Black female ally reported an increased sense of belonging in the workplace.

== Contexts ==
=== Education ===
Much of the research on identity safety cues came from early attempts to mitigate the detrimental effects of stereotype threat. For instance, one of the first studies to use what is now known as an identity safety cue explored the impact of telling female students that there were no gender differences in a math exam (i.e., presenting identity safe information). A large portion of current research on identity safety cues continues to explore ways to reduce educational disparities between members of stigmatized groups and members of stigmatized groups.

=== Workplace ===
Another major focus of identity safety cue research is on methods that can successfully increase the belonging and retention of members of stigmatized groups within the workplace. For example, a 2015 study explored the impact of different philosophies of intelligence on female employees expectations to be stereotyped in the workplace and organizational belonging. When a consulting company displayed the belief that intelligence and abilities are malleable on their mission statement or website compared to the belief that intelligence is fixed women trusted the company more and expected to be stereotyped less. However, gender representation within the company did not affect women's trust in the company. Similarly, a 2019 study found that Latina women felt greater trust, belonging, and interest in a fictional STEM company when learning about a Latinx scientist employee than a White scientist (regardless of the gender of the scientist). More recently, a 2021 study explored whether the presence of an employee's pronouns in an employee biography acted as an identity-safety cue for sexual and gender minorities. The inclusion of pronouns resulted in more positive organizational attitudes among gender and sexual minority participants and increased perceptions of coworker allyship, regardless of whether the disclosure of pronouns was required or optional by the organization.

=== Healthcare ===
While the majority of research on identity safety cues has been done in either academic or workplace contexts, there has been a recent push to explore the effectiveness of these cues in healthcare contexts to see if they can help address disparities in health outcomes between members of stigmatized groups and members of non-stigmatized groups. For example, a recent study explored the impact of minority representation cues and communicating organizational diversity philosophies on Black and Latinx participants’ perceptions of a physicians’ racial biases, cultural competence, and general expectations of a visit with that physician. While physicians’ diversity statements did not influence participants’ anticipated quality of the visit, being informed that the physician had a diverse clientele increased greater anticipated comfort and perceptions of receiving better treatment for Black and Latinx participants. Similarly, in another recent study, researchers explored how minority representation cues and physicians’ diversity statements might influence sexual minorities’ perceptions of physician bias, cultural competence, anticipated comfort, expectations, and comfort disclosing their sexuality while visiting a physician. Both the diversity statement and minority representation cues reduced perceptions of physician bias, but only minority representation cues increased perceptions of the physician as culturally competent, increased anticipated comfort and quality, and led to greater comfort disclosing their sexuality. Related work has also been done with fathers in medical contexts. For instance, a 2019 study found that prenatal doctor's offices with environmental safety cues (e.g., pictures of fathers with babies) increased expectant fathers’ comfort with attending prenatal appointments and led to greater parenting confidence, comfort, increased intentions to learn about pregnancy, and greater intentions engage in healthy habits to aid their partner (e.g., avoiding smoking and alcohol during their partner's pregnancy).

=== Religion ===
Very little research has been done on identity safety cues within religious spaces, especially for groups historically excluded or rejected from these spaces, like the LGBTQIA+ communities. In recent years this has changed, at least within Christianity, with researchers in the US finding that churches that clearly and visibly include the LGBTQIA+ communities through cues such as the pride flag, the use of pronouns, representation of queer leadership, and engagement with the LGBTQIA+ communities inside and outside of the church, significantly help LGBTQIA+ attendees to feel like they belong. It is worth pointing out that LGBTQIA+-affirming cues did not significantly decrease feelings of belonging in straight Christians. The study was replicated in Switzerland and similar results were found. From an evolutionary perspective, humans have always relied on cues (e.g., visual, verbal) to deduce whether they belong within their group(s) or not, which is an important determinant of physical and mental health. Thus, identity safety cues within churches are doubly important for LGBTQIA+ people who have historically been excluded from these spaces, and the use of the above mentioned cues for supporting LGBTQIA+ people can improve the wellbeing of LGBTQIA+ Christians.

== See also ==
- Architectural determinism
- Health equity
- Proxemics
- Racial achievement gap in the United States
