= Jean White =

British nurse and pastor

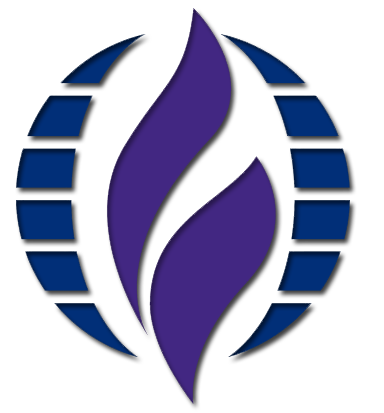
Logo for Metropolitan Community Church

Jean White (1941 – 8 November 2010) was the founding pastor within the Metropolitan Community Church (MCC) in London. She was a nurse, midwife, missionary, pastor, counselor, and campaigner for the LGBTQ community and their inclusion in the Church.

She received her training as a State Registered Nurse at the London Teaching Hospital, Whitechapel, London. Later she received training as a Midwife in Bristol and at the Elsie Ingles School of Midwifery in Edinburgh, and undertook a course in Tropical Diseases at the Hospital for Tropical Diseases in Liverpool. In 1963–64, White studied at the International Bible Training Institute in Burgess Hill, Sussex, and in Stockholm, Sweden. In 1964 she went as a medical missionary to Macao. She served as a missionary in Asia from 1964–70. Three of those years were spent under “compound arrest” in the “no-man’s area”, between Macao and the mainland of China, during the Red Guard uprising. While in China White became aware she needed to be honest about her sexuality and when she returned to London she came out as a lesbian and joined a group called Fellowship of Christ the Liberator, which was a prayer group for LGBTQ people.

As founding pastor of the MCC, White served on the denomination's Board of Elders and served the original Metropolitan Community Church of London for many years. She worked as director of World Church Extension of the denomination. She was pastor of MCC, South London, at the time of her death.

Her long-time partner was Mary Smail, a church musician and MCC lay leader. White died on 8 November 2010, aged 69, following a battle with pancreatic cancer.
