= Peter Heller =

Peter Heller may refer to:

- Pete Heller, English electronic and house music producer
- Peter Heller (writer), American author (including the 2012 novel The Dog Stars) and kayaker
- Peter W. Heller (born 1957), German politician, environmental scientist, and venture philanthropist
- Peter Heller (academic) (1920–1998), Austrian-American academic and 1982 Guggenheim Fellowship winner
- Peter Heller (physicist), 1972 Guggenheim Fellowship winner
- Peter Heller (tennis), German tennis player
- Peter Heller, producer of the 2006 film Dreamland
