= Gladiator II =

2024 film by Ridley Scott

- Theatrical release poster
- Directed by: Ridley Scott
- Screenplay by: David Scarpa
- Story by: Peter Craig; David Scarpa
- Based on: Characters by David Franzoni
- Produced by: Ridley Scott; Michael Pruss; Douglas Wick; Lucy Fisher; David Franzoni
- Starring: Paul Mescal; Pedro Pascal; Joseph Quinn; Fred Hechinger; Connie Nielsen; Denzel Washington
- Cinematography: John Mathieson
- Edited by: Claire Simpson; Sam Restivo
- Music by: Harry Gregson-Williams
- Production companies: Scott Free Productions; Red Wagon Entertainment
- Distributed by: Paramount Pictures
- Release dates: October 30, 2024 (Sydney); November 15, 2024 (United Kingdom); November 22, 2024 (United States)
- Running time: 148 minutes
- Countries: United Kingdom; United States
- Language: English
- Budget: $310 million (gross); $210 million (net)
- Box office: $462.2 million

Gladiator II is a 2024 historical film directed and produced by Ridley Scott. The sequel to Gladiator (2000), it was written by David Scarpa based on a story he wrote with Peter Craig. The film was produced by Scott Free Productions and Red Wagon Entertainment and distributed by Paramount Pictures. It stars Paul Mescal, Pedro Pascal, Joseph Quinn, Fred Hechinger, Connie Nielsen, and Denzel Washington. Derek Jacobi and Nielsen reprise their roles from the first film, with Mescal replacing Spencer Treat Clark. Mescal portrays Lucius Verus Aurelius, the exiled Prince of Rome, who becomes a prisoner of war and fights as a gladiator for Macrinus, a former slave who plots to overthrow the twin emperors Caracalla and Geta.

A sequel to Gladiator was discussed as early as June 2001, with David Franzoni and John Logan set to return as screenwriters. Over the next few years, Scott offered occasional updates, including the possible involvement of the original film's lead actor, Russell Crowe, along with plot ideas about the Roman afterlife and different historical time periods. Development was halted when DreamWorks Pictures was sold to Paramount in 2006. The film was finally announced in 2018, and Mescal was cast in the lead role in January 2023, with a script by David Scarpa. Filming took place between June 2023 and January 2024, with a five-month delay due to the 2023 Hollywood labor disputes.

Gladiator II premiered in Sydney, Australia, on October 30, 2024, and was released in the United Kingdom on November 15 and in the United States on November 22. The film received generally positive reviews from critics, although it was considered inferior to its predecessor, and grossed $462.2 million worldwide. It received two nominations at the 82nd Golden Globe Awards: Cinematic and Box Office Achievement and Best Supporting Actor for Washington, and was nominated for Best Costume Design at the 97th Academy Awards.

== Plot ==
Sixteen years after Marcus Aurelius's death, (Note: As depicted in Gladiator (2000)) Rome is ruled by the twin emperors Caracalla and Geta. In the North African kingdom of Numidia, Hanno lives with his wife, Arishat. The Roman army led by General Justus Acacius invades and conquers the kingdom, killing Arishat and enslaving Hanno along with the other survivors.

The enslaved people are taken to Ostia, where the Romans pit them against baboons to advertise them as potential gladiators. Hanno savagely kills one, impressing the stable master Macrinus, who promises Hanno an opportunity to kill Acacius if he wins enough fights in Rome. Meanwhile, Acacius returns to Rome as a war hero. Caracalla and Geta prepare gladiatorial games in the Colosseum to celebrate. Acacius asks for a break from war with his wife Lucilla, also Aurelius' daughter, but the emperors refuse and instead want him to join in their plans to conquer Persia and India respectively.

Senator Thraex hosts a party for the emperors, featuring a gladiatorial duel. After Hanno wins, he recites a verse from Virgil's Aeneid, revealing his Roman education and raising Macrinus' suspicion. Acacius and Lucilla conspire with Thraex and Senator Gracchus to overthrow the emperors and restore the Republic. Hanno emulates the legendary gladiator Maximus to defeat Glyceo the Destroyer and his black rhinoceros. Lucilla realizes that Hanno is actually her son Lucius Verus, whom she sent away as a child to protect him from rivals for the throne after the death of her evil brother Commodus.

Lucilla visits Lucius and tries reconnecting with him, but he angrily rebuffs her, believing she had abandoned him. Lucilla reveals to Lucius that he is Maximus' son and tells him to use his father's strength to survive. During a naval battle in the Colosseum, Lucius leads the gladiators to victory and fires a crossbow at Acacius, but fails to kill him. Lucius later befriends Ravi, the gladiators' physician who shows him the shrine to Maximus, which includes the latter's sword and armor.

That night, Lucilla and Acacius conspire to free Lucius as part of their plot to dethrone the emperors. Thraex, who owes Macrinus money, informs him of the conspiracy; Lucilla and Acacius are arrested for treason. Macrinus advises the emperors to have Acacius killed in the Colosseum and arranges for Lucius to fight him. After a brief fight, Acacius surrenders to Lucius and professes his love for Lucilla and Maximus. Lucius refuses to execute Acacius, who is then killed when the Praetorian Guard fire multiple arrows at him at the emperors' command. However, Acacius' death ends up causing the people to riot. When Macrinus questions Lucius' refusal to kill Acacius, Lucius argues that Rome can be better.

Macrinus tricks Caracalla into believing that Geta will blame him for the riot; Caracalla kills Geta with Macrinus' help. Lucilla and Lucius reconcile; she gives him her father's ring, which also belonged to Maximus and Acacius. Increasingly delusional, Caracalla names his monkey, Dondus, as a consul alongside Macrinus. Macrinus persuades the Senate that he can restore order and assumes control of the Praetorians. He reveals to Lucilla that he was a slave under Aurelius and vows to avenge himself by becoming emperor. Macrinus convinces Caracalla to have Lucilla executed in the Colosseum with only Lucius to defend her, hoping their deaths will trigger another riot that the Senate will defuse by executing Caracalla.

Lucius sends Ravi with the ring to request military aid from Acacius' legions outside Rome. Lucilla is brought into the Colosseum, accompanied by the senators with whom she conspired, while Lucius rallies the gladiators to revolt against their enslavers. Armed with Maximus' sword and armor, he leads the gladiators to defend Lucilla against her captors. Gracchus is killed in the onslaught, while Macrinus kills Caracalla before fatally shooting Lucilla with an arrow just before Lucius can save her; Lucilla dies in front of Lucius, who promptly chases Macrinus as the latter flees the rioting city.

Acacius' legions and Macrinus' Praetorians confront each other outside Rome just as Lucius catches up to Macrinus in between the two armies. To prevent a battle, Lucius reveals his identity as the imperial heir. He then duels Macrinus and ultimately kills him, before persuading both armies to unite with him for a stronger Rome.

In the aftermath, Lucius mourns his parents in the Colosseum later that night.

== Cast ==
- Paul Mescal as Lucius Verus Aurelius / "Hanno": The grandson of the former emperor Marcus Aurelius and son of Lucilla and Maximus. Following his father's death, Lucius was sent away from Rome as a child by his mother, Lucilla, to protect him from assassins. They have not met in around 15 years. Lucius lives with his wife in Numidia but is taken prisoner by the Roman army after they invade his home and kill his wife. He is sold into slavery to become a gladiator in the Colosseum. He seeks revenge against the Romans and their general, Acacius. Alfie Tempest portrays a young Lucius.
- Pedro Pascal as Acacius: A general of the Roman army who trained under Maximus, and Lucilla's husband. Although he lives a luxurious lifestyle in Rome, he spends most of his time away on military campaigns for the emperors. He leads an army to take over Numidia and invades Lucius' home, but is disillusioned by war and does not want to lead more men to die for the emperors. Acacius conspires with Lucilla to overthrow the emperors but is arrested and reduced to fighting as a gladiator in the Colosseum. According to Pascal, he is "a very, very good general, which can mean a very good killer", serving as a symbol to Lucius of everything he hates.
- Connie Nielsen as Lucilla: Lucius' mother, Maximus' former lover, and Aurelius' daughter. She sent Lucius away from Rome after Maximus' death to protect him from rivals for the imperial throne. Following Maximus' death, she marries Acacius. She watches Lucius fight in the Colosseum but initially does not recognize him as her son. Due to her popularity among the people of Rome, she is feared and exploited by those in power, such as the emperors. Nielsen reprises her role from the first film.
- Denzel Washington as Macrinus (loosely inspired by the historical figure Marcus Opellius Macrinus): A former Aethiope slave who plans to control Rome. He keeps a stable of gladiators and mentors Lucius. He also works as an arms dealer, providing weapons, food, and oil to the Roman armies in Europe. Director Ridley Scott described him as "pretty fucking cruel" to the arena fighters, with Washington adding that he "wants to be Emperor and he's willing to do anything to get there". Scott also noted that Macrinus has a "twinkle" of bisexuality, describing him as a gangster who started as a prisoner of war, became a gladiator, and earned his freedom. Washington said that a scene involving Macrinus kissing another man was deleted from the film, a claim that was later disputed by Scott.
- Joseph Quinn as Emperor Geta: The co-emperor of Rome alongside his brother, Caracalla. Scott described the pair as "damaged goods from birth" who are "almost a replay of Romulus and Remus", with another inspiration being Beavis and Butt-Head from the MTV adult cartoon of the same name. Quinn took inspiration from Philip Seymour Hoffman's Owen Davian from Mission: Impossible III (2006) and Gary Oldman's Jean-Baptiste Emanuel Zorg from The Fifth Element (1997) for playing his character, not wanting to copy Joaquin Phoenix's performance as Commodus from the previous film. One inspiration for Geta's look was John Lydon.
- Fred Hechinger as Emperor Caracalla: The co-emperor of Rome alongside his brother, Geta. He historically has a pet Capuchin monkey named Dondus, and is less stable than his brother due to cognitive erosion in his brain. Hechinger discussed with Scott about finding inspirations to build Caracalla's look from Sid Vicious, with Caracalla's pet monkey serving as another inspiration for the character's "crazed behavior".
- Lior Raz as Viggo: The trainer of gladiators for Macrinus. A former gladiator, Viggo is a "tough guy" who escorts the gladiators to their fights.
- Derek Jacobi as Senator Gracchus: A member of the Roman Senate who opposes the growing corruption of the Imperial Court. Jacobi reprises his role from the first film.
- Peter Mensah as Jugurtha: A black Numidian chieftain who mentored Lucius after the latter was exiled from Rome, with whom he is later enslaved and forced to become a gladiator.
- Matt Lucas as the Master of Ceremonies: The Colosseum's public address announcer.
- Alexander Karim as Ravi: A former gladiator from Varanasi, India who earned his freedom and then chose to serve as a doctor to wounded combatants.
- Tim McInnerny as Senator Thraex: A gambling-addicted, corrupt member of the Roman Senate who owes Macrinus a tremendous amount of money.
- Richard McCabe as Quaestor.
- Rory McCann as Tegula: The leader of the Praetorian Guard.
- Yuval Gonen as Arishat: Lucius' wife, a skilled archer who is killed during the Roman invasion of their home.
- Alec Utgoff as Darius: Acacius' second-in-command, whom Acacius recruits to mount a coup against the corrupt emperors.
- Yann Gael as Bostar.
- Alexander Simkin as Glyceo the Destroyer: a gladiator riding a black rhinoceros.

Egyptian-Palestinian actress May Calamawy, who was originally set to play Fortuna, an "important character", appears in the film in an uncredited non-speaking background role as Macrinus' companion. Some publications linked her omission to the ongoing Gaza war and her support for Palestine in the Israeli–Palestinian conflict. (Note: Multiple references:)

== Production ==
=== Development ===
In June 2001, developments for a Gladiator (2000) follow-up began for either a prequel or sequel, with David Franzoni in early negotiations to once again serve as screenwriter. Ridley Scott's logic to make a sequel was that, even though Maximus Decimus Meridius died at the end of the original film, what happened to Lucius Verus was left ambiguous, considering the questions about his whereabouts perfect for a second film. The following year, a sequel was announced to be moving forward with John Logan serving as screenwriter. The plot, set 15 years later, included the Praetorian Guards ruling Rome, and an older Lucius—the son of Lucilla in Gladiator—searching for the truth about his biological father. Franzoni signed on as producer, alongside Douglas Wick and Walter Parkes. In December 2002, the film's plot was announced to include prequel events regarding the parentage of Lucius, as well as sequel events depicting the resurrection of Maximus. The producers and Russell Crowe, who portrayed Maximus, collaboratively and extensively researched ancient Roman beliefs regarding the afterlife. Although Crowe and Scott had discussed how to bring the former back by having his character resurrect, Scott concluded that Crowe would have to return either as Maximus' double or play another character. By September 2003, Scott announced that the script was completed, while confirming that the story would primarily center on Lucius.

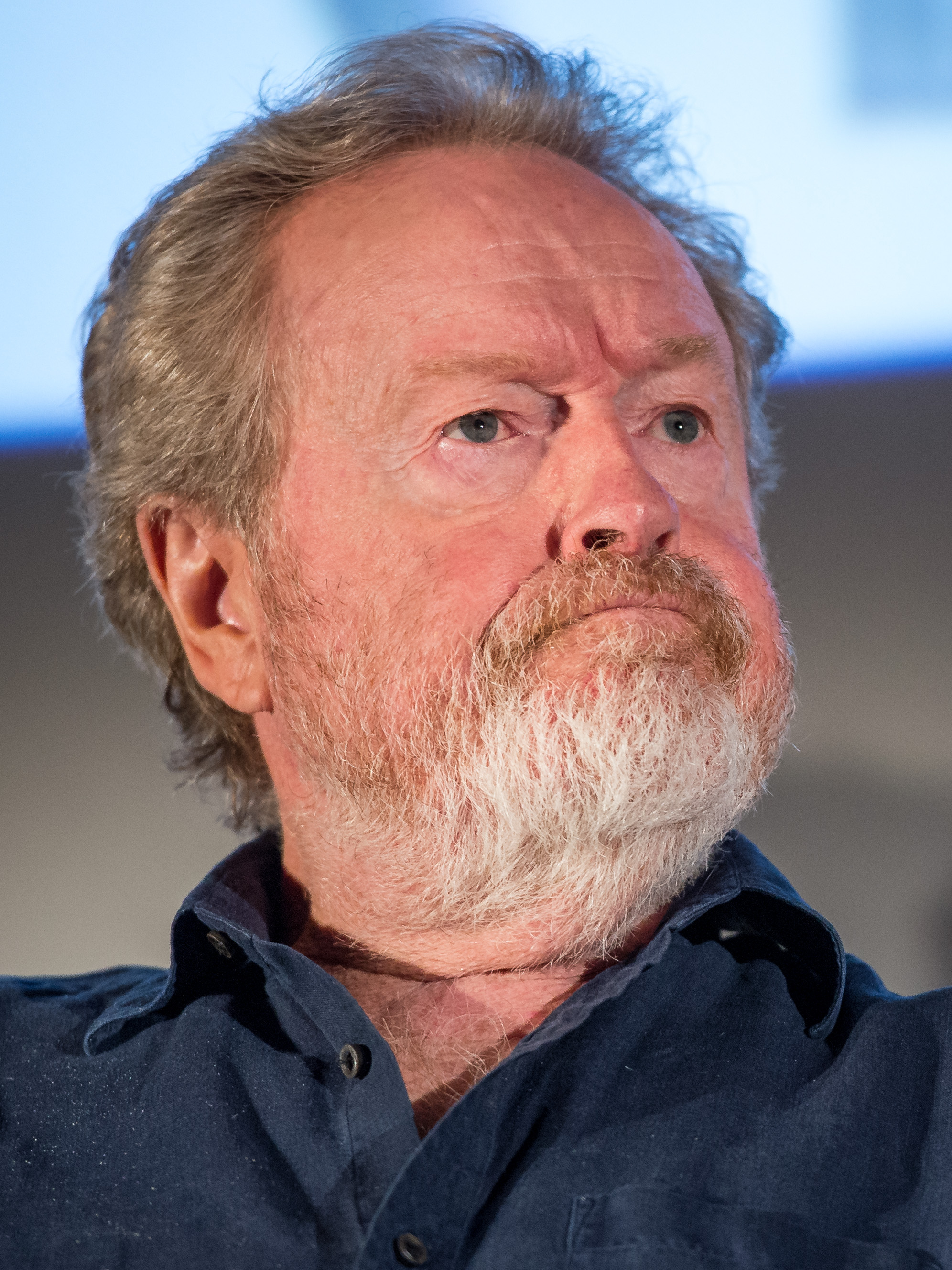
Ridley Scott returned to direct Gladiator II two decades after the original.

In May 2006, Scott stated that DreamWorks Pictures had wanted to make the sequel, but there were differing ideas for the story. Crowe had favoured a fantasy element in bringing Maximus back to life, while the studio were basing the film on Lucius as the son of Maximus and Lucilla. Scott also discussed the necessity of a more complex script with the corruption of Rome in the potential sequel. During this time, Nick Cave was commissioned to write a new draft of the script. It was written under the working title of "Christ Killer". Cave described the plot as a "deities vs. deity vs. humanity" story. The story involved Maximus in purgatory, who is resurrected as an immortal warrior for the Roman gods. Maximus is sent back to Earth and tasked with ending Christianity by killing Jesus and his disciples, as Christianity was draining the power of the ancient Pagan gods. During his mission, Maximus is tricked into murdering his own son. Cursed to live forever, Maximus fights in the Crusades, World War II and the Vietnam War; with the ending revealing that in the present-day, the character now works at the Pentagon. The script was rejected and scrapped after Steven Spielberg, who had consulted on the original film, told Scott it wasn't going to work, especially as Cave had written something "too grand" due to his theatre work.

After experiencing financial difficulties in the 2000s, DreamWorks Pictures—including the rights to Gladiator and the rest of the pre-2006 live-action film library—was sold to Paramount Pictures in 2006 and development on the sequel was halted. Over the years, other attempts on a sequel script were made, but Scott felt that many writers "were afraid to take it on". He also said that he and everyone involved in the original film were busy so no one thought about making a sequel, but as time passed, he noticed how well Gladiator aged to the point of seemingly having "taken a life of its own" that it made him feel that he owed the audience a continuation to that story. Scott became determined to not let go of the project, deciding to do it for both creative and financial reasons if a good idea came up. In March 2017, Scott said that the difficulties of reintroducing Maximus had been resolved. The filmmaker expressed enthusiasm for the future of the project, while discussions with Crowe to reprise his role were ongoing.

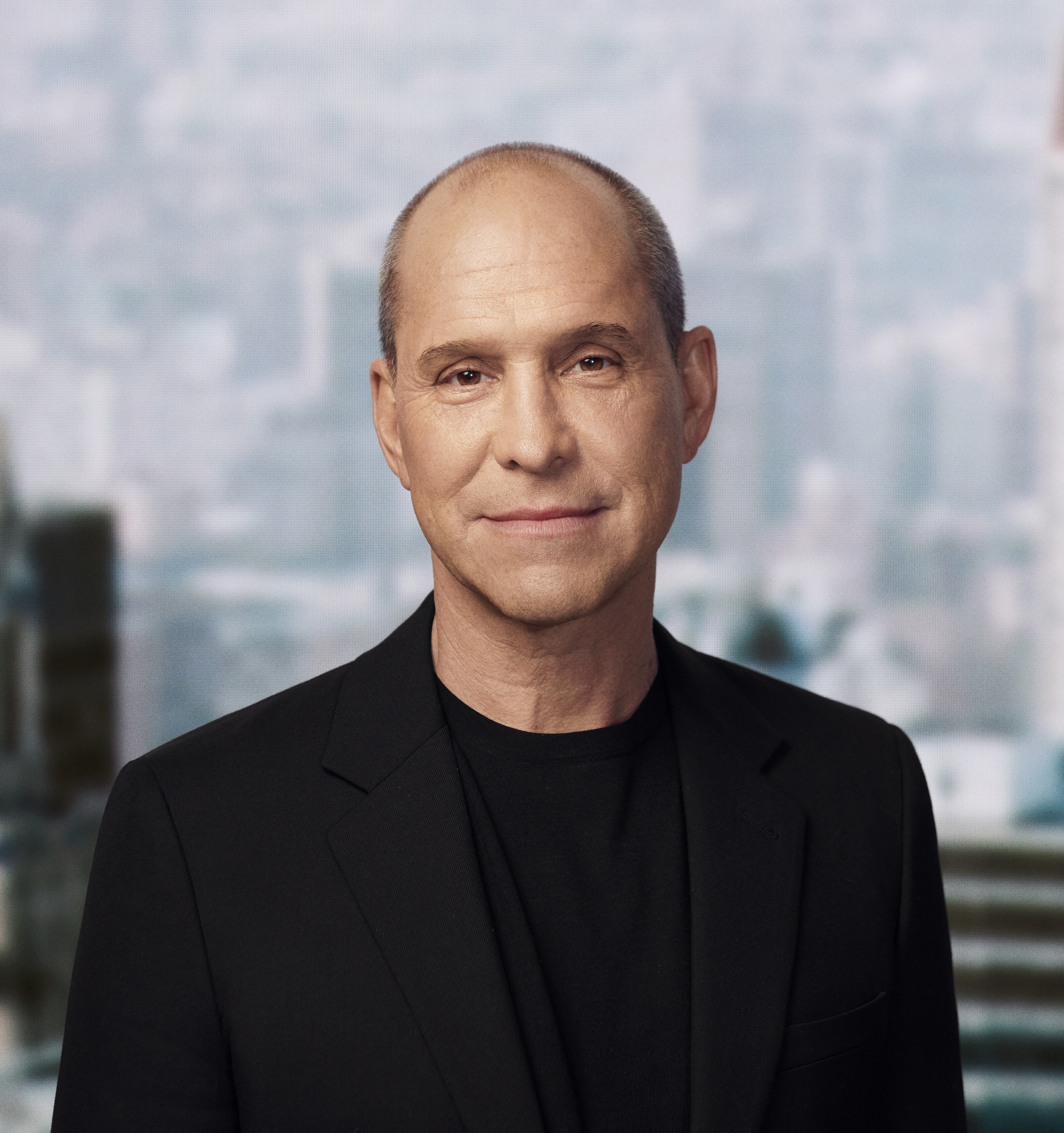
Paramount Pictures CEO Brian Robbins worked with Ridley Scott on Gladiator II.

A version of the script featured Maximus in a brief flashback cameo appearance in the final scene. In November 2018, it was announced that Paramount was greenlighting the development of a sequel. Scott was in early negotiations to once again serve as director, with a script written by Peter Craig. Scott would also serve as producer alongside Douglas Wick, Lucy Fisher, Walter Parkes, and Laurie MacDonald, with the project being a joint-venture production between Paramount, Scott Free Productions, Red Wagon Entertainment, and Parkes+ MacDonald Image Nation. In June 2019, the producers stated that the script took place twenty-five to thirty years after the first film. The plot was reported to center around Lucius. In April 2021, Chris Hemsworth approached Crowe with a proposal to become involved with the project, with the intention to co-produce the film. While working together on the Marvel Cinematic Universe (MCU) film Thor: Love and Thunder (2022), the two actors shared additional ideas for the film.

By September 2021, Scott stated that the script was once again being worked on with his intention being to direct the sequel upon the completion of production on Napoleon (2023). In November, it was revealed that David Scarpa, who worked with Scott on Napoleon, was rewriting the script. Scott stated in a 2023 interview that they had struggled for 10 months to write the script four years previously, until they revisited the idea of Lucius as the "survivor" of the original film. According to Scott, the premise for the sequel began with the emperors Caracalla and Geta. He said, "After Commodus's death, there was a scramble for the chair, and out of that eventually came a man who became the father of the two princes... One of them was just this side of being dysfunctional, a lunatic. The other one tried to control his brother. So that state of constant disagreement and fluctuating personalities was where we began." The film's final credits went to Scarpa for the screenplay from a story by Scarpa and Craig, while off-screen Additional Literary Material credit was given to Franzoni, Krysty Wilson-Cairns, and Jack Thorne.

Originally greenlit with a production budget of $165 million, the cost of the film increased to a reported $310 million by the time filming wrapped, though Paramount insisted the net cost did not exceed $250 million. Additionally, Scott's desire to have a rhino battle in the original film, which went unrealized due to cost, was included in the sequel. November 14, Deadline Hollywood reported the film's net budget to be $210 million. The production received €46.7 million in film incentive rebates from Malta, setting a record for the largest rebate issued for a film production in the European Union.

=== Pre-production ===
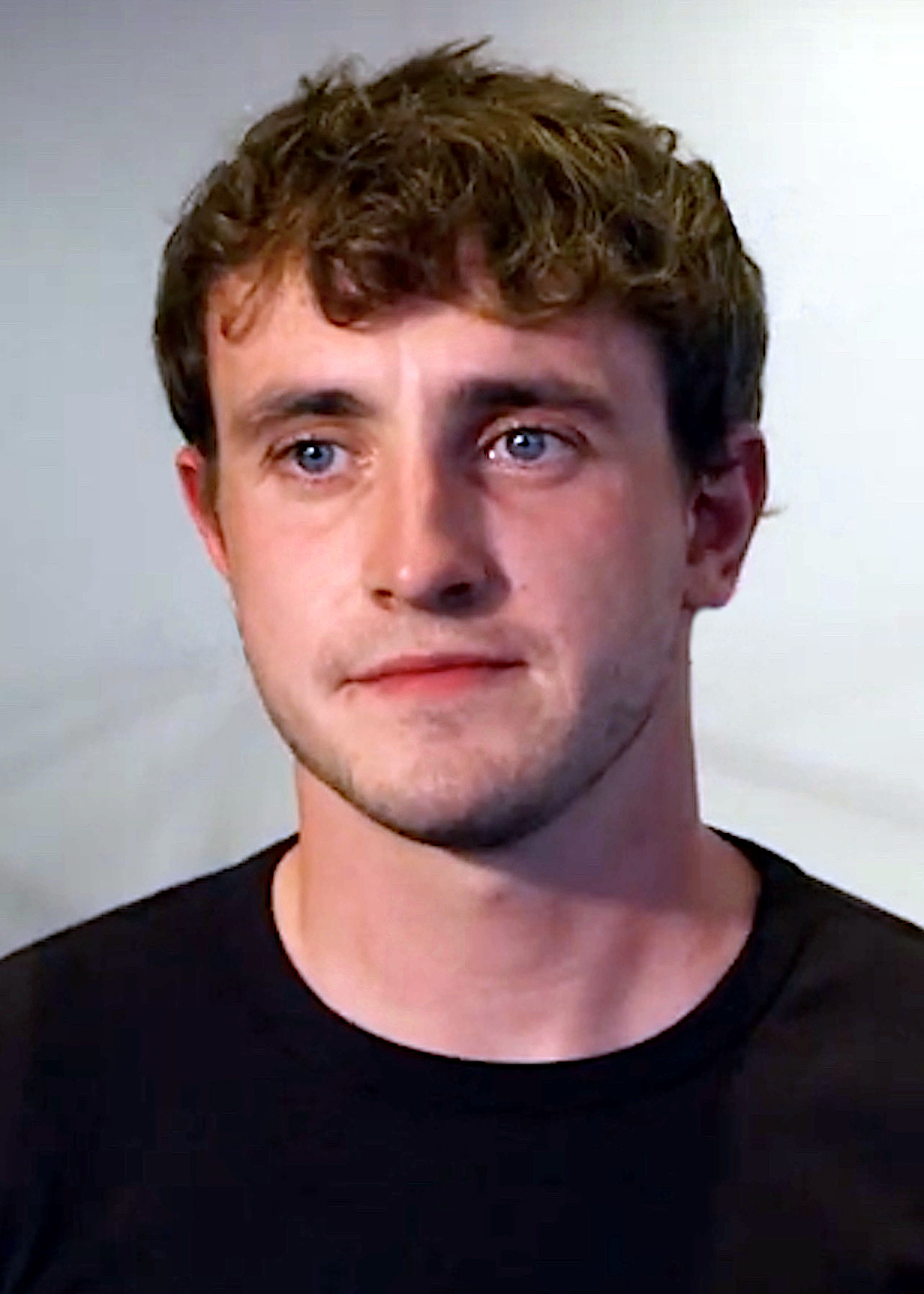
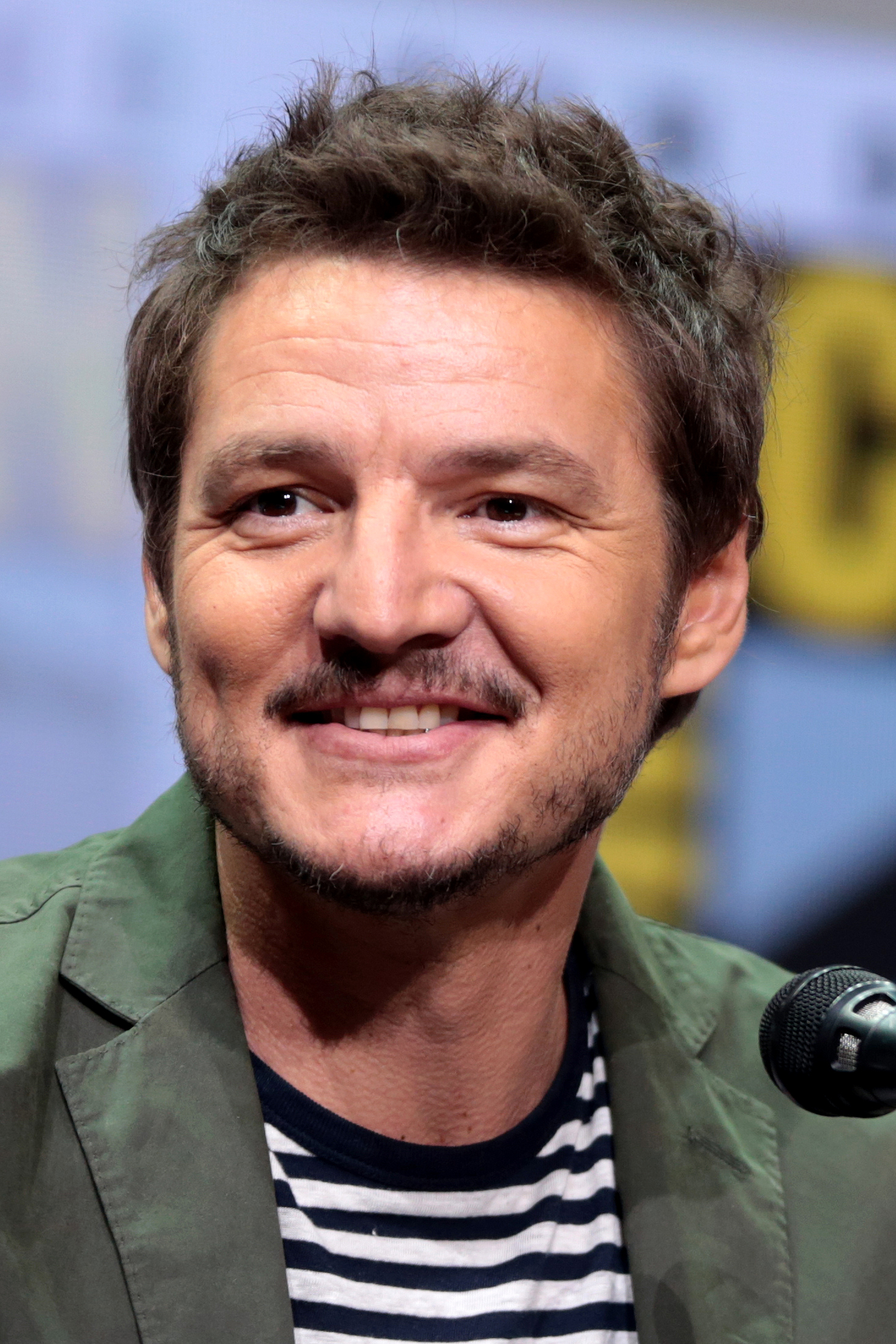
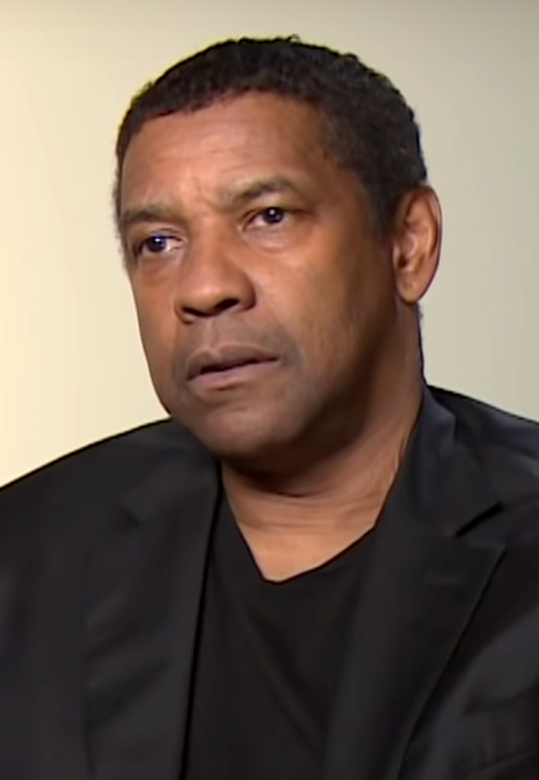
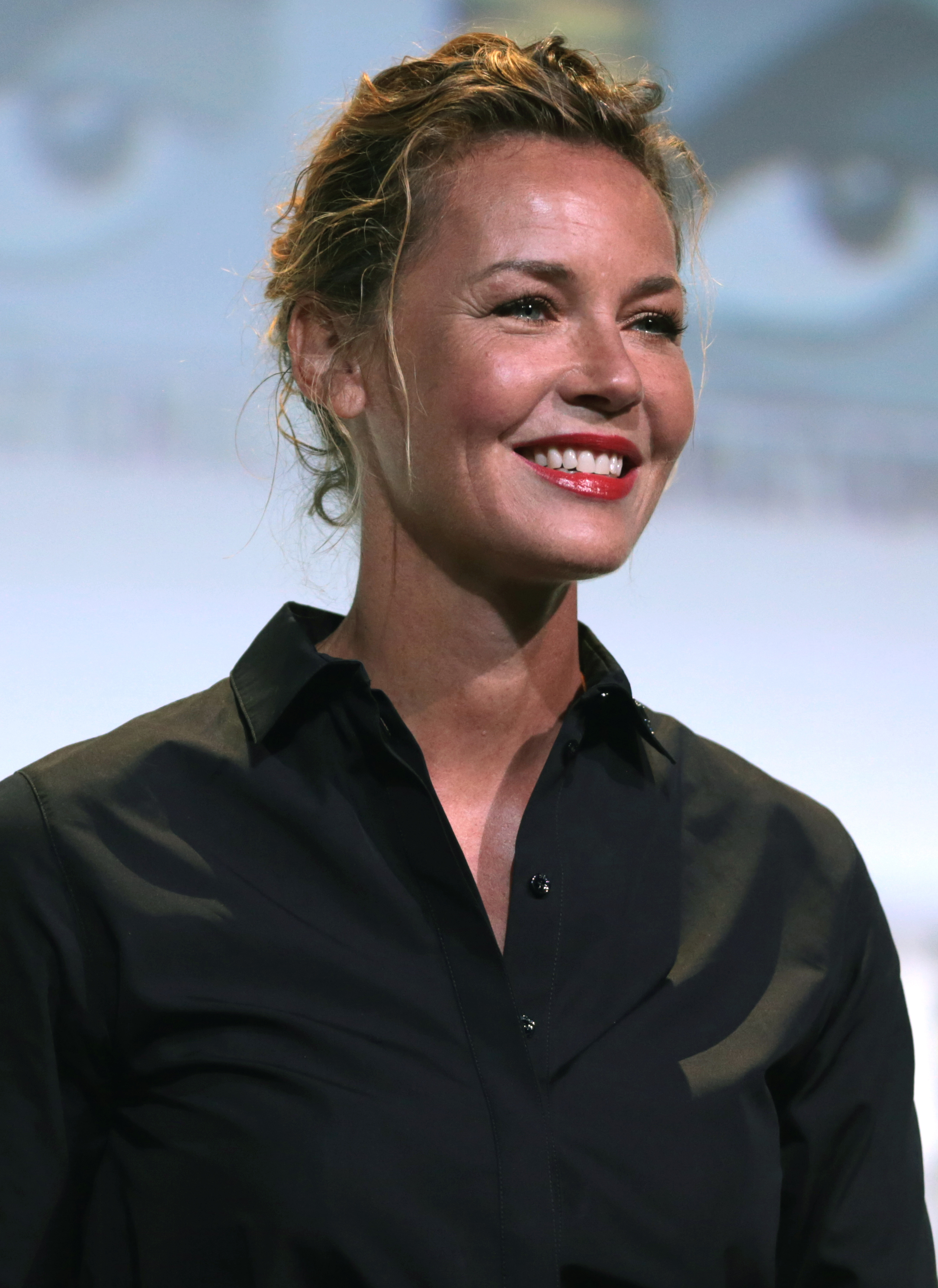
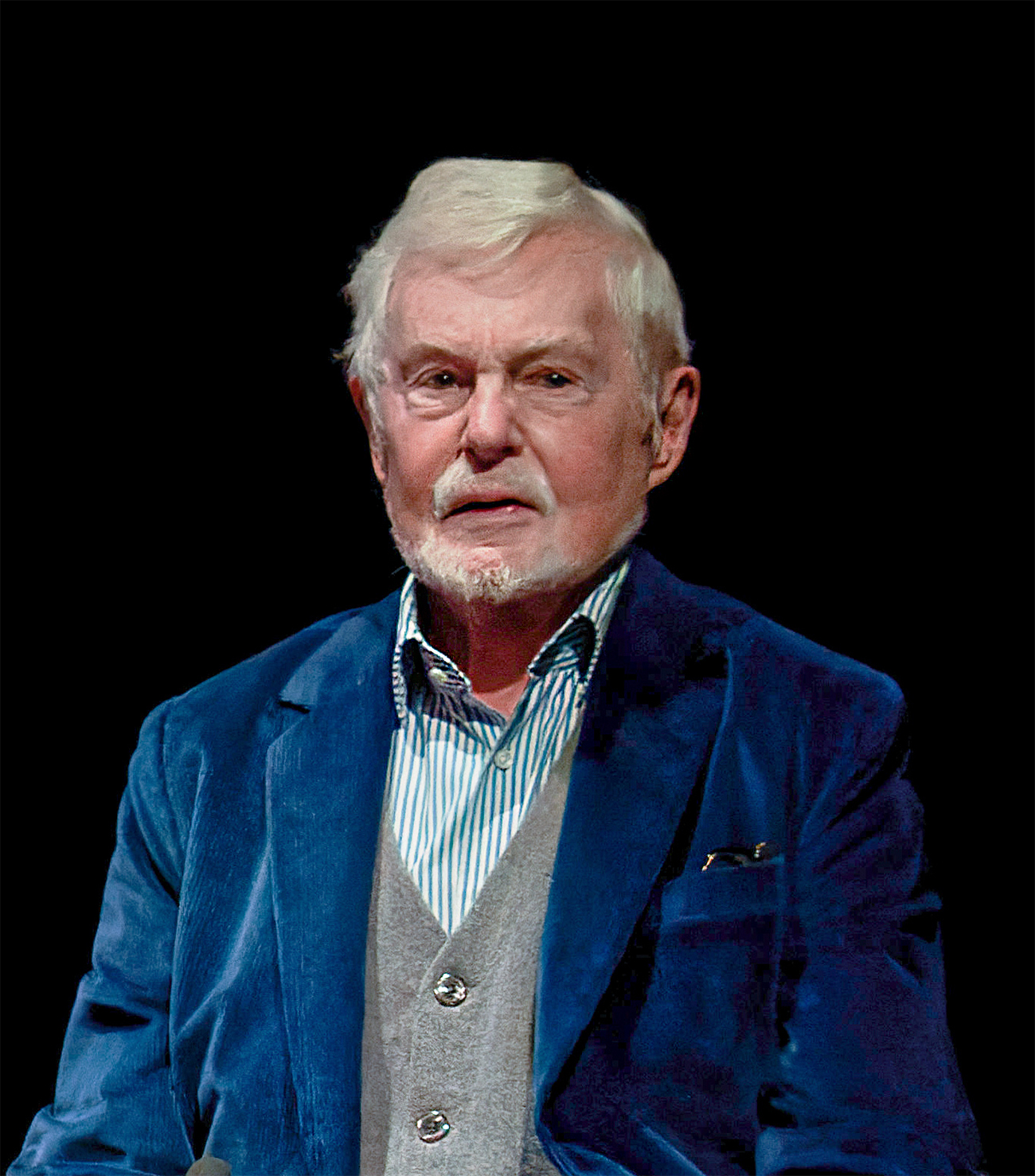
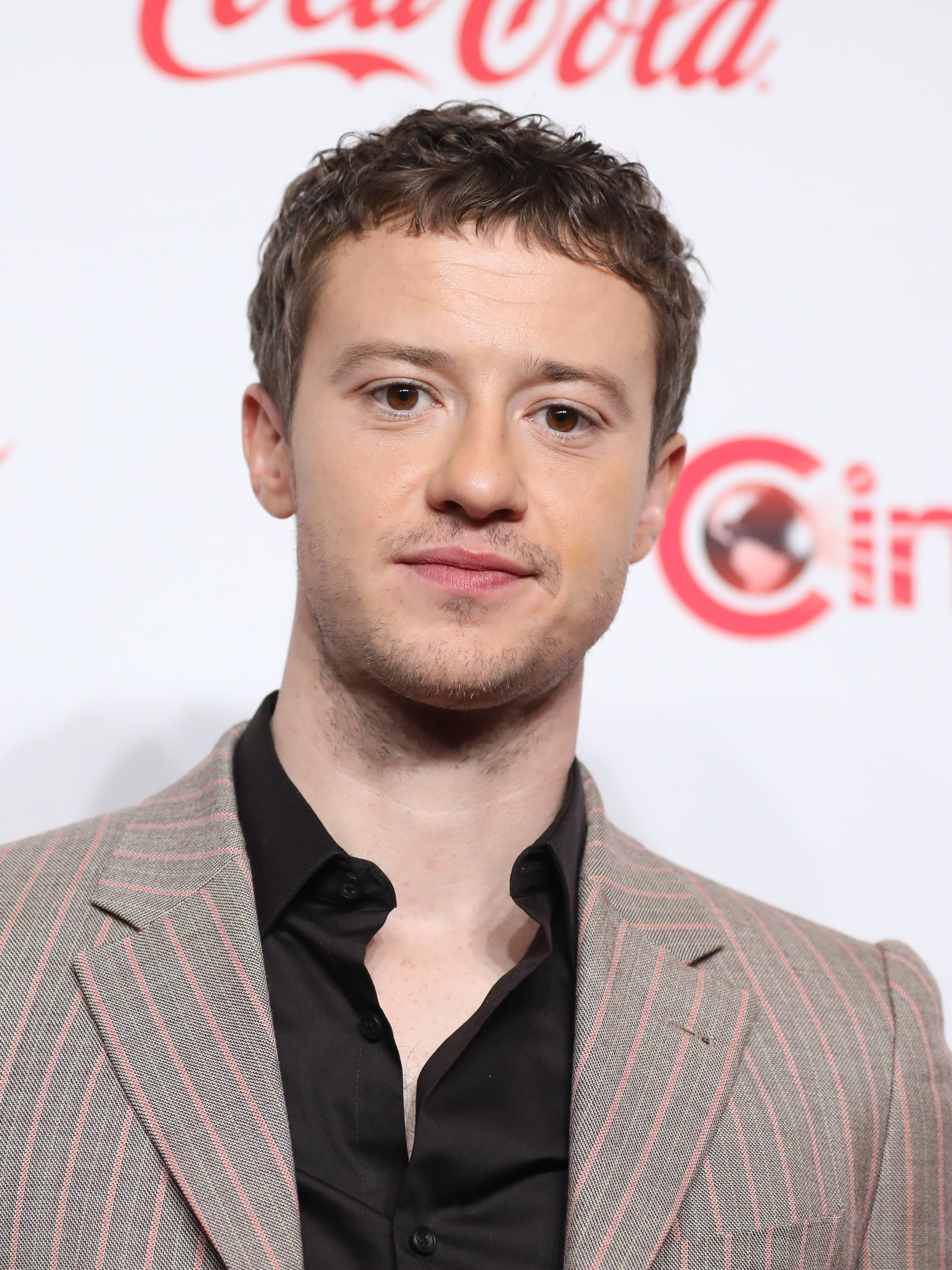
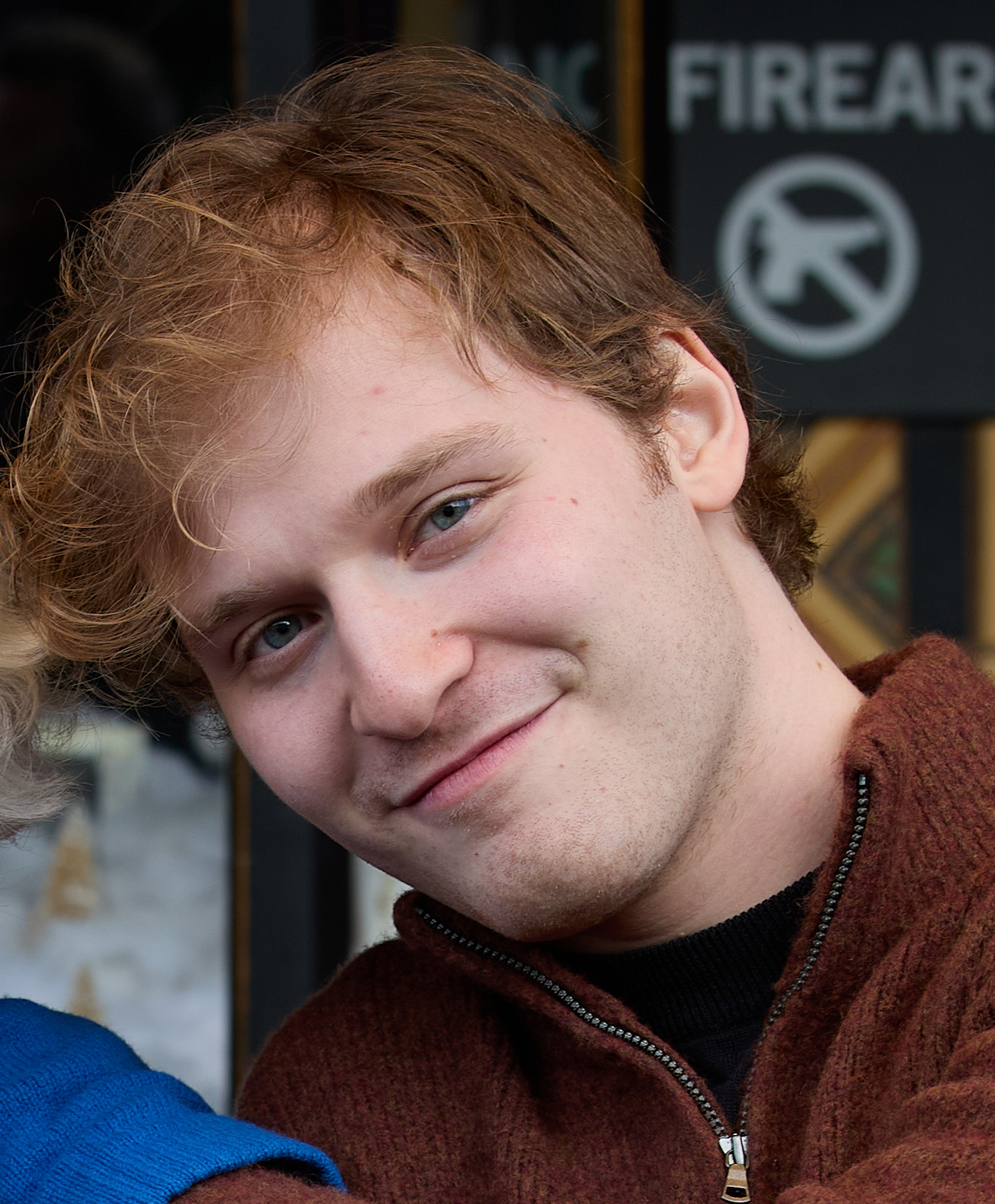
(Clockwise from top left) Gladiator II stars Paul Mescal, Pedro Pascal, Connie Nielsen, Fred Hechinger, Joseph Quinn, Derek Jacobi, and Denzel Washington

In January 2023, Paul Mescal was cast in the film as the adult Lucius (originally portrayed by Spencer Treat Clark), while it was also reported that Arthur Max and Janty Yates, the production designer and costume designer of the original film, respectively, would also be returning to work on the sequel. Scott was unaware of Mescal's fame until he watched his performance in the BBC Three/Hulu miniseries Normal People, which he came across in his need for a "bedtime story". Shortly after, the story for Gladiator II was completed, and Scott ultimately cast Mescal in the lead role after a brief Zoom call. Austin Butler, Richard Madden, Timothée Chalamet and Miles Teller had also been considered for the lead role. Mescal was chosen after Daria Cercek and Michael Ireland had seen his performance in the West End revival of A Streetcar Named Desire, claiming that the "ladies in the audience [had been] very vocal" when he had taken his shirt off. Having seen the original film when he was 13 with his father, Mescal was invited for breakfast by Lucy Fisher and Douglas Wick, who informed him about the sequel's casting, proceeding to tell Scott about his physical capabilities due to playing Gaelic football in his youth while Scott found a striking resemblance to Richard Harris, who played Marcus Aurelius in the original film. Scott opted to cast Mescal despite his newcomer status under the pretext he launched careers likewise for Sigourney Weaver and Brad Pitt when he cast them in his films Alien (1979) and Thelma & Louise (1991) respectively. To prepare for the role, Mescal didn't get in touch with Crowe to avoid audiences potentially thinking the film will define his career, trained physically, ate sweet potato and ground beef to put on 18 pounds of muscle and remembered Roman history he studied at school, in addition to practice fighting choreography, horse training and sword fighting.

In March 2023, Barry Keoghan entered negotiations to join the cast in the role of Emperor Caracalla while Denzel Washington joined the cast. Regarding Scott and his brother Tony as "great filmmakers" who never miss, Washington accepted the role out of interest to work with the inspirational Scott again after their previous collaboration in American Gangster (2007). Additionally, John Mathieson was set to return as cinematographer for the film. Scott did not conceive Macrinus with Washington in mind, but felt inspired to cast him after seeing the Jean-Léon Gérôme painting Moorish Bath, which depicted a black bearded man with a jeweled Dizzy Gillespie-like hat in orange and blue silk, inspiring the character's appearance, plus Washington's status as a method actor. In April 2023, it was announced that Connie Nielsen and Djimon Hounsou would reprise their roles as Lucilla and Juba respectively, while Joseph Quinn was added to the cast as Emperor Geta. In May 2023, Pedro Pascal, May Calamawy, Lior Raz, Derek Jacobi, Peter Mensah and Matt Lucas joined the cast of the film, with Fred Hechinger entering negotiations to play Caracalla after Keoghan had to drop out over scheduling conflicts with Saltburn (2023). Jacobi reprises his role as Senator Gracchus. Similarly to Mescal, Pascal underwent intense gladiator training for his role, which he found challenging, but deemed the experience "the most exciting" of his career due to growing up with Scott's films. In December, Hounsou announced that, despite initially being involved, he would not be returning for the sequel due to scheduling conflicts.

=== Filming ===
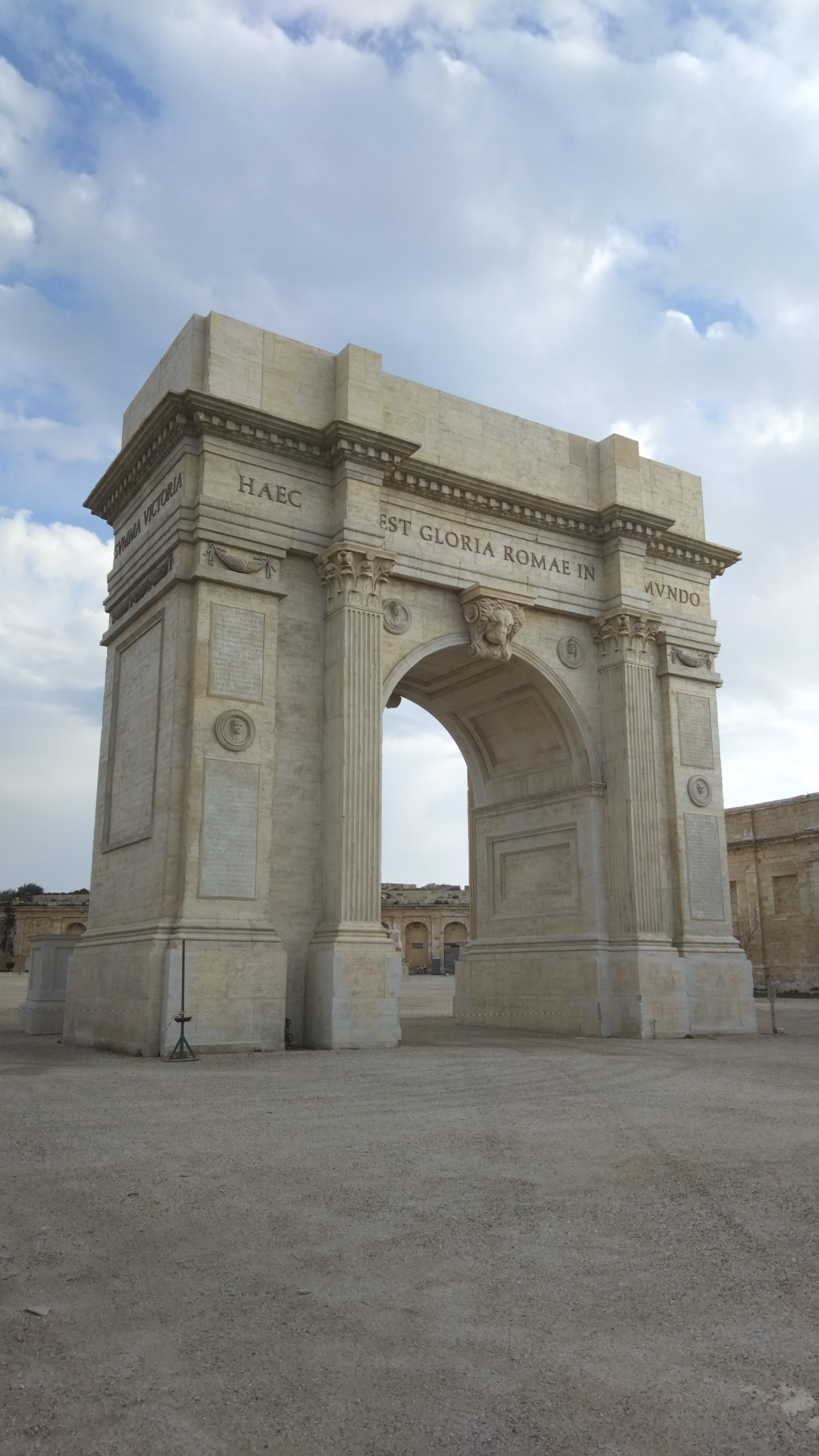
Part of the film were shot at Fort Ricasoli in Malta.

Production was expected to begin in May 2023, with Ouarzazate, Morocco set as a filming location. Set construction began in the city in April. Filming began in June 2023 with additional filming locations planned for Malta, which stood-in for ancient Rome, and the United Kingdom over the following four months, with a few early sequences being shot in Morocco before flying to Malta to shoot the rest of the film. Mescal felt some nerves over shooting in the assembled Colosseum and shooting scenes with Washington. Scott purposely took Mescal to the Colosseum set so he could familiarize himself with it, as Mescal had not done any big studio movies before. An accident involving fire during filming on June 7 injured six crew members. Filming was suspended in July due to the 2023 Hollywood labor disputes. For a fight sequence, a rhinoceros was created via 3D printing controlled by radio remote, but filming the scene took two or three days and affected Mescal's physicality due to the temperature. Filming resumed on December 4 in Malta, and wrapped on January 17, 2024. Filming also took place on the South Downs at Devil's Dyke, Sussex in June 2024.

== Music ==
Harry Gregson-Williams composed the score for the film, taking over from Hans Zimmer and Lisa Gerrard who had scored the first film. Zimmer decided not to return because he did not want to repeat his work from the first film. In an interview with Curzon, he said that the film was "in really good hands" with Gregson-Williams, who had started his career as Zimmer's assistant.

Gregson-Williams wrote 100 minutes of original score for the film, and used some of Zimmer and Gerrard's musical cues from the first film.

== Release ==
=== Theatrical ===
Gladiator II had its world premiere in Sydney on October 30, 2024. It was released more widely in Australia, Italy and New Zealand on November 14. It was released in the United Kingdom and some other territories the following day, and in the United States and Canada on November 22. Universal Pictures declined to co-finance the sequel or distribute it overseas as it had the first film, leaving only Paramount Pictures as the worldwide distributor. It was previously scheduled for a global release on November 22.

On July 1, 2024, it had been announced that the film's release date would be shared with Wicked, whose date was moved from November 27 to avoid competition with Moana 2. This sparked speculation on whether pitting the two films together could lead to a scenario similar to the Barbenheimer phenomenon, which was a result of Barbie and Oppenheimer both being released on July 21, 2023. On July 10, 2024, Mescal called the double release "Glicked" and voiced his support for the two films to be shown as a double feature, saying "It would be amazing 'cause I think the films couldn't be more polar opposites and it worked in that context previously. So, fingers crossed people come out and see both films on opening weekend".

=== Home media ===
Gladiator II was released on digital download on December 24, 2024, and on Ultra HD Blu-ray and Blu-ray Disc on March 4, 2025.

=== Rating ===
Much like the original film, Gladiator II was rated R by the Motion Picture Association due to "strong bloody violence". Unlike other past films of his, Scott stated that Gladiator II will not receive a director's cut, as he earned the right to have final cut and removed some scenes during filming so he did not need to do so after finishing the film.

In Australia, two cuts of the film were released; the original, uncut MA15+ version (with the consumer advice "strong themes and violence"), and the edited M-rated version ("animal cruelty, blood and gore, injury detail and violence") where blood spray is either trimmed down or removed. The MA15+ rating was reinstated for the uncut home media release, with a revised consumer advice of "strong animal cruelty, violence and blood and gore".

=== Marketing ===
Footage of the film screened at the CinemaCon 2024 in Las Vegas included scenes of Joseph Quinn as Geta dressed in a white toga and laurel-leaf crown dramatically plunging his thumb downward to note the fate of defeated gladiators, with Nielsen in the background. In June of that year, Scott showcased an extended clip of the film featuring Denzel Washington, Paul Mescal, Pedro Pascal, Connie Nielsen, and Quinn.

A poster for the film was released on July 8, 2024, with a trailer released the following day. The trailer would also reportedly be attached to the Marvel Cinematic Universe (MCU) film Deadpool & Wolverine, which was released on July 26, 2024. Jennifer Ouellette of Ars Technica said the trailer indicated the film "promises to be just as much of a visual feast, as a new crop of power players (plus a couple of familiar faces) clash over the future of Rome". Rather than using an orchestral score, the first trailer used "No Church in the Wild" by Jay-Z and Kanye West, which caused a backlash among film fans who said it was too modern of a song choice. Some justified this choice of music by citing the trailer for the first Gladiator which had used "Bawitdaba" by Kid Rock. Screen Rant criticized how the second trailer spoiled the plot twist of Maximus being Lucius' father; while a common fan theory since the first film's release, Adam Bentz found it questionable to reveal in a trailer, as it could have been emotionally impactful for audiences like it was for Mescal when he found out his character's relationship with the original's protagonist.

On the first day of the 2024 NFL season, Paramount Pictures and Pepsi announced a campaign cross-promoting the film with the soft drink's sponsorship of the National Football League. A series of advertisements featured football stars Josh Allen, Derrick Henry, Justin Jefferson, and Travis Kelce as "Gridiron Gladiators", with Megan Thee Stallion appearing as Empress Megan.

On October 4, 2024, Japanese professional wrestling promotion New Japan Pro-Wrestling announced that the movie would sponsor that year's King of Pro-Wrestling event on October 14, which is slated to be the first since 2019.

On November 1, 2024, at Lucca Comics & Games 2024, to promote the film in Italian cinemas, Francesco Totti played a Roman centurion. On November 11, 2024, Scuderia Ferrari drivers Charles Leclerc and Carlos Sainz Jr. attended the film's premiere in London as part of a collaboration with Paramount to promote the film, with the film's actors Paul Mescal, Connie Nielsen, and Fred Hechinger joining the team at the 2024 Las Vegas Grand Prix. The film's logo appeared on Ferrari's car for the Grand Prix itself. The London premiere was the first Royal Film Performance during the reign of Charles III.

== Reception ==
=== Box office ===
Gladiator II grossed $172.4 million in the United States and Canada, and $289.7 million in other countries, for a worldwide total of $462.2 million.

In the United States and Canada, Gladiator II was projected to gross $60 million from 3,500 theaters in its opening weekend. It was released alongside Wicked, which was compared to 2023's Barbenheimer due to the films' contrasting target audiences. The film made $22 million on its first day, including $6.5 million from Thursday night previews. It went on to debut to $55.5 million, finishing second behind Wicked. It marked the biggest opening weekend of Denzel Washington's career, surpassing American Gangster ($43.5 million in 2007), and also topped 8 Mile ($51.2 million in 2002) for the best opening for a November R-rated film. In its second weekend the film made $30.7 million (and a total of $44 million over the five day Thanksgiving frame), dropping 44% and finishing third behind Moana 2 and Wicked. In its third weekend the film made $12.5 million, remaining in third place.

The film was released in 63 territories one week ahead of its U.S. release and earned $87 million, the biggest opening weekend of Scott's career. The second weekend had Gladiator II earning $106 million worldwide to finish second behind Wicked, with its $50.5 million internationally being slightly higher than the $50.2 million of its competitor.

In late 2026, Matthew Belloni from Puck News reported the rumor that Scott "blamed Mescal for the film's underperformance due to not being "masculine enough" in the title role", hence why he replaced Mescal with Jacob Elordi as Hig in The Dog Stars (2026). However, representatives for Scott strongly denied the claims in a statement to Entertainment Weekly, calling the rumors completely untrue and clarifying that Scott highly valued his collaboration with Mescal and was eager to work with him again. The spokesperson affirmed that Mescal's departure from The Dog Stars was strictly due to a scheduling conflict with his rehearsal commitments for Sam Mendes' forthcoming four-part Beatles biopic series, in which Mescal is set to portray Paul McCartney.

=== Critical response ===
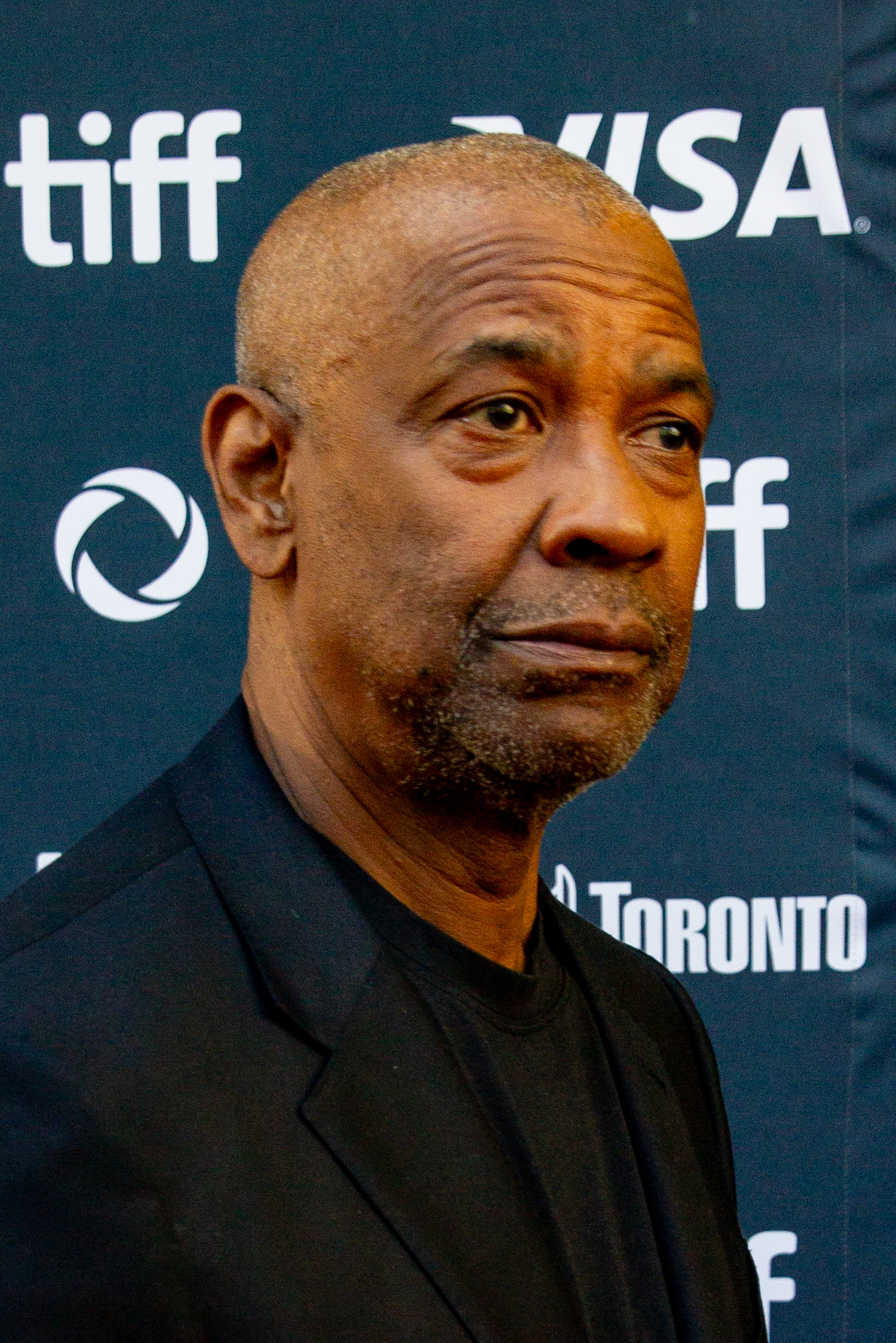
Washington was singled out and praised by critics.

On the review aggregator website Rotten Tomatoes, 70% of 406 critics' reviews are positive, with an average rating of 6.6/10. The website's consensus reads: "Echoing its predecessor while upping the bloodsport and camp, Gladiator II is an action extravaganza that derives much of its strength and honor from Denzel Washington's scene-stealing performance." Metacritic, which uses a weighted average, assigned the film a score of 64 out of 100, based on 62 critics, indicating "generally favorable" reviews. Audiences polled by CinemaScore gave the film an average grade of "B" on an A+ to F scale (down from the first film's A), while those surveyed by PostTrak gave it a 77% overall positive score, with 64% saying they would "definitely recommend" it.

Christopher Campbell at Rotten Tomatoes summarized the reviews as having praised the action, performances, story, and visuals, and said some argued that "plot-wise it's actually too similar to its predecessor". Nick Hyman at Metacritic stated that "most critics also feel that the film lives in the shadow of the more emotional and ultimately superior original." Early reactions from the film's first screening at Paramount Studios in Los Angeles on October 18, 2024, were positive. Critics praised Scott's direction, the set pieces, battle sequences and Mescal's and Washington's performances, mentioning that Scott and Washington could be nominated for the Academy Awards, but a few felt the film lacked an "emotional punch" when compared to the original film. Film critic Scott Menzel deemed the film Scott's best since The Martian (2015), a "big, bloody and bad ass action spectacle" that builds upon the original film's legacy.

Filmmakers Christopher Nolan and Hannah Fidell named it among their favorite films of 2024.

Peter Gillibrand and Naomi Clarke of the BBC recount that Russell Crowe "criticised the creators of the Gladiator sequel for not understanding 'what made the first one special'[; Crowe said that] there was a 'daily fight ... to keep that moral core of the character' when ... filming the original. 'The amount of times they suggested sex scenes ... for Maximus – it's like "you're taking away his power",' he said. He also questioned the idea that Maximus had a relationship with ... Lucilla, describing it as 'crazy.' Russell also revealed people had come up to him in restaurants in Europe to complain after the sequel came out, to which he would say: 'It wasn't me, I didn't do it'."

=== Historical inaccuracy ===
Some inaccuracies include the siege of a Numidian city by Roman triremes and the presence of sharks in a naumachia. Numidia had already been part of the Roman Empire for about 250 years during the reign of Caracalla. University of Chicago historian Shadi Bartsch described the film as "total Hollywood bullshit". At the same time, baboons and a rhinoceros showcased on the Colosseum's arena are historically attested, although there is no record of gladiators riding a rhinoceros.

There could be no naval battles in the Colosseum during the time of Caracalla since the underground structures were equipped for staging traditional gladiatorial fights and wild animals hunting games. The complex housed machinery such as winches and lifts and as a result naval games would have been impossible. Scholar Ray Laurence noted that "the ancient admiration of those who defy death as gladiators is nicely set out by the film" and that "the culture of gladiators is well presented with a doctor of gladiators".

The casting of Denzel Washington as Macrinus generated discussion regarding historical accuracy. The historical Macrinus was born into an equestrian class Berber family in Mauretania Caesariensis, North Africa, and historical records indicate he was a praetorian prefect who dealt with military and legal affairs, rather than a former gladiator owner as depicted in the film. The depiction led to criticism in North Africa, particularly among commentators and audiences in Algeria, who accused the production of "blackwashing" and argued that portraying the Berber emperor as a Black sub-Saharan African inaccurately erased North African identity. In response, Washington acknowledged that the historical Macrinus was not Black, but noted the historical presence of various African and diverse populations within the Roman Empire during that era. The film also attracted attention for Washington's New York accent, with some social media reactions criticizing the perceived historical inauthenticity and use of modern American speech patterns in a film set in ancient Rome. Jermaine Bryant, a Roman historian and PhD candidate in Classics at Princeton University, suggested that the filmmakers’ decision to give Washington's character a New York accent could reflect a willingness by Hollywood to challenge the longstanding trope of portraying Romans with British accents and the broader British coding traditionally associated with Roman characters.

The emperors Caracalla and Geta were not twins—Caracalla was about one year older than Geta. They became the joint emperors in 211 on the death of their father, Lucius Septimius Severus (emperor from 193 to 211). They hated each other and barely spoke with each other from at least the time of their father's death. The two were not at all on friendly terms as depicted in the film. Within a year of their becoming co-emperors, Caracalla murdered Geta. Macrinus was not involved in this.

Caracalla went on as emperor until 217 when he was murdered in Syria by one Justin Martialis, a disgruntled soldier, possibly in a conspiracy arranged by Macrinus. Shortly afterwards Macrinus declared himself emperor and his young son Diadumenianus (who is not depicted in the film) a co-emperor. Both Macrinus and his son were killed in Asia Minor (not in the outskirts of Rome as in the film) in 218 in their struggle to stay in power against the challenge from Elagabalus, a Syrian-born high-priest of a local Syrian sun god of the same name, who then became emperor. The film depicts Macrinus as being killed by the young Lucius Verus, the son of Lucilla, daughter of Marcus Aurelius. But this is not possible. The real-life Lucilla was the wife of Lucius Verus, co-emperor with Marcus Aurelius, his adoptive brother. She was born in 148 or 150, so by the time Severus died, she would have been 61 or 63 years old, much older than she is depicted in the film. One of her sons with Lucius Verus was also named Lucius Verus, as in the film. Lucilla had actually died some 20 years before the reign of Caracalla, being murdered on the orders of her brother, the then Emperor Commodus; her son Lucius had died in childhood.

Caracalla, after becoming sole emperor, naming his pet as consul was possibly inspired by the earlier Roman emperor Caligula, who according to Suetonius intended to name his horse Incitatus as consul.

An idea that is presented in both Gladiator films is the branding of gladiators. This myth comes from an incorrect interpretation of the sacramentum of gladiators, which when translated into English means "I swear to let myself be burned" (bonded, punished, and killed with fire). The way this should be interpreted is more of a reference to combat than an actual mark that would identify you as a gladiator. However, this practice of marking did happen but only to slaves attempting to escape from their masters. Slaves running away from their masters were considered robbers because Romans believed when a slave tried running away from his master, he was "stealing himself" from his owner, so they would mark him so people would know he is a slave if he tried to run away again.

There is no historical record of a Roman general named Acacius. The Roman co-emperors Caracalla and Geta were of mixed Arab, Italic, Libyan and Punic descent, but the actors who played them are not.

=== Accolades ===
Award/Festival	Date of ceremony	Category	Recipient(s)	Result	Ref.
Hollywood Music in Media Awards	November 20, 2024	Original Score – Feature Film	Harry Gregson-Williams	Nominated	
Camerimage	November 23, 2024	Golden Frog	John Mathieson	Nominated	
National Board of Review Awards	December 4, 2024	Top Ten Films	Gladiator II	Won	
Astra Creative Arts Awards	December 8, 2024	Best Costume Design	Janty Yates and Dave Crossman	Nominated	
Astra Creative Arts Awards	December 8, 2024	Best Marketing Campaign	Paramount Pictures	Nominated	
Astra Creative Arts Awards	December 8, 2024	Best Production Design	Arthur Max, Jille Azis, and Elli Griff	Nominated	
Astra Creative Arts Awards	December 8, 2024	Best Sound	Gladiator II	Nominated	
Astra Creative Arts Awards	December 8, 2024	Best Visual Effects	Gladiator II	Nominated	
Astra Creative Arts Awards	December 8, 2024	Best Stunts	Gladiator II	Nominated	
Astra Creative Arts Awards	December 8, 2024	Best Stunt Coordinator	Nicola Berwick	Nominated	
Astra Film Awards	December 8, 2024	Best Supporting Actor	Denzel Washington	Nominated	
Astra Film Awards	December 8, 2024	Best Cast Ensemble	Gladiator II	Nominated	
San Diego Film Critics Society	December 9, 2024	Best Stunt Choreography	Gladiator II	Nominated	
San Diego Film Critics Society	December 9, 2024	Best Supporting Actor	Denzel Washington	Runner-up	
Seattle Film Critics Society	December 16, 2024	Villain of the Year	Denzel Washington	Nominated	
Dallas–Fort Worth Film Critics Association	December 18, 2024	Best Supporting Actor	Denzel Washington	Nominated	
Florida Film Critics Circle	December 20, 2024	Best Supporting Actor	Denzel Washington	Nominated	
Golden Globe Awards	January 5, 2025	Best Supporting Actor – Motion Picture	Denzel Washington	Nominated	
Golden Globe Awards	January 5, 2025	Cinematic and Box Office Achievement	Gladiator II	Nominated	
AARP Movies for Grownups Awards	January 11, 2025	Best Picture	Gladiator II	Nominated	
AARP Movies for Grownups Awards	January 11, 2025	Best Director	Ridley Scott	Nominated	
AARP Movies for Grownups Awards	January 11, 2025	Best Supporting Actor	Denzel Washington	Nominated	
AARP Movies for Grownups Awards	January 11, 2025	Best Supporting Actress	Connie Nielsen	Nominated	
Satellite Awards	January 26, 2025	Best Actor in a Supporting Role	Denzel Washington	Nominated	
Satellite Awards	January 26, 2025	Best Cinematography	John Mathieson	Nominated	
Satellite Awards	January 26, 2025	Best Editing	Sam Restivo and Claire Simpson	Nominated	
Satellite Awards	January 26, 2025	Best Costume Design	Janty Yates and Dave Crossman	Nominated	
Satellite Awards	January 26, 2025	Best Art Direction and Production Design	Arthur Max, Jille Azis, and Elli Griff	Won	
Satellite Awards	January 26, 2025	Best Sound	Stéphane Bucher, Matthew Collinge, Paul Massey, and Danny Sheehan	Nominated	
Satellite Awards	January 26, 2025	Best Visual Effects	Mark Bakowski, Neil Corbould, Nikki Penny, and Pietro Ponti	Won	
Set Decorators Society of America Awards	February 2, 2025	Best Achievement in Decor/Design of a Period Feature Film	Arthur Max, Jille Azis, and Elli Griff	Nominated	
Costume Designers Guild	February 6, 2025	Excellence in Period Film	Janty Yates and Dave Crossman	Nominated	
AACTA International Awards	February 7, 2025	Best Supporting Actor	Denzel Washington	Nominated	
Critics' Choice Movie Awards	February 7, 2025	Best Supporting Actor	Denzel Washington	Nominated	
Critics' Choice Movie Awards	February 7, 2025	Best Costume Design	Janty Yates and Dave Crossman	Nominated	
Critics' Choice Movie Awards	February 7, 2025	Best Production Design	Arthur Max, Jille Azis, and Elli Griff	Nominated	
Critics' Choice Movie Awards	February 7, 2025	Best Visual Effects	Mark Bakowski, Pietro Ponti, Nikki Penny, and Neil Corbould	Nominated	
Annie Awards	February 8, 2025	Outstanding Achievement for Character Animation in a Live Action Production	Kyle Dunlevy, Philipp Winterstein, Gil Daniel, Michael Elder, and Julien Bagory	Nominated	
Visual Effects Society Awards	February 11, 2025	Outstanding Created Environment in a Photoreal Feature	Oliver Kane, Stefano Farci, John Seru, Frederick Vallee (for "Rome")	Nominated	
Visual Effects Society Awards	February 11, 2025	Outstanding Model in a Photoreal or Animated Project	Oliver Kane, Marnie Pitts, Charlotte Fargier, Laurie Priest (for "Colosseum")	Nominated	
Artios Awards	February 12, 2025	Outstanding Achievement in Casting – Big Budget Feature (Drama)	Kate Rhodes James	Nominated	
IFTA Film & Drama Awards	February 14, 2025	Best Lead Actor – Film	Paul Mescal	Nominated	
IFTA Film & Drama Awards	February 14, 2025	Best International Actor	Denzel Washington	Nominated	
Make-Up Artists & Hair Stylists Guild	February 15, 2025	Best Period and/or Character Make-Up in a Feature-Length Motion Picture	Jana Carboni, Charlie Hounslow, Maria Solberg Lepre, Lauren Baldwin, Chantal Busuttil	Nominated	
Make-Up Artists & Hair Stylists Guild	February 15, 2025	Best Period and/or Character Hair Styling in a Feature-Length Motion Picture	Giuliano Mariano, Kerstin Weller, Romina Ronzani, Nicola Mariano, Marcelle Genovese	Nominated	
British Academy Film Awards	February 16, 2025	Outstanding British Film	Ridley Scott, Douglas Wick, Lucy Fisher, Michael Pruss, David Scarpa, Peter Craig	Nominated	
British Academy Film Awards	February 16, 2025	Best Sound	Stéphane Bucher, Matthew Collinge, Paul Massey, Danny Sheehan	Nominated	
British Academy Film Awards	February 16, 2025	Best Special Visual Effects	Mark Bakowski, Neil Corbould, Nikki Penny, Pietro Ponti	Nominated	
Black Reel Awards	February 17, 2025	Outstanding Supporting Performance	Denzel Washington	Nominated	
Cinema Audio Society Awards	February 22, 2025	Outstanding Achievement in Sound Mixing for a Motion Picture – Live Action	Stephane Bucher, Paul Massey, Matthew Collinge, Alan Meyerson, Filipe Pereira, and Rob Weatherall	Nominated	
Screen Actors Guild Awards	February 23, 2025	Outstanding Performance by a Stunt Ensemble in a Motion Picture	Gladiator II	Nominated	
Toronto Film Critics Association	February 24, 2025	Outstanding Supporting Performance	Denzel Washington	Nominated	
Academy Awards	March 2, 2025	Best Costume Design	Janty Yates and Dave Crossman	Nominated	

== Sequel ==
In September 2024, Scott said that he was developing a script for a third film, but that it would depend on the reception for the second installment. Titled Gladiator III, the plot was stated to follow the continuing adventures of Lucius Verus. Likening the ending of Gladiator II to The Godfather Part II (1974), the filmmaker stated that the next movie would explore the character's realization that he was now tasked with a continuing reputation that he does not want. Scott later stated that the movie is in early stages of development and intended to be the next project he works on, though the following month he told The New York Times his next projects after Gladiator II would be a Bee Gees biopic, set to shoot in September 2025, and an adaptation of the science fiction novel The Dog Stars, set to shoot in Italy in April 2025. In August 2025, Scott revealed that the film "is in process right now".
