= The Dog Stars (film) =

2026 film by Ridley Scott

- Theatrical release poster
- Directed by: Ridley Scott
- Screenplay by: Mark L. Smith
- Based on: The Dog Stars by Peter Heller
- Produced by: Ridley Scott; Michael Pruss; Mark L. Smith; Cliff Roberts
- Starring: Jacob Elordi; Josh Brolin; Margaret Qualley; Guy Pearce
- Cinematography: Erik Messerschmidt
- Edited by: Sam Restivo; Claire Simpson
- Music by: Harry Gregson-Williams
- Production companies: 20th Century Studios; Scott Free Productions
- Distributed by: 20th Century Studios
- Release dates: August 20, 2026 (Odeon Luxe Leicester Square, premiere); August 28, 2026 (United States and United Kingdom)
- Running time: 118 minutes
- Countries: United States; United Kingdom
- Language: English
- Budget: $70–110 million
- Box office: $39 million

The Dog Stars is a 2026 post-apocalyptic action thriller film directed and produced by Ridley Scott, from a screenplay by Mark L. Smith, based on the 2012 novel by Peter Heller. The film stars Jacob Elordi, Josh Brolin, Margaret Qualley, and Guy Pearce, and follows the survivors of a global flu pandemic in rural Colorado.

The Dog Stars premiered at the Odeon Luxe Leicester Square on August 20, 2026, and was released in the United States by 20th Century Studios on August 28. The film received mixed reviews from critics, and was a box-office bomb, grossing only $39 million against a production budget of $70–110 million.

== Plot ==
A Cessna A185E Skywagon "tail-dragger", the type of plane Hig flies in the movie. (In the original novel he flies a 1956 Cessna 182 with tricycle landing gear.)

In 2035, many years after a devastating flu pandemic almost eradicated humanity, Hig, a former mechanic, lives in Erie, Colorado, with a dog named Jasper, and Bangley, a former Marine turned survivalist. Hig occasionally pilots a small propeller plane into a depopulated Denver to gather supplies of fuel and food. To Bangley's chagrin, Hig also supplies a nearby Mennonite community with food and occasional mechanical repairs.

When two teenage strangers approach, Bangley shoots them dead from his distance look-out point, creating a conflict with the more sympathetic Hig. While flying his propeller plane, Hig picks up a radio signal originating from Grand Junction, Colorado, that suggests human life there. He has picked up this signal multiple times throughout the years since the pandemic, but always quickly lost contact.

While sleeping outside one day, Hig and Jasper encounter a large group trying to ambush their home. The two fight them off until Bangley appears to help them; Jasper is killed.

Heartbroken, Hig decides he must find the source of the Grand Junction radio signal. Bangley, who does not approve of the journey, stays behind in Erie. After experiencing a mechanical failure, Hig lands in a valley where a father and daughter, Pops and Cima, live. The two form an uneasy alliance with Hig, as he repairs his plane and cuts down trees to make a runway. Hig starts a romantic relationship with Cima, who asks him to stay with them.

After their farm is raided in an attack, Hig, Cima, and Pops flee on Hig's plane. They make it to Grand Junction Regional Airport, where the radio operator hesitantly allows them to land and enter their community unarmed. Theirs is the first to arrive in two years.

Upon arrival, the three are uneasy. Darlene, a former flight attendant who is the leader of the community, orders Cima to marry a soldier, due to her previous medical education. As Hig, Cima and Pops escape the airport, they discover the community's cannibalism. As they fly away, they bomb the Grand Junction airport terminal with grenades from the air.

The three fly back to Erie to check on Bangley, where they discover a major attack occurred at the airfield. Bangley managed to take out the over 30 attackers. He is injured but alive, so reluctantly comes with them to the Mennonite community to join a established new settlement there.

== Cast ==
- Jacob Elordi as Hig, a civilian pilot living with his dog
- Josh Brolin as Bangley, an aloof, gun-toting former Marine and Hig's companion
- Margaret Qualley as Cima, a young medic and Hig's love interest
- Guy Pearce as Jack / "Pops", Cima's father
- Allison Janney as Darlene, a former stewardess running a reconverted airport
- Benedict Wong as Aaron, the leader of a Mennonite group in the mountains
- Ewen Bremner as the Crossbow Hunter
- Sam Spruell as John
- Sai Bennett as Melissa

== Production ==
=== Development ===
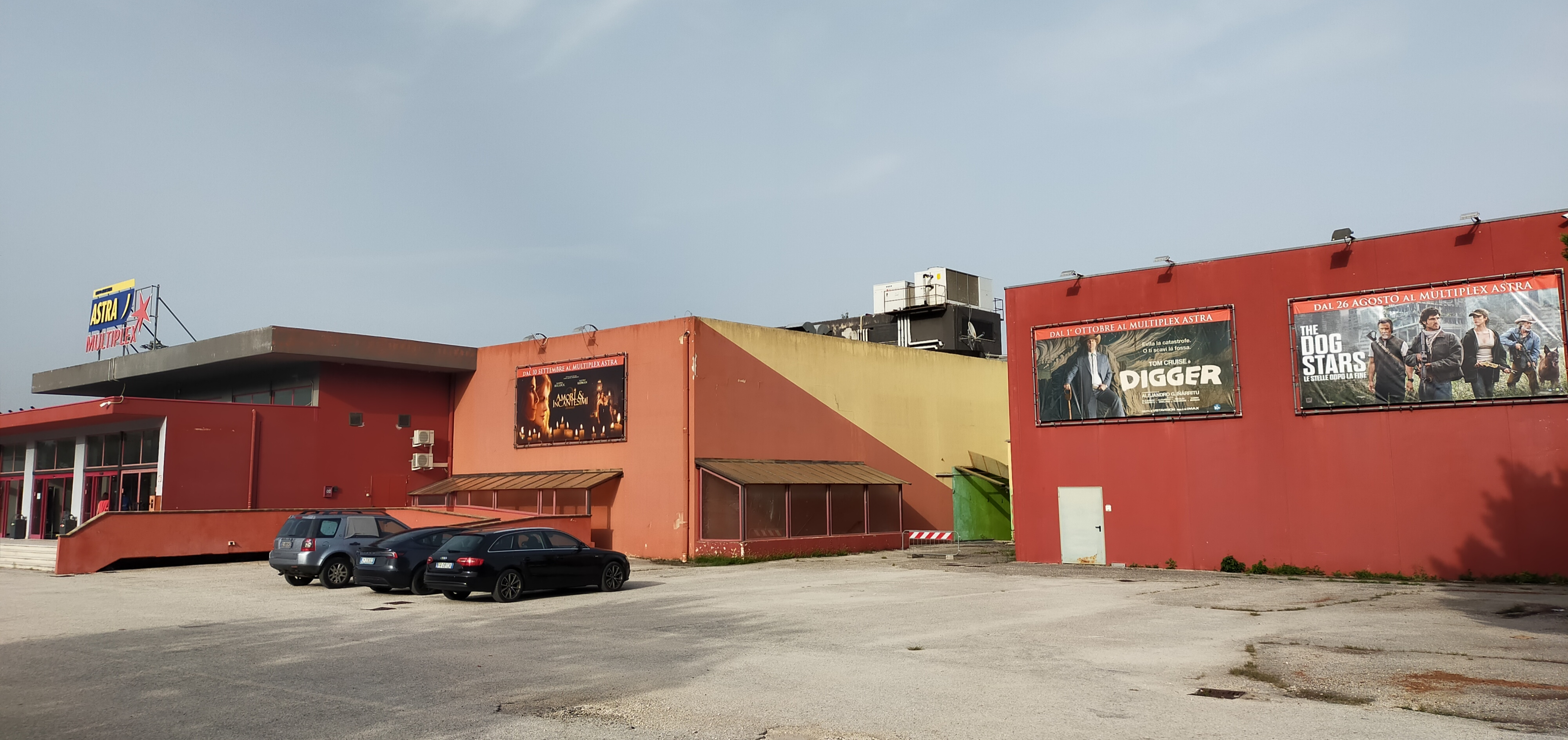
The Dog Stars movie poster in Italy

In November 2024, Ridley Scott stated that after shooting his planned Bee Gees biopic, he wanted to direct a then-unrevealed sci-fi film, adding that "it's already written". This project was later revealed to be based on Peter Heller's 2012 novel The Dog Stars, adapted by Mark L. Smith and Christopher Wilkinson; only Smith received final credit for the screenplay. By this time, it was set to be Scott's next film, with filming set to begin in spring 2025.

=== Casting ===
In November 2024, it was announced that Paul Mescal was in advanced negotiations to star in the film. However, due to scheduling conflicts with Sam Mendes' four-part Beatles biopic series, Mescal exited the project and was replaced by Jacob Elordi in January 2025. Reports later surfaced from Matthew Belloni of Puck News alleging that Scott replaced Mescal over dissatisfaction with his performance in Gladiator II (2024). A representative for Scott firmly denied the claims, calling them "not true" and clarifying that Mescal's departure was strictly due to rehearsal scheduling constraints, adding that Scott maintained a great working relationship with Mescal and was eager to work with him again. In February, Margaret Qualley, Josh Brolin, and Guy Pearce were in final negotiations to join the cast. In early May 2025, Benedict Wong joined the cast.

=== Filming ===
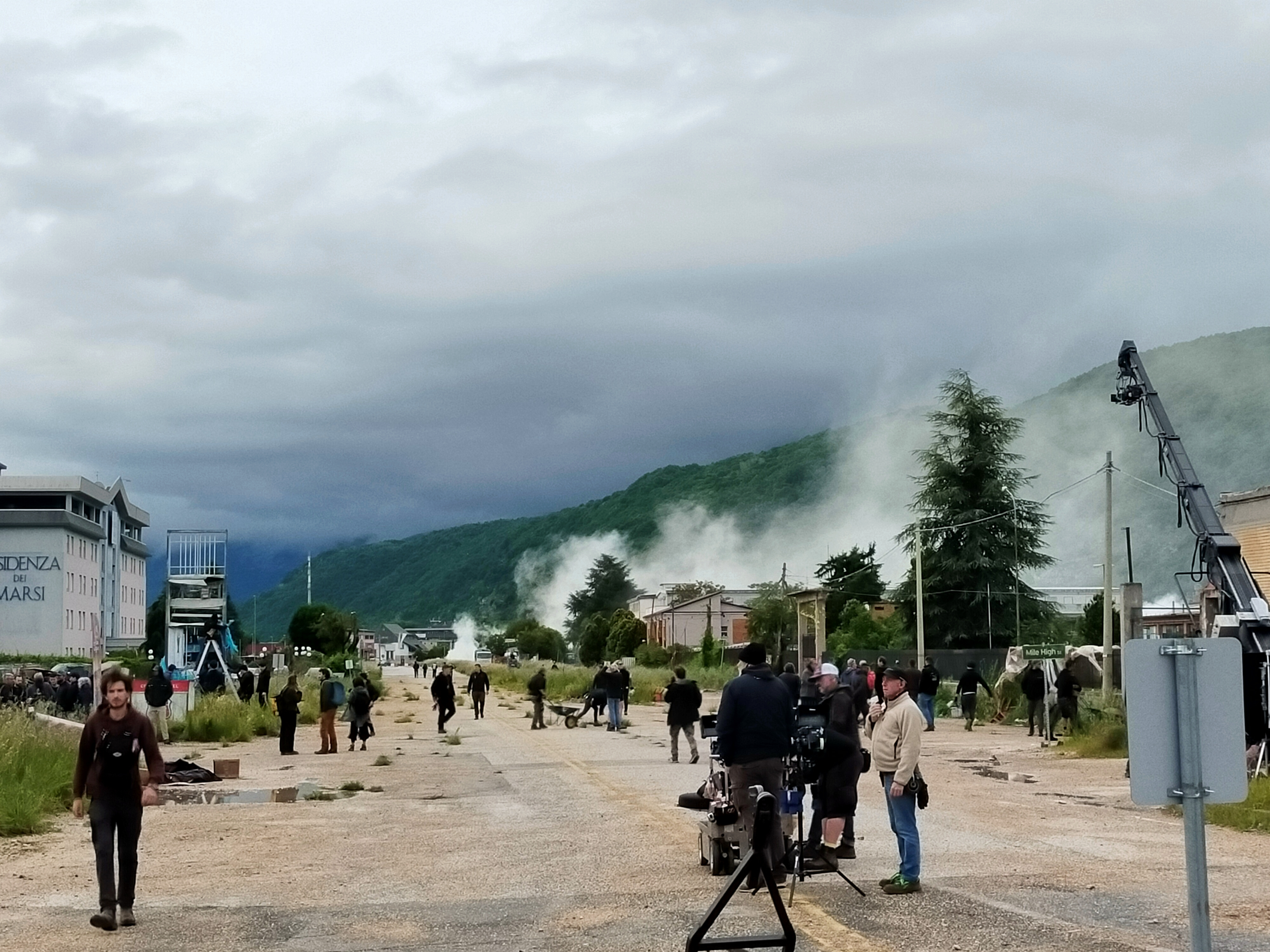
Film set preparation in Avezzano, Italy, in May 2025

Principal photography began in Bordano, Italy, in April 2025. From May 12 to 16, filming took place in Cansiglio, a plateau in the Alpine foothills. Later that month, filming took place in Avezzano, Ovindoli and L'Aquila–Preturo Airport in Abruzzo. In June, production moved to Rome, where filming took place at Cinecittà Studios and in Casal Bernocchi and the EUR. Production concluded in late June 2025 after one-month filming in the natural landscape of Bosco Macchia Grande in Manziana, near Rome. Scenes were also shot at Pinewood Studios.

== Release ==
=== Theatrical ===
The Dog Stars premiered at the Odeon Luxe Leicester Square in London on August 20, 2026, and was released in the United States on August 28, 2026. The film was previously scheduled for March 27, 2026.

=== Home media ===
The Dog Stars was released for digital download on October 27, and on Ultra HD Blu-ray, Blu-ray, and DVD on December 1.

In the United States, The Dog Stars placed sixth on Fandango at Home's weekly digital sales and rental chart for the week ending November 1, following its premium digital release on October 27. The following week, the film ranked tenth.

== Reception ==
=== Box office ===
As of September 20, 2026, The Dog Stars has grossed $15 million in the United States and Canada, and $24 million in other territories, for a worldwide total of $39 million.

In the United States and Canada, The Dog Stars was released alongside Buddy, Coyote vs. Acme, Legend of the White Dragon and Idiots, and was projected to gross $10–14 million from 3,300 theaters in its opening weekend. The film ended up underperforming, debuting at $8 million.

=== Critical response ===
On the review aggregator website Rotten Tomatoes, 41% of 222 critics' reviews are positive, with an average rating of 5.5/10. The website's consensus reads: "A derivative and drowsy tour through the post-apocalypse, The Dog Stars' lush visuals can't compensate for its listless narrative and underpowered pacing." Metacritic, which uses a weighted average, assigned the film a score of 49 out of 100, based on 46 critics, indicating "mixed or average" reviews. Audiences polled by CinemaScore gave the film an average grade of "C+" on an A+ to F scale.

Robert Daniels of RogerEbert.com gave the film one and a half out of four stars, writing, "It probably takes more effort to make a boring post-apocalyptic survivalist action film than to make a good one. If that's the case, then Ridley Scott must've been working overtime on The Dog Stars." Guy Lodge of Variety wrote, "Somewhat aptly released at the tail end of a long, loud movie summer, this is a surprisingly low-energy, low-incident blockbuster; you'd appreciate its mellow, character-oriented approach if it gave you any real characters to hold onto." David Rooney of The Hollywood Reporter was more positive, writing, "Muted but never dull, The Dog Stars seems unlikely to land near the top of anyone's Ridley Scott rankings. But it's an appealingly mellow watch, even if that might seem antithetical to a post-apocalyptic drama positioned squarely in the shadow of death."
