= Canopus Foundation =

German charitable institution

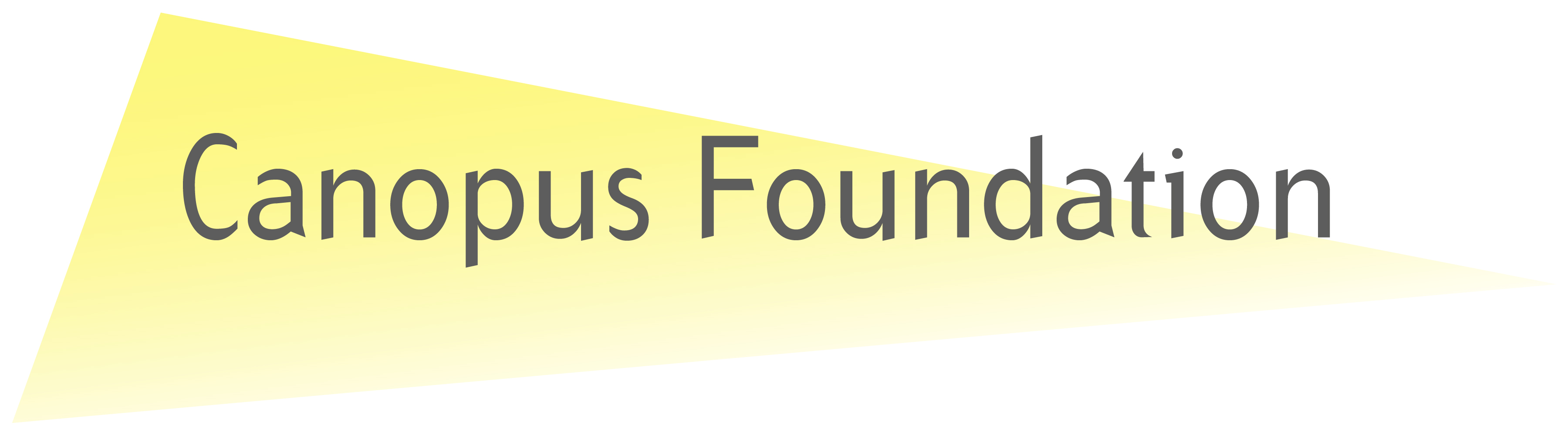
- Type: Private charitable foundation
- Industry: Energy Access for low income Communities, Education and Science for a Sustainable Economy
- Founded: 1997
- Headquarters: Freiburg (Germany)
- Website: www.canopusfund.org

The Canopus Foundation is a registered private charitable institution under German jurisdiction founded in 1997 by Wolfgang Heller and Dr. Peter W. Heller.

== Organization ==
=== Management ===
Executive Director of the foundation is Dr. Peter W. Heller. other Members of the Board of Trustees are Dipl.Vw. Micaela Heller, Julia T. Rahmani, M.Sc.(LSE) and Jakob Heller, B.Sc. (Tübingen).

=== Staff ===
The foundation employs 2 permanent staff and 8 freelancers (status: 2019). Yearly operating expenses are 300.000 Euro.

=== Office ===
The foundation is legally registered in Dreieich, Germany. The office is located in Freiburg im Breisgau, Germany.

== Profile ==
Environmental protection, poverty alleviation, entrepreneurial commitment, education, and science

The Canopus Foundation is a private family foundation registered as a charitable organization under German law. It has been committed to rural electrification by renewable energies in developing countries for over 20 years. Since 2014, Canopus has also been active in the field of education and science for a sustainable economy. Its work is based on the model of “Venture Philanthropy”.

Energy Access for All

1.1 billion people worldwide live without access to energy. Especially in developing and emerging countries the shortage of electrical power supply keeps large parts of the population from overcoming their poverty. In rural areas many qualified skilled workers and small-sized businesses forgo the use of electrical machines. They are limited in the goods they can produce, and denied economic development, and food spoilage from heat because of the lack of refrigeration and conservation. Without energy for the cold storage of medication and vaccines, basic health care is lacking. Without access to a power supply to light their huts and houses, charge batteries, or run electrical devices such as phones, radios, TVs, or fans, rural low income communities have no access for connecting to the “world”, for either taking up employment, or acquiring knowledge. The Canopus Foundation has made it its mission Access to sustainable energy for all people thus giving them new prospects for the future.

2000 - 2020 the Canopus Foundation has been supporting 51 social enterprises and non-profit organizations working in the energy access sector, and organized two international "Solar for All" contests to promote best practice solutions.

Education and Science for a Sustainable Economy

Since 2008 the economic sciences have faced a blatant crisis of legitimacy. Only a limited number of economists predicted the imminent crash of international financial markets, and retrospective analyses of the causes were in part contradictory. Ever since, the image of major economic research institutes has noticeably suffered. This loss of influence in the area of political advice and the additional loss of their legitimacy in the media and civil society has led to a defensive mood on the part of economists, leaving little space for critical self-reflection. Critics of the orthodox school are finding increasing sympathy in the public eye. They focus on the following points of criticism: the abstract model-type worlds of neoclassical equilibrium economics are applied to reality without taking the social environment into account, thus rendering sustainable economics inconceivable. Knowledge in the fields of social science and the humanities including economic history, scientific theory, and ethics turns into a marginal phenomenon of academia. This has led to a growing dysfunctionality where comprehensive interaction and an exchange of opinions would be urgently needed.

Since 2014 the Canopus Foundation has been a shareholder of the Humboldt-Viadrina Governance Platform (HVGP) gGmbH in Berlin; since 2015 it has been supporting the Cusanus University in Bernkastel-Kues, Germany. Both institutions are committed to supporting plural economics in their respective fields, in the organization of events, and in research and teaching.

== Modus operandi ==
As a family foundation Canopus pursues the venture philanthropy model which transfers the method and tools of venture capital to the social sector, responding to its growing demand for advanced financial engineering. The foundation promotes the long term allocation of philanthropic risk capital to early stage social enterprises, laying the ground for financial self-sufficiency and the expansion of their social and ecological impact. Towards this end the Canopus Foundation provides additional technical expertise, management skills and market intelligence where needed. Since 2019 the Canopus Foundation is a member of the Association of German Foundations.

== Cooperating Partners (selected) ==
Ashoka (non-profit organization), Elea Foundation for Ethics in Globalization, Humboldt-Viadrina Governance Platform (HVGP)gGmbH, Cusanus University.

== See also ==
- Renewable energy in developing countries
- Renewable energy in Africa
- Renewable energy in China
- Solar power in South Asia
- Solar powered refrigerator
- SolarAid
