= Claire Simpson =

British film editor

Claire Simpson is a British film editor.

== Career ==
For her work on Oliver Stone's Platoon (1986), she won the Academy Award for Best Film Editing and was nominated for The Constant Gardener (2005), while her work on both films won her the BAFTA Award for Best Editing. She also worked as editor of Stone's Salvador (1986) and Wall Street (1987).

=== Quotes about editing ===
- "I think that editing has...to do with architecture and, having built a house recently, I can honestly say that dealing with the plumbing can be as tantalizing as disguising the mechanics of the plot."
- "Cutting rooms are only dark and gloomy places if you make them so. Hard work, educated taste, sharp instincts, and a flair for the absurd have been essential to my career as an editor as well as important ingredients for my life. And never underestimate the value of good luck. I know many extraordinarily talented people who have not been lucky enough to win an Academy Award. Don't get me wrong, it was remarkably validating to win. But what really counts is to face every working day with the guts to be honest, both with your director and with the material you're working with. If you can't do that, don't take the job."

== Filmography ==
=== Editor ===
| Year | Film | Director | Notes | Ref. |
|---|---|---|---|---|
| 1984 | C.H.U.D. | Douglas Cheek | | |
| 1985 | Soldiers in Hiding | Malcolm Clarke | Second collaboration with Malcolm Clarke | |
| 1986 | Salvador | Oliver Stone | First collaboration with Oliver Stone | |
| 1986 | Platoon | Oliver Stone | Second collaboration with Oliver Stone | |
| 1987 | Someone to Watch Over Me | Ridley Scott | First collaboration with Ridley Scott | |
| 1987 | Wall Street | Oliver Stone | Third collaboration with Oliver Stone | |
| 1987 | Hell High | Douglas Grossman | | |
| 1988 | Tequila Sunrise | Robert Towne | First collaboration with Robert Towne | |
| 1990 | State of Grace | Phil Joanou | | |
| 1992 | The Mambo Kings | Arne Glimcher | | |
| 1994 | Black Beauty | Caroline Thompson | | |
| 1996 | The Fan | Tony Scott | | |
| 1998 | Without Limits | Robert Towne | Second collaboration with Robert Towne | |
| 1999 | Jakob the Liar | Peter Kassovitz | | |
| 2001 | Town & Country | Peter Chelsom | | |
| 2002 | Possession | Neil LaBute | | |
| 2005 | The Return | Asif Kapadia | | |
| 2005 | The Constant Gardener | Fernando Meirelles | | |
| 2008 | Stop-Loss | Kimberly Peirce | | |
| 2008 | The Reader | Stephen Daldry | First collaboration with Stephen Daldry | |
| 2009 | Nine | Rob Marshall | | |
| 2011 | Extremely Loud & Incredibly Close | Stephen Daldry | Second collaboration with Stephen Daldry | |
| 2014 | A Most Wanted Man | Anton Corbijn | | |
| 2015 | Far from the Madding Crowd | Thomas Vinterberg | | |
| 2017 | The Snowman | Tomas Alfredson | | |
| 2017 | All the Money in the World | Ridley Scott | Second collaboration with Ridley Scott | |
| 2021 | The Last Duel | Ridley Scott | Third collaboration with Ridley Scott | |
| 2021 | House of Gucci | Ridley Scott | Fourth collaboration with Ridley Scott | |
| 2023 | Napoleon | Ridley Scott | Fifth collaboration with Ridley Scott | |
| 2024 | Gladiator II | Ridley Scott | Sixth collaboration with Ridley Scott | |
| 2026 | The Dog Stars | Ridley Scott | Seventh collaboration with Ridley Scott | |

=== Editorial department ===
| Year | Film | Director | Role | Notes |
|---|---|---|---|---|
| 1979 | Caligula | Tinto Brass | Third assistant editor | Uncredited |
| 1981 | Reds | Warren Beatty | Assistant film editor | |
| 2015 | Black Mass | Scott Cooper | Additional editing | |

=== Thanks ===
| Year | Film | Director | Role |
|---|---|---|---|
| 2003 | Imagining Argentina | Christopher Hampton | Thanks |
| 2011 | The Tree of Life | Terrence Malick | Special thanks |

=== TV movies ===
Editor
| Year | Film | Director | |
|---|---|---|---|
| 1983 | Peace on Borrowed Time | Malcolm Clarke | First collaboration with Malcolm Clarke |

=== TV series ===
Editor
| Year | Title | Notes |
|---|---|---|
| 2020 | Raised by Wolves | 1 episode |

=== Editorial department ===
| Year | Title | Role | Notes |
|---|---|---|---|
| 1983 | Kennedy | Editor | 7 episodes |

== Awards and nominations ==
- 2006 – The Constant Gardener (nominated) Best Film Editing
- 1987 – Platoon (won) Best Film Editing
- 2006 – The Constant Gardener (nominated) ACE Eddie - Best Edited Feature Film, Dramatic
- 2006 – The Constant Gardener (won) BAFTA Film Award - Best Editing
- 2006 – The Constant Gardener (nominated) OFCS Award (Online Film Critics Society) Best Editing
- 1987 – Platoon (won) ACE Eddie - Best Edited Feature Film
- 1988 – Platoon (won) BAFTA Film Award - Best Editing
