= Peter W. Heller =

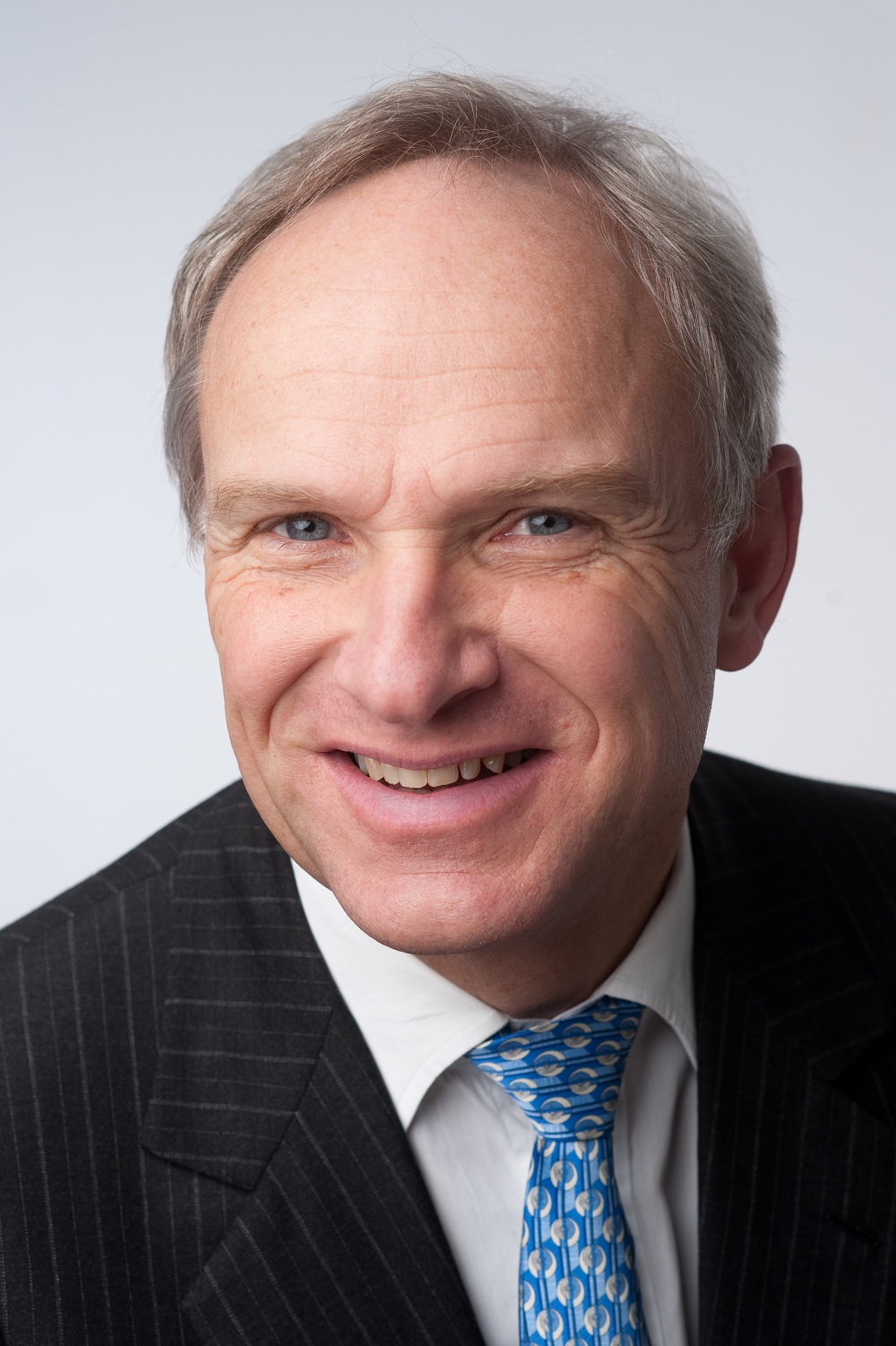
Peter W. Heller

Peter W. Heller (born 5 September 1957) is a former deputy mayor of the City of Freiburg im Breisgau in Germany, economist, investor and venture philanthropist.

== Early life ==
Peter W. Heller was born in Frankfurt am Main, the son of Wolfgang Heller, entrepreneur in the printing industry, and Ingeborg Heller. He studied economics and philosophy at the university of St. Gallen, university of Lausanne (Switzerland) and university of Freiburg (Germany) where he obtained his PhD (Dr. rer.pol.) in 1988 with a thesis on "The Problem of Environmental Degradation in Economic Theory". In 1988, he married Micaela Heller. They have two children, Julia (*1989) and Jakob (*1991), and two grandchildren, Romeo (*2019) and Milo (*2023).

== Professional career ==
1984 Heller was elected to the City Council of Freiburg and served on the council's committees for the municipal budget, environment, and culture. He left the council in 1990 after his election as deputy mayor.

1990 the council of the City of Freiburg im Breisgau elected him as deputy mayor to head the local administration's environmental protection department, the first of its kind in Southern Germany (until 1996). It comprised the offices of municipal environmental law and regulations, waste management, urban park and forestry services, local energy management and climate policy.

1993 the executive committee of ICLEI – Local Governments for Sustainability elected him as chairman (until 1997). ICLEI is a major global network and agency of local governments committed to environmental protection and local sustainability.

1997 Heller founded the investment company forseo GmbH which holds equity positions in companies of the solar PV, windpower, and energy efficiency industry. He co-founded solar PV and windpower development companies in Chile, Brazil and France, and has been a board member of several supervisory and advisory boards.

Heller is the co-founder and executive director of the Canopus Foundation, a private non-profit organisation which became one of the pioneers of venture philanthropy in Germany. Since 2000 the foundation has been providing grants and business development assistance to social enterprises active in the field of rural energy access for low income communities in developing countries. In 2001 he co-founded the "Basel Agency for Sustainable Energy (BASE)". Until 2016, the Canopus Foundation coordinated the international Solar for All initiative, founded jointly with Ashoka (organization) in 2008. Since 2014 the foundation has been promoting organisations in the field of new economic thinking towards more plurality in economic science, and encourages deliberation about the preconditions of a sustainable economy and society. In 2024 he was appointed to the advisory board of the Thales Academy in Freiburg i.Br.

== Selected publications ==
- Sustainable Human Development in a Medium-Sized City: The Example of Freiburg, Germany, 2002, edited by S. Sassen, in Encyclopedia of Life Support Systems (EOLSS), Developed under the Auspices of the UNESCO, Eolss Publishers, Oxford, UK,
- Climate Change – Wanted: First Movers, Alliance Magazine Vol. 14, Nr. 1, March 2009, p. 39 ff.
- (editor) Innovative Funding Mechanisms for Social Change, Baden-Baden 2009
- "Developing mutual success factors and their application to swarm electrification: microgrids with 100 % renewable energies in the Global South and Germany" (with Kirchhoff/Kebir/Neumann/Strunz) in: Journal of Cleaner Production Vol. 128 (2016), 190-200
- "The Philosophy of Theory U: A Critical Examination", in: Philosophy of Management (2018), DOI 10.1007/s40926-018-0087-0, 1-20; https://link.springer.com/article/10.1007/s40926-018-0087-0?wt_mc=Internal.Event.1.SEM.ArticleAuthorOnlineFirst
- "Entrepreneurship in the Context of Western vs. East Asian Economic Models", in: Seoul Journal of Economics 2020, Vol. 33, No. 4, pp. 539–559 [DOI: 10.22904/sje.2020.33.4.003]
- "The Lessons of Microcredit". In: K. Wendt (ed.): Theories of Change, Springer Nature Switzerland 2021, pp. 153–168 https://doi.org/10.1007/978-3-030-52275-9
- "Epilogue – cultural entrepreneurship in East Asia and the West: a practitioner’s perspective", in: C. Herrmann-Pillath, Qian Zhao (eds.): East Asian Ethical Life and Socio-Economic Transformation in the Twenty-First Century - The Ethical Sources of the Entrepreneurial Renewal of Companies and Communities, Routledge, Oxon 2024, pp. 249-262, ISBN 978-1-032-48498-3
- "Stiftungen hacken, Interview mit Sebastian Möller", In: L. Hochmann, S. Möller (Hrsg.): Organisationen hacken - Einfallstore in eine nachhaltige Arbeitswelt, oekom Verlag, München 2024, S. 239-252, ISBN 978-3-98726-085-8
- "Social Entrepreneurship und das unternehmerische Selbst", In: P. Kenel / J. Eschweiler / H. Hackenberg / M. Wihlenda (Hrsg.): Social Entrepreneurship in Deutschland - Handbuch für Wissenschaft und Praxis, utb/transcript Verlag, Bielefeld 2024, S. 155-168, ISBN 978-3-8252-6333-1
