= Peter Heller (writer) =

American author and kayaker

Peter Heller is an American author and kayaker.

== Early life and education ==
Peter Heller grew up in New York. He attended high school in Vermont at The Putney School and received an undergraduate degree from Dartmouth College. He received his master's degree from the Iowa Writers' Workshop where he received a Michener-Copernicus Fellowship for his poetry.

== Career ==
Heller has written for NPR, Men's Journal, and Outside Magazine.

== Personal life ==
Heller currently lives in Denver, Colorado.

== Awards and honors ==
The Painter won the Reading the West Book Award and was a 2014 finalist for the Los Angeles Times Book Prize for Mystery/Thriller. Kook: What Surfing Taught Me About Love, Life, and Catching the Perfect Wave won a National Outdoor Book Award in 2010.

== Bibliography ==
- Set Free in China: Sojourns on the Edge (1992)
- Hell or High Water: Surviving Tibet’s Tsangpo River (2004)
- The Whale Warriors: The Battle at the Bottom of the World to Save the Planet's Largest Mammals (2007)
- Kook: What Surfing Taught Me About Love, Life, and Catching the Perfect Wave (2010)
- The Dog Stars (2012)
- The Painter (2014)
- Celine (2017)
- The Orchard (2019)
- The River (2019)
- The Guide (2021)
- The Last Ranger (2023)
- Burn (2024)

== Adaptations ==
A film adaptation of The Dog Stars, directed by Ridley Scott, was released on August 28, 2026.
