= The Dog Stars =

2012 novel by Peter Heller

- First edition
- Author: Peter Heller
- Language: English
- Genre: Post-apocalyptic, adventure
- Publisher: Alfred A. Knopf
- Publication date: August 7, 2012
- Publication place: United States
- Pages: 320

The Dog Stars is a 2012 post-apocalyptic fiction novel by Peter Heller. It follows a pilot and mechanic, Hig, who is surviving at an abandoned airport after a pandemic. He meets other survivors, including a woman, while dealing with grief for his old life. The book was adapted into a movie, also called The Dog Stars, released in 2026.

== Plot ==
Nine years after an influenza pandemic and a subsequent blood disease kill most of the human population, Hig lives at an abandoned airport in Erie, Colorado. He shares the settlement with his aging dog, Jasper, and Bangley, an armed survivalist. Hig continues to mourn his wife, Melissa, who died from the flu while pregnant.

Hig and Bangley maintain a defensive perimeter around the airport. Hig patrols the surrounding area in the Beast, his vintage Cessna 182, while Bangley operates the settlement's weapons and fortifications. Their relationship is uneasy: Bangley regards strangers as threats, whereas Hig remains reluctant to abandon compassion. Against Bangley's advice, Hig regularly delivers supplies to a nearby community of Mennonites affected by the blood disease.

Three years before the principal events of the novel, Hig heard a faint radio response from the airport at Grand Junction, Colorado. He has not investigated it because Grand Junction lies beyond the aircraft's point of no return, meaning that he cannot reach it and return with the fuel he carries.

During a hunting and fishing trip in the mountains, Jasper dies peacefully in his sleep. Hig buries him and remains away from the airport longer than expected. On his journey home, he is followed by nine armed men. Bangley observes the pursuers from the airport and directs Hig into an ambush in which the attackers are killed.

Jasper's death leaves Hig without his closest connection to his former life. He decides to investigate the transmission from Grand Junction despite the possibility that he will not be able to return.

While flying west, Hig notices livestock, cultivated land and a stone house in an isolated canyon. After coming under fire and landing nearby, he is captured by an elderly former Navy SEAL known as Pops. Pops's daughter, Cima, persuades him to release Hig. Cima is a physician who survived the pandemic but lost her husband.

Hig remains in the canyon for several weeks and gradually earns their trust. He and Cima begin a romantic relationship. Because drought is threatening the canyon's water supply, Pops and Cima agree to leave with Hig and relocate to the Erie airport.

The three travel to Grand Junction to obtain aviation fuel. A voice from the control tower instructs Hig to land, but he notices a cable stretched across the runway as a trap for approaching aircraft. He lands beyond the cable, after which the occupants of the tower fire at the group. Pops returns fire and kills them. The group refuels the aircraft and continues towards Erie.

On returning to Erie, Hig, Cima and Pops discover that the airport has been attacked and partially destroyed. Bangley is initially missing but is eventually found alive and seriously wounded. He explains that fourteen attackers assaulted the compound and that he survived by using the settlement's heavy weapons. Cima treats his injuries, and he recovers.

The four survivors establish a new community at the airport. Pops and Bangley form a friendship, while Cima begins providing medical care to the nearby Mennonite families. Hig and Cima continue their relationship.

Hig later observes large jet aircraft flying overhead, but his attempts to contact them receive no response. Their presence suggests that other survivors may exist, although their origin and the condition of wider civilization remain unknown. The novel concludes with Hig and Cima together beneath the night sky, followed by the poem "When Will I Be Home?" by Li Shangyin.

== Reception ==
NPR described the novel as "crackerjack" and said: "With its soulful hero, macabre villains, tender (if thin) love story and action scenes staggered at perfectly spaced intervals, the story unfolds with the vigor of the film it will undoubtedly become. But it also succeeds as a dark, poetic and funny novel in its own right."

The Boston Globe also had praise for the novel, stating, "Peter Heller serves up an insightful account of physical, mental, and spiritual survival unfolded in dramatic and often lyrical prose, a difficult tale in which unexpected hope persistently flickers amid darkness."

== Film adaptation ==
On November 8, 2024, it was announced that Ridley Scott would direct a film adaptation of the novel for 20th Century Studios from a screenplay by Mark L. Smith. Principal photography began in Italy, in April 2025. The film was released on August 28, 2026.
