= San Francisco Bay Area Film Critics Circle Awards 2024 =

23rd San Francisco Bay Area Film Critics Circle Awards

23rd SFBAFCC Awards

December 15, 2024

Best Picture:
Anora

Best Animated Feature:
Flow

Best Documentary Feature:
Sugarcane

Best International Feature Film:
The Seed of the Sacred Fig

The 23rd San Francisco Bay Area Film Critics Circle Awards, honoring the best in film for 2024, were given on December 15, 2024. The nominations were announced on December 13, 2024, with The Brutalist leading the nominations with nine, followed by Conclave with seven and Anora with six.

Anora and The Brutalist received the most awards with four wins each; the former won Best Picture.

== Winners and nominees ==
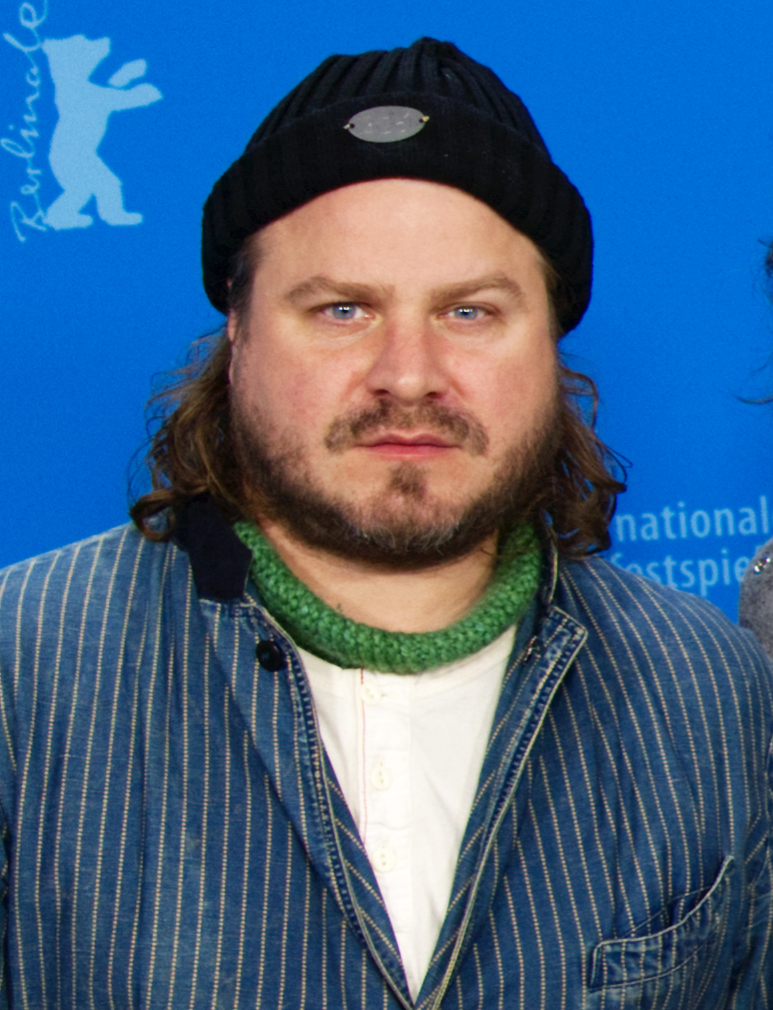
Brady Corbet, Best Director winner

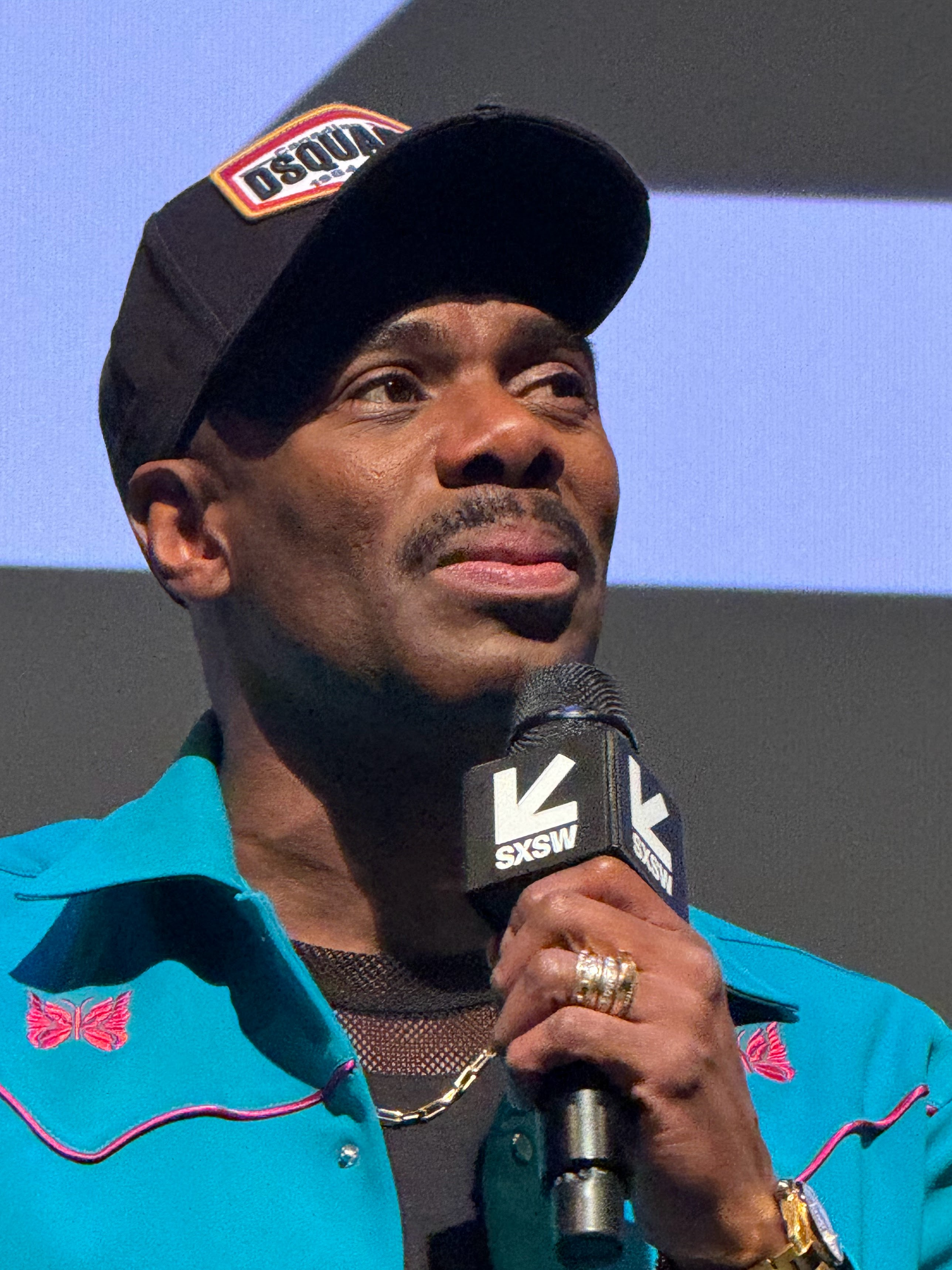
Colman Domingo, Best Actor winner

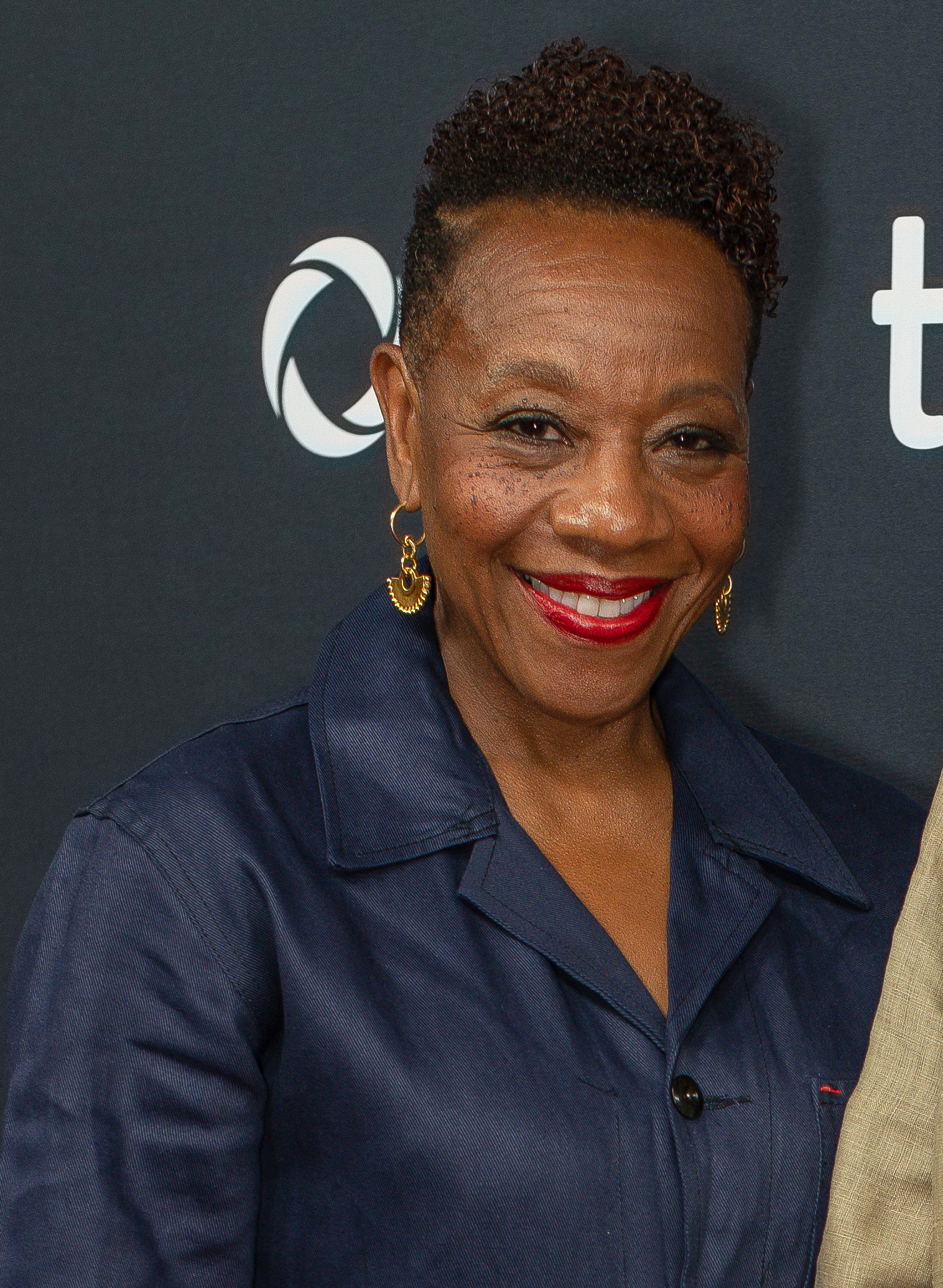
Marianne Jean-Baptiste, Best Actress winner

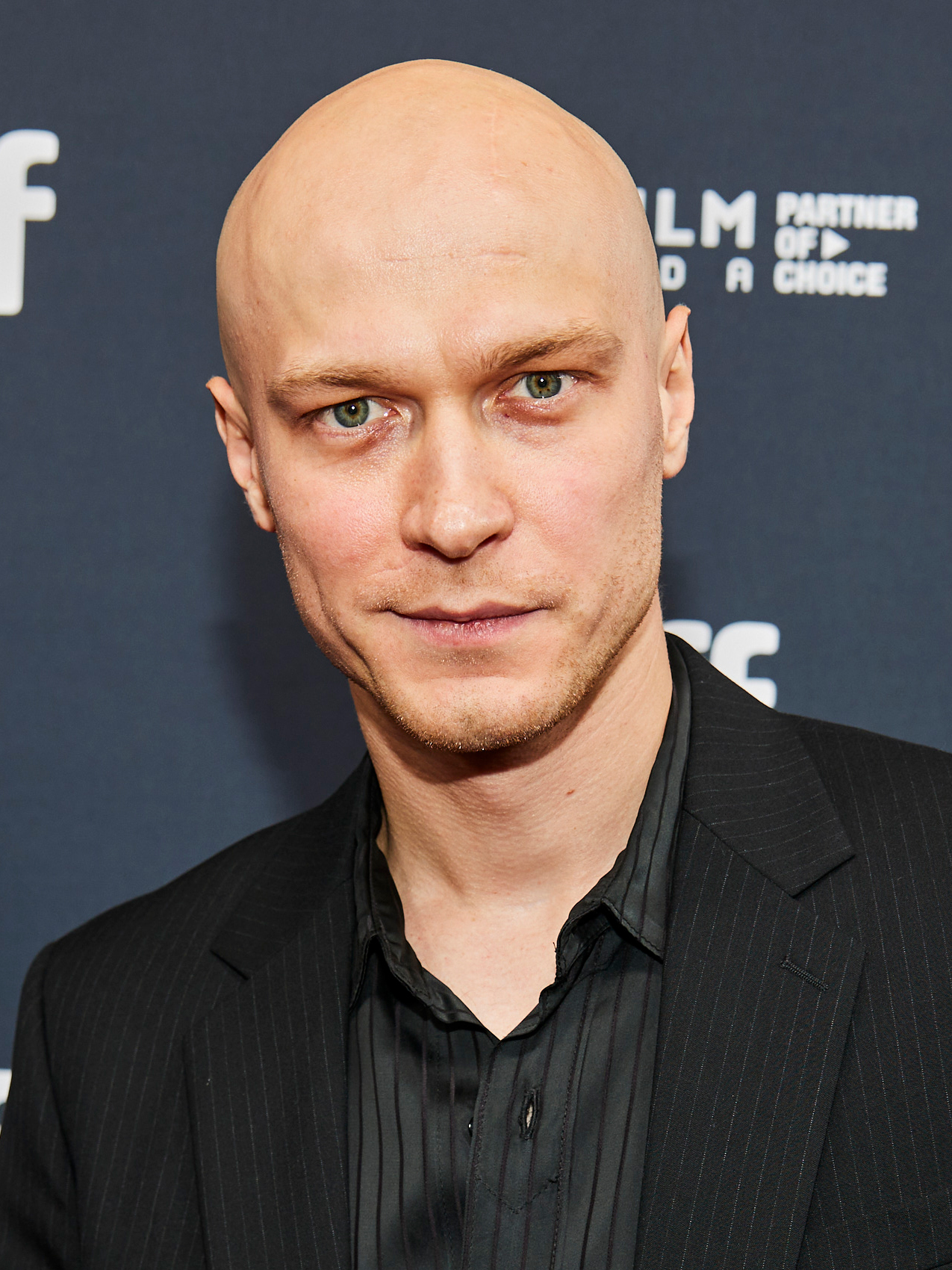
Yura Borisov, Best Supporting Actor winner

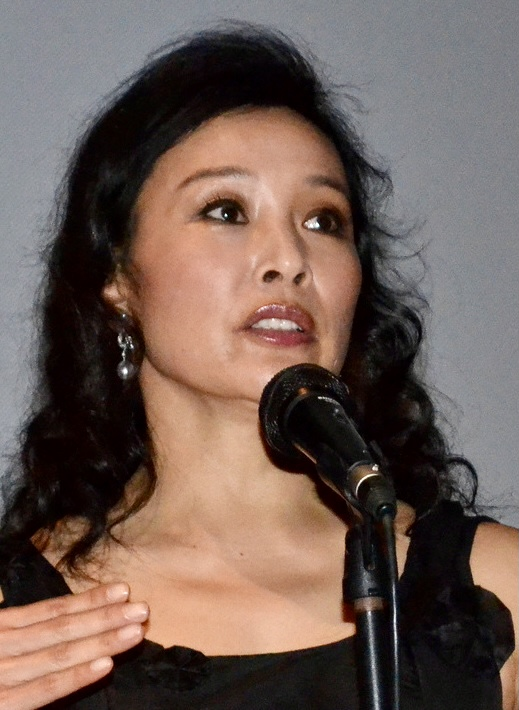
Joan Chen, Best Supporting Actress winner

These are the nominees for the 23rd SFBAFCC Awards. Winners are listed at the top of each list:

Best Picture	Best Director
Anora; The Brutalist; Hard Truths; Nickel Boys; Sing Sing	Brady Corbet – The Brutalist; Sean Baker – Anora; Coralie Fargeat – The Substance; Mike Leigh – Hard Truths; RaMell Ross – Nickel Boys
Best Actor	Best Actress
Colman Domingo – Sing Sing as John "Divine G" Whitfield; Adrien Brody – The Brutalist as László Tóth; Timothée Chalamet – A Complete Unknown as Bob Dylan; Daniel Craig – Queer as William Lee; Ralph Fiennes – Conclave as Cardinal Thomas Lawrence	Marianne Jean-Baptiste – Hard Truths as Pansy Deacon; Karla Sofía Gascón – Emilia Pérez as Emilia Pérez / Juan "Manitas" Del Monte; Angelina Jolie – Maria as Maria Callas; Mikey Madison – Anora as Anora "Ani" Mikheeva; Demi Moore – The Substance as Elisabeth Sparkle
Best Supporting Actor	Best Supporting Actress
Yura Borisov – Anora as Igor; Kieran Culkin – A Real Pain as Benji Kaplan; Clarence Maclin – Sing Sing as Clarence "Divine Eye" Maclin; Guy Pearce – The Brutalist as Harrison Lee Van Buren Sr.; Jeremy Strong – The Apprentice as Roy Cohn	Joan Chen – Dìdi as Chungsing Wang; Ariana Grande – Wicked as Galinda Upland; Carol Kane – Between the Temples as Carla Kessler; Isabella Rossellini – Conclave as Sister Agnes; Zoe Saldaña – Emilia Pérez as Rita Mora Castro
Best Adapted Screenplay	Best Original Screenplay
Sing Sing – Clint Bentley, Greg Kwedar, Clarence Maclin, and John "Divine G" Whitfield; Conclave – Peter Straughan; Dune: Part Two – Denis Villeneuve and Jon Spaihts; Emilia Pérez – Jacques Audiard; Nickel Boys – RaMell Ross and Joslyn Barnes	Anora – Sean Baker; The Brutalist – Brady Corbet and Mona Fastvold; Hard Truths – Mike Leigh; A Real Pain – Jesse Eisenberg; The Substance – Coralie Fargeat
Best Animated Feature	Best Documentary Feature
Flow; Inside Out 2; Memoir of a Snail; Wallace & Gromit: Vengeance Most Fowl; The Wild Robot	Sugarcane; Daughters; No Other Land; Super/Man: The Christopher Reeve Story; Will & Harper
Best International Feature Film	Best Cinematography
The Seed of the Sacred Fig (Germany); All We Imagine as Light (India); Emilia Pérez (France); I'm Still Here (Brazil); Kneecap (Ireland)	The Brutalist – Lol Crawley; Conclave – Stéphane Fontaine; Dune: Part Two – Greig Fraser; Nickel Boys – Jomo Fray; Nosferatu – Jarin Blaschke
Best Film Editing	Best Original Score
Anora – Sean Baker; The Brutalist – Dávid Jancsó; Challengers – Marco Costa; Conclave – Nick Emerson; September 5 – Hansjörg Weißbrich	The Brutalist – Daniel Blumberg; Challengers – Trent Reznor and Atticus Ross; Conclave – Volker Bertelmann; Emilia Pérez – Clément Ducol and Camille; The Wild Robot – Kris Bowers
Best Production Design
The Brutalist – Judy Becker; Conclave – Suzie Davies and Roberta Federico; Dune: Part Two – Zsuzsanna Sipos, Shane Vieau, and Patrice Vermette; Nosferatu – Craig Lathrop; Wicked – Nathan Crowley and Lee Sandales

== Special awards ==
=== Special Citation for Independent Cinema ===
- Femme
  - Exhibiting Forgiveness
  - The Secret Art of Human Flight

=== Marlon Riggs Award ===
- San Quentin Film Festival (Rahsaan "New York" Thomas and Cori Thomas)
