= Sing Sing (2023 film) =

American film directed by Greg Kwedar

- Theatrical release poster
- Directed by: Greg Kwedar
- Screenplay by: Clint Bentley; Greg Kwedar
- Story by: Clint Bentley; Greg Kwedar; Clarence Maclin; John "Divine G" Whitfield
- Based on: "The Sing Sing Follies" by John H. Richardson; Breakin' the Mummy's Code by Brent Buell
- Produced by: Clint Bentley; Greg Kwedar; Monique Walton
- Starring: Colman Domingo; Clarence Maclin; Sean San José; Paul Raci
- Cinematography: Pat Scola
- Edited by: Parker Laramie
- Music by: Bryce Dessner
- Production companies: Black Bear Pictures; Marfa Peach Company
- Distributed by: A24
- Release dates: September 10, 2023 (TIFF); July 12, 2024 (United States)
- Running time: 105 minutes
- Country: United States
- Language: English
- Budget: $2 million
- Box office: $5.1 million

Sing Sing is a 2023 American biographical prison drama film directed by Greg Kwedar, who co-wrote the screenplay with Clint Bentley. Based on the real-life Rehabilitation Through the Arts program at Sing Sing Maximum Security Prison, the film centers on a group of incarcerated men involved in the creation of theatrical stage shows through the program. It stars professional actors Colman Domingo, Sean San José and Paul Raci, alongside many real-life formerly incarcerated men who were themselves alumni of the program during their incarceration, including Clarence "Divine Eye" Maclin and Jon-Adrian "JJ" Velazquez.

The film premiered in the Special Presentations program at the 2023 Toronto International Film Festival. It was released by A24 in the United States on July 12, 2024. It received acclaim from critics and was named one of the top ten films of 2024 by the National Board of Review and the American Film Institute. It received numerous accolades, including three nominations at the 78th British Academy Film Awards (including Best Actor for Domingo and Best Supporting Actor for Maclin) and at the 97th Academy Awards (including Best Actor for Domingo).

== Plot ==
In 2005, Divine G is incarcerated at Sing Sing Correctional Facility in Ossining, New York, and he discovers a sense of purpose through participation in a small theater group made up of fellow inmates. These inmates are part of the Rehabilitation Through the Arts (RTA) program, which aims to use theater as a form of rehabilitation. Under the guidance of theater director Brent Buell, Divine G emerges as the star playwright and performer, highly respected for his emotional depth and acting talent. While pursuing his passion for theater, Divine G is also determined to prove his innocence and regain his freedom.

As the group prepares for their new production, Divine G takes part in recruiting new members, including a gruff and aggressive inmate named Divine Eye with a difficult personality. Initially, Divine Eye is dismissive of acting and performance, considering it a pointless and disingenuous pursuit. In contrast, Divine G views theater as a transformative and therapeutic process that helps individuals connect with their inner selves. The two men clash further when they disagree on the genre of their next play. Divine G advocates for another drama to challenge his acting abilities, while Divine Eye pushes for a lighthearted comedy, a choice supported by the majority of the inmates. Their rivalry intensifies when Divine Eye auditions for the only dramatic role in the comedy, frustrating Divine G, who sees it as hypocritical and is puzzled by this decision from Divine Eye.

Over the following weeks, the inmates engage in acting exercises led by Buell, designed to help them tap into their emotions. Divine G excels effortlessly at all the acting exercises, demonstrating vulnerability and inspiring his peers, while Divine Eye struggles, unable to connect with his emotions or the art of acting. However, after a heart-to-heart conversation where the two open up about their personal lives, Divine Eye begins to open up and take the program more seriously. His acting skills gradually improve, earning the respect of the group, including Divine G and Buell.

The RTA group eventually performs a sample of the play for the prison's board of executives to gain approval for their production. Despite a chaotic and mixed performance, the board approves the play, surprising the RTA group.

Divine G's world is shaken with grief and sadness when a fellow inmate, Mike Mike, with whom he had bonded, passes away due to a brain aneurysm.

At a clemency hearing, Divine G presents evidence that another man confessed to the crime he is incarcerated for and delivers a passionate speech about how acting has changed him for the better. He is blindsided when the interviewer questions whether he is simply acting at the present moment that he is delivering this parole hearing. Divine G's parole is denied, while Divine Eye's hearing is approved and he is granted release. During a dress rehearsal of the play, Divine G suffers a breakdown, having lost hope that the RTA program will make any difference in helping them. Frustrated and disillusioned, he attempts to fight Divine Eye and walks out of the performance, quitting RTA.

In the following days, Divine G isolates himself. Divine Eye eventually reaches out and the two reconcile. Divine G apologizes for his outburst and Divine Eye reassures him that he is always welcome back in the group. The play is a success and Divine Eye is soon released from the facility, becoming a free man.

Seven years later, Divine G successfully passes his parole hearing and is released. Divine Eye waits outside to greet him and the two share an emotional reunion before driving away together, hopeful for the future. The film closes with real-life footage from the RTA program at Sing Sing, featuring the real actors who portrayed themselves in the film, performing in past productions when they were still inmates at the facility.

== Cast ==
- Colman Domingo as John "Divine G" Whitfield
- Clarence "Divine Eye" Maclin as himself
- Sean San José as Mike Mike
- Paul Raci as Brent Buell
- Johnny Simmons as Clay, an inmate who tries to double-cross Divine Eye
- Sharon Washington as the lead commissioner

Along with Maclin, the supporting cast also consists of real-life formerly incarcerated men who were themselves alumni of the RTA program, portraying themselves in the film, including:

- David "Dap" Giraudy
- Patrick "Preme" Griffin
- Mosi Eagle
- James "Big E" Williams
- Sean "Dino" Johnson
- Dario Peña
- Miguel Valentin
- Jon-Adrian "JJ" Velazquez
- Pedro Cotto
- Camillo "Carmine" Lovacco
- Cornell "Nate" Alston

The real-life John "Divine G" Whitfield also cameos as an inmate who asks the fictionalized Divine G to sign his book.

== Production ==
=== Development ===
In 2022, it was reported that Colman Domingo, Paul Raci, and Sean San José were cast and that they would act alongside former incarcerated actors, including Clarence "Divine Eye" Maclin. Inspired by the Rehabilitation Through the Arts program at the Sing Sing Correctional Facility in New York, the story was developed by Clint Bentley, Greg Kwedar, Maclin and John "Divine G" Whitfield, with the screenplay being written by Bentley and Kwedar. The latter also came onboard to direct while Monique Walton joined as producer, alongside Bentley and Kwedar.

Maclin started acting as an inmate in Sing Sing. According to Maclin, the experience of acting in the film, along with his time in the prison and the transformative theater program, changed the course of his life. He revealed that it was his decision to star as a version of himself, explaining: "It was a choice that Greg and Clint had given me. They said, we can make up a character for you and give them a fictitious name, or you could just use your own name and be your own character, and I chose to use my own name. I guess it was my own arrogance."

In exchange for a percentage of equity, variating based on level of overall production involvement, all cast and crew agreed to be paid the same daily salary, thus ensuring a lower budget with increased profitability potential. As a result, with only one month out from filmmaking, Black Bear Pictures agreed to fully finance the film.

=== Filming ===
Sing Sing was filmed over the course of 19 shooting days in July 2022, across numerous decommissioned correctional facilities, which are reportedly tough environments to be in, logistically and for formerly incarcerated actors to return to, even with a counselor in tow. "It's all concrete and there's just no airflow", said Bentley, adding: "But whenever the alumni were filming together, they brought so much joy that it far surpassed any of the misery of filming in that place. Walking into the space they'd created was like walking into color in The Wizard of Oz."

The three major filming locations were split between the decommissioned Downstate Correctional Facility and nearby Hudson Sports Complex, both of which doubled for different exteriors and interiors of the real Sing Sing prison, plus Beacon High School in Upstate New York, where the RTA theater productions were filmed. The film cost under $2 million to produce.

=== Cinematography ===
Cinematographer Pat Scola shot the film on 16 mm. "When we scouted the Downstate Correctional Facility, one of the things I found both impressive and oppressive, was the number of windows and the natural daylight coming through them", Scola recalled. "Beyond the confines of the prison walls and the razor wire, you can see trees and forests in the distance. That element of tragedy – that you can see the world out there, but can't actually go and touch it, that the place was actually light and warm, and not bleakly lit with fluorescents – was really striking. We made the decision to allow the spaces to light themselves naturalistically and speak to the visual story we were looking to tell." As for shooting on 16mm film, Scola said: "In this story, the human face was our landscape, often with very intimate close-ups. The taller nature of the 1.66:1 frame allowed us to create that kind of intimate portraiture, and we used the 25mm a great deal during production ... The Ultra 16 lenses are small, simple and fast, typically T1.3, and give great optical performance on 16mm film."

=== Music ===
Bryce Dessner composed the film's score, which was released by Milan Records on July 12, 2024. Adrian Quesada and Abraham Alexander wrote and performed the song "Like A Bird," which appears during the film's credits. The song was nominated at the 97th Academy Awards for Best Original Song.

Elaborating on the process of the biggest dramatic considerations he took while composing, Dessner explained: "The film itself has elements of documentary. It has real-life characters who were in the program, it has a play within the film, and it has a sense of creative freedom or finding your horizon. These characters are finding their humanity, rebuilding themselves through the arts, and dreaming beyond the walls of where they're confined. The music kind of felt in that space. It was the horizon, or the poetry, of the whole thing. I was relating to that. I wasn't really scoring tension or drama or the little bits of conflict that happen. There are some darker cues, but in general, the music feels like this sort of river running under the film."

Sing Sing: Original Soundtrack
No.	Title	Length
1.	"Lysander"	1:27
2.	"Sing Sing"	2:04
3.	"Auditions"	4:43
4.	"Portal to Portal"	4:16
5.	"Blades"	3:06
6.	"Perfect Place"	2:14
7.	"Escape"	2:53
8.	"Song & Dance"	2:31
9.	"Miguelito"	1:16
10.	"Slow Time"	2:24
11.	"Backstage"	5:14
12.	"The Void"	3:31
13.	"Circles"	0:35
14.	"Come Home"	2:11
15.	"Homeward"	1:01
16.	"Seven Years of Curtain Calls"	2:05
17.	"The Gate"	1:25
Total length:		40:56

=== Marketing ===
To promote the film, A24 offered free screenings hosted by Common, Stephanie Hsu, Liza Koshy, Natasha Lyonne, Bette Midler, the Brooklyn Nets and Gabrielle Union, in participating AMC Theatres from August 22 to 28. Variety said that while "A24 is looking to position Sing Sing as a major awards player ... [its] campaign is uniquely audience-facing, as opposed to targeting Oscar voters later in the awards season".

== Release ==
The film premiered in the Special Presentations program at the 2023 Toronto International Film Festival, where it was acquired by A24.

It was released in the United States in a limited release on July 12, 2024, with a planned wide release on August 2. However, the wide release did not materialize, expanding weeks later to only 191 theaters. It was not made available on video on demand or streaming at that time. It was later announced to be re-released in 500 theaters on January 17, 2025, as part of its awards season campaign before the 97th Academy Awards nomination announcement on January 23. Edovo, a non-profit organization providing educational material to inmates, is set to begin streaming the film to participating prisons on January 17, in collaboration with A24 and RTA. The film was eventually released on digital video on demand on January 31, 2025.

== Reception ==
=== Box office ===
As of February 23, 2025, Sing Sing has grossed $5.2 million. In the United States, the film made $137,119 from four theaters (located in Los Angeles and New York) in its opening weekend (July 12–14), for a per-screen-average of $34,279. IndieWire noted: "In an unusual move, it is expected to not expand until August in order to build expected word of mouth and avoid competing with the juggernauts the next two weeks." In its fourth weekend (August 2–4), the film expanded to 18 theaters and made $164,565. It peaked at 191 theaters before returning to 149 screens in its eighth weekend. The film ended its original theatrical run after thirteen weeks in October 2024. In January 2025, it was re-released in 560 theaters, earning $289,829 over the four-day MLK weekend.

=== Critical response ===
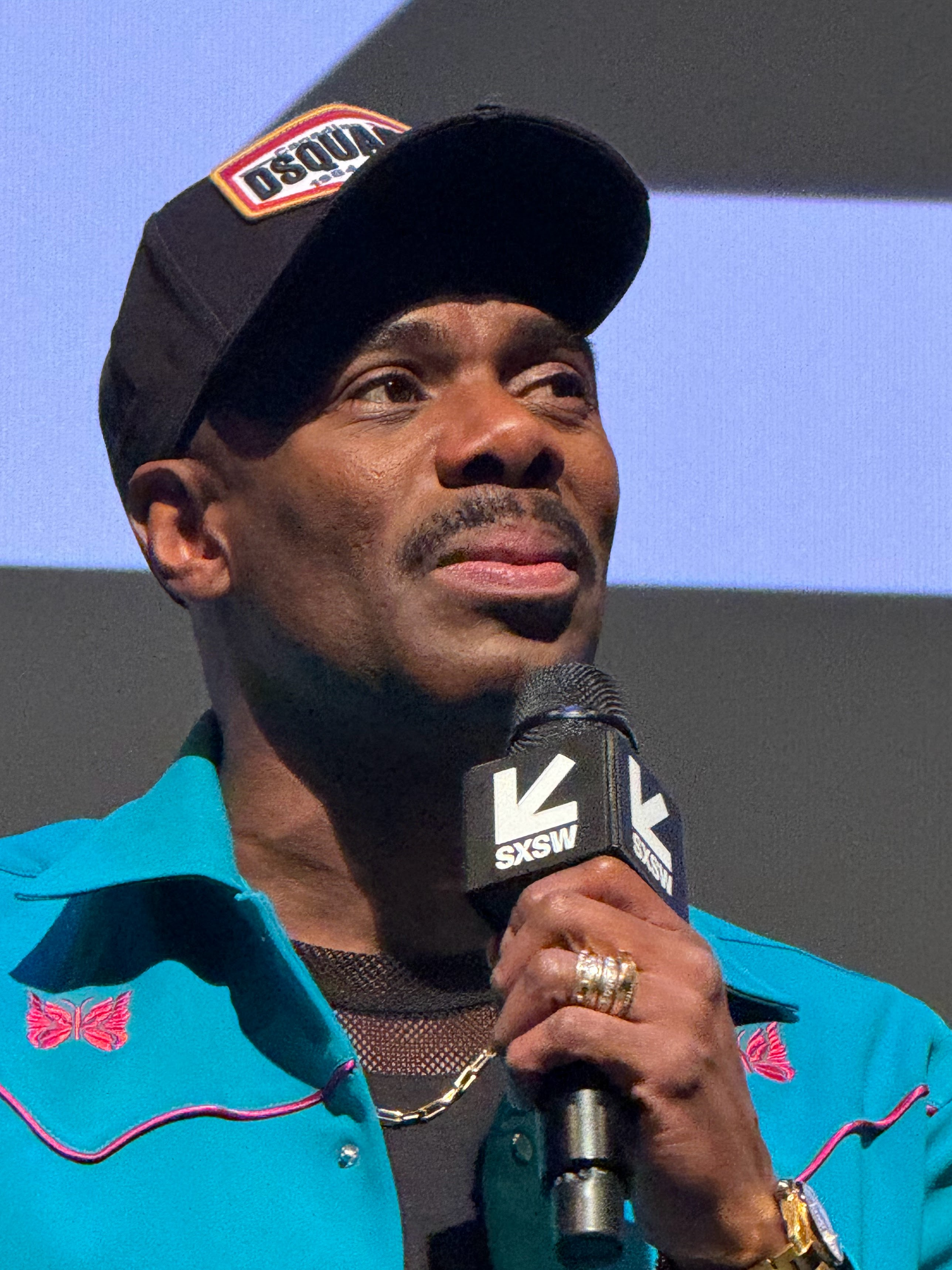
Colman Domingo garnered critical acclaim for his performance and earned an Academy Award nomination for Best Actor.

On the review aggregator website Rotten Tomatoes, 97% of 214 critics' reviews are positive, with an average rating of 8.6/10. The website's consensus reads: "A moving celebration of art's redemptive power, Sing Sing draws its estimable emotional resonance from a never better Colman Domingo and equally impressive ensemble players." Metacritic, which uses a weighted average, assigned the film a score of 83 out of 100, based on 43 critics, indicating "universal acclaim".

ABC News' Peter Travers declared the acting of Domingo as "simply stupendous" and highly praised the film in his review, writing: "Sing Sing is one of the best and most powerful movies you'll see this year. Despite the grim surroundings, it has a heart full to bursting and a spirit that soars." Richard Roeper of the Chicago Sun-Times called the film "gloriously lionhearted and brilliantly rendered", and considered Domingo's performance as "award-worthy work", concluding that the film "will be remembered for the amazing, multilayered, complex and shining work by Domingo and the entire ensemble". Though she believed the film "shoulders some heavy-duty ideas about forgiveness and redemption", Stephanie Zacharek of Time believed that it recognized the value and delight of pure play, writing: "It's easy, and comfortable, to pass judgment [about incarcerated individuals]. But Greg Kwedar's true-to-life prison drama Sing Sing asks more of us: 'If we believe in our own capacity for growth and change, how can we not extend that good faith to other individuals who have made mistakes?'"

Filmmaker Jeff Nichols named it one of his favorite films of 2024, saying "Greg Kwedar blended part-scripted, part-improvised experiences into a delicate film unlike anything I’ve ever seen. I’m proud of my friend Greg, but most importantly I’m proud that this film is in the world. It’s an example of the best of us, both as an industry and as a society." Other filmmakers, including Tim Fehlbaum, William Goldenberg, Nicole Holofcener, Rich Peppiatt and Daniel Scheinert also praised the film.

In 2025, it was one of the films voted for the "Readers' Choice" edition of The New York Times' list of "The 100 Best Movies of the 21st Century," finishing at number 298.

=== Accolades ===
Award	Date of ceremony	Category	Recipient(s)	Result	Ref.
AACTA International Awards	February 7, 2025	Best Actor	Colman Domingo	Nominated	
AARP Movies for Grownups Awards	February 25, 2025	Best Actor	Colman Domingo	Nominated	
AARP Movies for Grownups Awards	February 25, 2025	Best Supporting Actor	Clarence Maclin	Nominated	
AARP Movies for Grownups Awards	February 25, 2025	Best Ensemble	Sing Sing	Won	
Academy Awards	March 2, 2025	Best Actor	Colman Domingo	Nominated	
Academy Awards	March 2, 2025	Best Adapted Screenplay	Greg Kwedar, Clint Bentley, Clarence Maclin, and John "Divine G" Whitfield	Nominated	
Academy Awards	March 2, 2025	Best Original Song	"Like a Bird" - Abraham Alexander and Adrian Quesada	Nominated	
Alliance of Women Film Journalists	January 7, 2025	Best Film	Sing Sing	Nominated	
Alliance of Women Film Journalists	January 7, 2025	Best Actor	Colman Domingo	Won	
Alliance of Women Film Journalists	January 7, 2025	Best Actor in a Supporting Role	Clarence Maclin	Nominated	
Alliance of Women Film Journalists	January 7, 2025	Best Adapted Screenplay	John H. Richardson, Brent Buell & Clint Bentley, Greg Kwedar	Nominated	
Astra Film Awards	December 8, 2024	Best Picture	Sing Sing	Nominated	
Astra Film Awards	December 8, 2024	Best Adapted Screenplay	Clint Bentley and Greg Kwedar	Nominated	
Astra Film Awards	December 8, 2024	Best Actor	Colman Domingo	Nominated	
Astra Film Awards	December 8, 2024	Best Supporting Actor	Clarence Maclin	Nominated	
Austin Film Critics Association	January 6, 2025	Best Film	Sing Sing	Nominated	
Austin Film Critics Association	January 6, 2025	Best Actor	Colman Domingo	Won	
Austin Film Critics Association	January 6, 2025	Best Supporting Actor	Clarence Maclin	Nominated	
Austin Film Critics Association	January 6, 2025	Best Adapted Screenplay	Greg Kwedar and Clint Bentley	Won	
Austin Film Critics Association	January 6, 2025	Best Ensemble	Sing Sing	Won	
Austin Film Critics Association	January 6, 2025	Best Austin Film 2024	Sing Sing	Won	
Black Reel Awards	February 10, 2025	Outstanding Film	Sing Sing	Nominated	
Black Reel Awards	February 10, 2025	Outstanding Lead Performance	Colman Domingo	Nominated	
Black Reel Awards	February 10, 2025	Outstanding Supporting Performance	Clarence Maclin	Nominated	
Black Reel Awards	February 10, 2025	Outstanding Breakthrough Performance	Clarence Maclin	Won	
Black Reel Awards	February 10, 2025	Outstanding Ensemble	Greg Kwedar	Nominated	
Black Reel Awards	February 10, 2025	Outstanding Original Song	"Like a Bird" – Adrian Quesada and Abraham Alexander	Nominated	
Boston Society of Film Critics	December 8, 2024	Best Ensemble Cast	Sing Sing	Won	
British Academy Film Awards	16 February 2025	Best Actor in a Leading Role	Colman Domingo	Nominated	
British Academy Film Awards	16 February 2025	Best Actor in a Supporting Role	Clarence Maclin	Nominated	
British Academy Film Awards	16 February 2025	Best Adapted Screenplay	Clint Bentley, Greg Kwedar, Clarence Maclin, and John "Divine G" Whitfield	Nominated	
Chicago Film Critics Association	December 12, 2024	Best Actor	Colman Domingo	Nominated	
Chicago Film Critics Association	December 12, 2024	Best Supporting Actor	Clarence Maclin	Nominated	
Chicago Film Critics Association	December 12, 2024	Most Promising Performer	Clarence Maclin	Won	
Chicago Film Critics Association	December 12, 2024	Best Adapted Screenplay	Clint Bentley, Greg Kwedar, Clarence Maclin, & John Whitfield	Nominated	
Chicago Film Critics Association	December 12, 2024	Milos Stehlik Award for Breakthrough Filmmaker	Greg Kwedar	Nominated	
Cinema Eye Honors	January 9, 2025	Heterodox Award	Sing Sing	Nominated	
Critics' Choice Movie Awards	January 12, 2025	Best Picture	Sing Sing	Nominated	
Critics' Choice Movie Awards	January 12, 2025	Best Actor	Colman Domingo	Nominated	
Critics' Choice Movie Awards	January 12, 2025	Best Supporting Actor	Clarence Maclin	Nominated	
Critics' Choice Movie Awards	January 12, 2025	Best Acting Ensemble	Sing Sing	Nominated	
Critics' Choice Movie Awards	January 12, 2025	Best Adapted Screenplay	Greg Kwedar and Clint Bentley	Nominated	
Dallas–Fort Worth Film Critics Association	December 18, 2024	Best Picture	Sing Sing	10th Place	
Dallas–Fort Worth Film Critics Association	December 18, 2024	Best Actor	Colman Domingo	4th Place	
Dallas–Fort Worth Film Critics Association	December 18, 2024	Best Supporting Actor	Clarence Maclin	5th Place	
Deauville American Film Festival	September 15, 2024	Grand Special Prize	Sing Sing	Nominated	
Golden Globe Awards	January 5, 2025	Best Performance by a Male Actor in a Motion Picture – Drama	Colman Domingo	Nominated	
Golden Trailer Awards	May 30, 2024	Best Independent Trailer	Reality Trailer, A24, and Mark Woollen & Associates	Nominated	
Gotham Awards	December 2, 2024	Outstanding Lead Performance	Colman Domingo	Won	
Gotham Awards	December 2, 2024	Outstanding Supporting Performance	Clarence Maclin	Won	
Gotham Awards	December 2, 2024	Social Justice Tribute	Cast of Sing Sing	Won	
Greater Western New York Film Critics Association	January 4, 2025	Best Lead Actor	Colman Domingo	Won	
Greater Western New York Film Critics Association	January 4, 2025	Best Adapted Screenplay	Greg Kwedar, Clint Bentley, Clarence Maclin, and John Whitfield	Won	
Greater Western New York Film Critics Association	January 4, 2025	Best Breakthrough Performance	Clarence Maclin	Won	
Greater Western New York Film Critics Association	January 4, 2025	Best Supporting Actor	Clarence Maclin	Nominated	
Hamptons International Film Festival	October 14, 2024	Breakthrough Performer Award	Clarence Maclin	Won	
Independent Spirit Awards	February 22, 2025	Best Feature	Clint Bentley, Greg Kwedar, and Monique Walton	Nominated	
Independent Spirit Awards	February 22, 2025	Best Lead Performance	Colman Domingo	Nominated	
Independent Spirit Awards	February 22, 2025	Best Supporting Performance	Clarence Maclin	Nominated	
Los Angeles Film Critics Association	December 8, 2024	Best Supporting Performance	Clarence Maclin	Runner-up (Note: Tied with Adam Pearson for A Different Man.)	
Miami Film Festival	April 14, 2024	Impact Award	Greg Kwedar	Won	
Middleburg Film Festival	October 20, 2024	Impact Award	Colman Domingo and Clarence Maclin	Won	
NAACP Image Awards	February 22, 2025	Outstanding Independent Motion Picture	Sing Sing	Won	
NAACP Image Awards	February 22, 2025	Outstanding Actor in a Motion Picture	Colman Domingo	Nominated	
NAACP Image Awards	February 22, 2025	Outstanding Breakthrough Performance in a Motion Picture	Clarence Maclin	Nominated	
National Board of Review	December 4, 2024	Top 10 Films	Sing Sing	Won (Note: This award does not have a single winner, but recognizes multiple films.)	
National Board of Review	December 4, 2024	Best Adapted Screenplay	Clint Bentley and Greg Kwedar	Won	
New York Film Critics Online	December 16, 2024	Best Picture	Sing Sing	Nominated	
New York Film Critics Online	December 16, 2024	Best Actor	Colman Domingo	Nominated	
New York Film Critics Online	December 16, 2024	Best Supporting Actor	Clarence Maclin	Runner-up	
New York Film Critics Online	December 16, 2024	Breakthrough Performer	Clarence Maclin	Runner-up	
New York Film Critics Online	December 16, 2024	Best Ensemble Cast	Sing Sing	Runner-up	
Palm Springs International Film Festival	January 3, 2025	Spotlight Award	Colman Domingo	Won	
San Diego Film Critics Society	December 9, 2024	Best Picture	Sing Sing	Won	
San Diego Film Critics Society	December 9, 2024	Best Director	Greg Kwedar	Nominated	
San Diego Film Critics Society	December 9, 2024	Best Actor	Colman Domingo	Won	
San Diego Film Critics Society	December 9, 2024	Best Supporting Actor	Clarence Maclin	Nominated	
San Diego Film Critics Society	December 9, 2024	Best Adapted Screenplay	Craig Bentley and Greg Kwedar	Won	
San Diego Film Critics Society	December 9, 2024	Best Cinematography	Pat Scola	Nominated	
San Diego Film Critics Society	December 9, 2024	Best Ensemble	Sing Sing	Nominated	
San Diego Film Critics Society	December 9, 2024	Best Stunt Choreography	Sing Sing	Nominated	
San Francisco Bay Area Film Critics Circle	December 15, 2024	Best Film	Sing Sing	Nominated	
San Francisco Bay Area Film Critics Circle	December 15, 2024	Best Actor	Colman Domingo	Won	
San Francisco Bay Area Film Critics Circle	December 15, 2024	Best Supporting Actor	Clarence Maclin	Nominated	
San Francisco Bay Area Film Critics Circle	December 15, 2024	Best Adapted Screenplay	Clint Bentley, Greg Kwedar, Clarence Maclin and John "Divine G" Whitfield	Won	
Santa Barbara International Film Festival	February 9, 2025	Virtuoso Award	Clarence Maclin	Won	
Satellite Awards	January 26, 2025	Best Motion Picture – Drama	Sing Sing	Nominated	
Satellite Awards	January 26, 2025	Best Director	Greg Kwedar	Nominated	
Satellite Awards	January 26, 2025	Best Actor in a Motion Picture – Drama	Colman Domingo	Won	
Satellite Awards	January 26, 2025	Best Supporting Actor	Clarence Maclin	Nominated	
Satellite Awards	January 26, 2025	Best Adapted Screenplay	Clint Bentley, Greg Kwedar, Clarence Maclin, and John "Divine G" Whitfield	Nominated	
SCAD Savannah Film Festival	November 2, 2024	Spotlight Award	Colman Domingo	Won	
Screen Actors Guild Awards	February 23, 2025	Outstanding Performance by a Male Actor in a Leading Role	Colman Domingo	Nominated	
Seattle Film Critics Society	December 16, 2024	Best Picture	Sing Sing	Nominated	
Seattle Film Critics Society	December 16, 2024	Best Lead Actor	Colman Domingo	Won	
Seattle Film Critics Society	December 16, 2024	Best Supporting Actor	Clarence Maclin	Won	
Seattle Film Critics Society	December 16, 2024	Best Ensemble	Greg Kwedar	Nominated	
Seattle International Film Festival	May 27, 2024	Golden Space Needle Award: Best Film	Sing Sing	Won	
Southwest Film & TV Festival	March 16, 2024	Audience Award: Festival Favorite	Sing Sing	Won	
St. Louis Film Critics Association	December 15, 2024	Best Film	Sing Sing	Nominated	
St. Louis Film Critics Association	December 15, 2024	Best Actor	Colman Domingo	Won	
St. Louis Film Critics Association	December 15, 2024	Best Supporting Actor	Clarence Maclin	Nominated	
St. Louis Film Critics Association	December 15, 2024	Best Adapted Screenplay	Greg Kwedar and Clint Bentley	Nominated	
St. Louis Film Critics Association	December 15, 2024	Best Ensemble	Sing Sing	Nominated	
Toronto Film Critics Association	December 15, 2024	Best Lead Performance	Colman Domingo	Runner-up	
Toronto Film Critics Association	December 15, 2024	Best Supporting Performance	Clarence Maclin	Runner-up	
Toronto Film Critics Association	December 15, 2024	Best Breakthrough Performance	Clarence Maclin	Won	
Washington D.C. Area Film Critics Association	December 8, 2024	Best Film	Sing Sing	Nominated	
Washington D.C. Area Film Critics Association	December 8, 2024	Best Actor	Colman Domingo	Won	
Washington D.C. Area Film Critics Association	December 8, 2024	Best Supporting Actor	Clarence Maclin	Nominated	
Washington D.C. Area Film Critics Association	December 8, 2024	Best Adapted Screenplay	Clint Bentley, Greg Kwedar	Nominated	
Washington D.C. Area Film Critics Association	December 8, 2024	Best Acting Ensemble	Sing Sing	Nominated	
