= 2024 Seattle Film Critics Society Awards =

American film awards

9th Seattle Film Critics Society Awards
- Date: December 16, 2024
- Site: Seattle, Washington

Highlights
- Best Picture: The Substance
- Most awards: Anora (4)
- Most nominations: Dune: Part Two (10); Furiosa: A Mad Max Saga (10)

The 9th Seattle Film Critics Society Awards recognized the best in film of 2024. The winners were announced on December 16, 2024.

The nominations were announced on December 6, 2024. Denis Villeneuve's epic science fiction sequel Dune: Part Two and George Miller's post-apocalyptic prequel Furiosa: A Mad Max Saga led the nominations with ten each, followed by Brady Corbet's The Brutalist with nine. For the second consecutive year, the SFCS awarded Best Picture to a film directed by a woman (that being Coralie Fargeat's The Substance). (Note: "For the second year in a row, we chose a film directed by a woman, the visually audacious, yet heartbreaking Cannes sensation The Substance, as Best Picture," noted SFCS President Kathy Fennessy. "It's also the first time body horror has taken the top spot, while the rest of our winners spanned genres and cultures, from a blockbuster American musical to a devastating Palestinian-Israeli documentary.")

The Seattle Film Critics Society previously announced the nominations for "Achievement in Pacific Northwest Filmmaking" on November 1; the nominees were all screened at SIFF Film Center from December 6 to 8. Additionally, the SFCS recognized two local filmmakers, Megan Leonard and Carlos A.F. Lopez, with a "Special Citation" for their "outstanding work".

== Winners and nominees ==
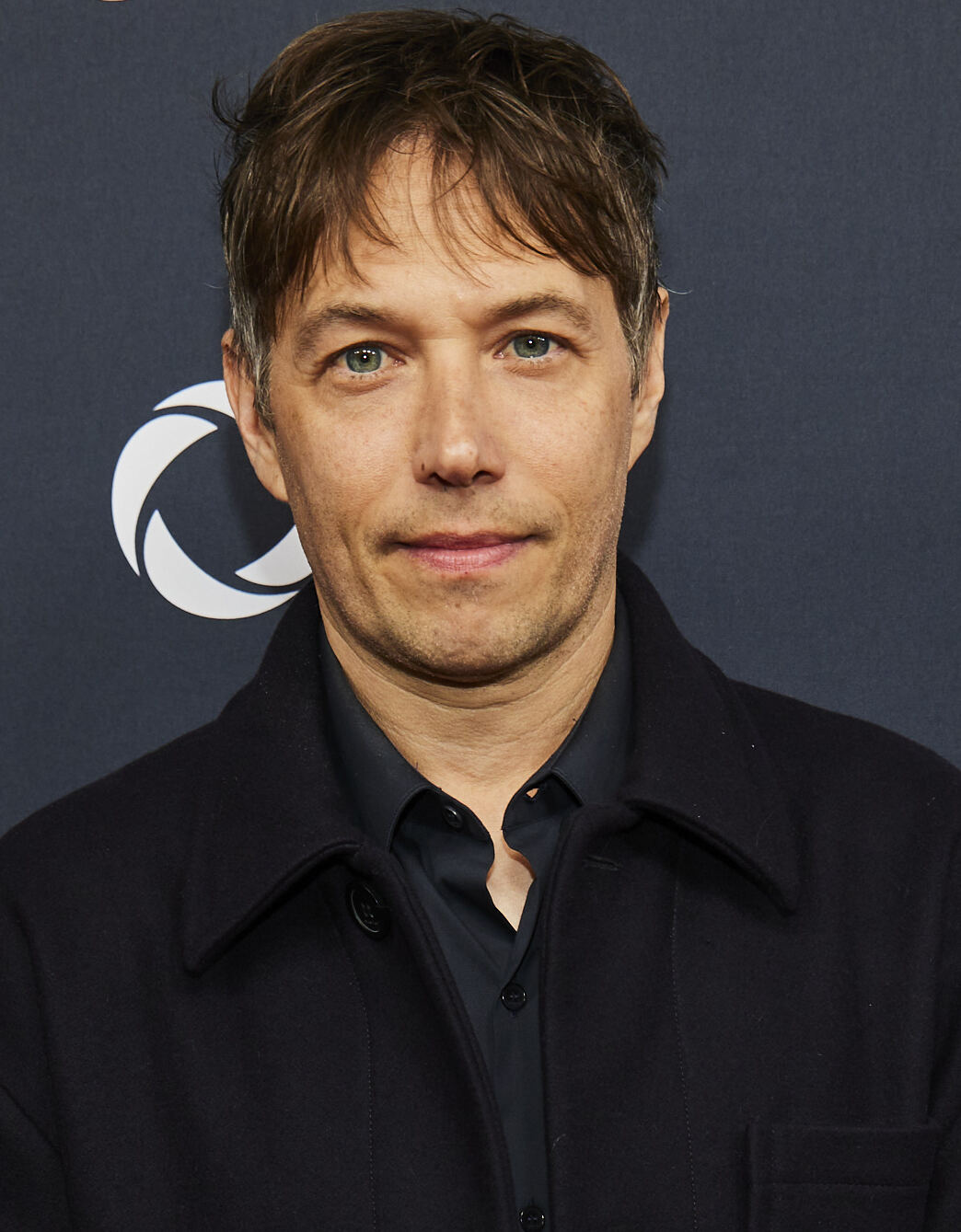
Sean Baker, Best Director and Best Screenplay winner

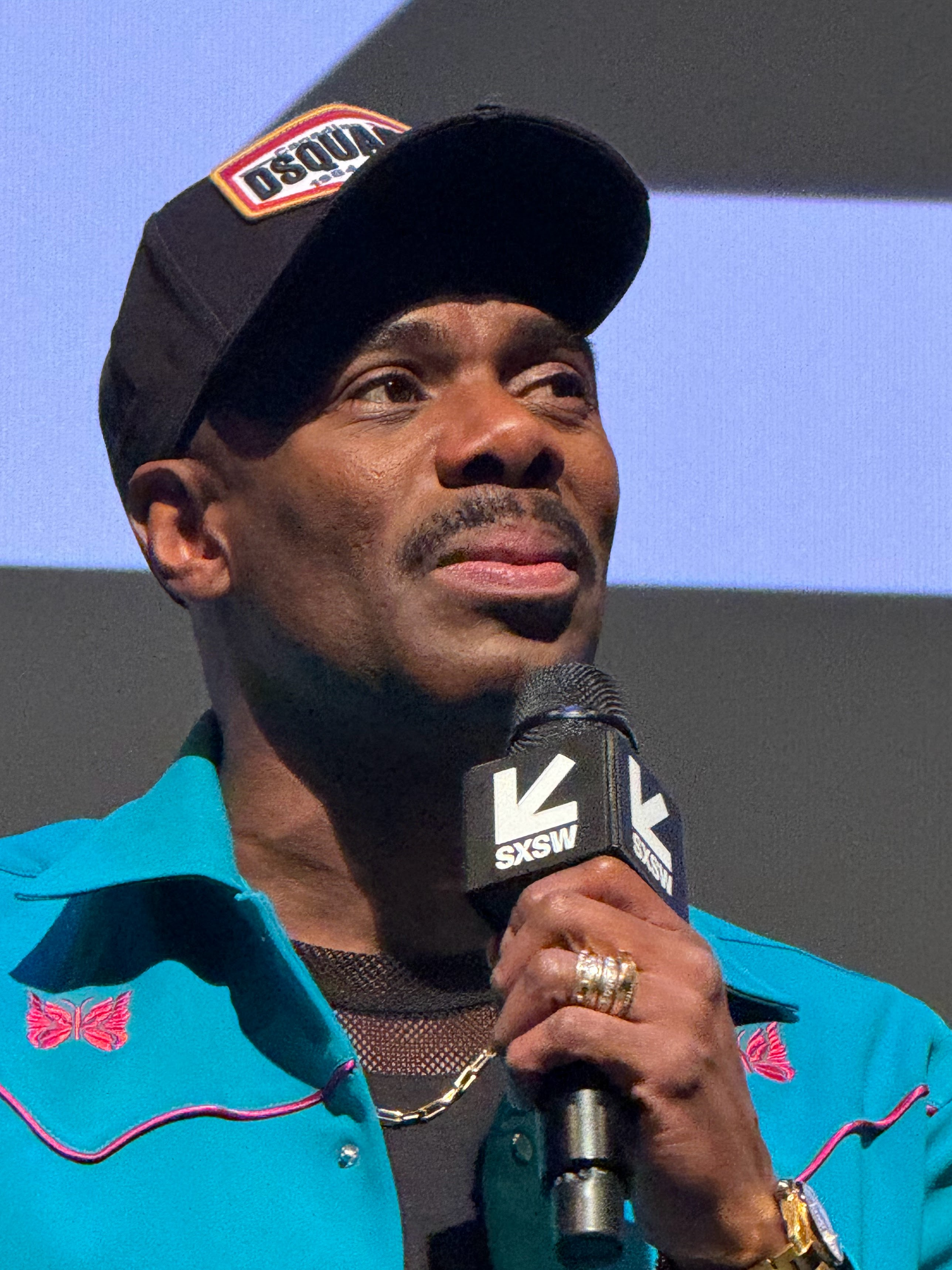
Colman Domingo, Best Lead Actor winner

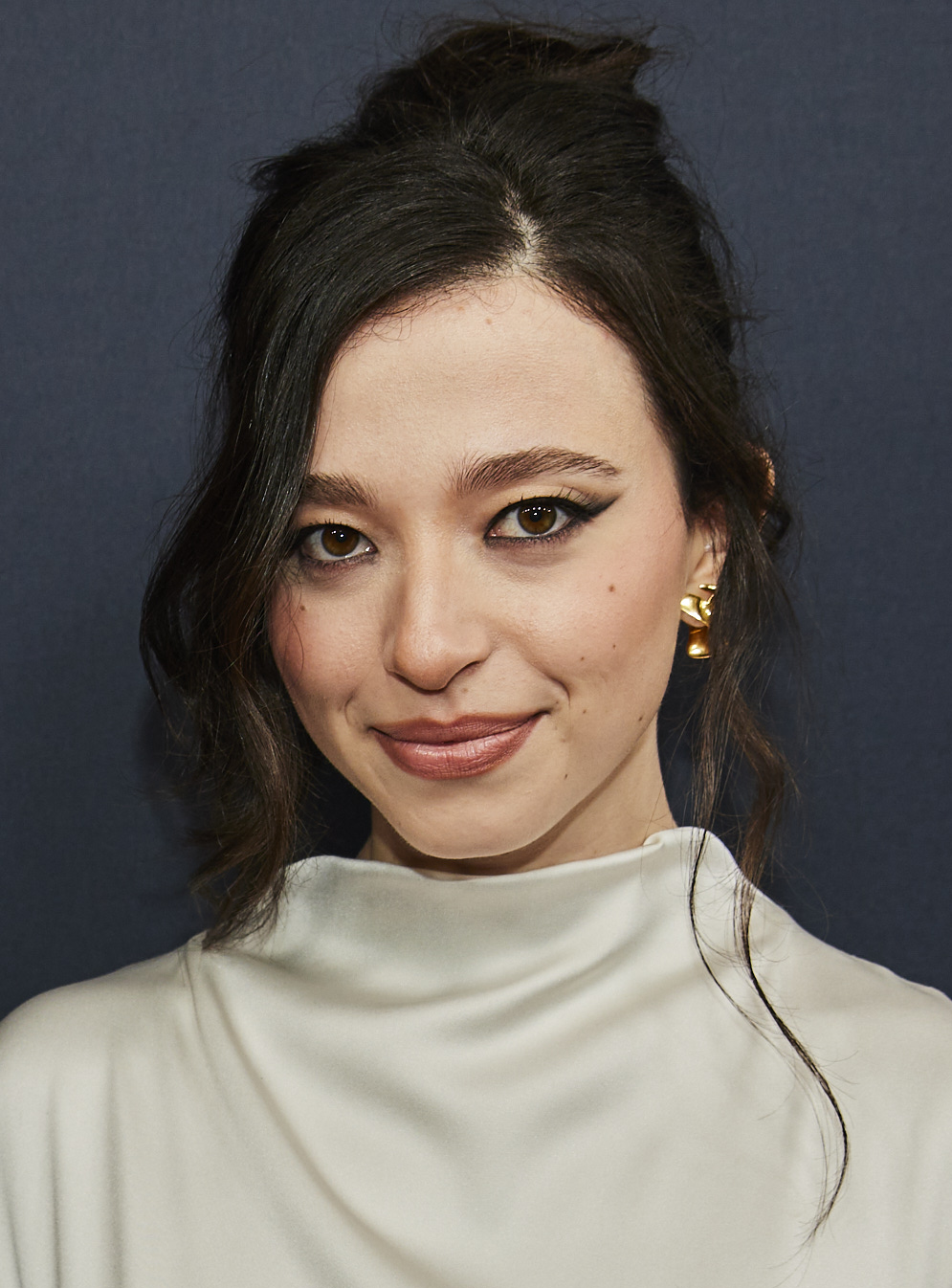
Mikey Madison, Best Lead Actress winner

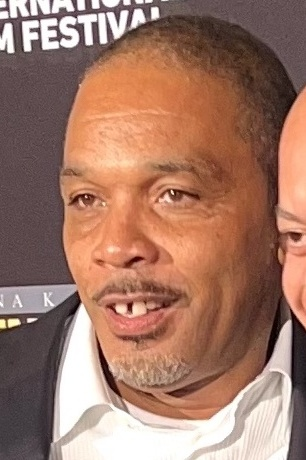
Clarence Maclin, Best Supporting Actor winner

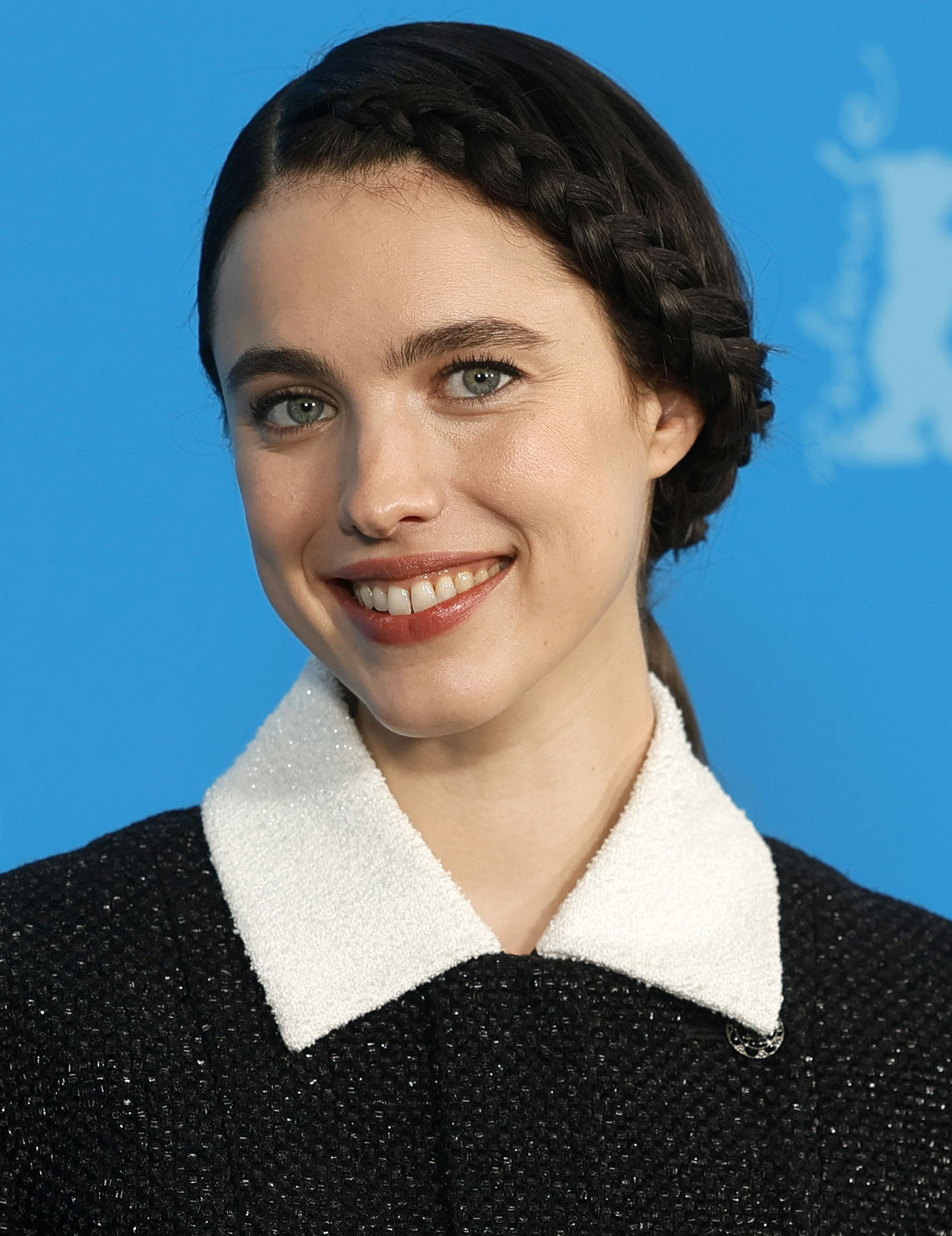
Margaret Qualley, Best Supporting Actress winner

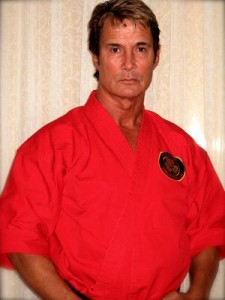
Richard Norton, Best Action Choreography co-winner

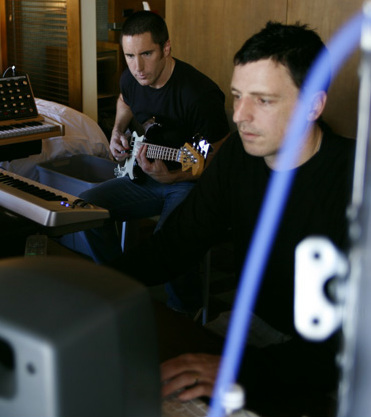
Trent Reznor and Atticus Ross, Best Original Score winners

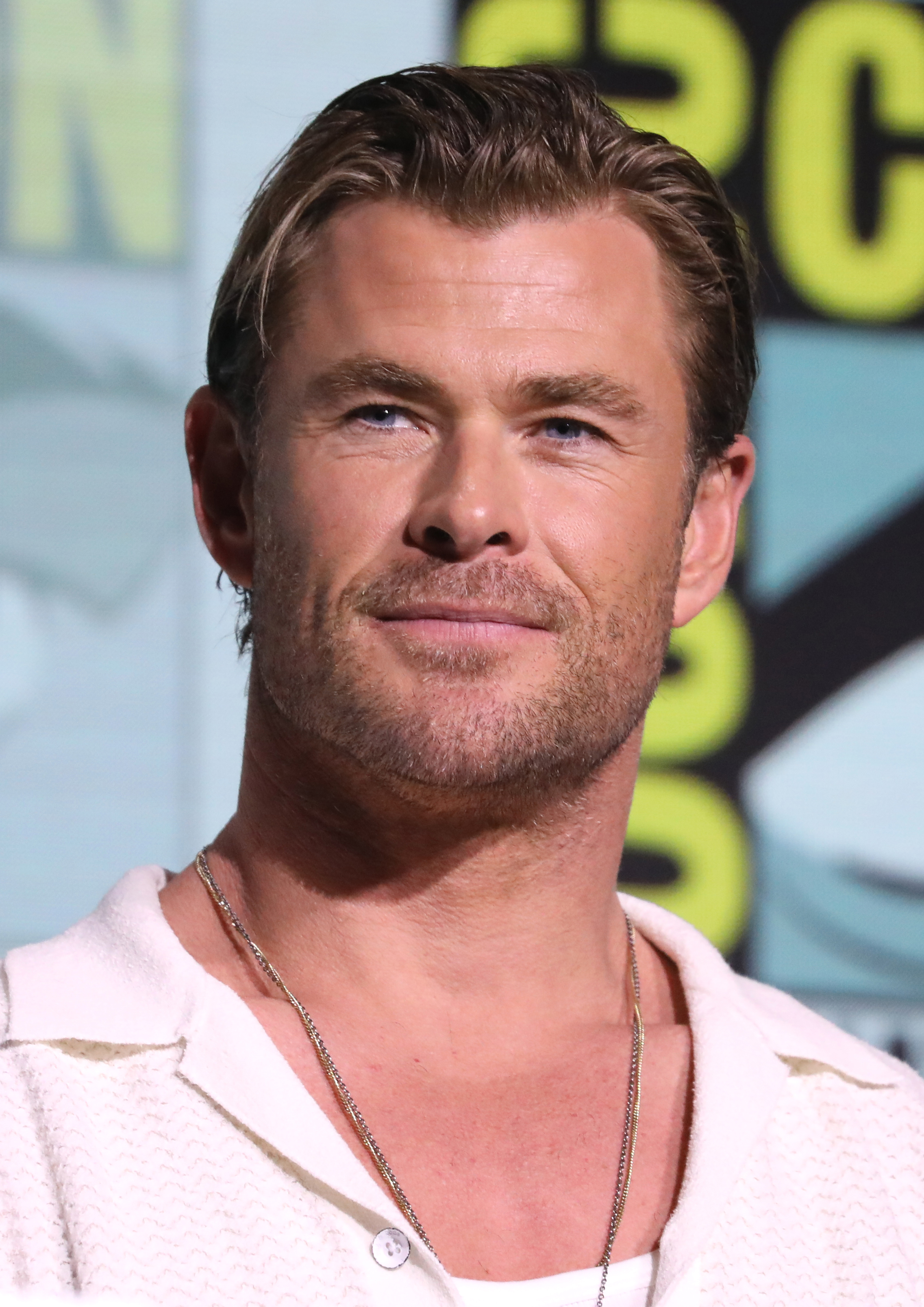
Chris Hemsworth, Villain of the Year winner

Winners are listed first and highlighted in bold

**Best Picture**: **The Substance**; Anora; The Beast; The Brutalist; Challengers; Conclave; Dune: Part Two; Furiosa: A Mad Max Saga; I Saw the TV Glow; Sing Sing	**Best Director**: **Sean Baker – Anora**; Bertrand Bonello – The Beast; Brady Corbet – The Brutalist; Coralie Fargeat – The Substance; Denis Villeneuve – Dune: Part Two
**Best Lead Actor**: **Colman Domingo – Sing Sing as John "Divine G" Whitfield**; Adrien Brody – The Brutalist as László Tóth; Ralph Fiennes – Conclave as Cardinal Thomas Lawrence; Keith Kupferer – Ghostlight as Dan Mueller; George MacKay – The Beast as Louis	**Best Lead Actress**: **Mikey Madison – Anora as Anora "Ani" Mikheeva**; Cynthia Erivo – Wicked as Elphaba Thropp; Marianne Jean-Baptiste – Hard Truths as Pansy Deacon; Demi Moore – The Substance as Elisabeth Sparkle; Léa Seydoux – The Beast as Gabrielle
**Best Supporting Actor**: **Clarence Maclin – Sing Sing as Himself**; Kieran Culkin – A Real Pain as Benji Kaplan; Chris Hemsworth – Furiosa: A Mad Max Saga as Dementus; Josh O'Connor – Challengers as Art Donaldson; Guy Pearce – The Brutalist as Harrison Lee Van Buren Sr.	**Best Supporting Actress**: **Margaret Qualley – The Substance as Sue**; Joan Chen – Dìdi as Chungsing Wang; Danielle Deadwyler – The Piano Lesson as Berniece Charles; Ariana Grande – Wicked as Galinda Upland; Isabella Rossellini – Conclave as Sister Agnes
**Best Ensemble**: **Anora – Sean Baker (casting director)**; Conclave – Nina Gold and Martin Ware (casting directors); Dune: Part Two – Dixie Chassay and Francine Maisler (casting directors); His Three Daughters – Nicole Arbusto (casting director); Sing Sing – Greg Kwedar (casting director)	**Best Action Choreography**: **Furiosa: A Mad Max Saga – Tim Wong and Richard Norton**; Dune: Part Two – Lee Morrison and Roger Yuan; The Fall Guy – Chris O'Hara, Keir Beck, and Jonathan Eusebio; Monkey Man – Udeh Nans and Brahim Achabbakhe; Twilight of the Warriors: Walled In – Kenji Tanigaki
**Best Screenplay**: **Anora – Sean Baker**; The Brutalist – Brady Corbet and Mona Fastvold; Conclave – Peter Straughan; A Real Pain – Jesse Eisenberg; The Substance – Coralie Fargeat	**Best Animated Film**: **The Wild Robot – Chris Sanders**; Flow – Gints Zilbalodis; Inside Out 2 – Kelsey Mann; Transformers One – Josh Cooley; Wallace & Gromit: Vengeance Most Fowl – Merlin Crossingham and Nick Park
**Best Documentary Film**: **No Other Land – Basel Adra, Hamdan Ballal, Yuval Abraham, and Rachel Szor**; Dahomey – Mati Diop; Sugarcane – Julian Brave NoiseCat and Emily Kassie; Super/Man: The Christopher Reeve Story – Ian Bonhôte and Peter Ettedgui; Will & Harper – Josh Greenbaum	**Best International Film**: **Evil Does Not Exist (Japan)**; The Beast (France); Flow (Latvia); Red Rooms (Canada); The Seed of the Sacred Fig (Germany / Iran)
**Best Cinematography**: **Nickel Boys – Jomo Fray**; The Brutalist – Lol Crawley; Dune: Part Two – Greig Fraser; Furiosa: A Mad Max Saga – Simon Duggan; Nosferatu – Jarin Blaschke	**Best Costume Design**: **Wicked – Paul Tazewell**; Conclave – Lisy Christl; Dune: Part Two – Jacqueline West; Furiosa: A Mad Max Saga – Jenny Beavan; Nosferatu – Linda Muir
**Best Film Editing**: **Furiosa: A Mad Max Saga – Eliot Knapman and Margaret Sixel**; Anora – Sean Baker; The Brutalist – Dávid Jancsó; Dune: Part Two – Joe Walker; The Substance – Coralie Fargeat, Jérôme Eltabet, and Valentin Feron	**Best Original Score**: **Challengers – Trent Reznor and Atticus Ross**; The Brutalist – Daniel Blumberg; Conclave – Volker Bertelmann; Evil Does Not Exist – Eiko Ishibashi; The Wild Robot – Kris Bowers
**Best Production Design**: **The Brutalist – Judy Becker and Patricia Cuccia**; Conclave – Suzie Davies and Cynthia Sleiter; Dune: Part Two – Patrice Vermette and Shane Vieau; Furiosa: A Mad Max Saga – Colin Gibson and Katie Sharrock; Wicked – Nathan Crowley and Lee Sandales	**Best Visual Effects**: **Dune: Part Two – Paul Lambert, Stephen James, and Rhys Salcombe**; Furiosa: A Mad Max Saga – Andrew Jackson and Dan Bethell; Kingdom of the Planet of the Apes – Erik Winquist and Sean Noel Walker; The Substance – Bryan Jones and Guillaume Le Gouez; Wicked – Anthony Smith, Jonathan Fawkner, Pablo Helman, and Robert Weaver
**Best Youth Performance**: **Izaac Wang – Dìdi as Chris "Dìdi" Wang**; Alyla Browne – Furiosa: A Mad Max Saga as Young Furiosa; Katherine Mallen Kupferer – Ghostlight as Daisy Mueller; Alisha Weir – Abigail as Abigail; Zoe Ziegler – Janet Planet as Lacy	**Villain of the Year**: **Dementus – Furiosa: A Mad Max Saga (as portrayed by Chris Hemsworth)**; Count Orlok – Nosferatu (as portrayed by Bill Skarsgård); Feyd-Rautha Harkonnen – Dune: Part Two (as portrayed by Austin Butler); Longlegs – Longlegs (as portrayed by Nicolas Cage); Macrinus – Gladiator II (as portrayed by Denzel Washington)
**Achievement in Pacific Northwest Filmmaking**: **Rainier: A Beer Odyssey – Isaac Olsen**; All We Carry – Cady Voge; Fish War – Jeff Ostenson, Charles Atkinson, and Skylar Wagner; Gasoline Rainbow – Bill Ross IV and Turner Ross; Strange Darling – JT Mollner
