= Austin Film Critics Association Awards 2024 =

Film awards edition

20th Austin Film Critics Association Awards
- Date: January 6, 2025
- Location: Austin, Texas
- Presented by: Austin Film Critics Association
- Website: austinfilmcritics.org

The 20th Austin Film Critics Association Awards, honoring the best in filmmaking for 2024, were announced on January 6, 2025. The nominations were announced on December 27, 2024.

== Statistics ==
Brady Corbet's epic drama The Brutalist led the nominations with ten, followed by Dune: Part Two with eight, and Anora and The Substance with seven each. Unlike previous editions of the awards were five nominees while one winner was presented for the Robert R. "Bobby" McCurdy Memorial Breakthrough Artist Award; this year, the award went to all five top nominees.

Anora received the most awards with five, including Best Film, followed by Sing Sing with four.

== Winners and nominees ==
The winners are listed first and in bold

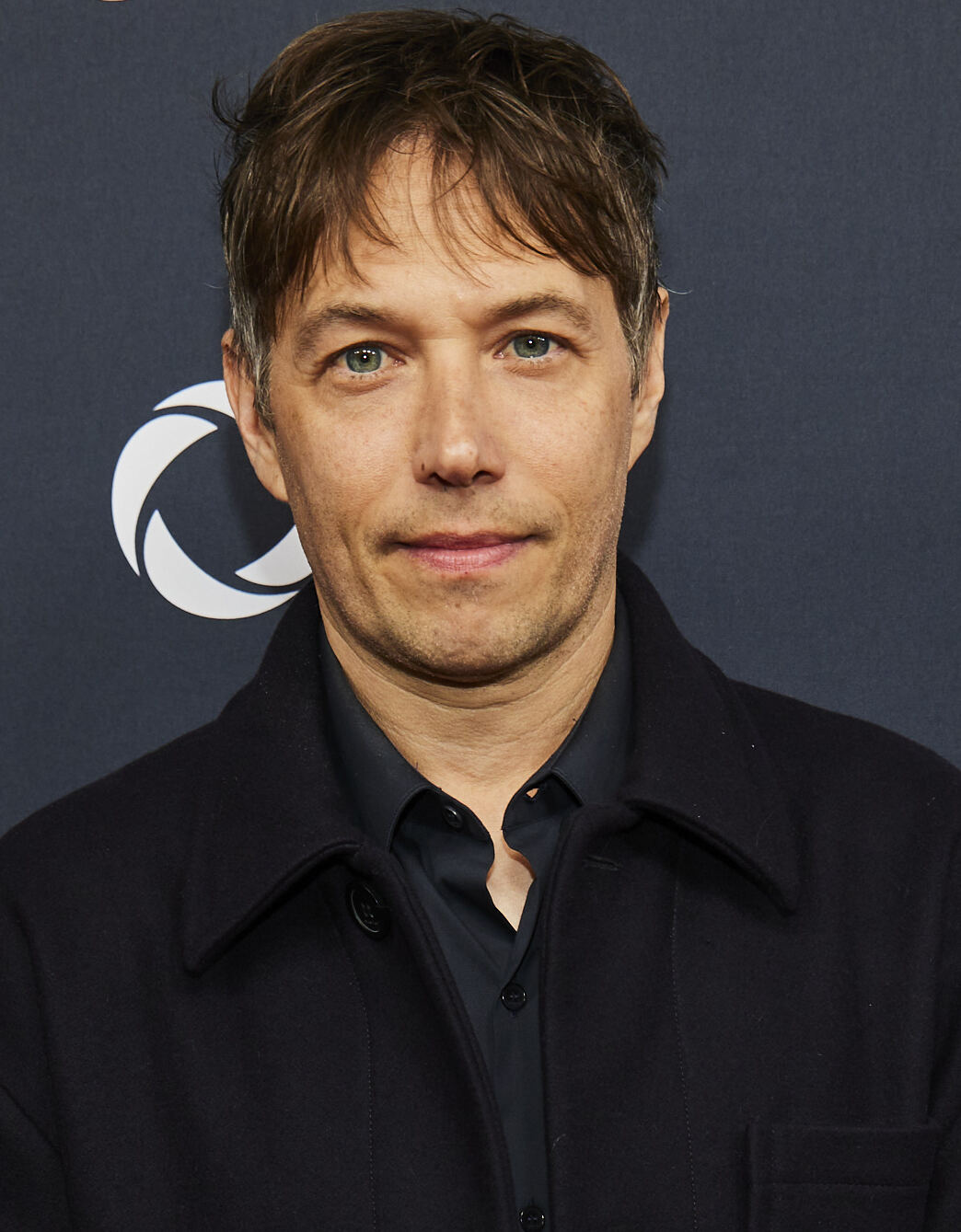
Sean Baker, Best Director and Best Original Screenplay winner

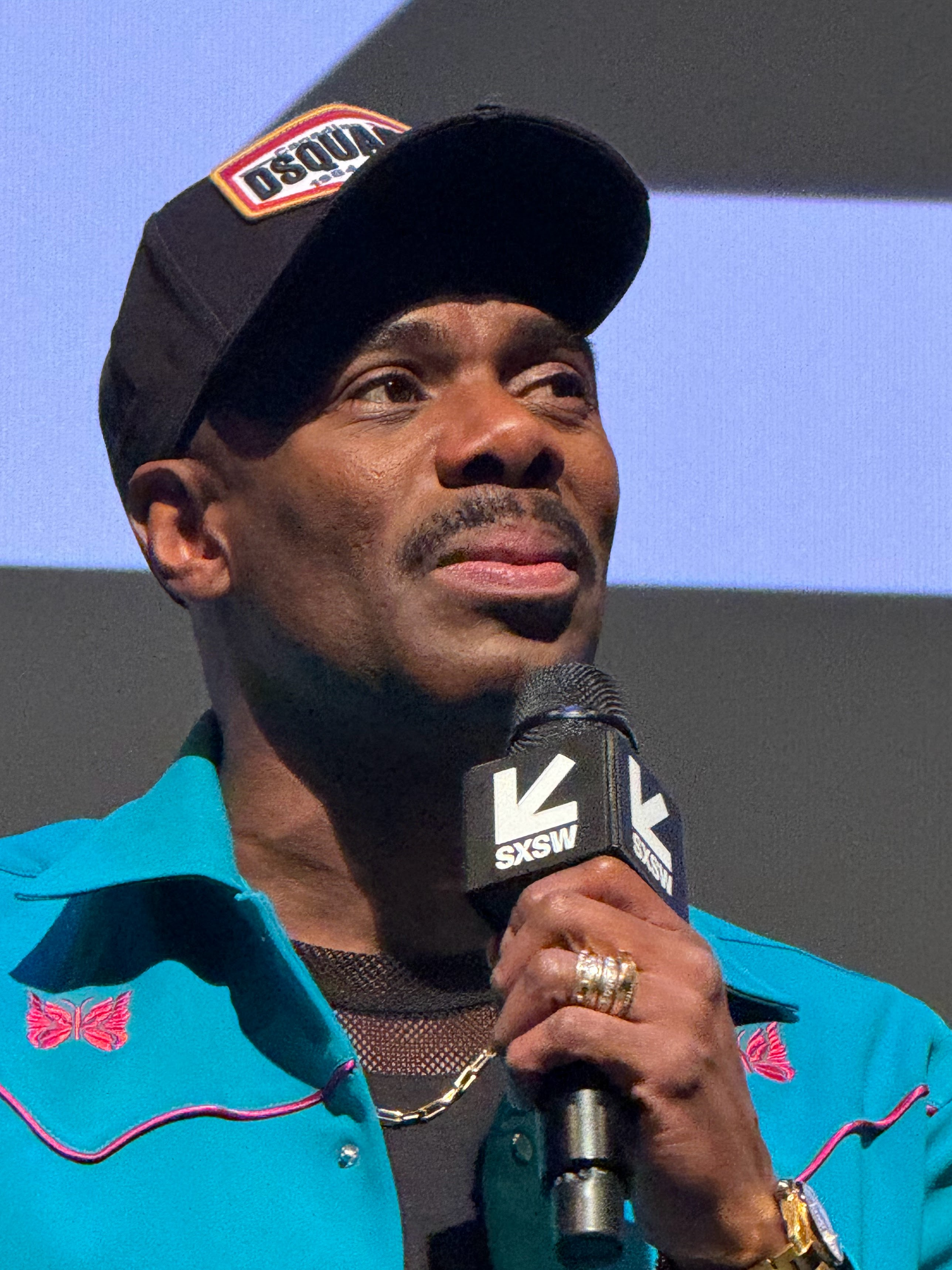
Colman Domingo, Best Actor winner

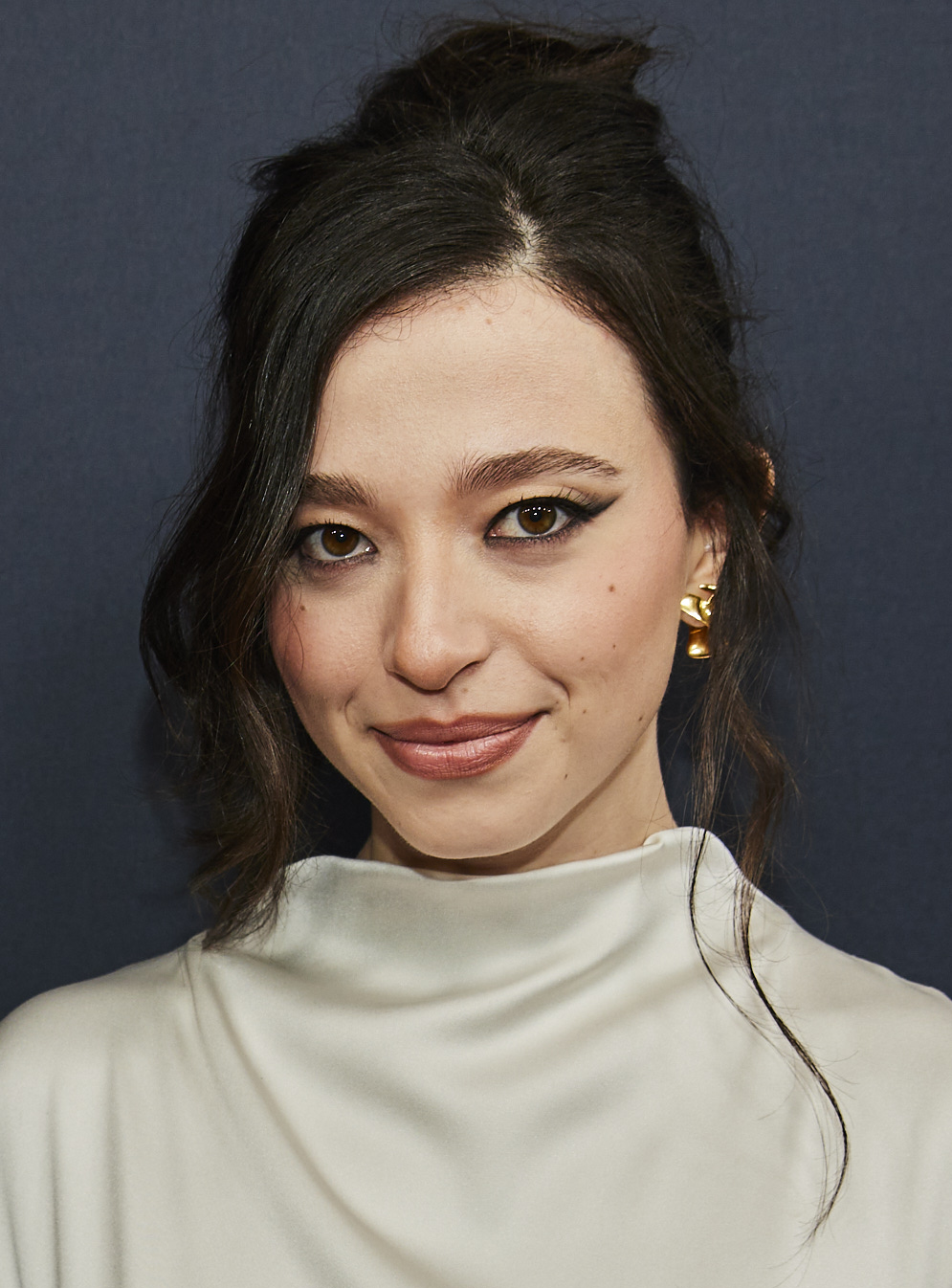
Mikey Madison, Best Actress winner and Robert R. "Bobby" McCurdy Memorial Breakthrough Artist Award co-recipient

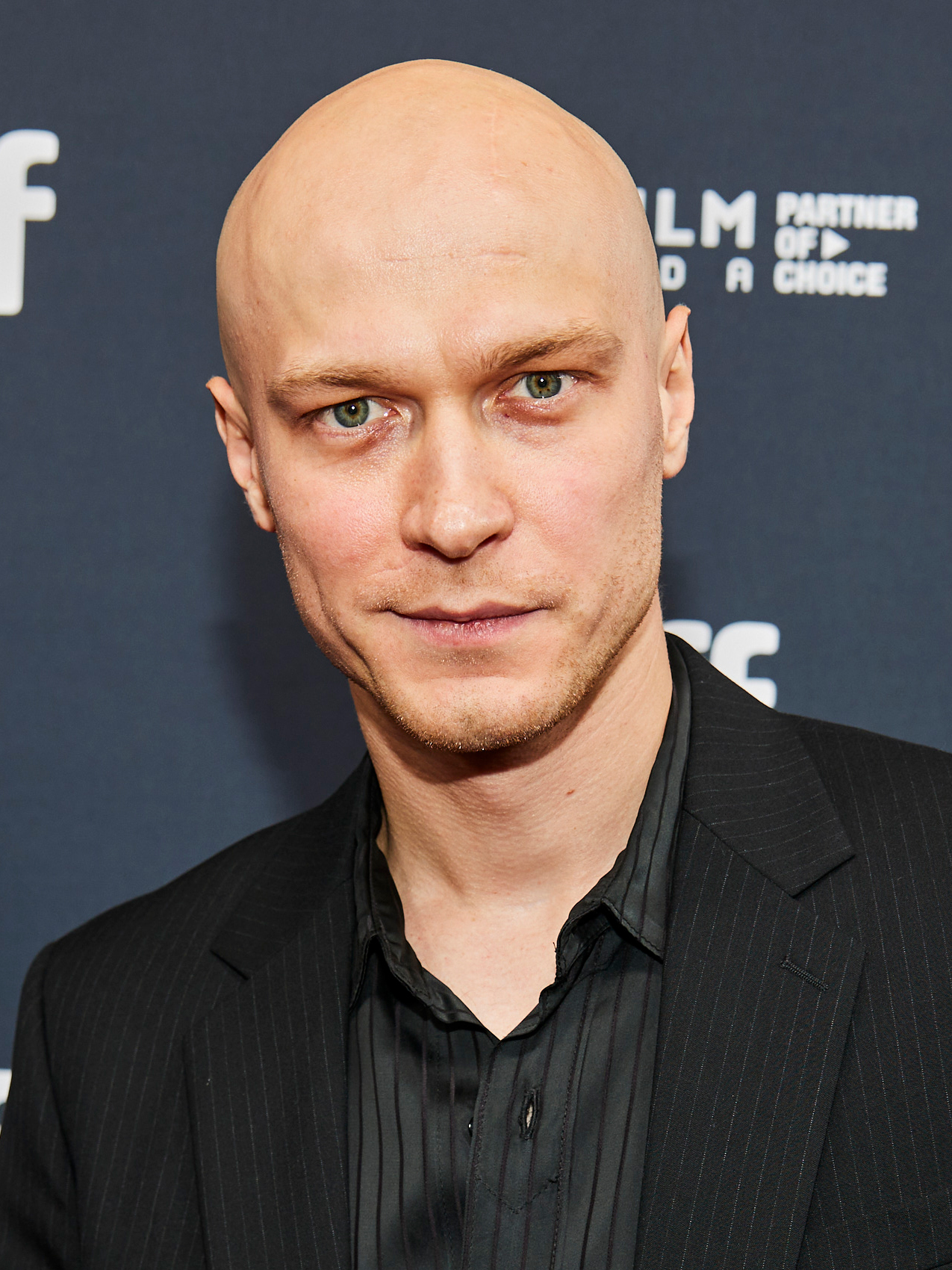
Yura Borisov, Best Supporting Actor winner

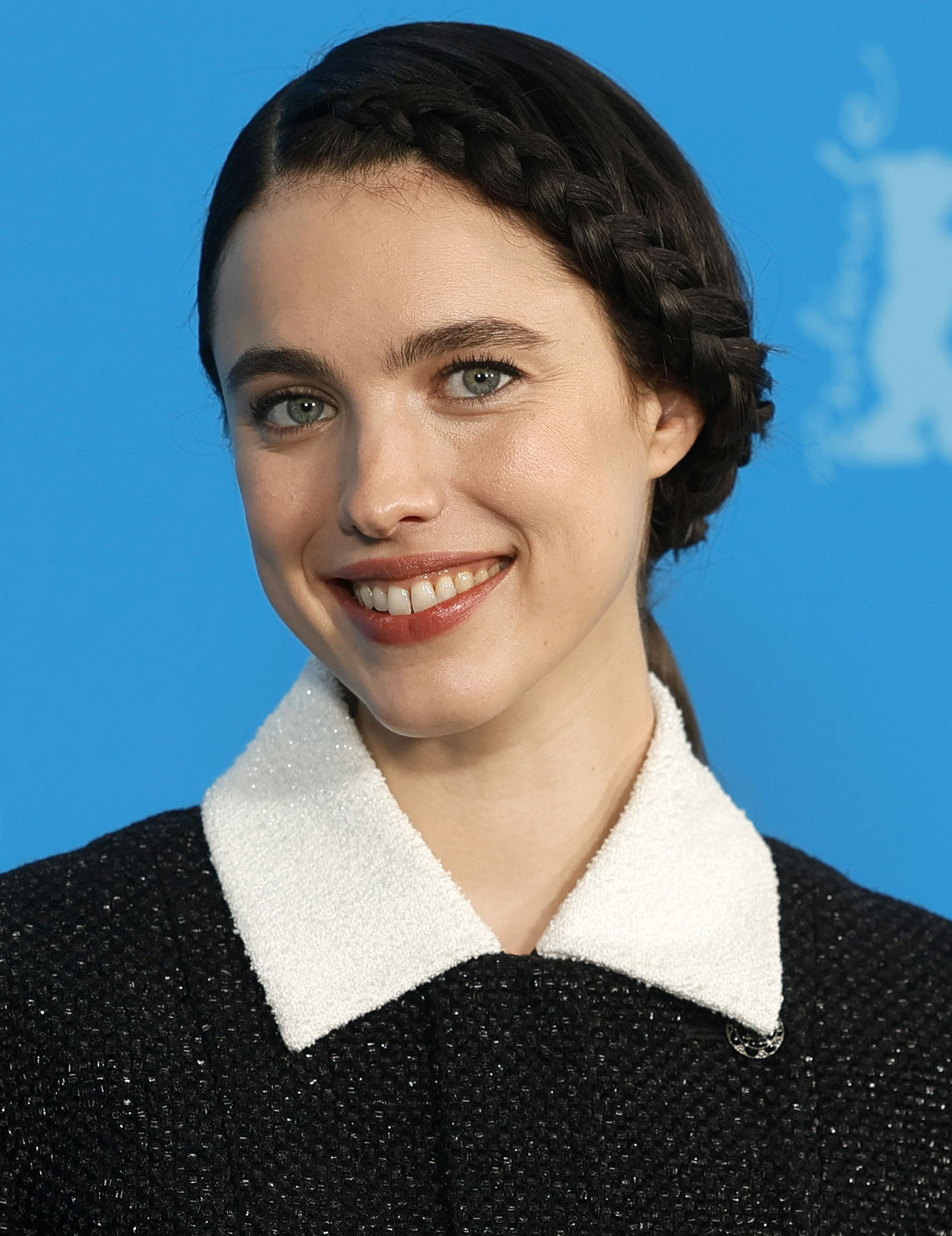
Margaret Qualley, Best Supporting Actress winner

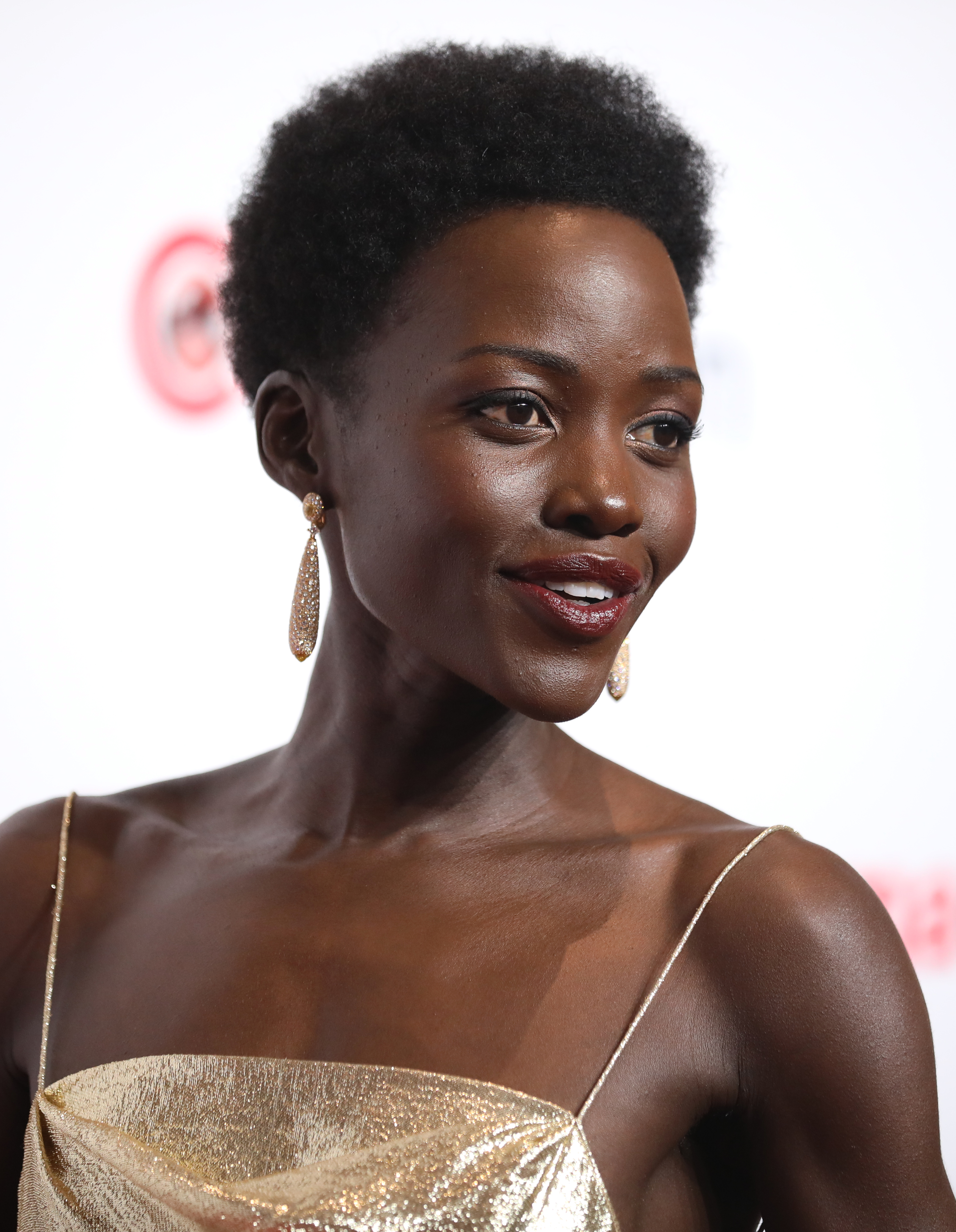
Lupita Nyong'o, Best Voice Acting/Animated/Digital Performance winner

Best Film	Best Director
1. **Anora**; 2. The Brutalist; 3. The Substance; 4. Sing Sing; 5. Love Lies Bleeding; 6. Nickel Boys; 7. Dune: Part Two; 8. Nosferatu; 9. Conclave; 10. Wicked	**Sean Baker – Anora**; Brady Corbet – The Brutalist; Coralie Fargeat – The Substance; Rose Glass – Love Lies Bleeding; Denis Villeneuve – Dune: Part Two
Best Actor	Best Actress
**Colman Domingo – Sing Sing as John "Divine G" Whitfield**; Adrien Brody – The Brutalist as László Tóth; Daniel Craig – Queer as William Lee; Ralph Fiennes – Conclave as Cardinal Thomas Lawrence; Hugh Grant – Heretic as Mr. Reed	**Mikey Madison – Anora as Anora "Ani" Mikheeva**; Pamela Anderson – The Last Showgirl as Shelly Gardner; Marianne Jean-Baptiste – Hard Truths as Pansy Deacon; Nicole Kidman – Babygirl as Romy Mathis; Demi Moore – The Substance as Elisabeth Sparkle
Best Supporting Actor	Best Supporting Actress
**Yura Borisov – Anora as Igor**; Kieran Culkin – A Real Pain as Benji Kaplan; Clarence Maclin – Sing Sing as Clarence "Divine Eye" Maclin; Guy Pearce – The Brutalist as Harrison Lee Van Buren Sr.; Jeremy Strong – The Apprentice as Roy Cohn	**Margaret Qualley – The Substance as Sue**; Danielle Deadwyler – The Piano Lesson as Berniece; Ariana Grande – Wicked as Galinda Upland; Felicity Jones – The Brutalist as Erzsébet Tóth; Katy O'Brian – Love Lies Bleeding as Jacqueline "Jackie" Cleaver
Best Adapted Screenplay	Best Original Screenplay
**Sing Sing – Greg Kwedar and Clint Bentley**; Conclave – Peter Straughan; Dune: Part Two – Denis Villeneuve and Jon Spaihts; Nickel Boys – RaMell Ross and Joslyn Barnes; Wicked – Winnie Holzman and Dana Fox	**Anora – Sean Baker**; The Brutalist – Brady Corbet and Mona Fastvold; Challengers – Justin Kuritzkes; A Real Pain – Jesse Eisenberg; The Substance – Coralie Fargeat
Best Animated Film	Best Documentary
**The Wild Robot**; Flow; Inside Out 2; Memoir of a Snail; Wallace & Gromit: Vengeance Most Fowl	**Will & Harper**; Dahomey; No Other Land; The Remarkable Life of Ibelin; Super/Man: The Christopher Reeve Story
Best International Film	Best First Film
**The Seed of the Sacred Fig**; Emilia Pérez; Flow; I'm Still Here; Kneecap	**The First Omen – Arkasha Stevenson**; Blink Twice – Zoë Kravitz; Dìdi – Sean Wang; The People's Joker – Vera Drew; Thelma – Josh Margolin
Best Cinematography	Best Editing
**The Brutalist – Lol Crawley**; Dune: Part Two – Greig Fraser; Nickel Boys – Jomo Fray; Nosferatu – Jarin Blaschke; The Substance – Benjamin Kračun	**The Substance – Coralie Fargeat, Jérôme Eltabet, and Valentin Féron**; Anora – Sean Baker; The Brutalist – Dávid Jancsó; Dune: Part Two – Joe Walker; September 5 – Hansjörg Weißbrich
Best Original Score	Best Ensemble
**The Brutalist – Daniel Blumberg**; Challengers – Trent Reznor and Atticus Ross; Dune: Part Two – Hans Zimmer; Nosferatu – Robin Carolan; The Wild Robot – Kris Bowers	**Sing Sing**; Anora; The Brutalist; Conclave; Dune: Part Two
Best Stunt Work	Best Voice Acting/Animated/Digital Performance
**The Fall Guy**; Dune: Part Two; Furiosa: A Mad Max Saga; Kill; Monkey Man	**Lupita Nyong'o – The Wild Robot as Roz / Rummage**; Kevin Durand – Kingdom of the Planet of the Apes as Proximus Caesar; Amy Poehler – Inside Out 2 as Joy; Sarah Snook – Memoir of a Snail as Grace Pudel; Robbie Williams / Jonno Davies – Better Man as Robbie Williams / Young Robbie Williams
The Robert R. "Bobby" McCurdy Memorial Breakthrough Artist Award	Best Austin Film 2024
**Vera Drew – The People's Joker**; **Clarence Maclin – Sing Sing**; **Mikey Madison – Anora**; **Katy O'Brian – Love Lies Bleeding**; **Aaron Pierre – Rebel Ridge**	**Sing Sing (dir. Greg Kwedar)**; The Bikeriders (dir. Jeff Nichols); Fugitive Dreams (dir. Jason Neulander); Hit Man (dir. Richard Linklater); Sasquatch Sunset (dir. Nathan and David Zellner)
