= Hard Truths =

2024 film by Mike Leigh

- Theatrical release poster
- Directed by: Mike Leigh
- Written by: Mike Leigh
- Produced by: Georgina Lowe
- Starring: Marianne Jean-Baptiste; Michele Austin; David Webber; Tuwaine Barrett; Ani Nelson; Sophia Brown; Jonathan Livingstone
- Cinematography: Dick Pope
- Edited by: Tania Reddin
- Music by: Gary Yershon
- Production companies: Film4; Thin Man Films; The Mediapro Studio; Creativity Media
- Distributed by: StudioCanal (United Kingdom); BTeam Pictures (Spain)
- Release dates: 6 September 2024 (TIFF); 31 January 2025 (United Kingdom); 28 February 2025 (Spain)
- Running time: 97 minutes
- Countries: United Kingdom; Spain
- Language: English
- Box office: $2.8 million

Hard Truths is a 2024 drama film written and directed by Mike Leigh, starring Marianne Jean-Baptiste, Michele Austin, and David Webber. Set in London, its plot follows the plight of a depressed and nay-saying woman (Jean-Baptiste) and the relationship with her jovial sister Chantelle (Austin).

The film premiered at the 49th Toronto International Film Festival on 6 September 2024, and was met with widespread critical acclaim for its screenplay, direction and Jean-Baptiste's performance. It was released theatrically in the United States on 6 December 2024, by Bleecker Street, in the United Kingdom on 31 January 2025 by StudioCanal, and in Spain on 28 February 2025 by BTeam Pictures. It was named one of the top 10 independent films of 2024 by the National Board of Review. Meanwhile, for her performance, Jean-Baptiste received Best Actress nominations at the Critics' Choice Awards, BAFTA Film Awards, and the Gotham Awards, and swept the Best Actress trifecta at the NYFCC, LAFCA, and NSFC, becoming the first woman of colour to do so.

== Plot ==
Pansy Deacon is a depressed and anxious woman who lives with her meek plumber husband Curtley and her layabout adult son Moses, the latter of whom she constantly chastises for his lack of aspirations. Her short temper causes her to argue with and criticize everyone she meets, whether they be her family or strangers, and her anxiety is so severe that she loathes going outside and is disgusted by animals and flowers. Her sister Chantelle, a single hairdresser with two adult daughters, continually presses her to come to their mother Pearl's grave on Mother's Day for the fifth anniversary of her death, which she hesitates to do.

After spending the days leading up to the anniversary getting into fights with strangers, Pansy goes with Chantelle to the grave, where she insists that Pearl gave Chantelle preferential treatment and put undeserved pressure on her after their father left them. As Chantelle denies the former claim, Pansy admits her fear that her family hates her, and Chantelle comforts her, promising that she loves her despite her issues.

The sisters go to Chantelle's flat for a Mother's Day celebration with their families, where Pansy, convinced that her fears about her family are true, is morose and silent. Chantelle pulls her aside and she admits that she married Curtley out of desperation but is unable to bring herself to divorce him, leaving her isolated and lonely. Returning to the party, she learns that Moses bought her flowers as a gift, contradicting her earlier belief that he would do nothing for Mother's Day. Pansy laughs hysterically before breaking down sobbing, thanking her son through tears.

When the Deacons return home, Pansy anxiously puts the flowers in a vase and leaves the patio door open, but after she leaves, Curtley throws them outside and shuts the door. The next day, he injures his back on the job and sends his coworker to wake Pansy, who becomes so anxious when he enters her bedroom that she cannot go downstairs. As a young woman approaches Moses while he is out on a walk, Curtley silently weeps downstairs while Pansy remains in her bedroom.

== Cast ==
- Marianne Jean-Baptiste as Pansy Deacon
- Michele Austin as Chantelle Montgomery
- David Webber as Curtley Deacon
- Tuwaine Barrett as Moses Deacon
- Ani Nelson as Kayla
- Sophia Brown as Aleisha
- Jonathan Livingstone as Virgil
- Samantha Spiro as Nicole

== Production ==
In February 2020, it was reported that Mike Leigh would begin shooting his latest film in the summer. After a delay due to the COVID-19 pandemic, it was announced in February 2023 that the film would go into production that year. In February 2024, it was reported that the film would star Marianne Jean-Baptiste and Michele Austin. Jean-Baptiste and Austin had previously collaborated with Leigh in Secrets & Lies.

== Release ==
Hard Truths premiered in the Special Presentations section of the 2024 Toronto International Film Festival on 6 September 2024. It also screened at the 72nd San Sebastián International Film Festival and the 2024 New York Film Festival. The film had its United Kingdom premiere at the London Film Festival on 14 October 2024. In the United Kingdom, StudioCanal released the film on 31 January 2025. In Spain, BTeam Pictures will release the film on 28 February 2025. In the United States, Bleecker Street gave the film a limited theatrical release in New York on 6 December 2024, followed by a nationwide release on 10 January 2025. The film was rejected by Cannes and Venice, where Leigh had in previous years taken the top prize (the Palme d'Or and the Golden Lion, respectively), in addition to the Telluride Film Festival.

== Reception ==
=== Box office ===
The film has grossed $794,720 from the United Kingdom and $808,121 from the United States, for a worldwide total of $1.6 million.

=== Critical response ===
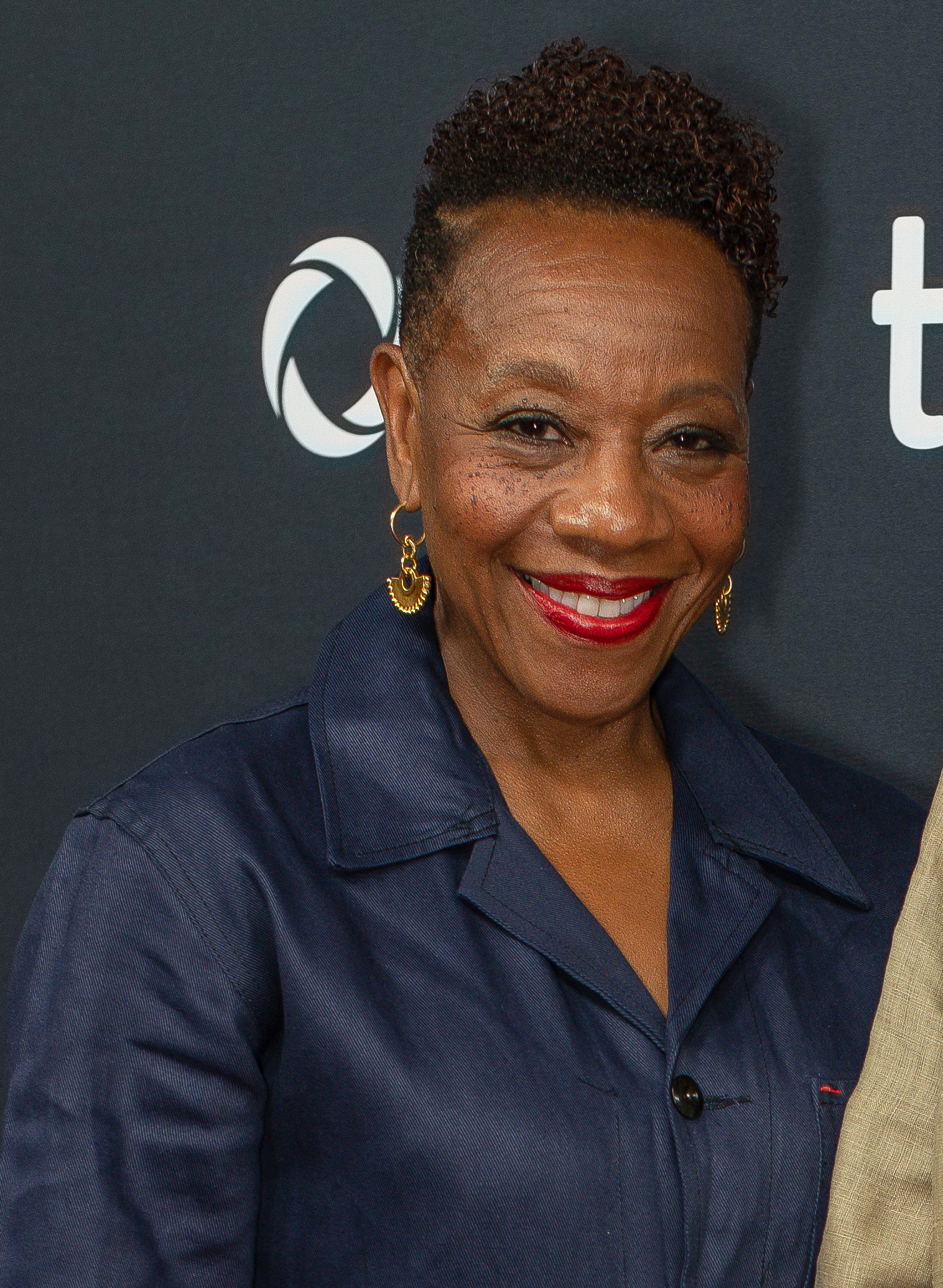
Marianne Jean-Baptiste received widespread praise for her performance.

On the review aggregator website Rotten Tomatoes, 95% of 103 critics' reviews are positive, with an average rating of 8.5/10. The website's consensus reads: "Marianne Jean-Baptiste puts on a prickly masterclass in Hard Truths, another superb character study from writer-director Mike Leigh." Metacritic, which uses a weighted average, assigned the film a score of 88 out of 100, based on 32 critics, indicating "universal acclaim".

Peter Bradshaw of The Guardian rated the film four out of five stars, describing it as "a deeply sober, sombre, compassionate drama about a black British family".

Filmmaker John Waters named it his fourth favorite film of 2024, calling it "A horribly sad and sometimes hilariously funny portrait of the most unpleasant sourpuss woman in the history of cinema. She's a rotten mother and a terrible wife, and everyone around her is racked with pain except the audience, which slowly begins to root for her. A wretched experience I'll cherish forever." Other filmmakers who praised the film include Joshua Oppenheimer, Pascal Plante and Nancy Savoca.

In June 2025, IndieWire ranked the film at number 67 on its list of "The 100 Best Movies of the 2020s (So Far)."

=== Accolades ===
Award	Date of ceremony	Category	Recipient(s)	Result	Ref.
San Sebastián International Film Festival	28 September 2024	Golden Seashell	Hard Truths	Nominated	
Denver Film Festival	10 November 2024	Excellence in Acting Award	Marianne Jean-Baptiste	Won	
Gotham Awards	2 December 2024	Outstanding Lead Performance	Marianne Jean-Baptiste	Nominated	
Gotham Awards	2 December 2024	Best International Feature	Mike Leigh, Georgina Lowe	Nominated	
New York Film Critics Circle	3 December 2024	Best Actress	Marianne Jean-Baptiste	Won	
National Board of Review	4 December 2024	Top 10 Independent Films	Hard Truths	Won (Note: This award does not have a single winner, but recognizes multiple films.)	
Los Angeles Film Critics Association	8 December 2024	Best Lead Performance	Marianne Jean-Baptiste	Won (Note: Since merging gendered categories for both lead and supporting, LAFCA has awarded two winners per category. Thus, Jean-Baptiste shared her win with Mikey Madison from Anora.)	
Washington D.C. Area Film Critics Association Awards	8 December 2024	Best Actress	Marianne Jean-Baptiste	Nominated	
British Independent Film Awards	8 December 2024	Best Lead Performance	Marianne Jean-Baptiste	Won	
British Independent Film Awards	8 December 2024	Best Supporting Performance	Michele Austin	Nominated	
San Diego Film Critics Society	9 December 2024	Best Actress	Marianne Jean-Baptiste	Won	
Chicago Film Critics Association	11 December 2024	Best Actress	Marianne Jean-Baptiste	Won	
St. Louis Film Critics Association	15 December 2024	Best Actress	Marianne Jean-Baptiste	Runner-up	
St. Louis Film Critics Association	15 December 2024	Original Screenplay	Mike Leigh	Runner-up	
San Francisco Bay Area Film Critics Circle	15 December 2024	Best Film	Hard Truths	Nominated	
San Francisco Bay Area Film Critics Circle	15 December 2024	Best Director	Mike Leigh	Nominated	
San Francisco Bay Area Film Critics Circle	15 December 2024	Best Actress	Marianne Jean-Baptiste	Won	
San Francisco Bay Area Film Critics Circle	15 December 2024	Best Original Screenplay	Mike Leigh	Nominated	
Toronto Film Critics Association	15 December 2024	Best Lead Performance	Marianne Jean-Baptiste	Won (Note: Shared with Mikey Madison from Anora)	
Seattle Film Critics Society	16 December 2024	Best Actress	Marianne Jean-Baptiste	Nominated	
New York Film Critics Online	16 December 2024	Best Actress	Marianne Jean-Baptiste	Runner-up	
Dallas–Fort Worth Film Critics Association	18 December 2024	Best Actress	Marianne Jean-Baptiste	5th place	
Florida Film Critics Circle	20 December 2024	Best Actress	Marianne Jean-Baptiste	Nominated	
Greater Western New York Film Critics Association	4 January 2025	Best Lead Actress	Marianne Jean-Baptiste	Won	
National Society of Film Critics	4 January 2025	Best Actress	Marianne Jean-Baptiste	Won	
National Society of Film Critics	4 January 2025	Best Supporting Actress	Michele Austin	Won	
Austin Film Critics Association	6 January 2025	Best Actress	Marianne Jean-Baptiste	Nominated	
Alliance of Women Film Journalists	7 January 2025	Best Actress	Marianne Jean-Baptiste	Won	
AARP Movies for Grownups Awards	11 January 2025	Best Actress	Marianne Jean-Baptiste	Nominated	
Critics' Choice Movie Awards	12 January 2025	Best Actress	Marianne Jean-Baptiste	Nominated	
Satellite Awards	26 January 2025	Best Original Screenplay	Mike Leigh	Nominated	
British Academy Film Awards	16 February 2025	Best Actress in a Leading Role	Marianne Jean-Baptiste	Nominated	
British Academy Film Awards	16 February 2025	Outstanding British Film	Hard Truths	Nominated	
Independent Spirit Awards	22 February 2025	Best International Film	Hard Truths	Nominated	

== See also ==
- List of Spanish films of 2025
