= Abraham Alexander (musician) =

American blues/soul/R&B musician

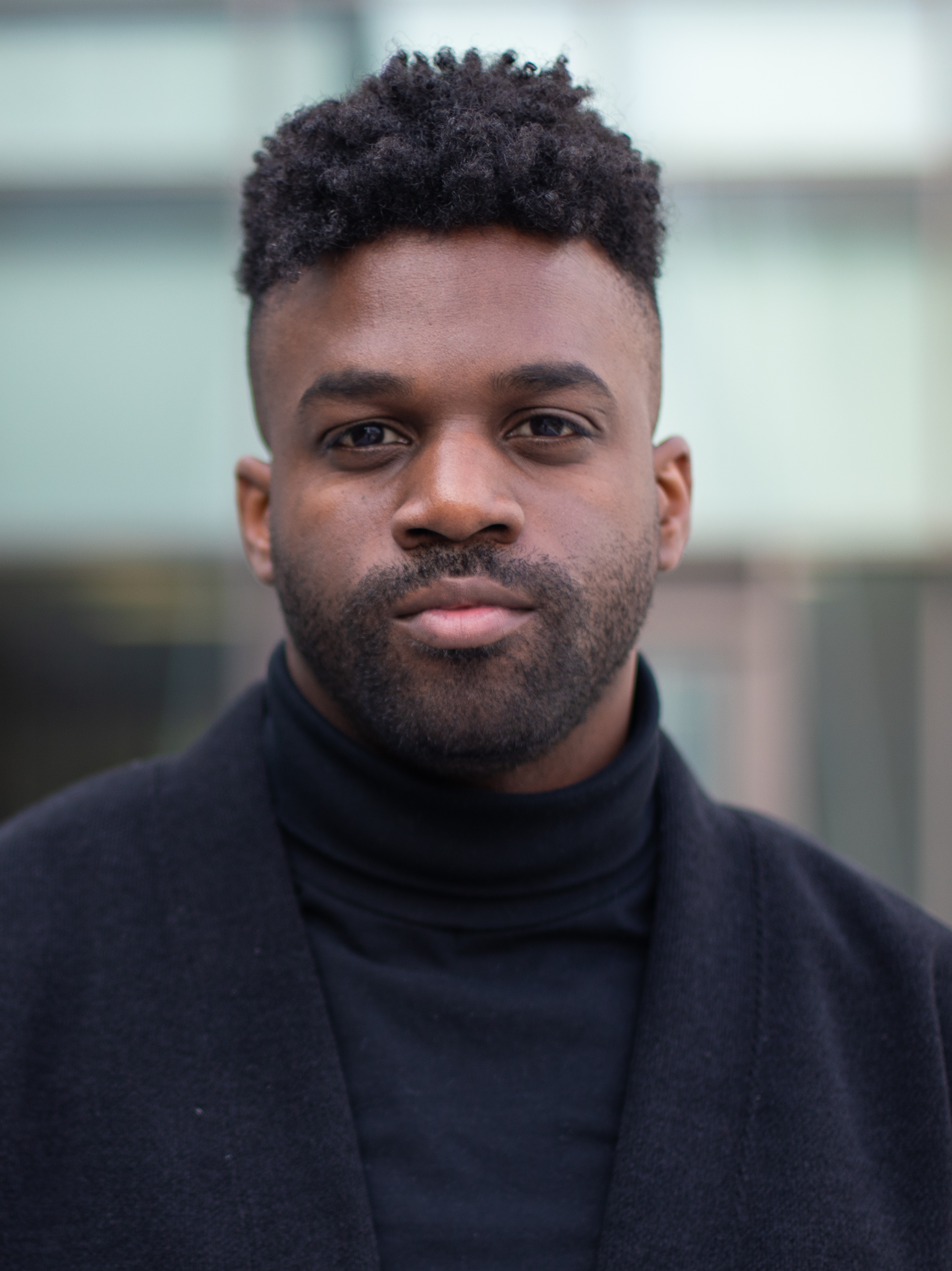
- Alexander in 2025

Background information
- Born: Athens, Greece
- Genres: Blues; soul; R&B; folk; alternative
- Occupations: Singer; songwriter; guitarist
- Instruments: Vocals; guitar
- Years active: 2015–present
- Label: Dualtone
- Website: abrahamalexander.com

Abraham Alexander is an American singer, songwriter, and guitarist based in Fort Worth, Texas.

Becoming a wellknown singer in the Texas underground scene, he co-wrote and sang "Like a Bird" from the film Sing Sing receiving an Academy Awards nomination for Best Original Song.

== Early life ==
Alexander was born and raised in Athens, Greece, the son of Nigerian immigrants. He relocated to Texas with his family in the early 2000s at age 11 in order to escape the ever-present racial tensions of his birthplace. After losing his mother in a car accident with a drunk driver, Alexander was adopted in his teens by a foster family. In high school, he excelled at soccer, which led to a scholarship to play in college at Texas Wesleyan. In 2011, he sustained a torn ACL, which ultimately sidelined his soccer ambitions, but opened the door to his future music career. While recovering from his injury, he learned to play the guitar, which was given to him by his girlfriend at the time.

== Career ==
After a chance encounter with Leon Bridges, Alexander's first break in the industry came when he was invited to hum and sing background vocals during the recording of his 2015 debut album Coming Home. At the encouragement of Bridges, Alexander began performing at open mics around Fort Worth. This led to an invitation to open for R&B artist Ginuwine in February 2017 at House of Blues in Dallas, Alexander's first real show.

He released his first song in April 2019, a cover of Chris Isaak's classic hit "Wicked Game" as part of the Mahogany Covers series. In September later that year, he released his self-titled debut EP featuring his first four original songs.

In June 2022, Alexander co-wrote a new song with Bridges and Kevin Kaarl called "Summer Moon" inspired by a local Fort Worth coffee shop they frequented during the COVID pandemic.

In April 2023, he released his debut SEA/SONS, which was co-produced by Alexander, Matt Pence, and Brad Cook, and released through Dualtone Records. It featured guest appearances by Gary Clark Jr. on the track "Stay" as well as soul legend Mavis Staples on the track "Deja Vu." The album debuted at #42 on Billboard's Top Current Album Sales chart and #83 on Billboard's Top Album Sales chart. It was met with critical acclaim from NPR, No Depression, American Songwriter, The Bluegrass Situation, The Tennessean, World Cafe, and KCRW. He also made his television debut on CBS Saturday Morning, performing his singles "Today," "Tears Run Dry," and "Eye Can See" along with a feature interview. In May 2023, he joined Gibson as the brand's first Marquee Artist.

In December 2023, Alexander contributed a cover of Sam Cooke's "Bring It On Home to Me" alongside Wilder Woods for Dualtone Records' Discovered & Covered compilation featuring an array of artists on their roster. In 2024, Alexander wrote and composed with Adrian Quesada the song "Like a Bird" for Greg Kwedar's film Sing Sing. The song was nominated at the 97th Academy Awards for Best Original Song.

In addition to his own headline tours, Alexander has supported artists on the road such as Leon Bridges, Charley Crockett, Ani DiFranco, Black Pumas, Gary Clark Jr., The Lumineers, and Mavis Staples among others. He has also performed at festivals including Bonnaroo, Newport Folk Festival, and Austin City Limits Festival.

== Discography ==
=== Albums ===
- SEA/SONS (2023)

=== EPs ===
- Abraham Alexander (2019)
- Electric Deluxe Session (2023)

=== Singles ===
List of singles, with selected chart positions, showing year released and album name
Title	Year	Peak chart positions	Album
Title	Year	US AAA	Album
"Wicked Game"	2019	—	Non-album single
"Lovers Game"	2019	—	Abraham Alexander (EP)
"Stay"	2019	—	Abraham Alexander (EP)
"Stay" (featuring Gary Clark Jr.)	2022	—	SEA/SONS
"Heart of Gold"	2022	—	SEA/SONS
"Tears Run Dry"	2023	11	SEA/SONS
"Bring It On Home to Me" (with Wilder Woods)	2023	—	Discovered & Covered (compilation album by Dualtone Records)
"Like a Bird" (with Adrian Quesada)	2024	—	Sing Sing soundtrack
"Where We Are"	2024	—	Non-album single
"—" denotes a single that did not chart or was not released in that territory.

== Awards and nominations ==
Association	Year	Category	Nominated work	Result	Ref.
Academy Awards	2025	Best Original Song	"Like a Bird" from Sing Sing	Nominated	
Black Reel Awards	2025	Outstanding Original Song	"Like a Bird" from Sing Sing	Nominated	
Houston Film Critics Society Awards	2024	Best Original Song	"Like a Bird" from Sing Sing	Nominated	
