= Jockey (2021 film) =

2021 drama film

- Theatrical release poster
- Directed by: Clint Bentley
- Written by: Clint Bentley; Greg Kwedar
- Produced by: Clint Bentley; Greg Kwedar; Nancy Schafer
- Starring: Clifton Collins Jr.; Molly Parker; Moises Arias
- Cinematography: Adolpho Veloso
- Edited by: Parker Laramie
- Music by: Bryce Dessner; Aaron Dessner
- Production companies: Marfa Peach Company; Contrast Films; ICM Partners
- Distributed by: Sony Pictures Classics
- Release date: January 31, 2021 (Sundance)
- Running time: 95 minutes
- Country: United States
- Language: English
- Box office: $121,024

Jockey is a 2021 American drama film directed by Clint Bentley, who co-wrote the screenplay with Greg Kwedar. The film stars Clifton Collins Jr., Molly Parker, and Moises Arias. The film had its world premiere at the 2021 Sundance Film Festival on January 31, 2021.

== Plot ==
The health of horse rider Jackson Silva begins to deteriorate after decades of work. With the help of a promising new horse and his trainer, Ruth, Jackson prepares for the upcoming championship, which could be his last.

== Cast ==
- Clifton Collins Jr. as Jackson Silva
- Molly Parker as Ruth Wilkes
- Moisés Arias as Gabriel Boullait
- Logan Cormier as Leo Brock
- Colleen Hartnett as Ana Boullait
- Daniel Adams as Jerry Meyer

== Release ==
On January 30, 2021, the film was acquired for distribution by Sony Pictures Classics. Jockey had its world premiere at the 2021 Sundance Film Festival on January 31 in the U.S. Cinema Dramatic Competition section.

== Reception ==
=== Box office ===
In the U.S. and Canada, the film earned $2,789 from three theaters in its opening weekend. From two theaters, the film made $969 on its second weekend, and $1,913 on its third.

=== Critical response ===
On the review aggregator website Rotten Tomatoes, 88% of 59 critics' reviews are positive, with an average rating of 7.10/10. The website's consensus reads: "Jockey rests almost entirely on Clifton Collins Jr. in the title role – and he proves more than up to the task with a brilliant performance that gives this poignant drama its soul." Metacritic, which uses a weighted average, assigned the film a score of 76 out of 100, based on 16 critics, indicating "generally favorable" reviews.

=== Accolades ===
- Sundance Film Festival: Special Jury Prize for Acting - Clifton Collins Jr.

== See also ==
- List of films about horses
- List of films about horse racing
