= San Francisco Bay Area Film Critics Circle Award for Best Actor =

Annual US film award

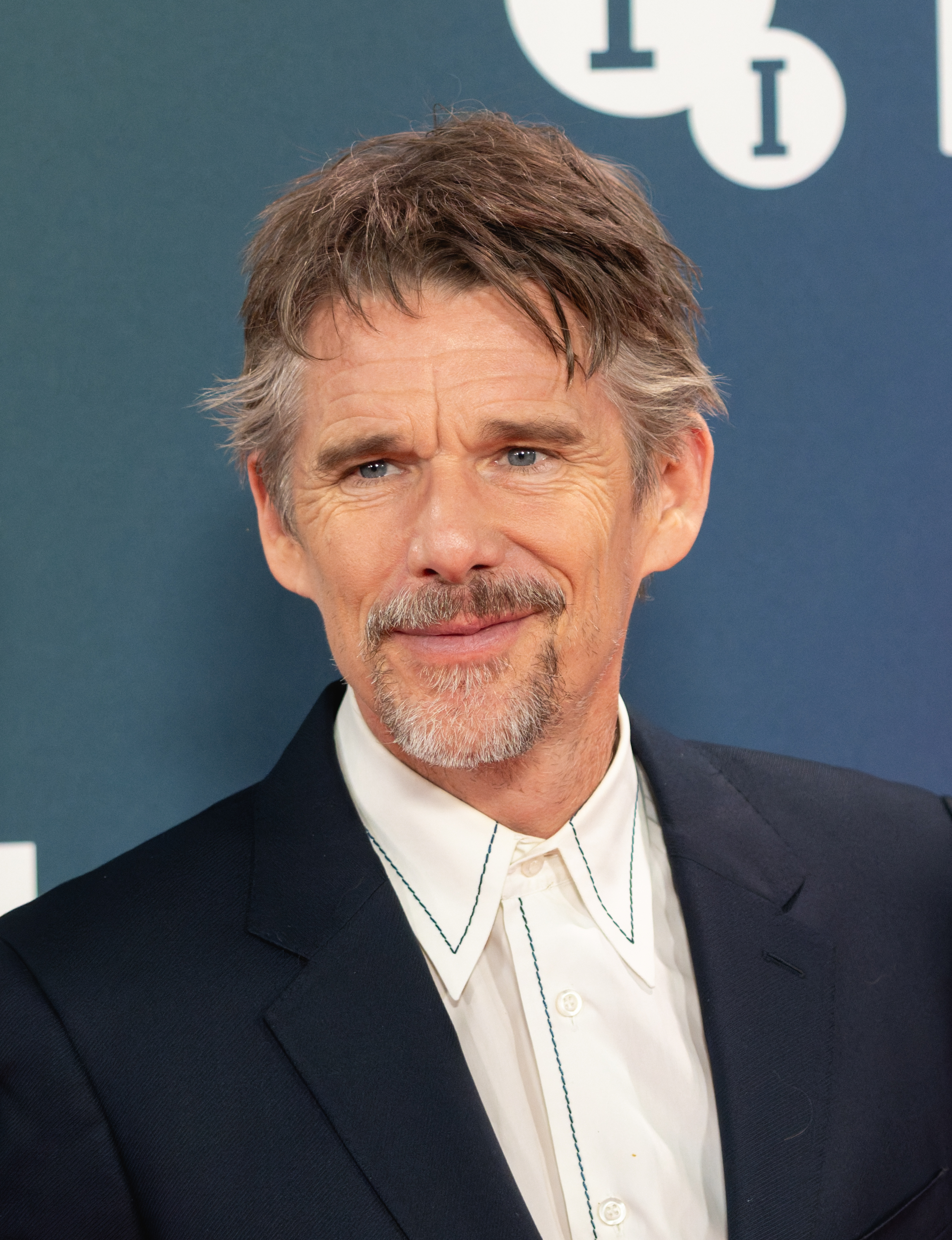
- The 2025 recipient: Ethan Hawke
- Awarded for: Best Performance by an Actor in a Leading Role
- Country: United States
- Presented by: San Francisco Bay Area Film Critics Circle
- First award: Michael Caine; The Quiet American (2002)
- Currently held by: Ethan Hawke; Blue Moon (2025)
- Website: sfbafcc.com

The San Francisco Bay Area Film Critics Circle Award for Best Actor is an award given by the San Francisco Bay Area Film Critics Circle to honor an actor who has delivered an outstanding performance in a leading role.

== Winners ==
=== 2000s ===
Year	Winner	Film	Role
2002	Michael Caine	The Quiet American	Thomas Fowler
2003	Bill Murray	Lost in Translation	Bob Harris
2004	Paul Giamatti	Sideways	Miles Raymond
2005	Heath Ledger	Brokeback Mountain	Ennis Del Mar
2006	Sacha Baron Cohen	Borat: Cultural Learnings of America for Make Benefit Glorious Nation of Kazakhstan	Borat Sagdiyev
2007	George Clooney	Michael Clayton	Michael Clayton
2008	Sean Penn	Milk	Harvey Milk
2008	Mickey Rourke	The Wrestler	Randy "The Ram" Robinson
2009	Colin Firth	A Single Man	George Falconer

=== 2010s ===
Year	Winner	Film	Role
2010	Colin Firth	The King's Speech	King George VI
2011	Gary Oldman	Tinker Tailor Soldier Spy	George Smiley
2012	Joaquin Phoenix	The Master	Freddie Quell
2013	Chiwetel Ejiofor	12 Years a Slave	Solomon Northup
2014	Michael Keaton	Birdman or (The Unexpected Virtue of Ignorance)	Riggan Thomson
2015	Paul Dano	Love & Mercy	Brian Wilson
2016	Denzel Washington	Fences	Troy Maxson
2017	Andy Serkis	War for the Planet of the Apes	Caesar
2018	Ethan Hawke	First Reformed	Reverend Ernst Toller
2019	Antonio Banderas	Pain and Glory	Salvador Mallo

=== 2020s ===
Year	Winner	Film	Role
2020	Chadwick Boseman	Ma Rainey's Black Bottom	Levee Green
2021	Benedict Cumberbatch	The Power of the Dog	Phil Burbank
2022	Colin Farrell	The Banshees of Inisherin	Pádraic Súilleabháin
2023	Jeffrey Wright	American Fiction	Thelonious "Monk" Ellison
2024	Colman Domingo	Sing Sing	John "Divine G" Whitfield
2025	Ethan Hawke	Blue Moon	Lorenz Hart

== Multiple awards ==
2 awards

- Ethan Hawke (2018, 2025)
