= Clint Bentley =

American filmmaker (born 1985)

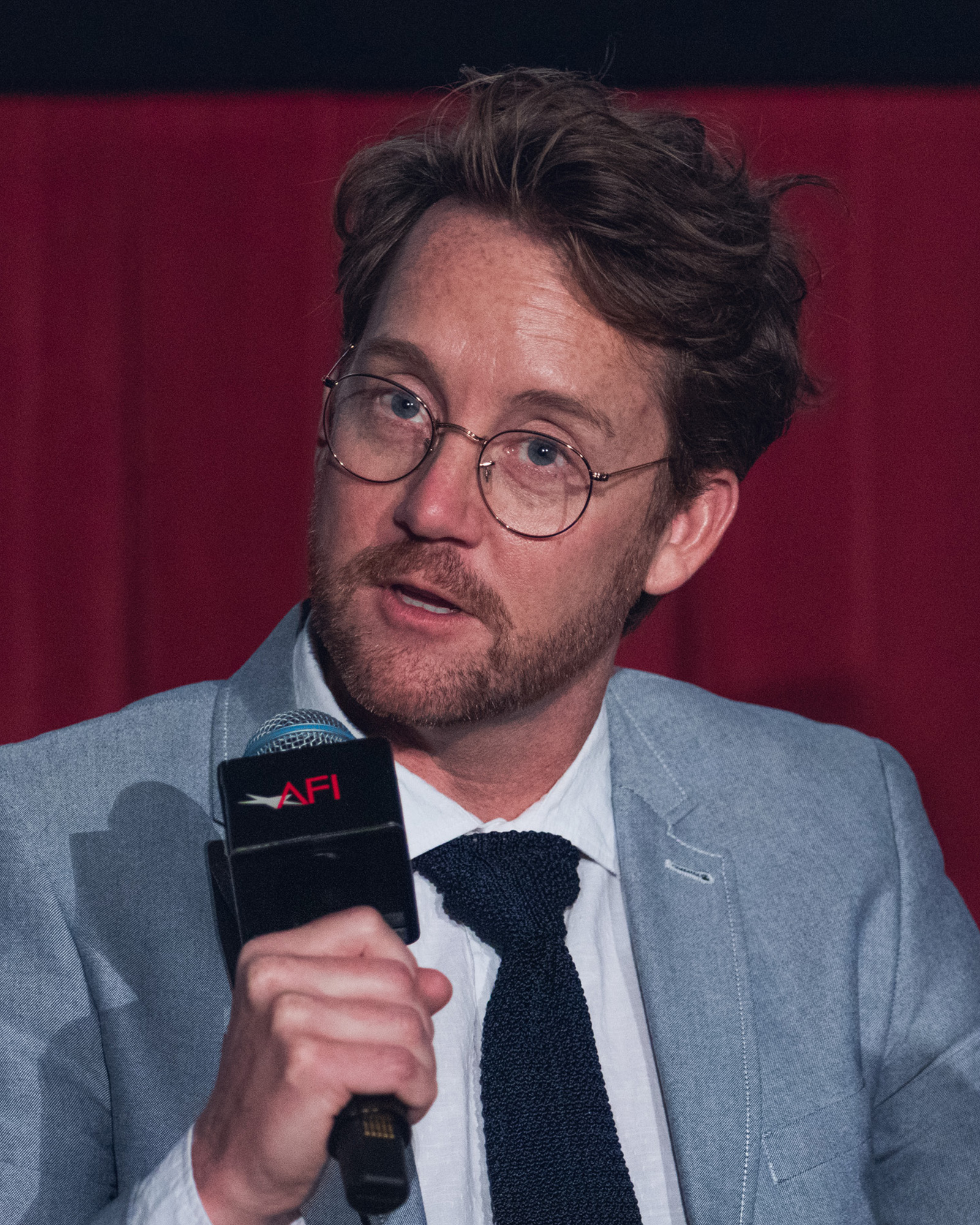
- Bentley in 2025
- Born: January 1, 1985 (age 41); Florida, United States
- Education: Stetson University
- Occupations: Filmmaker; director; writer; producer
- Years active: 2016–present

Clint Bentley (born January 1, 1985) is an American film director and screenwriter. His directorial credits include Jockey (2021) and Train Dreams (2025). For his work as a screenwriter, Bentley was twice nominated for the Academy Award for Best Adapted Screenplay for Sing Sing (2023) and Train Dreams.

== Early life and education ==
Bentley was born on a cattle ranch in Florida. He attended Stetson University and graduated in 2008.

== Career ==
=== As a screenwriter ===
In 2016, Bentley made his feature screenwriting debut with Transpecos, a film that follows U.S. border patrol agents who uncover a Mexican drug cartel plot. The script was co-written with director Greg Kwedar, who would ultimately become Bentley's long-time filmmaking partner.

In 2023, Bentley was the co-writer and a producer for Sing Sing, a film based on the RTA program at Sing Sing Correctional Facility in New York. At the 97th Academy Awards, the script, co-written with director Kwedar, was nominated for Best Adapted Screenplay.

=== As a director ===
In 2021, Bentley made his feature directorial debut with Jockey, inspired by his late father, who was a jockey and horse trainer. The film premiered at the 2021 Sundance Film Festival, where it won the Special Jury Prize for Best Actor for Clifton Collins Jr. After its debut, the film was acquired and distributed by Sony Pictures Classics.

In 2025, Bentley directed Train Dreams, a film based on Denis Johnson's 2011 Pulitzer Prize-finalist novella, with a screenplay co-written by himself and Kwedar. It premiered at the 2025 Sundance Film Festival, and was distributed by Netflix with a limited theatrical release. The film received critical acclaim, and picked up nominations for Best Feature and Best Adapted Screenplay for the 35th Gotham Film Awards.

== Filmography ==
Year	Title	Director	Writer	Producer
2016	Transpecos	No	Yes	Yes
2021	Jockey	Yes	Yes	Yes
2023	Sing Sing	No	Yes	Yes
2025	Train Dreams	Yes	Yes	No

== Accolades ==
Award	Date of ceremony	Category	Nominated work	Result
Academy Awards	March 2, 2025	Best Adapted Screenplay	Sing Sing	Nominated
Academy Awards	March 15, 2026	Best Adapted Screenplay	Train Dreams	Nominated
BAFTA Awards	February 16, 2025	Best Adapted Screenplay	Sing Sing	Nominated
Critics' Choice Movie Awards	January 12, 2025	Best Adapted Screenplay	Sing Sing	Nominated
Critics' Choice Movie Awards	January 4, 2026	Best Adapted Screenplay	Train Dreams	Nominated
Film Independent Spirit Awards	March 6, 2022	John Cassavetes Award	Jockey	Nominated
Film Independent Spirit Awards	February 22, 2025	Best Feature	Sing Sing	Nominated
Film Independent Spirit Awards	February 15, 2026	Best Director	Train Dreams	Won
Gotham Awards	December 1, 2025	Best Adapted Screenplay	Train Dreams	Nominated
Satellite Awards	January 26, 2025	Best Adapted Screenplay	Sing Sing	Nominated
Satellite Awards	March 8, 2026	Best Adapted Screenplay	Train Dreams	Nominated
