= Rehabilitation Through the Arts =

Social justice nonprofit organization

Rehabilitation Through the Arts (RTA-Arts) is a social justice non profit in Westchester County, New York known for the film Sing Sing.

RTA, which uses theater as a tool of prisoner rehabilitation, was started in 1996 by Katherine Vockins as The Theater Workshop following a visit to Sing Sing. Their first production was Reality in Motion and they are now in operation in eight prisons in New York State.

Vockins led RTA through 2022 and former alum Jermaine Archer is the current executive director as of February 2025.
