= Clarence Maclin =

American actor

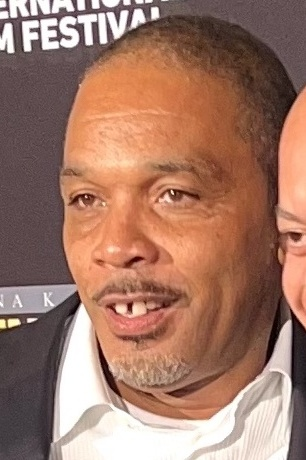
- Maclin at the 2024 Hamptons International Film Festival
- Born: November 29, 1966 (age 59); Tennessee, U.S.
- Other name: Divine Eye
- Education: Mercy University (AS)
- Occupation: Actor
- Known for: Sing Sing (2023)

Clarence "Divine Eye" Maclin (born November 29, 1966) is an American actor. He was incarcerated for armed robbery at Sing Sing Correctional Facility, where he participated in the Rehabilitation Through the Arts program and learned acting. He portrayed a fictionalized version of himself in the 2023 film Sing Sing. His performance earned him nominations for Best Supporting Actor at the BAFTA Awards, Critics' Choice Movie Awards, Gotham Awards, and Independent Spirit Awards. Additionally, Maclin was nominated for the 2025 Academy Award for Best Adapted Screenplay.

== Early life and education ==
Maclin was born in Tennessee and raised in Mount Vernon, New York. He attended Mount Vernon High School and earned an associate degree in behavioral psychology from Mercy University.

== Career ==
When he was 29, Maclin was sentenced to 17 years at the Sing Sing Correctional Facility for armed robbery. During his incarceration, Maclin participated in the Rehabilitation Through the Arts program. Since his release, Maclin has worked as a youth counselor, creative arts specialist, and gang intervention specialist at Lincoln Hall Boys Haven in Somers, New York.

He made his feature film debut in Sing Sing, portraying a younger version of himself. Maclin's performance has received critical acclaim. For the role, Maclin earned nominations for Best Supporting Actor at the 30th Critics' Choice Awards, 34th Gotham Awards, 40th Independent Spirit Awards, 29th Satellite Awards, and 78th British Academy Film Awards; he won the Gotham. He also received nominations for Best Adapted Screenplay at the 78th British Academy Film Awards & 97th Academy Awards, alongside co-writers Clint Bentley, Greg Kwedar, and John "Divine G" Whitfield.

== Filmography ==
Year	Title	Role	Notes
2023	Sing Sing	Himself	Also writer and executive producer
TBA	In Starland †	TBA	Post-production

== Awards and nominations ==
Year	Awards	Category	Nominated work	Result	Ref.
2024	The Astra Awards	Best Supporting Actor	Sing Sing	Nominated	
2024	Dallas–Fort Worth Film Critics Association	Best Supporting Actor	Sing Sing	5th place	
2024	Gotham Awards	Outstanding Supporting Performance	Sing Sing	Won	
2024	Gotham Awards	Social Justice Tribute	Sing Sing	Won	
2024	San Francisco Bay Area Film Critics Circle Awards	Best Adapted Screenplay	Sing Sing	Won	
2024	Seattle Film Critics Society Awards	Best Supporting Actor	Sing Sing	Won	
2024	Academy Awards	Best Adapted Screenplay	Sing Sing	Nominated	
2025	Independent Spirit Awards	Best Supporting Performance	Sing Sing	Nominated	
2025	British Academy Film Awards	Best Actor in a Supporting Role	Sing Sing	Nominated	
2025	British Academy Film Awards	Best Adapted Screenplay	Sing Sing	Nominated	
2025	Critics' Choice Movie Awards	Best Supporting Actor	Sing Sing	Nominated	
2025	AARP Movies for Grownups Awards	Best Supporting Actor	Sing Sing	Nominated	
2025	AARP Movies for Grownups Awards	Best Ensemble	Sing Sing	Won	
2025	Satellite Awards	Best Supporting Actor	Sing Sing	Nominated	
2025	Satellite Awards	Best Adapted Screenplay	Sing Sing	Nominated	
