= Seattle Film Critics Society Award for Best Ensemble Cast =

Award given by the Seattle Film Critics Society

The Seattle Film Critics Society Award for Best Ensemble Cast is one of the annual awards given by the Seattle Film Critics Society.

== Winners and nominees ==
indicates the winners.

=== 2010s ===
Year	Film
2016
2016	Moonlight
2016	Captain Fantastic
2016	Fences
2016	Hell or High Water
2016	Manchester by the Sea
2017
2017	Get Out
2017	Call Me by Your Name
2017	Lady Bird
2017	The Post
2017	Three Billboards Outside Ebbing, Missouri
2018
2018	Widows
2018	Black Panther
2018	The Favourite
2018	If Beale Street Could Talk
2018	Vice
2019
2019	Parasite
2019	The Irishman
2019	Knives Out
2019	Little Women
2019	Once Upon a Time in Hollywood

=== 2020s ===
Year	Film
2020
2020	Da 5 Bloods
2020	Judas and the Black Messiah
2020	Ma Rainey's Black Bottom
2020	Minari
2020	One Night in Miami...
