= San Francisco Bay Area Film Critics Circle Award for Best Film =

Annual US film award

The San Francisco Film Critics Circle Award for Best Picture is one of the awards given by the San Francisco Film Critics Circle to honor the finest achievements in film-making.

== Winners ==
=== 2000s ===
Year	Winner	Director
2002	The Pianist	Roman Polanski
2003	Lost in Translation	Sofia Coppola
2004	Sideways	Alexander Payne
2005	Brokeback Mountain	Ang Lee
2006	Little Children	Todd Field
2007	The Assassination of Jesse James by the Coward Robert Ford	Andrew Dominik
2008	Milk	Gus Van Sant
2009	The Hurt Locker	Kathryn Bigelow

=== 2010s ===
Year	Winner	Director
2010	The Social Network	David Fincher
2011	The Tree of Life	Terrence Malick
2012	The Master	Paul Thomas Anderson
2013	12 Years a Slave	Steve McQueen
2014	Boyhood	Richard Linklater
2015	Spotlight	Tom McCarthy
2016	Moonlight	Barry Jenkins
2017	The Florida Project	Sean Baker
2018	Roma	Alfonso Cuaron
2019	Once Upon a Time in Hollywood	Quentin Tarantino

=== 2020s ===
Year	Winner	Director
2020	Nomadland	Chloé Zhao
2021	The Power of the Dog	Jane Campion
2022	The Banshees of Inisherin	Martin McDonagh
2023	Oppenheimer	Christopher Nolan
2024	Anora	Sean Baker
