= 78th British Academy Film Awards =

2025 film award ceremony

- Date: 16 February 2025
- Site: Royal Festival Hall, London
- Hosted by: David Tennant

Highlights
- Best Film: Conclave
- Best British Film: Conclave
- Best Actor: Adrien Brody; The Brutalist
- Best Actress: Mikey Madison; Anora
- Most awards: The Brutalist / Conclave (4)
- Most nominations: Conclave (12)

The 78th British Academy Film Awards, more commonly known as the BAFTAs, were held on 16 February 2025, honouring the best national and foreign films of 2024, at the Royal Festival Hall within London's Southbank Centre. Presented by the British Academy of Film and Television Arts, accolades were given for the best feature-length films and documentaries of any nationality that were screened at British cinemas in 2024.

The BAFTA longlists were unveiled on 3 January 2025. The EE Rising Star Award nominees, which is the only category voted for by the British public, were unveiled on 7 January 2025. The nominations for all the other categories were unveiled on 15 January 2025 by previous BAFTA Award winners Mia McKenna-Bruce and Will Sharpe.

The Spanish-language French musical crime film Emilia Pérez received fifteen nods in the longlists, followed by Conclave with fourteen. Conclave went on to receive the most nominations with twelve, followed by Emilia Pérez with eleven and The Brutalist with nine. The Brutalist and Conclave ultimately won the most awards with four each.

== Winners and nominees ==
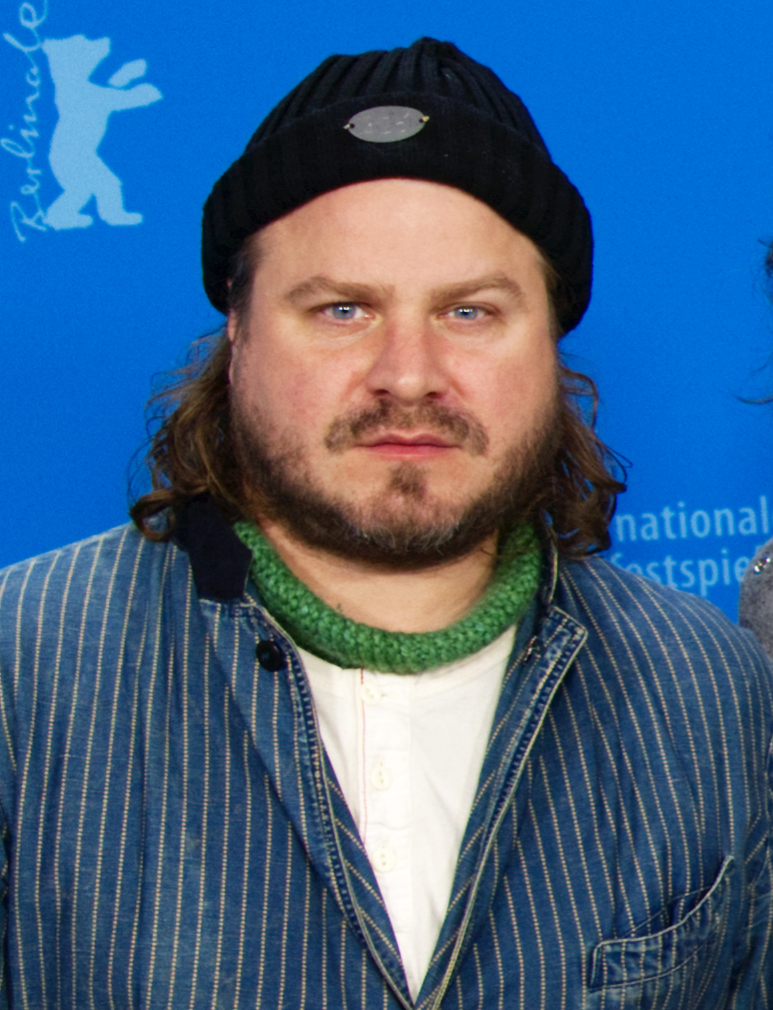
Brady Corbet, Best Director winner

Adrien Brody, Best Actor winner

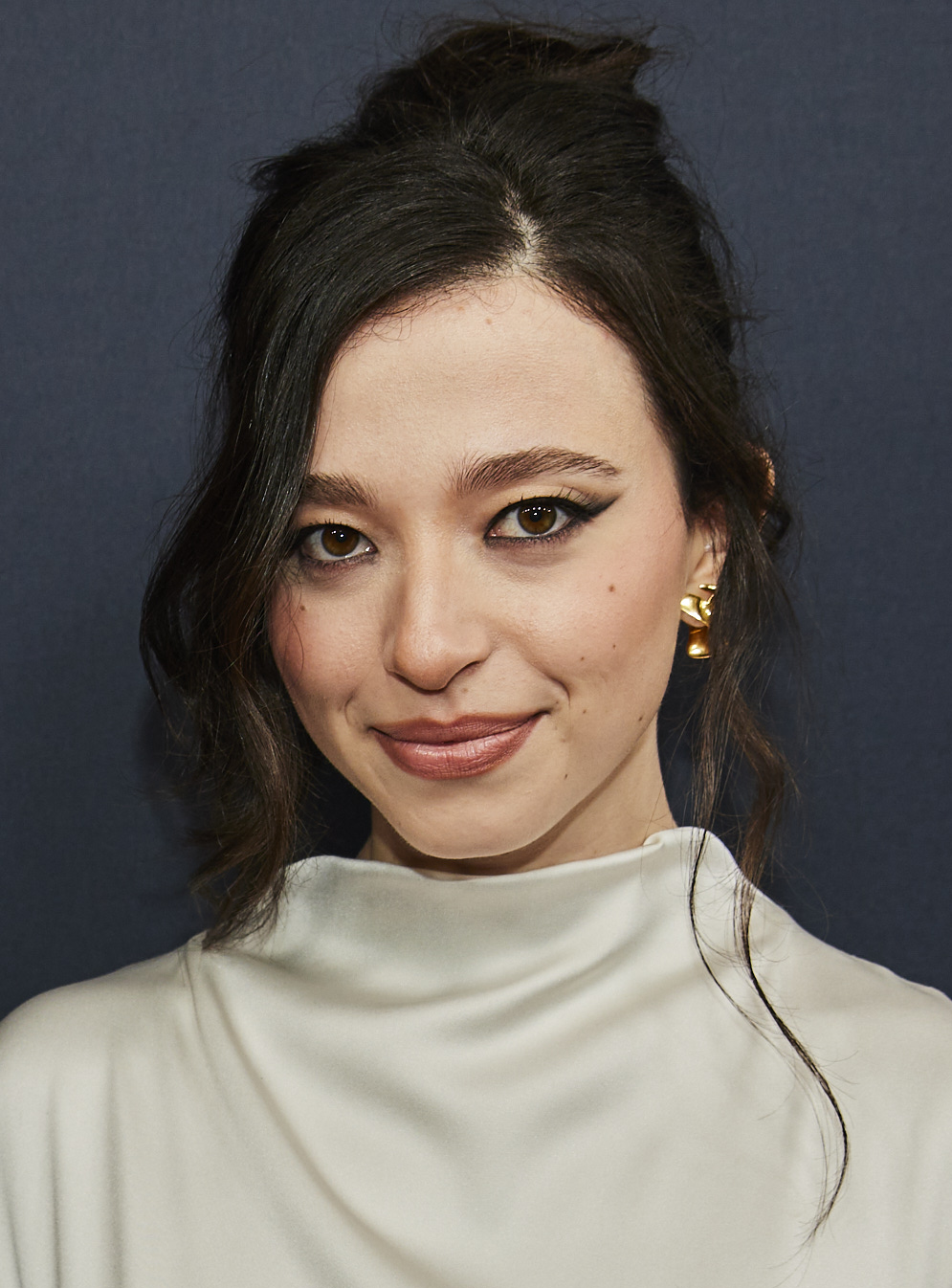
Mikey Madison, Best Actress winner

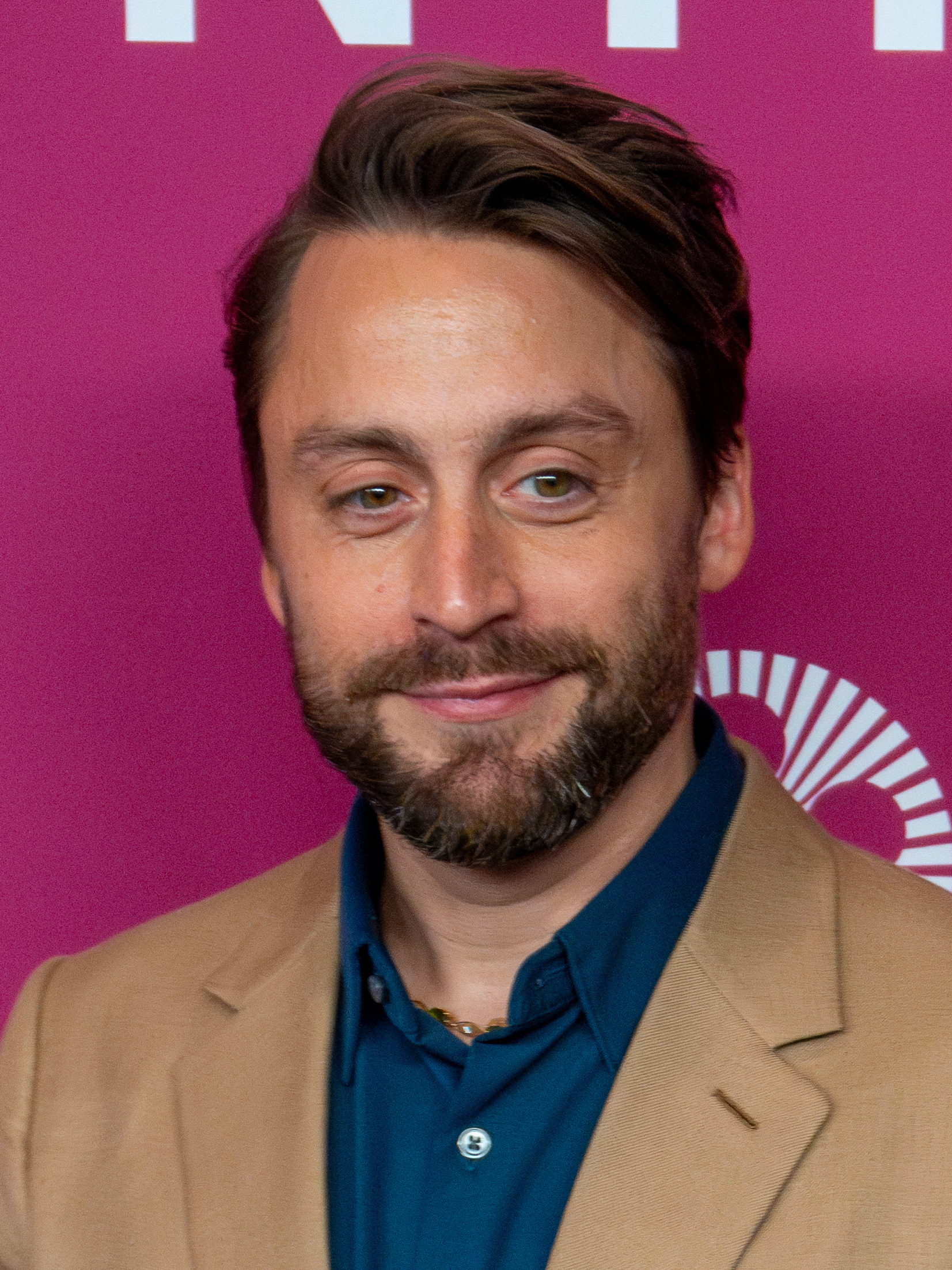
Kieran Culkin, Best Supporting Actor winner

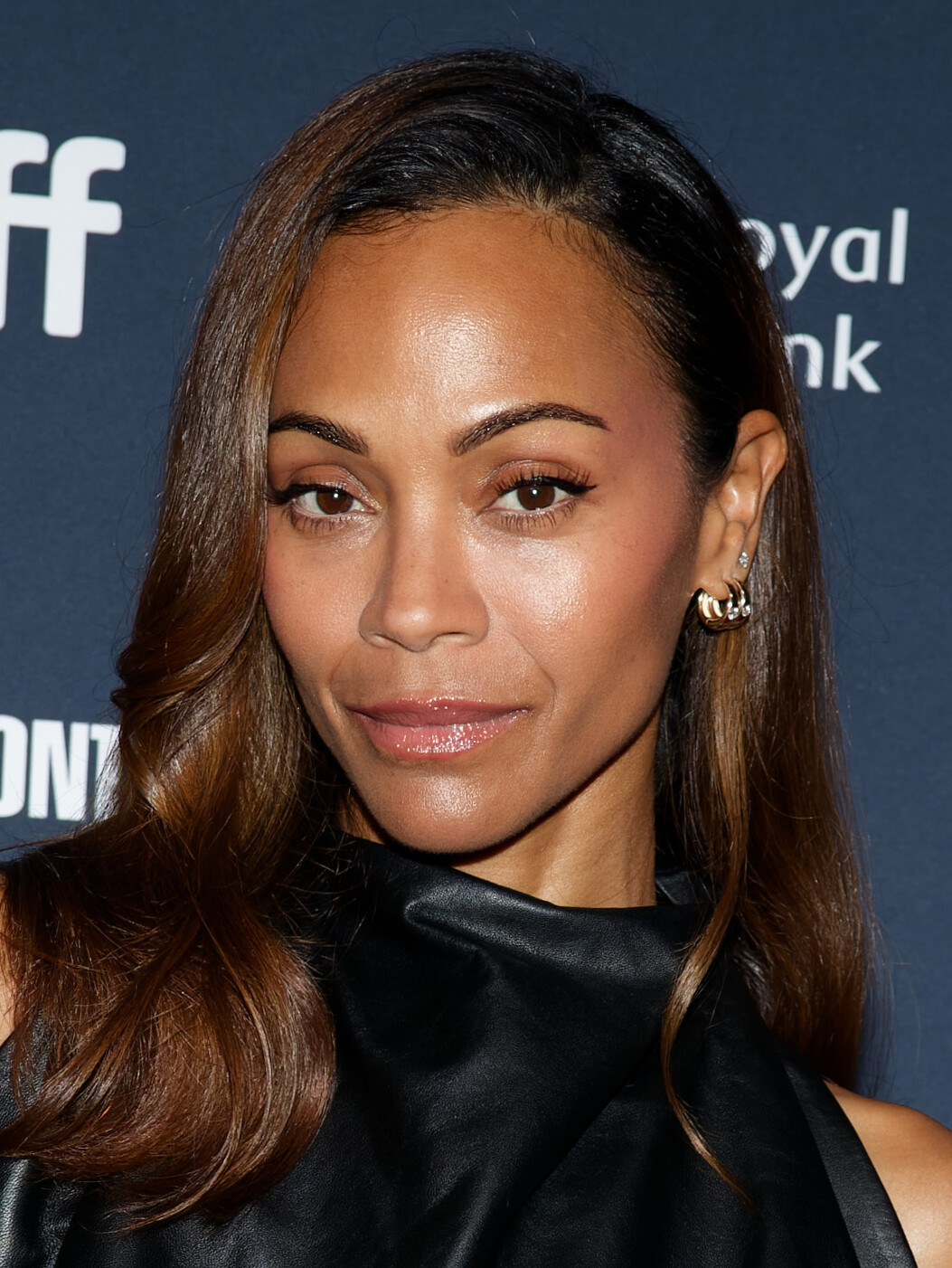
Zoe Saldaña, Best Supporting Actress winner

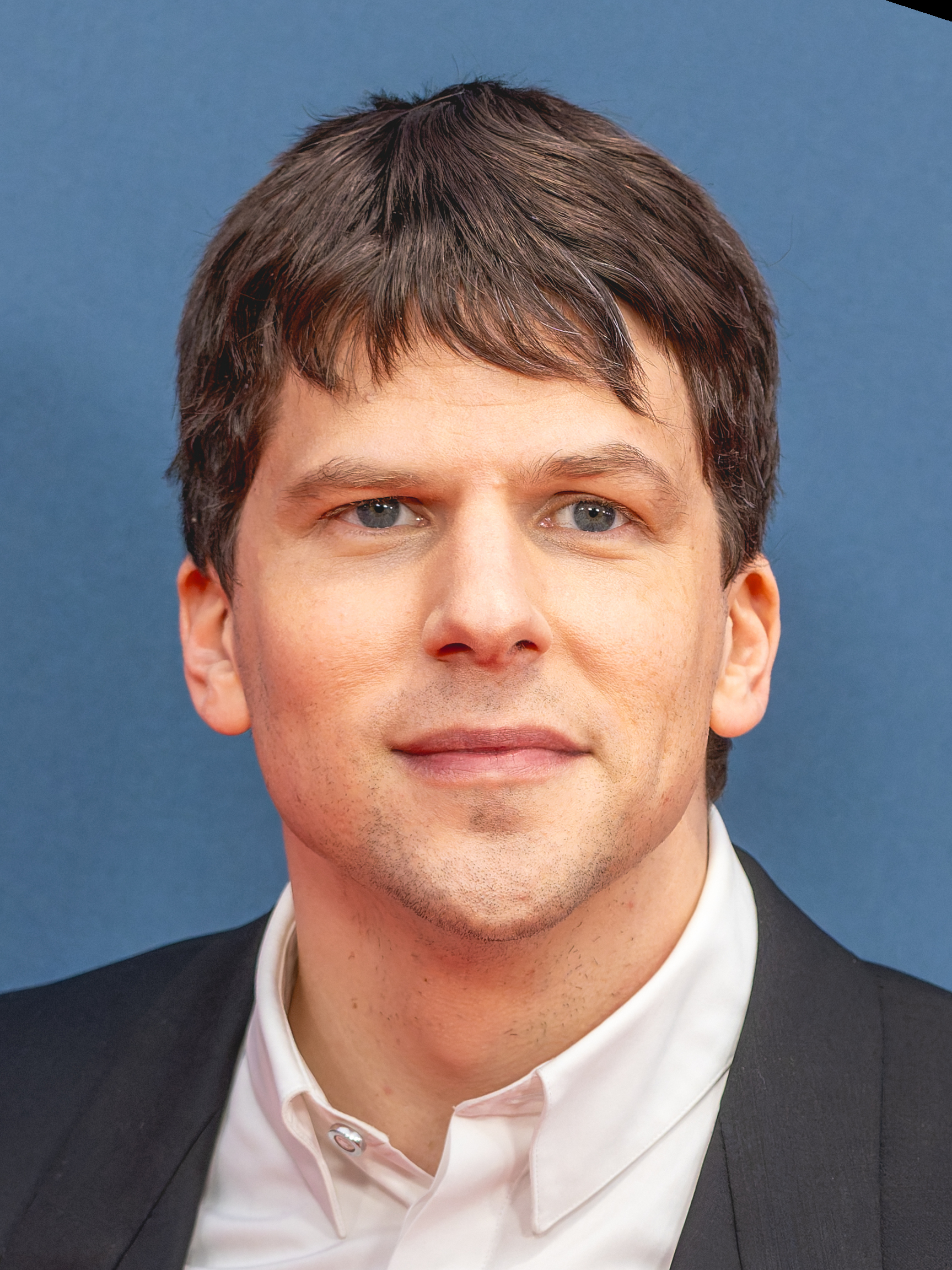
Jesse Eisenberg, Best Original Screenplay winner

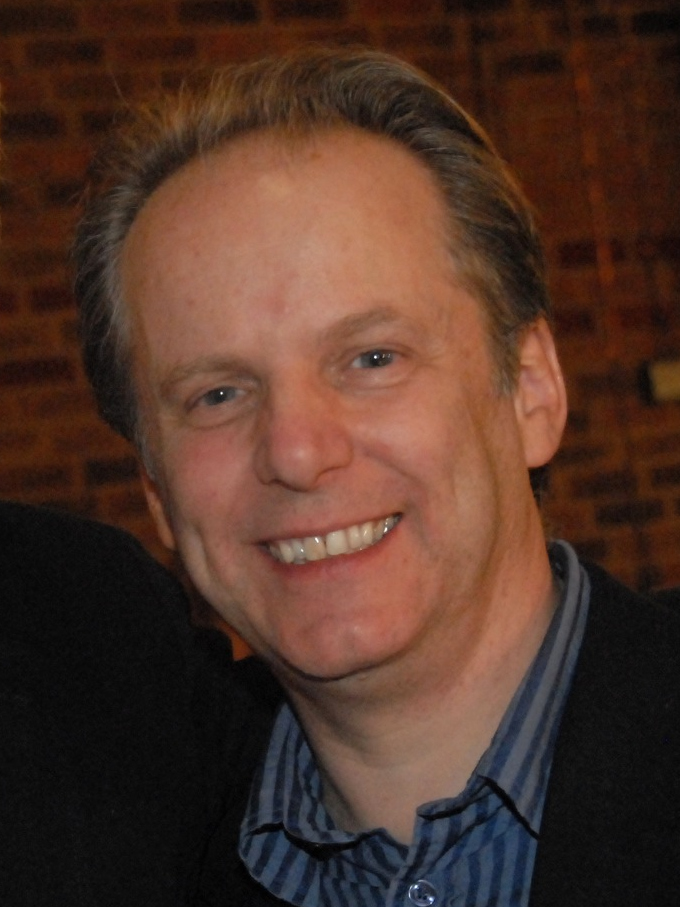
Nick Park, Best Animated Film and Best Children's & Family Film co-winner

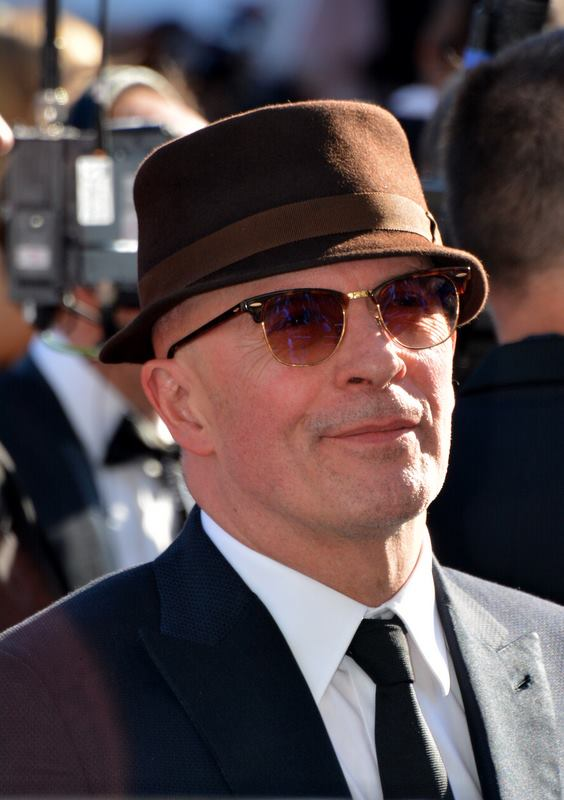
Jacques Audiard, Best Film Not in the English Language co-winner

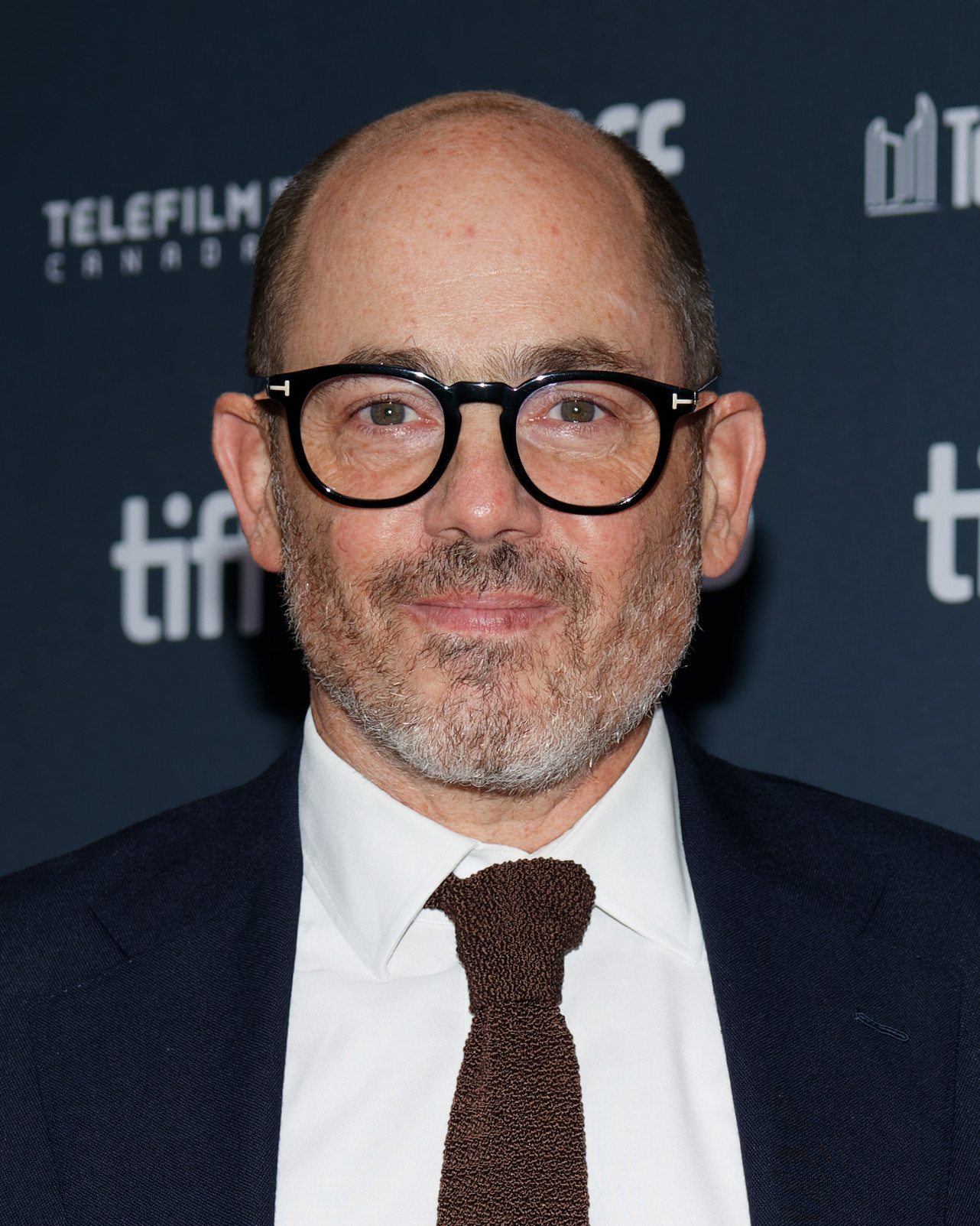
Edward Berger, Outstanding British Film co-winner

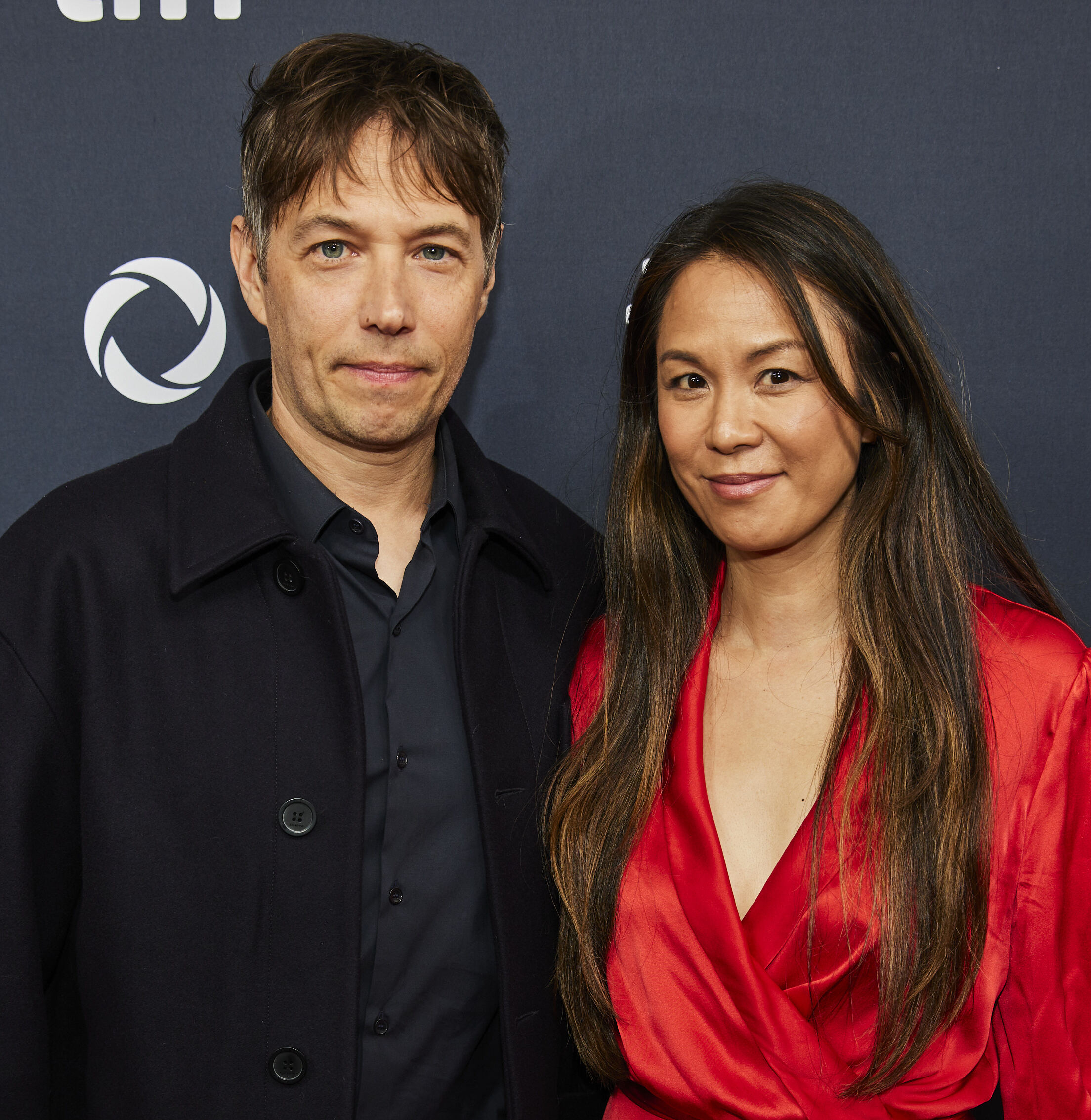
Sean Baker and Samantha Quan, Best Casting winners

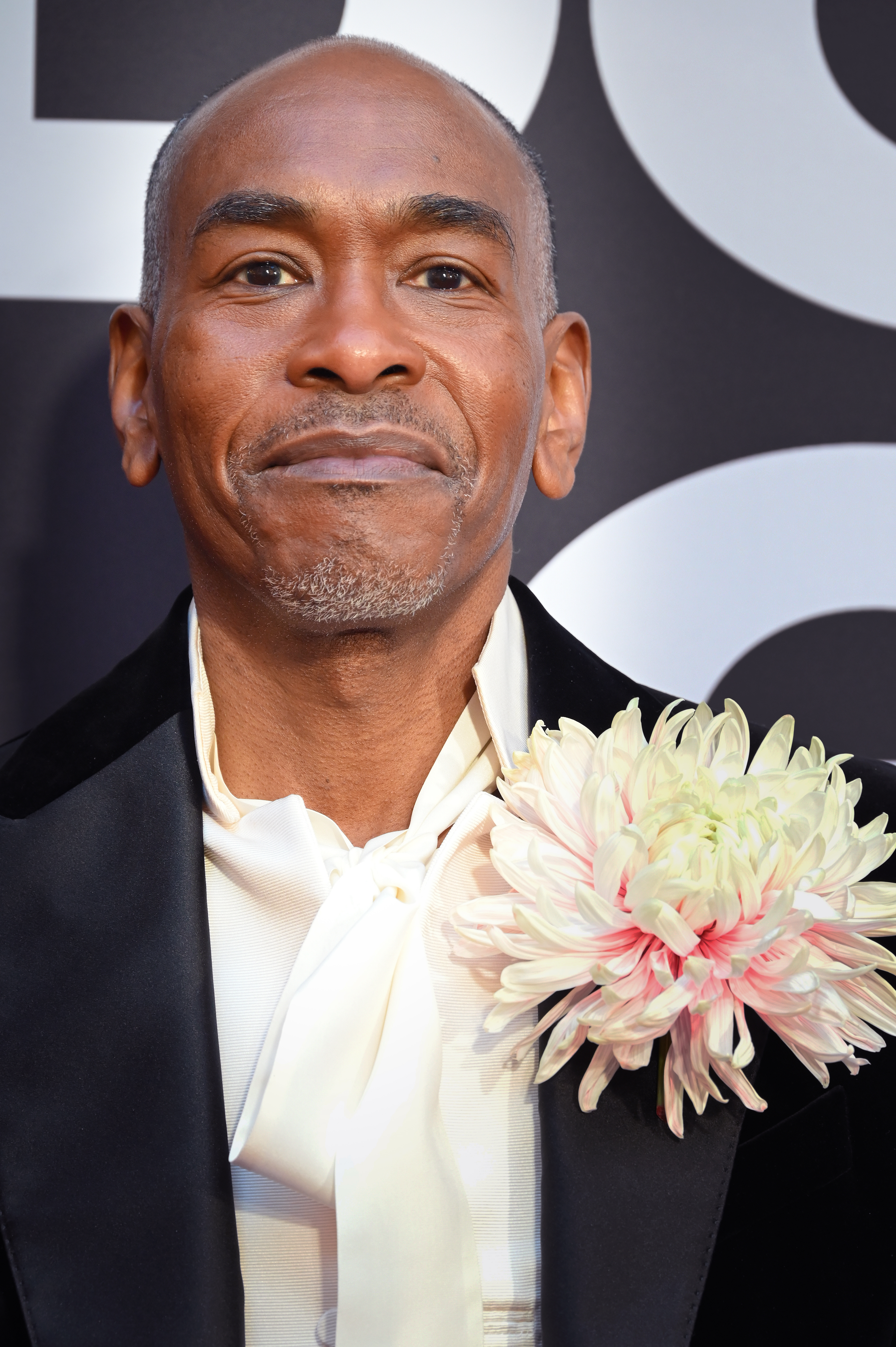
Paul Tazewell, Best Costume Design winner

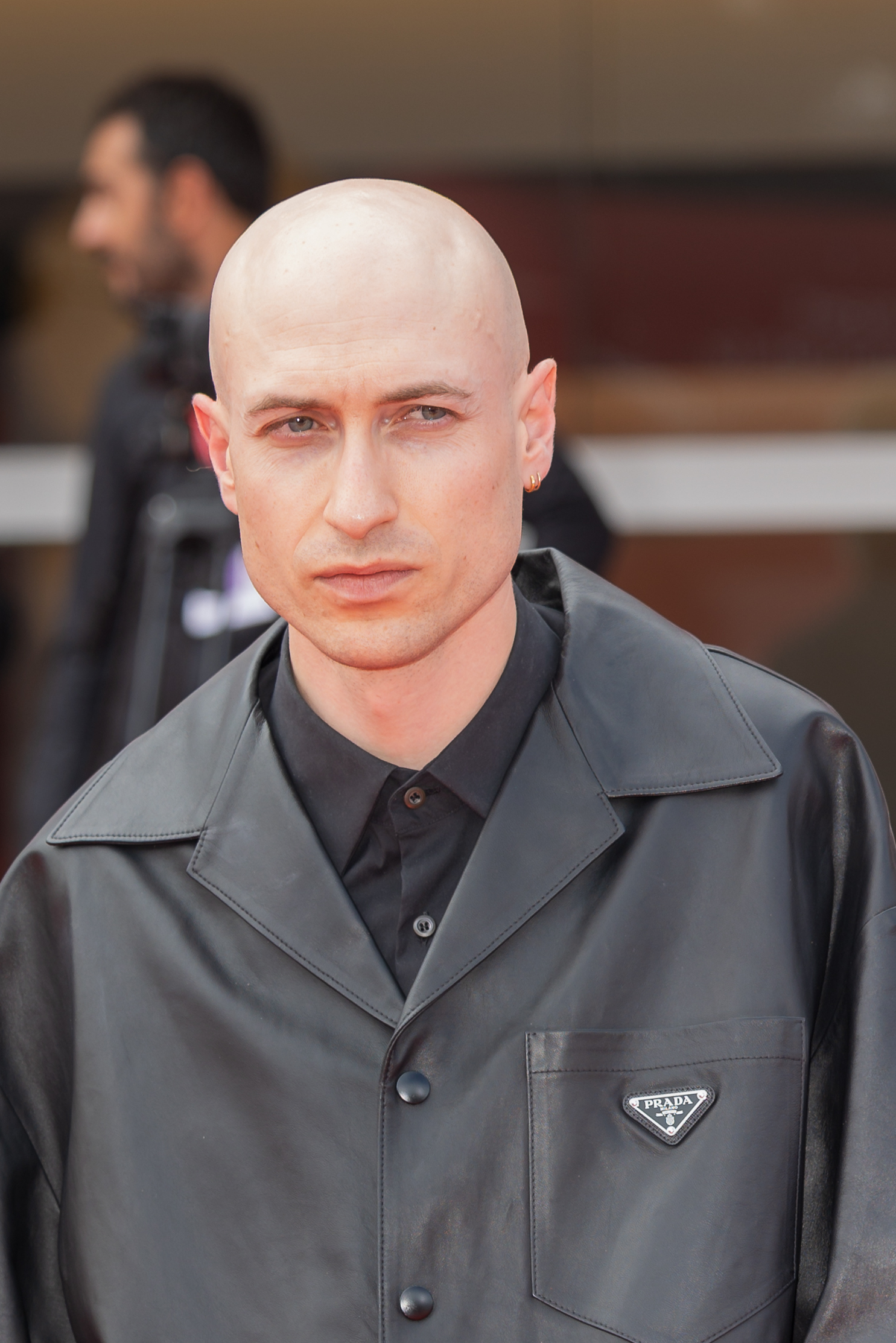
Daniel Blumberg, Best Original Score winner

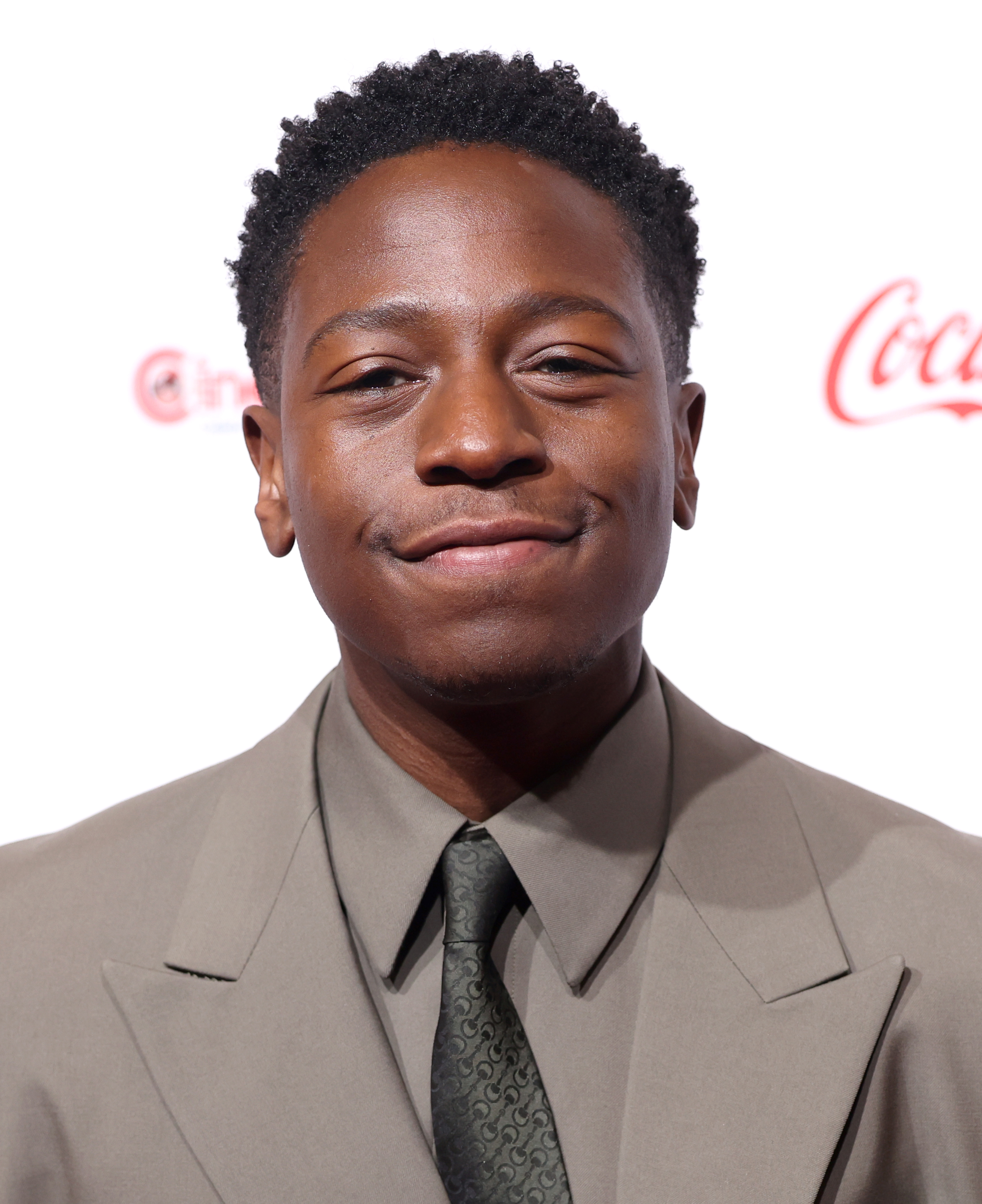
David Jonsson, EE Rising Star Award winner

The BAFTA longlists were announced on 3 January 2025. The nominees were announced on 7 January 2025. The winners were announced on 16 February 2025.

=== BAFTA Fellowship ===
The BAFTA Fellowship recipient was announced on 10 January 2025.

- **Warwick Davis**

=== Outstanding British Contribution to Cinema ===
The Outstanding Contribution Award recipient was announced on 6 February 2025.

- **MediCinema**

=== Awards ===
Winners are listed first and highlighted in boldface.

**Best Film**: **Conclave – Tessa Ross, Juliette Howell, and Michael A. Jackman**; Anora – Alex Coco, Samantha Quan, and Sean Baker; The Brutalist – Nick Gordon, Brian Young, Andrew Morrison, D.J. Gugenheim, and Brady Corbet; A Complete Unknown – Alex Heineman, Fred Berger, and James Mangold; Emilia Pérez – Pascal Caucheteux and Jacques Audiard	**Best Director**: **Brady Corbet – The Brutalist**; Jacques Audiard – Emilia Pérez; Sean Baker – Anora; Edward Berger – Conclave; Coralie Fargeat – The Substance; Denis Villeneuve – Dune: Part Two
**Best Actor in a Leading Role**: **Adrien Brody – The Brutalist as László Tóth**; Timothée Chalamet – A Complete Unknown as Bob Dylan; Colman Domingo – Sing Sing as John "Divine G" Whitfield; Ralph Fiennes – Conclave as Cardinal Thomas Lawrence; Hugh Grant – Heretic as Mr. Reed; Sebastian Stan – The Apprentice as Donald Trump	**Best Actress in a Leading Role**: **Mikey Madison – Anora as Anora "Ani" Mikheeva**; Cynthia Erivo – Wicked as Elphaba Thropp; Karla Sofía Gascón – Emilia Pérez as Emilia Pérez / Juan "Manitas" Del Monte; Marianne Jean-Baptiste – Hard Truths as Pansy Deacon; Demi Moore – The Substance as Elisabeth Sparkle; Saoirse Ronan – The Outrun as Rona
**Best Actor in a Supporting Role**: **Kieran Culkin – A Real Pain as Benji Kaplan**; Yura Borisov – Anora as Igor; Clarence Maclin – Sing Sing as Clarence "Divine Eye" Maclin; Edward Norton – A Complete Unknown as Pete Seeger; Guy Pearce – The Brutalist as Harrison Lee Van Buren Sr.; Jeremy Strong – The Apprentice as Roy Cohn	**Best Actress in a Supporting Role**: **Zoe Saldaña – Emilia Pérez as Rita Mora Castro**; Jamie Lee Curtis – The Last Showgirl as Annette; Selena Gomez – Emilia Pérez as Jessi Del Monte; Ariana Grande – Wicked as Galinda "Glinda" Upland; Felicity Jones – The Brutalist as Erzsébet Tóth; Isabella Rossellini – Conclave as Sister Agnes
**Best Original Screenplay**: **Jesse Eisenberg – A Real Pain**; Sean Baker – Anora; Brady Corbet and Mona Fastvold – The Brutalist; Coralie Fargeat – The Substance; Rich Peppiatt, Naoise Ó Cairealláin, Liam Óg Ó Hannaidh, and JJ Ó Dochartaigh – Kneecap	**Best Adapted Screenplay**: **Peter Straughan – Conclave**; Jacques Audiard – Emilia Pérez; Clint Bentley, Greg Kwedar, Clarence Maclin, and John "Divine G" Whitfield – Sing Sing; James Mangold and Jay Cocks – A Complete Unknown; RaMell Ross and Joslyn Barnes – Nickel Boys
**Best Animated Film**: **Wallace & Gromit: Vengeance Most Fowl – Nick Park, Merlin Crossingham, and Richard Beek**; Flow – Gints Zilbalodis and Matīss Kaža; Inside Out 2 – Kelsey Mann and Mark Nielsen; The Wild Robot – Chris Sanders and Jeff Hermann	**Best Documentary**: **Super/Man: The Christopher Reeve Story – Ian Bonhôte, Peter Ettedgui, Lizzie Gillett, and Robert Ford**; Black Box Diaries – Shiori Itō, Eric Nyari, and Hanna Aqvilin; Daughters – Natalie Rae, Angela Patton, Lisa Mazzotta, Justin Benoliel, James Cunningham, Sam Bisbee, Kathryn Everett, and Laura Choi Raycroft; No Other Land – Yuval Abraham, Basel Adra, Hamdan Ballal, and Rachel Szor; Will & Harper – Josh Greenbaum, Rafael Marmor, Christopher Leggett, Will Ferrell, and Jessica Elbaum
**Best Film Not in the English Language**: **Emilia Pérez – Jacques Audiard and Pascal Caucheteux**; All We Imagine as Light – Payal Kapadia and Thomas Hakim; I'm Still Here – Walter Salles, Maria Carlota Bruno, and Rodrigo Teixeira; Kneecap – Rich Peppiatt, Trevor Birney, and Jack Tarling; The Seed of the Sacred Fig – Mohammad Rasoulof and Amin Sadraei	**Best Casting**: **Anora – Sean Baker and Samantha Quan**; The Apprentice – Stephanie Gorin and Carmen Cuba; A Complete Unknown – Yesi Ramirez; Conclave – Nina Gold and Martin Ware; Kneecap – Carla Stronge
**Best Cinematography**: **The Brutalist – Lol Crawley**; Conclave – Stéphane Fontaine; Dune: Part Two – Greig Fraser; Emilia Pérez – Paul Guilhaume; Nosferatu – Jarin Blaschke	**Best Costume Design**: **Wicked – Paul Tazewell**; Blitz – Jacqueline Durran; A Complete Unknown – Arianne Phillips; Conclave – Lisy Christl; Nosferatu – Linda Muir
**Best Editing**: **Conclave – Nick Emerson**; Anora – Sean Baker; Dune: Part Two – Joe Walker; Emilia Pérez – Juliette Welfling; Kneecap – Julian Ulrichs and Chris Gill	**Best Make Up & Hair**: **The Substance – Pierre-Olivier Persin, Stéphanie Guillon, Frédérique Arguello, and Marilyne Scarselli**; Dune: Part Two – Love Larson and Eva von Bahr; Emilia Pérez – Julia Floch Carbonel, Emmanuel Janvier, Jean-Christophe Spadaccini, and Romain Marietti; Nosferatu – David White, Traci Loader, and Suzanne Stokes-Munton; Wicked – Frances Hannon, Laura Blount, Sarah Nuth, and Johanna Nielsen
**Best Original Score**: **The Brutalist – Daniel Blumberg**; Conclave – Volker Bertelmann; Emilia Pérez – Camille and Clément Ducol; Nosferatu – Robin Carolan; The Wild Robot – Kris Bowers	**Best Production Design**: **Wicked – Nathan Crowley and Lee Sandales**; The Brutalist – Judy Becker and Patricia Cuccia; Conclave – Suzie Davies and Cynthia Sleiter; Dune: Part Two – Patrice Vermette and Shane Vieau; Nosferatu – Craig Lathrop and Beatrice Brentnerová
**Best Sound**: **Dune: Part Two – Ron Bartlett, Doug Hemphill, Gareth John, and Richard King**; Blitz – John Casali, Paul Cotterell, and James Harrison; Gladiator II – Stéphane Bucher, Matthew Collinge, Paul Massey, and Danny Sheehan; The Substance – Valérie Deloof, Victor Fleurant, Victor Praud, Stéphane Thiébaut, and Emmanuelle Villard; Wicked – Robin Baynton, Simon Hayes, John Marquis, Andy Nelson, and Nancy Nugent Title	**Best Special Visual Effects**: **Dune: Part Two – Paul Lambert, Stephen James, Gerd Nefzer, and Rhys Salcombe**; Better Man – Luke Millar, David Clayton, Keith Herft, and Peter Stubbs; Gladiator II – Mark Bakowski, Neil Corbould, Nikki Penny, and Pietro Ponti; Kingdom of the Planet of the Apes – Erik Winquist, Rodney Burke, Paul Story, and Stephen Unterfranz; Wicked – Pablo Helman, Paul Corbould, Jonathan Fawkner, and Anthony Smith
**Outstanding British Film**: **Conclave – Edward Berger, Tessa Ross, Juliette Howell, Michael A. Jackman, and Peter Straughan**; Bird – Andrea Arnold, Tessa Ross, Juliette Howell, and Lee Groombridge; Blitz – Steve McQueen, Tim Bevan, Eric Fellner, and Anita Overland; Gladiator II – Ridley Scott, Douglas Wick, Lucy Fisher, Michael Pruss, David Scarpa, and Peter Craig; Hard Truths – Mike Leigh and Georgina Lowe; Kneecap – Rich Peppiatt, Trevor Birney, Jack Tarling, Naoise Ó Cairealláin, Liam Óg Ó Hannaidh, and JJ Ó Dochartaigh; Lee – Ellen Kuras, Kate Solomon, Kate Winslet, Liz Hannah, Marion Hume, John Collee, and Lem Dobbs; Love Lies Bleeding – Rose Glass, Andrea Cornwell, Oliver Kassman, and Weronika Tofilska; The Outrun – Nora Fingscheidt, Sarah Brocklehurst, Dominic Norris, Jack Lowden, Saoirse Ronan, and Amy Liptrot; Wallace & Gromit: Vengeance Most Fowl – Nick Park, Merlin Crossingham, Richard Beek, and Mark Burton	**Outstanding Debut by a British Writer, Director or Producer**: **Kneecap – Rich Peppiatt (Director, Writer)**; Hoard – Luna Carmoon (Director, Writer); Monkey Man – Dev Patel (Director); Santosh – Sandhya Suri (Director, Writer), James Bowsher (Producer), and Balthazar de Ganay (Producer); Sister Midnight – Karan Kandhari (Director, Writer)
**Best British Short Animation**: **Wander to Wonder – Nina Gantz, Stienette Bosklopper, Simon Cartwright, and Maarten Swart**; Adiós – José Prats, Natalia Kyriacou, and Bernardo Angeletti; Mog's Christmas – Robin Shaw, Joanna Harrison, Camilla Deakin, and Ruth Fielding	**Best British Short Film**: **Rock, Paper, Scissors – Franz Böhm, Ivan, and Hayder Rothschild Hoozeer**; The Flowers Stand Silently, Witnessing – Theo Panagopoulos and Marissa Keating; Marion – Joe Weiland, Finn Constantine, and Marija Djikic; Milk – Miranda Stern and Ashionye Ogene; Stomach Bug – Matty Crawford and Karima Sammout-Kanellopoulou
**Best Children's & Family Film**: **Wallace & Gromit: Vengeance Most Fowl – Nick Park, Merlin Crossingham, and Richard Beek**; Flow – Gints Zilbalodis and Matīss Kaža; Kensuke's Kingdom – Kirk Hendry, Neil Boyle, and Camilla Deakin; The Wild Robot – Chris Sanders and Jeff Hermann	**EE Rising Star Award**: **David Jonsson**; Marisa Abela; Jharrel Jerome; Mikey Madison; Nabhaan Rizwan

== Ceremony information ==
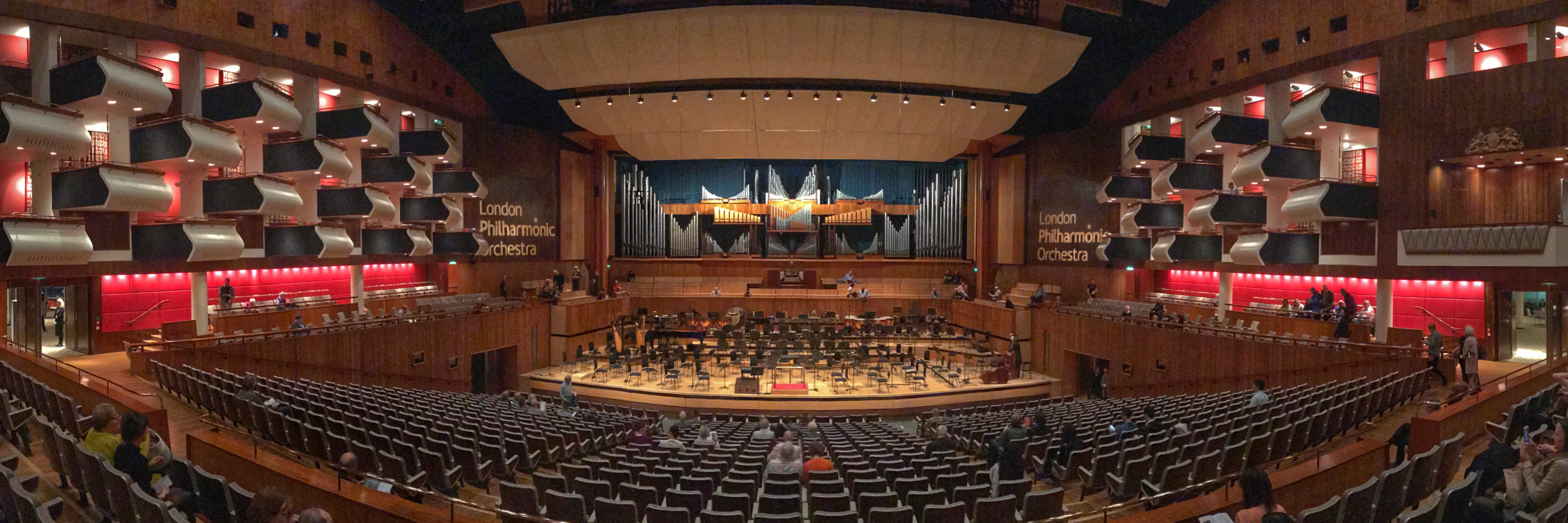
The interior of the Royal Festival Hall, which hosted the ceremony

The ceremony took place at the Royal Festival Hall within London's Southbank Centre on 16 February 2025, hosted by David Tennant for the second year in a row. BAFTA digital channels broadcast pre- and post-ceremony content. The ceremony was broadcast as deferred live, with an approximately one-hour delay, on BBC One in the United Kingdom and on various BritBox platforms internationally. In his introduction to the ceremony, Tennant performed "I'm Gonna Be (500 Miles)" by The Proclaimers before his monologue full of dad jokes; his scripted gags were of a similar tone throughout. Though the ceremony overran significantly, editing kept the broadcast ceremony to a "brisk" two hours.

The Best Children's & Family Film was awarded for the first time in 2025, having been announced in 2023 as the first new category since the introduction of Best Casting in 2020. During the ceremony, Deadline Hollywood suggested there was "a little too much overlap" between it and the Best Animated Film category. Other changes to the awards for 2025 include the introduction of new requirements for nomination to the Best Film and Outstanding British Film categories.

The nominees in 2025 made it the most genre-diverse ceremony, with horror and musicals well-represented among more traditional award ceremony genres. In terms of individual nominees, Anora filmmaker Sean Baker earned the second-most nominations for an individual at a single ceremony with five (Best Film, Best Director, Best Original Screenplay, Best Casting, and Best Editing) and filmmaker Rich Peppiatt became the most-nominated debut director at the BAFTAs with four personal nominations for Kneecap.

During the technical awards, the ceremony sound cut out as Best Sound was presented, though this was fixed for broadcast. Multiple winners were noted for their lack of acceptance speech preparation and the endearingly rambling comments they made instead, including Nick Park (for Wallace & Gromit: Vengeance Most Fowl) and Jesse Eisenberg (for A Real Pain). Ahead of the acting and other major awards being announced, Take That performed their song "Greatest Day", which featured prominently in nominee Anora. Two awards later, the first of two montages of other awards to not receive as-live broadcasts was shown; this included Emilia Pérez winning Best Film Not in the English Language, the clip notably cutting out director Jacques Audiard paying tribute to controversial star Karla Sofía Gascón in his speech. Winners considered surprising were David Jonsson for the EE Rising Star Award and Mikey Madison winning Best Actress in a Leading Role, while A Complete Unknown failing to win any of its six nominations was considered a surprising snub. Favourites in the supporting performance categories, Zoe Saldaña (for Emilia Pérez) and Kieran Culkin (for A Real Pain) won their categories, which was said to make them all but guaranteed to win at the 97th Academy Awards.

There were relatively few political comments made at the ceremony, with Tennant making jokes about Donald Trump—though some, including comparing Trump to the character Beetlejuice, as well as jokes about Conclave, were cut from the broadcast; Peppiatt saying that everyone "should have their language respected, their culture respected and their homeland respected"; and Edward Berger accepting Outstanding British Film for Conclave by vaguely referring to elections in Germany and describing the time as "a crisis of democracy". When presenting Best Film, Mark Hamill referred to "troubling times" before deliberately not naming Trump. In reference to which comments were cut, the BBC stated editing decisions were "made due to time constraints".

== In Memoriam ==
The In Memoriam was accompanied by actor Jeff Goldblum, performing "As Time Goes By" on piano, and paid tribute to the following:

- Alain Delon – actor, producer
- Anouk Aimée – actress
- Samantha Davis – actress
- Pat Heywood – actress
- John Amos – actor
- Louis Gossett Jr. – actor
- Mitzi Gaynor – actress, dancer, singer
- Reuben Barnes – projectionist, technical manager
- Phyllis Dalton – costume designer
- James Earl Jones – actor
- Shelley Duvall – actress
- Jim Abrahams – director, writer
- Roger Corman – director, producer, actor
- Jenne Casarotto – agent
- Lynda Obst – producer
- Teri Garr – actress
- Donald Sutherland – actor
- James Hambidge – art director, production designer
- Ray Chan – art director, production designer
- Robert Towne – writer
- Jon Landau – producer
- Kris Kristofferson – actor, musician
- Gena Rowlands – actress
- Dame Joan Plowright – actress
- Lisa Westcott – make up & hair designer
- Loulia Sheppard – hair designer
- Paul Engelen – make up designer
- Robert Watts – producer, production manager
- Adam Somner – producer, assistant director
- Norman Spencer – producer, production manager
- David Korda – producer, financier
- Dick Pope – cinematographer
- Roger Pratt – cinematographer
- David Lynch – director
- Dame Maggie Smith – actress

== Statistics ==
Films that received multiple nominations
Nominations	Film
12	Conclave
11	Emilia Pérez
9	The Brutalist
7	Anora (Note: If counting Mikey Madison's EE Rising Star Award nomination, Anora would have received eight nominations)
7	Dune: Part Two
7	Wicked
6	A Complete Unknown
6	Kneecap
5	Nosferatu
5	The Substance
3	The Apprentice
3	Blitz
3	Gladiator II
3	Sing Sing
3	Wallace & Gromit: Vengeance Most Fowl
3	The Wild Robot
2	Flow
2	Hard Truths
2	The Outrun
2	A Real Pain

Films that received multiple awards
Awards	Film
4	The Brutalist
4	Conclave
2	Anora
2	Dune: Part Two
2	Emilia Pérez
2	A Real Pain
2	Wallace & Gromit: Vengeance Most Fowl
2	Wicked

== See also ==
- 14th AACTA International Awards
- 97th Academy Awards
- 52nd Annie Awards
- 13th Canadian Screen Awards
- 50th César Awards
- 30th Critics' Choice Awards
- 77th Directors Guild of America Awards
- 82nd Golden Globe Awards
- 45th Golden Raspberry Awards
- 39th Goya Awards
- 40th Independent Spirit Awards
- 30th Lumière Awards
- 14th Magritte Awards
- 12th Platino Awards
- 36th Producers Guild of America Awards
- 29th Satellite Awards
- 52nd Saturn Awards
- 31st Screen Actors Guild Awards
- 77th Writers Guild of America Awards
