= 36th Producers Guild of America Awards =

36th Annual Producers Guild Awards
- Date: February 8, 2025
- Location: Fairmont Century Plaza, Los Angeles, California
- Country: United States
- Presented by: Producers Guild of America

Highlights
- Best Producer(s) Motion Picture: Anora – Samantha Quan, Alex Coco, and Sean Baker
- Best Producer(s) Animated Feature: The Wild Robot – Jeff Hermann
- Best Producer(s) Documentary Motion Picture: Super/Man: The Christopher Reeve Story – Lizzie Gillett, Robert Ford, and Ian Bonhôte

The 36th Producers Guild of America Awards (also known as 2025 Producers Guild Awards or 2025 PGA Awards), honoring the best film and television producers of 2024, were held at the Fairmont Century Plaza in Los Angeles, California on February 8, 2025. The nominees in the documentary category were announced on December 10, 2024, and the nominations in the sports, children's and short-form categories were announced on December 13, 2024. The announcement of the remaining nominations for film and television was originally scheduled for January 10, 2025, but postponed twice due to the January 2025 Southern California wildfires, and those nominations were ultimately announced on January 16, 2025. The finalists for the PGA Innovation Award were announced on November 14, 2024.

The PGA Innovation Award was presented on February 6, 2025, during the PGA nominees event in Los Angeles.

== Winners and nominees ==
=== Film ===
Darryl F. Zanuck Award for Outstanding Producer of Theatrical Motion Pictures
- Anora – Samantha Quan, Alex Coco, and Sean Baker
  - The Brutalist – Nick Gordon, Brian Young, Andrew Morrison, D.J. Gugenheim, and Brady Corbet
  - A Complete Unknown – Fred Berger, Alex Heineman, and James Mangold
  - Conclave – Tessa Ross, Juliette Howell, and Michael A. Jackman
  - Dune: Part Two – Mary Parent, Cale Boyter, Denis Villeneuve, and Tanya Lapointe
  - Emilia Pérez – Pascal Caucheteux and Jacques Audiard
  - A Real Pain – Ali Herting and Jesse Eisenberg
  - September 5 – Philipp Trauer, Thomas Wöbke, Tim Fehlbaum, John Ira Palmer, and John Wildermuth
  - The Substance – Coralie Fargeat, Tim Bevan, and Eric Fellner
  - Wicked – Marc Platt
Outstanding Producer of Documentary Theatrical Motion Pictures
- Super/Man: The Christopher Reeve Story – Lizzie Gillett, Robert Ford, and Ian Bonhôte
  - Gaucho Gaucho – Michael Dweck and Gregory Kershaw
  - Mediha – Hasan Oswald, Annelise Mecca, and Fahrinisa Campana
  - Mountain Queen: The Summits of Lhakpa Sherpa – Michael D. Ratner, Miranda Sherman, Dalia Burde, and Christopher Newman
  - Porcelain War – Aniela Sidorska and Paula DuPré Pesmen
  - We Will Dance Again
Outstanding Producer of Animated Theatrical Motion Pictures
- The Wild Robot – Jeff Hermann
  - Flow – Matīss Kaža, Ron Dyens, Gints Zilbalodis, and Gregory Zalcman
  - Inside Out 2 – Mark Nielsen
  - Moana 2 – Yvett Merino and Christina Chen
  - Wallace & Gromit: Vengeance Most Fowl – Richard Beek

=== Television ===
Norman Felton Award for Outstanding Producer of Episodic Television, Drama
- Shōgun (FX)
  - Bad Sisters (Apple TV+)
  - The Diplomat (Netflix)
  - Fallout (Prime Video)
  - Slow Horses (Apple TV+)
Danny Thomas Award for Outstanding Producer of Episodic Television, Comedy
- Hacks (Max)
  - Abbott Elementary (ABC)
  - The Bear (FX / Hulu)
  - Curb Your Enthusiasm (HBO)
  - Only Murders in the Building (Hulu)
David L. Wolper Award for Outstanding Producer of Limited or Anthology Series Television
- Baby Reindeer (Netflix)
  - Feud: Capote vs. The Swans (FX)
  - The Penguin (HBO)
  - Ripley (Netflix)
  - True Detective: Night Country (HBO)
Outstanding Producer of Streamed or Televised Motion Pictures
- The Greatest Night in Pop (Netflix)
  - Carry-On (Netflix)
  - The Killer (Peacock)
  - Rebel Ridge (Netflix)
  - Unfrosted (Netflix)
Outstanding Producer of Non-Fiction Television
- Steve! (Martin) a documentary in 2 pieces (Apple TV+)
  - 30 for 30 (ESPN)
  - Conan O'Brien Must Go (Max)
  - The Jinx (HBO)
  - Welcome to Wrexham (FX)
Outstanding Producer of Game & Competition Television
- The Traitors (Peacock)
  - The Amazing Race (CBS)
  - RuPaul's Drag Race (MTV)
  - Top Chef (Bravo)
  - The Voice (NBC)
Outstanding Producer of Live Entertainment, Variety, Sketch, Standup & Talk Television
- Saturday Night Live (NBC)
  - Ali Wong: Single Lady (Netflix)
  - The Daily Show (Comedy Central)
  - Last Week Tonight with John Oliver (HBO)
  - The Late Show with Stephen Colbert (CBS)
Outstanding Sports Program
- Simone Biles Rising (Netflix)
  - Formula 1: Drive to Survive (Netflix)
  - Hard Knocks: Offseason with the New York Giants (HBO)
  - Messi's World Cup: The Rise of a Legend (Apple TV+)
  - Triumph: Jesse Owens and the Berlin Olympics (History Channel)
Outstanding Children's Program
- Sesame Street (Max)
  - Avatar: The Last Airbender (Netflix)
  - Fraggle Rock: Back to the Rock (Apple TV+)
  - Percy Jackson and the Olympians (Disney+)
  - SpongeBob SquarePants (Nickelodeon)
Outstanding Short-Form Program
- Shōgun – The Making of Shōgun (FX)
  - The Crown: Farewell To A Royal Epic (Netflix)
  - Hacks: Bit By Bit (Max)
  - The Penguin: Inside Gotham (HBO)
  - Real Time with Bill Maher: Overtime (HBO)

=== PGA Innovation Award ===
PGA Innovation Award
- Orbital (Cosm Studios / Planetary Collective / Kuva)
  - Critterz (Native Foreign)
  - Emperor (Atlas V / Reynard Films / France Télévisions)
  - Impulse: Playing with Reality (Anagram / Floréal / France Télévisions)
  - The Pirate Queen with Lucy Liu (Singer Studios)
  - What If...? – An Immersive Story (Marvel Studios / ILM Immersive / Disney+)

=== David O. Selznick Achievement Award in Theatrical Motion Pictures ===
- Chris Meledandri

=== Milestone Award ===
- Dana Walden

=== Norman Lear Achievement Award in Television ===
- Taika Waititi

=== Trailblazer Award ===
- Lynda Obst and Paula Weinstein
