= Carlos Diehz =

Mexican actor (born 1971)

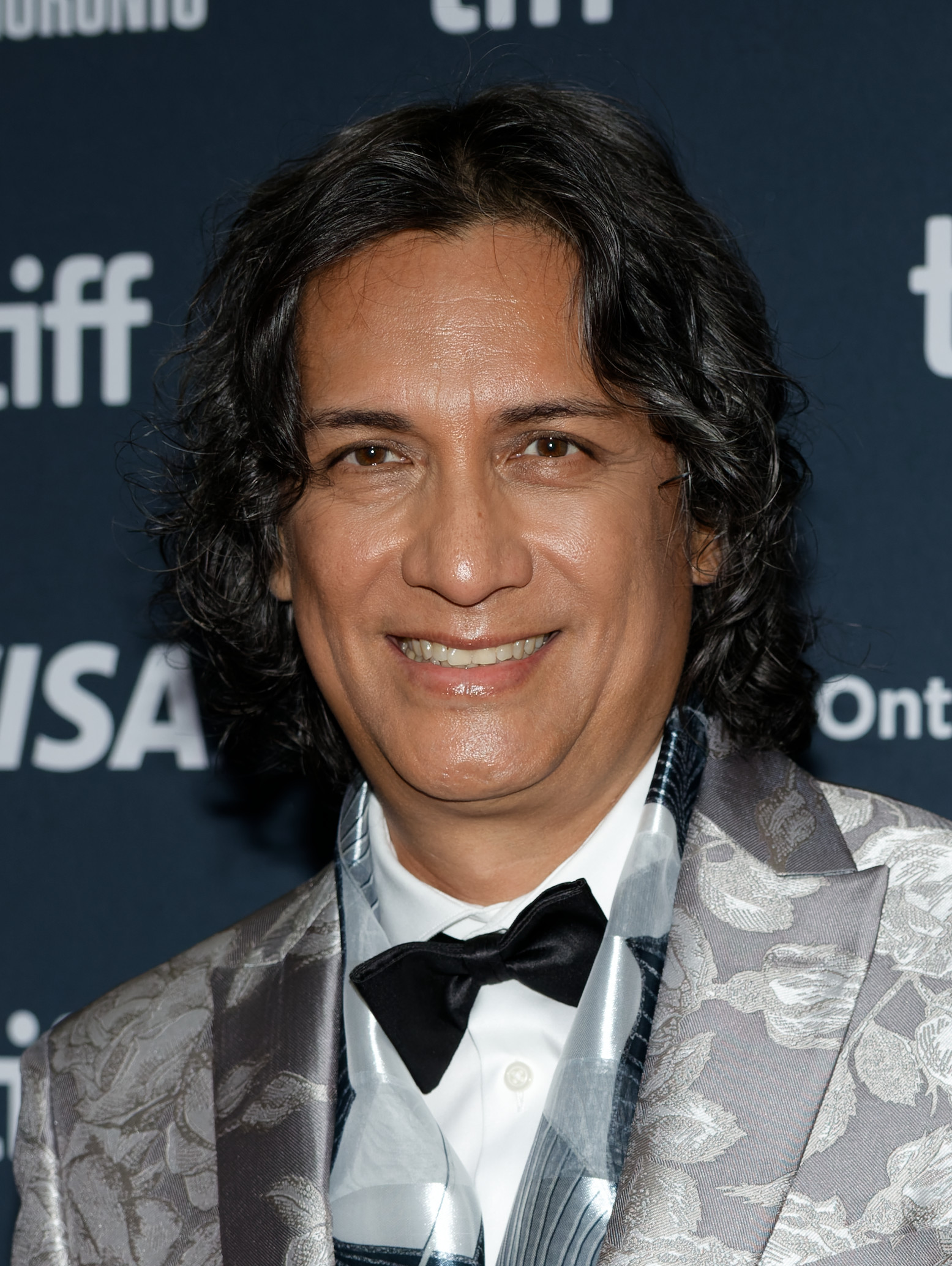
- Diehz at the 2024 Toronto International Film Festival
- Born: March 18, 1971 (age 55); Mexico City, Mexico
- Citizenship: Canada
- Occupations: Actor; Architect
- Years active: 2021–present (actor)
- Notable work: Conclave

Carlos Diehz (born March 18, 1971) is a Mexican actor and architect. He is best known for his breakout role as Cardinal Benítez in the 2024 film Conclave.

== Early life and career ==
Carlos Diehz was born on 18 March 1971 in Mexico City and spent much of his early life interested in the arts, including drawing, painting, and singing. Despite an interest in acting during high school, he hesitated to pursue it due to shyness. He worked as an architect for over 30 years, relocating to Canada in 2009, where he settled in Vancouver, British Columbia.

== Acting career ==
Diehz starred in two student short films, The Vegan Vampire and It Gets Dark Too Early. Diehz's breakthrough role came in Conclave, a papal thriller by Edward Berger. The global casting search, led by Nina Gold, culminated in Diehz being cast as Cardinal Benitez after a series of auditions in 2022. Cardinal Benítez, the character that he portrayed in the film was originally a Filipino in the novel the film was based on, and was changed to a Mexican in the film adaptation to better reflect Diehz. During production, he received mentorship from co-stars such as Ralph Fiennes and John Lithgow, who offered advice on acting techniques and managing stage fright.

== Personal life ==
Diehz is married and lives in Vancouver. In 2020, Diehz enrolled in online acting workshops during the COVID-19 pandemic. Initially considering acting as a hobby, he committed to acting seriously after advice from his instructors. Diehz continues to work in architecture alongside his acting career.

== Filmography ==
Year	Title	Role	Notes
2021	Coming-Off-Age	Man	Short film
2022	The Vegan Vampire	Diego	Short film
2022	It Gets Dark Too Early	Chrysanthemum	Short film
2024	Conclave	Vincent Benitez	

== Awards and nominations ==
Year	Awards	Category	Nominated work	Result	Ref.
2025	Critics' Choice Movie Awards	Best Acting Ensemble	Conclave	Won	
2025	Screen Actors Guild Awards	Outstanding Performance by a Cast in a Motion Picture	Conclave	Won	
2025	Palm Springs International Film Festival	Best Ensemble	Conclave	Won	
2025	North Carolina Film Critics Association Awards	Best Breakthrough Performance	Conclave	Won	
2025	Gold Derby Awards	Best Ensemble Cast	Conclave	Nominated	
2025	Imagen Awards	Best Supporting Actor	Conclave	Nominated	
2025	North Dakota Film Society Awards	Best Ensemble Cast	Conclave	Nominated	
