= Pope Innocent =

Pope Innocent may refer to:

== Real popes ==
- Pope Innocent I (saint; 401–417)
- Pope Innocent II (1130–1143)
  - Antipope Innocent III (1179–1180)
- Pope Innocent III (1198–1216)
- Pope Innocent IV (1243–1254)
- Pope Innocent V (blessed; 1276)
- Pope Innocent VI (1352–1362)
- Pope Innocent VII (1404–1406)
- Pope Innocent VIII (1484–1492)
- Pope Innocent IX (1591)
- Pope Innocent X (1644–1655)
- Pope Innocent XI (blessed; 1676–1689)
- Pope Innocent XII (1691–1700)
- Pope Innocent XIII (1721–1724)

== In fiction ==
- Cardinal Vincent Benítez chooses the papal name Innocent XIV in the 2016 novel Conclave and its 2024 film adaptation
