= Sweetsick =

Upcoming film by Alice Birch

- Directed by: Alice Birch
- Screenplay by: Alice Birch
- Produced by: Tessa Ross; Juliette Howell; Theo Barrowclough; Cate Blanchett; Lee Groombridge
- Starring: Cate Blanchett; Spike Fearn
- Cinematography: Michał Dymek
- Production companies: House Productions; Dirty Films; Film4
- Distributed by: Searchlight Pictures
- Countries: United Kingdom; Australia
- Language: English

Sweetsick is a drama film written and directed by Alice Birch in her directorial debut. It stars Cate Blanchett and Spike Fearn.

== Premise ==
A woman (Cate Blanchett) with the ability to see what others need, often at personal cost, sets out on a journey home.

== Cast ==
- Cate Blanchett as Eleanor
- Spike Fearn
- Tilly Walker as Eleanor's daughter
- Kate O'Flynn

== Production ==
In September 2025, it was announced that writer Alice Birch would make her directorial debut, with Cate Blanchett and Spike Fearn starring, and Searchlight Pictures acquiring the worldwide distribution rights.

Principal photography began in October 2025, in the United Kingdom and Greece.
