= Juliette Howell =

English film producer

- Occupation: Film producer

Juliette Howell is an English film producer. She won two British Academy Film Awards and was nominated for two more in the categories Best Film and Outstanding British Film for the films The Wonder, Conclave and Bird.

At the 97th Academy Awards, she was nominated for an Academy Award in the category Best Picture. Her nomination was shared with Tessa Ross and Michael A. Jackman.

== Selected filmography ==
- The Wonder (2022)
- Conclave (2024)
- Bird (2024)
- Sweetsick (TBA)
