= Conclave (film) =

2024 film by Edward Berger

- U.S. theatrical release poster
- Directed by: Edward Berger
- Screenplay by: Peter Straughan
- Based on: Conclave by Robert Harris
- Produced by: Tessa Ross; Juliette Howell; Michael Jackman; Alice Dawson; Robert Harris
- Starring: Ralph Fiennes; Carlos Diehz; Sergio Castellitto; Stanley Tucci; John Lithgow; Lucian Msamati; Isabella Rossellini
- Cinematography: Stéphane Fontaine
- Edited by: Nick Emerson
- Music by: Volker Bertelmann
- Production companies: FilmNation Entertainment; Indian Paintbrush; House Productions
- Distributed by: Black Bear UK (United Kingdom); Focus Features (United States); FilmNation Entertainment (International)
- Release dates: 30 August 2024 (Telluride); 25 October 2024 (United States); 29 November 2024 (United Kingdom)
- Running time: 120 minutes
- Countries: United Kingdom; United States
- Languages: English; Italian; Latin; Spanish
- Budget: $20 million
- Box office: $128 million

Conclave is a 2024 political thriller film directed by Edward Berger and written by Peter Straughan, based on the 2016 novel by Robert Harris. The film stars Ralph Fiennes, Stanley Tucci, John Lithgow, Sergio Castellitto, and Isabella Rossellini. In the film, Cardinal Thomas Lawrence (Fiennes) organizes a conclave to elect the next pope and finds himself investigating secrets and scandals about the major candidates.

After premiering at the 51st Telluride Film Festival on 30 August 2024, Conclave was released in theaters in the United States by Focus Features on 25 October 2024 and in the United Kingdom by Black Bear UK on 29 November 2024, with FilmNation Entertainment handling international sales. The film received positive reviews from critics, who praised the performances, directing, screenplay, and cinematography. The film has grossed $128 million worldwide on a $20 million production budget. The film experienced a resurgence in popularity following the death of Pope Francis in April 2025 and the subsequent conclave in May that resulted in the election of Pope Leo XIV, who reportedly saw the film.

Conclave was named one of the top ten films of 2024 by the National Board of Review and the American Film Institute. Among other accolades, it won four awards at the 78th British Academy Film Awards (tying The Brutalist for most of the ceremony), including Best Film, and also won the Golden Globe Award for Best Screenplay and the Screen Actors Guild Award for Outstanding Performance by a Cast in a Motion Picture. At the 97th Academy Awards, it received eight nominations, including Best Picture, and won Best Adapted Screenplay.

== Plot ==
After the pope's fatal heart attack, the College of Cardinals, under the leadership of its dean, Cardinal Thomas Lawrence of the United Kingdom, convenes to elect a successor. Four cardinals emerge as likely candidates: Aldo Bellini of the United States, a progressive reformer; Joshua Adeyemi of Nigeria, a social conservative; Joseph Tremblay of Canada, a moderate; and Goffredo Tedesco of Italy, a staunch traditionalist.

Archbishop Janusz Woźniak, the prefect of the papal household, tells Cardinal Lawrence the pope demanded Tremblay's resignation, which Tremblay denies. Bellini, meanwhile, tells supporters his goal is to prevent Tedesco from winning the papacy. Lawrence is surprised by the last-minute arrival of Mexican-born Archbishop Vincent Benítez of Kabul, whom the pope named cardinal in pectore the previous year. (Note: Under canon law, it would have been illegal for Benítez to attend, as in pectore appointments end with the pope's death unless the pope has publicly announced the appointment. The novel attributes Benítez's presence to the late pope's revision of this law, although the film does not mention the change.)

On the first day, Lawrence opens the deliberations by encouraging the college to embrace uncertainty, an act some interpret as a sign of Lawrence's papal ambition. No one obtains the two-thirds majority necessary to win, although Adeyemi leads Tedesco and Tremblay, and Bellini and Lawrence split the progressive vote. Monsignor Raymond O'Malley, Lawrence's assistant, discovers the pope paid for Benítez to be flown to Geneva for a medical appointment that Benítez later canceled.

On the second day, the college witnesses an altercation between Adeyemi and Sister Shanumi, a Nigerian nun recently transferred to Vatican City. Lawrence speaks with Shanumi, who confesses to a past illicit relationship with Adeyemi that resulted in a son she gave up for adoption. Adeyemi confirms the story when pressed. Though Lawrence is bound to secrecy, a whisper campaign derails Adeyemi's candidacy.

Working with Sister Agnes, the acting head caterer and housekeeper, Lawrence discovers that Tremblay arranged for Shanumi's transfer. When confronted, Tremblay claims that he did so at the pope's request. Lawrence enters the pope's sealed apartment and finds documents indicating Tremblay paid cardinals for votes. He shows the documents to Bellini, whose plea to conceal their existence sparks an argument.

On the third day, Lawrence and Agnes publicize Tremblay's actions, effectively removing him from contention. Lawrence reconciles with Bellini and agrees to oppose Tedesco. During deliberations, as Lawrence is about to vote for himself, an explosion damages the Sistine Chapel. The college later learns that the explosion was part of a series of suicide bombings carried out by Islamic terrorists across Europe.

Tedesco launches into a tirade against Islam and calls for a religious war. Cardinal Benítez rebukes him, drawing on firsthand experience of religious violence in Afghanistan, arguing against fighting violence with violence and chastising everyone for prioritizing political agendas over their religious mission. Voting resumes, and the college overwhelmingly elects Benítez, who chooses the papal name Innocent XIV.

Lawrence is initially enthusiastic until O'Malley privately reveals the circumstances behind Benítez's canceled medical appointment. He confronts the now-Pope Innocent, who confesses to being born with a uterus and ovaries, a fact he learned during an appendectomy. The appointment was for a laparoscopic hysterectomy that he decided against, choosing to remain as God made him. Lawrence wanders the Vatican grounds, listening to the crowds cheer Pope Innocent's election, then returns to his room and watches three young nuns chattering in the courtyard below his window.

== Cast ==
- Ralph Fiennes as Cardinal Thomas Lawrence, a British liberal and the Dean of the College of Cardinals.
- Stanley Tucci as Cardinal Aldo Bellini, an Italian-American progressive reformer, former Archbishop of Milan and the late pope's Secretary of State. Bellini's failure to gain election, despite being the early favorite, is based on Carlo Maria Martini's experiences during the 2005 papal conclave.
- John Lithgow as Cardinal Joseph Tremblay, a Canadian moderate and Archbishop Emeritus of Quebec.
- Lucian Msamati as Cardinal Joshua Adeyemi, a Nigerian member of the Apostolic Penitentiary and former Archbishop of Lagos with social conservative views.
- Brían F. O'Byrne as Monsignor Raymond O'Malley, the Secretary of the College of Cardinals who acts as Lawrence's assistant and researcher.
- Carlos Diehz as Cardinal Vincent Benitez, the Mexican Archbishop of Kabul and eventual Pope Innocent XIV.
- Sergio Castellitto as Cardinal Goffredo Tedesco, the traditionalist Patriarch of Venice.
- Jacek Koman as Archbishop Janusz Woźniak, the Prefect of the Papal Household and the late pope's confidant.
- Isabella Rossellini as Sister Agnes of the Daughters of Charity of Saint Vincent de Paul, the cardinals' housekeeper at the Domus Sanctae Marthae and head caterer.
- Balkissa Maiga as Sister Shanumi, a Nigerian nun of the Daughters of Charity and former mistress of Cardinal Adeyemi.
- Merab Ninidze as Cardinal Giulio Sabbadin.
- Thomas Loibl as Archbishop Wilhelm Mandorff.
- Loris Loddi as Cardinal Modesto Villanueva.
- Roberto Citran as Cardinal Lombardi.
- Bruno Novelli as the deceased Pope.

== Production ==
It was announced in May 2022 that Ralph Fiennes, John Lithgow, Stanley Tucci, and Isabella Rossellini were set to star in the film, with Edward Berger directing. Steven Rales served as one of the executive producers, co-financing the film via his production company, Indian Paintbrush. Additional casting was announced in January 2023 as production began in Rome. Filming also took place at Cinecittà. Filming concluded in March.

The set designers took great care to replicate the Sistine Chapel, though they took some artistic licence with the Domus Sanctae Marthae. They made their set more prison-like to enhance dramatic tension because they felt that the real version was rather dull. Costume designers visited Gammarelli, Tirelli Costumi, and several museums in Rome as part of their research. For the cardinals' red attire, costume designer Lisy Christl opted for a hue used in 17th-century cardinal vestments, rather than the scarlet one from modern-day ones, believing it be "far more beautiful and far easier for our eyes". While writing the screenplay, Peter Straughan said that he met with a cardinal to discuss the logistics of the conclave. He also took a private tour of the Vatican, and said he did not feel hostility while there and felt that the Vatican had been open to him.

== Soundtrack ==
German composer Volker Bertelmann composed the score to Conclave, his fifth collaboration with Berger. In an interview with IndieWire, Bertelmann discussed developing a sound that was neither "too ecclesiastical [nor] classical", leading to experimentation with lesser-known instruments. As a result, much of the score makes use of the Cristal Baschet, a crystallophone played using wet hands. A similar approach was used for Bertelmann's score for Berger's All Quiet on the Western Front (2022), where a harmonium was used.

Due to many characters sharing scenes in the film, Bertelmann chose to create themes for specific situations as opposed to themes for individual characters. In addition, he had string players use a ricochet bowing technique. In order to mirror the film's conflicting factions within the cardinals, Bertelmann sometimes incorporated polyrhythms, such as triplets against sixteenth notes.

== Release ==
In August 2022, distributor Black Bear Pictures acquired the UK rights to the film from FilmNation Entertainment via its newly founded British subsidiary, serving as one of its first acquisitions and maiden releases. Black Bear's subsidiary company Elevation Pictures also handled the film's Canadian release.

In November 2023, Focus Features acquired U.S. distribution rights to the film. In July 2024, Conclave was announced as part of the Special Presentations section for the 2024 Toronto International Film Festival scheduled for 8 September 2024. The film would subsequently be announced as part of the lineup for the Telluride Film Festival, where it had its world premiere. It was also screened at the 68th BFI London Film Festival on 10 October 2024. Venice Film Festival director Alberto Barbera explained why the film did not play at Venice: "I didn't think it was a Competition film for Venice but I invited it Out of Competition. We tried to figure out timing for it to play here and at Telluride, which they also wanted, but we couldn't find the right dates and timing for it to work. We discussed various options but couldn't get the time that suited everyone. It's a shame."

The film was released in the United States on 25 October 2024. It was previously scheduled for a limited theatrical release on 1 November before opening wide on the following week. It was released in the United Kingdom on 29 November.

=== Home release ===
The film was released on Blu-ray on December 17, 2024, followed by a 4K release on February 11, 2025.

The film became available on Amazon Prime Video on 22 April 2025, one day after the death of Pope Francis, after its earlier release window on streaming service Peacock from 13 December 2024 until April 2025.

== Reception ==
=== Box office ===
As of 13 December 2025, Conclave has grossed worldwide total of $128 million with just over a quarter of this coming from the Canada and United States having a gross take of $32.5 million. Deadline Hollywood calculated the film made a net profit of $15 million after all ancillaries.

In the United States and Canada, Conclave was released alongside Venom: The Last Dance, and was projected to gross $4–6 million from 1,753 theatres in its opening weekend. The film made $2.5 million on its first day, including $500,000 from Thursday night previews. It went on to debut to $6.6 million, finishing in third. The film drew significantly older audiences. 77% of viewers were over 35 years old, with the largest demographic group being those over 55 at 44%, and 67% identifying as Caucasian. The film then made $5 million in its second weekend (dropping 23.7%) and $4.1 million in its third weekend (dropping just 18.1%), finishing in fourth and sixth place, respectively.

=== Critical response ===
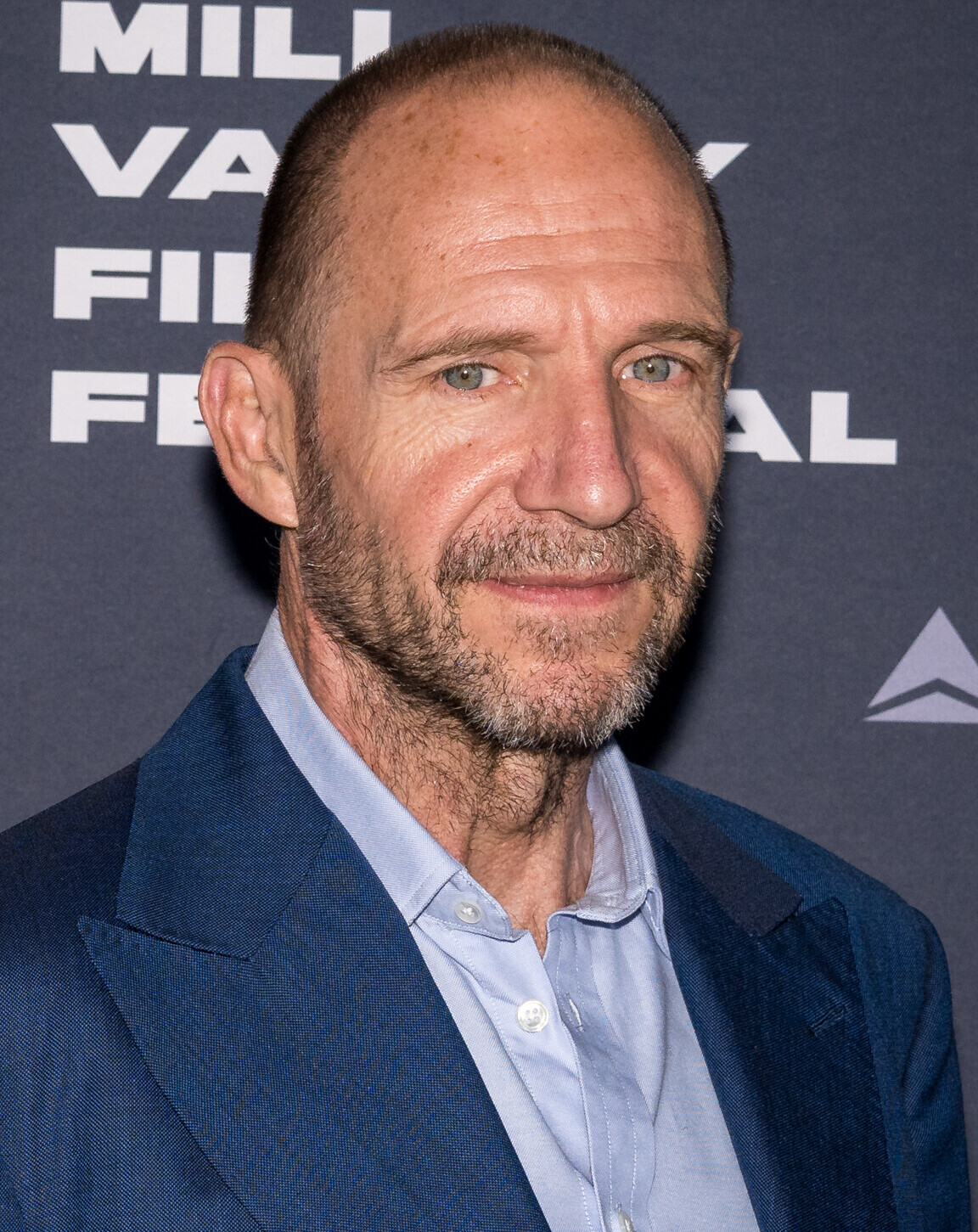
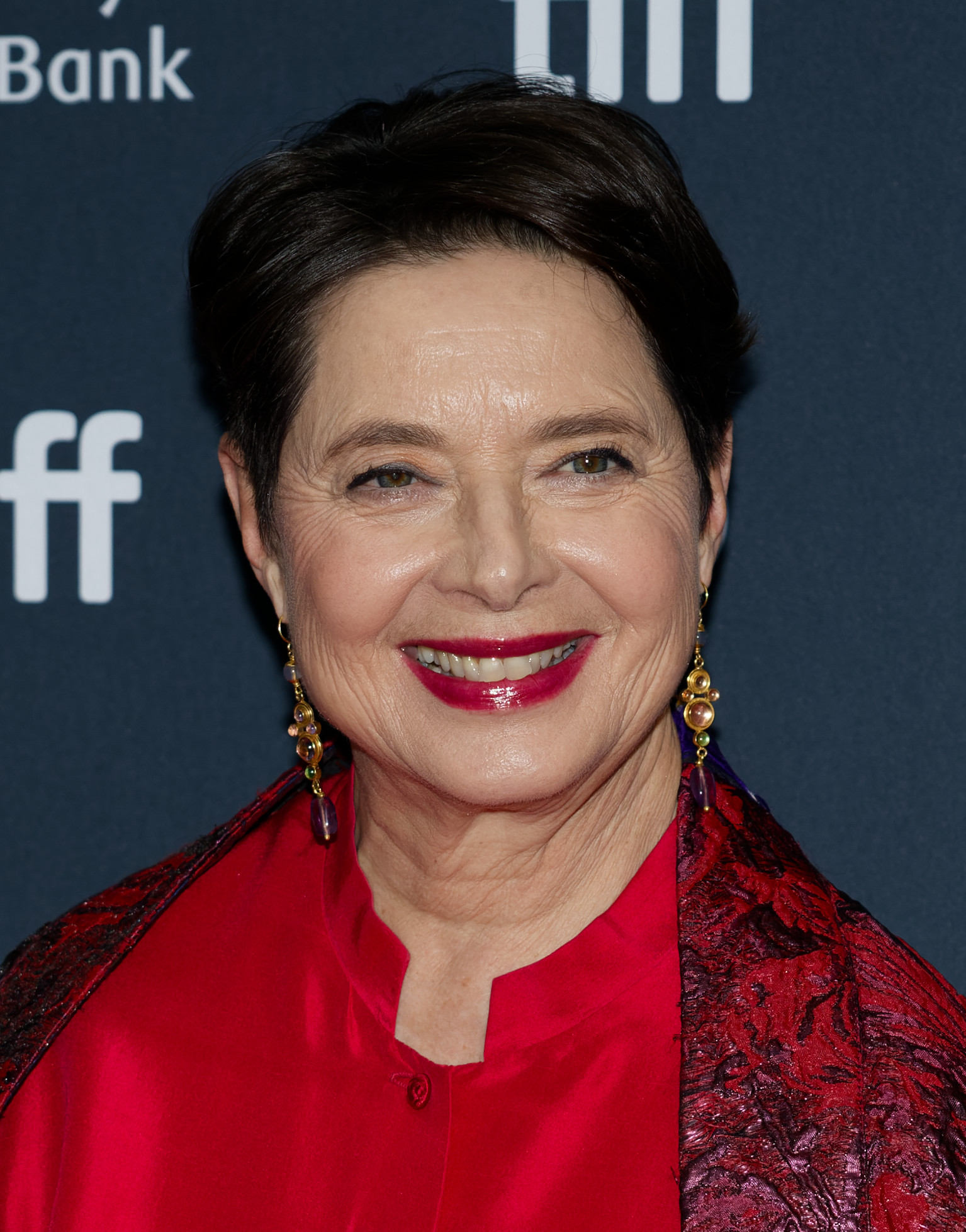
Ralph Fiennes and Isabella Rossellini garnered critical acclaim for their performances and earned Academy Award nominations for Best Actor and Best Supporting Actress.

On the review aggregator website Rotten Tomatoes, 93% of 338 critics' reviews are positive, with an average rating of 8.1/10. The website's consensus reads: "Carrying off papal pulp with immaculate execution and career-highlight work from Ralph Fiennes, Conclave is a godsend for audiences who crave intelligent entertainment." Metacritic, which uses a weighted average, assigned the film a score of 79 out of 100, based on 54 critics, indicating "generally favorable" reviews. Audiences polled by CinemaScore gave the film an average grade of "B+" on an A+ to F scale, while those surveyed by PostTrak gave it an 84% overall positive score, with 62% saying they would "definitely recommend" it.

The film's cinematography and ensemble cast were widely praised; however, some criticism was met for the plot, with Katie Walsh of the Los Angeles Times calling it "a pretty thin and silly mystery ... that seems like it's deeper than it actually is". IndieWire's David Ehrlich agreed that the film was "very silly but wonderfully staged ... even if the film might be a bit too convinced of its own dramatic import". The Chicago Tribune's Michael Phillips praised the film's "delicious portraits in pursuit, deceit and evasion".

Mark Kermode praised the film for what he saw as a thoughtful and respectful portrayal of the papal election process. He highlighted the strong performances, particularly by Fiennes, and said that the film created suspense and intrigue without resorting to sensationalism. He also noted the nuanced exploration of the Catholic Church's future and its internal politics, which he found compelling and well-executed. Richard Lawson of Vanity Fair said that the film rightly portrayed "both the seriousness of [the conclave] process and the campy ridiculousness of it", and thought that the film "touch[es] fingers with prestige greatness while keeping its feet firmly planted in the realm of rollicking entertainment". Lawson called the final twist "reckless" and insufficiently thought through, while Variety's Peter Debruge called it "one of the most satisfying twists in years, a Hail Mary that both surprises and restores one's faith (maybe not everyone's, but certainly that of the disillusioned)". Manohla Dargis of The New York Times noted that the film's stance towards the Catholic Church mirrors Hollywood's own stance towards its film industry: "lightly cynical, self-flattering and finally myth-stoking". Writing in The Guardian, Benjamin Lee opined that the film was "a glossily transferred airport novel first and a deeper drama about the world of religion second", awarding it four stars out of five. The Observer's Wendy Ide praised Fiennes' performance as "one of the performances of the year", concluding "Conclave is a blast" and giving it five stars out of five. Neil Young, reviewing the film for the BFI, praised the "outstanding" ensemble cast but was less positive on the score, feeling it was unrestrained, "doing much of the creative heavy-lifting" and turning the film into a "rather clangorous affair."

Filmmaker Alexander Payne named it one of his favorite films of 2024, saying: "You just can't believe how riveting it is – funny and suspenseful and so well-cast and well-acted. Berger has the miraculous quality of making something you never forget is a movie, but at the same time, it's as though you're actually there." Other filmmakers, including Oliver Stone, Kelly Fremon Craig, Adam Elliot, Coralie Fargeat, Tim Fehlbaum, Hannah Fidell, William Goldenberg, Reinaldo Marcus Green, Savanah Leaf, Laurel Parmet, Paul Schrader and Denis Villeneuve, also lauded the film, particularly the performances of the cast. In July 2025, it was one of the films voted for the "Readers' Choice" edition of The New York Times' list of "The 100 Best Movies of the 21st Century", finishing at number 194.

==== Nigeria ====
Otosirieze Obi-Young, writing for Nigerian magazine Open Country Mag, argued that the portrayal of Adeyemi is problematic for playing into racist stereotypes of black men being sexually aggressive, and that "Sexual abuse ... has become, in the last few decades, the defining moral damage of Western Catholicism, yet the ahistorical vision of Conclave pins that responsibility not on a cardinal from any of those Western countries but on its sole black African papabile."

=== Religious response ===
The progressive National Catholic Reporter praised Conclave, calling it "a compelling and ecclesial call for a renewed spiritual stewardship characterized by humility, meekness, and, curiously, doubt". Kate Lucky of Christianity Today, an evangelical publication, called the film "gorgeous" and "riveting", and said that "though the film subtly advances progressive convictions, it gives cardinals of all ideological persuasions equal opportunity to fall short". Writing for the Catholic Herald, Miles Pattenden considered that the film "lacks the subtlety to explore [Church politics] inventively" despite some "exquisite moments", notably the performances of Sergio Castellitto and Rossellini. He also criticised its "lack of historical awareness", noting that questions concerning voting eligibility at conclaves and intersex clergy (see Pope Joan and castrated men who became Patriarchs of Constantinople) were "nothing new to the Church".

John Mulderig of the Catholic OSV News said about Conclave that "rival viewpoints within the church are caricatured with a broad brush ... and the deck is predictably stacked in favor of those who advocate change". He warned that "all moviegoers committed to the church's creeds will want to approach this earnest, visually engaging but manipulative—and sometimes sensationalist—production with caution". The Archdiocese of Los Angeles' Angelus magazine praised several of the actors' performances but ultimately dismissed the film, writing: "The problem here is not that it is full of bias against the Catholic Church. The problem is that it is just plain bad. ... At the crucial moment, [Benítez] gives a speech so full of platitudes it could have been written by ChatGPT."

The Bishop of Winona–Rochester, Robert Barron, dismissed it as Oscar bait and termed it "a film about the Catholic Church that could have been written by the editorial board of The New York Times". Sean Fitzpatrick of The Catholic World Report, a conservative publication, agreed with Barron's criticisms, while also criticizing the writing of Benítez's intersex status, opining that the statement "I am what God made me" is a "popular" yet "ridiculous" argument. Father Hugh Mackenzie, of the Roman Catholic Diocese of Westminster, acknowledged Conclave was "a slick drama" and Fiennes "a great actor", but criticised the depiction of doubt as a necessary component of faith, and Cardinal Lawrence's breaking of the seal of confession, as "directly undermining the Catholic faith."

Cardinal Mykola Bychok – Australia's only representative – called the film controversial, especially about prayer: "Have you seen in this movie any of the cardinals pray? Not one time, which is Hollywood style."

=== Accolades ===
Award	Date of Ceremony	Category	Recipient(s)	Result	Ref.
AACTA International Awards	7 February 2025	Best Actor	Ralph Fiennes	Won	
AACTA International Awards	7 February 2025	Best Supporting Actor	Stanley Tucci	Nominated	
AACTA International Awards	7 February 2025	Best Screenplay	Peter Straughan	Nominated	
AARP Movies for Grownups Awards	8 February 2025	Best Picture	Conclave	Nominated	
AARP Movies for Grownups Awards	8 February 2025	Best Director	Edward Berger	Nominated	
AARP Movies for Grownups Awards	8 February 2025	Best Actor	Ralph Fiennes	Nominated	
AARP Movies for Grownups Awards	8 February 2025	Best Supporting Actor	Stanley Tucci	Nominated	
AARP Movies for Grownups Awards	8 February 2025	Best Supporting Actress	Isabella Rossellini	Nominated	
AARP Movies for Grownups Awards	8 February 2025	Best Screenwriter	Peter Straughan	Nominated	
Academy Awards	2 March 2025	Best Picture	Tessa Ross, Juliette Howell, and Michael A. Jackman	Nominated	
Academy Awards	2 March 2025	Best Actor	Ralph Fiennes	Nominated	
Academy Awards	2 March 2025	Best Supporting Actress	Isabella Rossellini	Nominated	
Academy Awards	2 March 2025	Best Adapted Screenplay	Peter Straughan	Won	
Academy Awards	2 March 2025	Best Original Score	Volker Bertelmann	Nominated	
Academy Awards	2 March 2025	Best Editing	Nick Emerson	Nominated	
Academy Awards	2 March 2025	Best Production Design	Production Design: Suzie Davies; Set Decoration: Cynthia Sleiter	Nominated	
Academy Awards	2 March 2025	Best Costume Design	Lisy Christl	Nominated	
Alliance of Women Film Journalists	7 January 2025	Best Film	Conclave	Nominated	
Alliance of Women Film Journalists	7 January 2025	Best Director	Edward Berger	Nominated	
Alliance of Women Film Journalists	7 January 2025	Best Actor	Ralph Fiennes	Nominated	
Alliance of Women Film Journalists	7 January 2025	Best Actor in a Supporting Role	Stanley Tucci	Nominated	
Alliance of Women Film Journalists	7 January 2025	Best Actress in a Supporting Role	Isabella Rossellini	Won	
Alliance of Women Film Journalists	7 January 2025	Best Adapted Screenplay	Peter Straughan	Won	
Alliance of Women Film Journalists	7 January 2025	Best Cinematography	Stéphane Fontaine	Nominated	
Alliance of Women Film Journalists	7 January 2025	Best Editing	Nick Emerson	Nominated	
Alliance of Women Film Journalists	7 January 2025	Best Ensemble Cast and Casting Director	Conclave	Won	
American Cinema Editors Awards	14 March 2025	Best Edited Feature Film (Drama, Theatrical)	Nick Emerson	Nominated	
Artios Awards	12 February 2025	Outstanding Achievement in Casting – Feature Studio or Independent Film (Drama)	Nina Gold, Martin Ware, Francesco Vedovati, Barbara Giordani	Won	
Astra Film and Creative Awards	8 December 2024	Best Picture	Conclave	Nominated	
Astra Film and Creative Awards	8 December 2024	Best Adapted Screenplay	Peter Straughan	Nominated	
Astra Film and Creative Awards	8 December 2024	Best Actor	Ralph Fiennes	Nominated	
Astra Film and Creative Awards	8 December 2024	Best Cast Ensemble	The cast of Conclave	Nominated	
Astra Film and Creative Awards	8 December 2024	Best Casting	Barbara Giordani, Nina Gold, Francesco Vedovati and Martin Ware	Nominated	
Astra Film and Creative Awards	8 December 2024	Best Film Editing	Nick Emerson	Nominated	
Astra Film and Creative Awards	8 December 2024	Best Production Design	Suzie Davies	Nominated	
Austin Film Critics Association	6 January 2025	Best Film	Conclave	Nominated	
Austin Film Critics Association	6 January 2025	Best Actor	Ralph Fiennes	Nominated	
Austin Film Critics Association	6 January 2025	Best Adapted Screenplay	Peter Straughan	Nominated	
Austin Film Critics Association	6 January 2025	Best Ensemble	Conclave	Nominated	
British Academy Film Awards	16 February 2025	Best Film	Alice Dawson, Robert Harris, Juliette Howell, Michael Jackman, and Tessa Ross	Won	
British Academy Film Awards	16 February 2025	Best Director	Edward Berger	Nominated	
British Academy Film Awards	16 February 2025	Best Actor in a Leading Role	Ralph Fiennes	Nominated	
British Academy Film Awards	16 February 2025	Best Actress in a Supporting Role	Isabella Rossellini	Nominated	
British Academy Film Awards	16 February 2025	Best Adapted Screenplay	Peter Straughan	Won	
British Academy Film Awards	16 February 2025	Best Casting	Nina Gold and Martin Ware	Nominated	
British Academy Film Awards	16 February 2025	Best Original Score	Volker Bertelmann	Nominated	
British Academy Film Awards	16 February 2025	Best Cinematography	Stéphane Fontaine	Nominated	
British Academy Film Awards	16 February 2025	Best Costume Design	Lisy Christl	Nominated	
British Academy Film Awards	16 February 2025	Best Editing	Nick Emerson	Won	
British Academy Film Awards	16 February 2025	Best Production Design	Suzie Davies and Cynthia Sleiter	Nominated	
British Academy Film Awards	16 February 2025	Outstanding British Film	Edward Berger, Tessa Ross, Juliette Howell, Michael A. Jackman, and Peter Straughan	Won	
British Society of Cinematographers	1 February 2025	Best Cinematography in a Feature Film	Stéphane Fontaine	Nominated	
Camerimage	23 November 2024	Golden Frog for Best Cinematography	Stéphane Fontaine	Nominated	
Capri Hollywood International Film Festival	2 January 2025	Best Director	Edward Berger	Won	
Chicago Film Critics Association	12 December 2024	Best Actor	Ralph Fiennes	Nominated	
Chicago Film Critics Association	12 December 2024	Best Adapted Screenplay	Peter Straughan	Nominated	
Costume Designers Guild Awards	6 February 2025	Excellence in Contemporary Film	Lisy Christl	Won	
Critics' Choice Movie Awards	7 February 2025	Best Picture	Conclave	Nominated	
Critics' Choice Movie Awards	7 February 2025	Best Director	Edward Berger	Nominated	
Critics' Choice Movie Awards	7 February 2025	Best Actor	Ralph Fiennes	Nominated	
Critics' Choice Movie Awards	7 February 2025	Best Supporting Actress	Isabella Rossellini	Nominated	
Critics' Choice Movie Awards	7 February 2025	Best Acting Ensemble	Conclave	Won	
Critics' Choice Movie Awards	7 February 2025	Best Adapted Screenplay	Peter Straughan	Won	
Critics' Choice Movie Awards	7 February 2025	Best Score	Volker Bertelmann	Nominated	
Critics' Choice Movie Awards	7 February 2025	Best Cinematography	Stéphane Fontaine	Nominated	
Critics' Choice Movie Awards	7 February 2025	Best Costume Design	Lisy Christl	Nominated	
Critics' Choice Movie Awards	7 February 2025	Best Editing	Nick Emerson	Nominated	
Critics' Choice Movie Awards	7 February 2025	Best Production Design	Suzie Davies	Nominated	
Dallas–Fort Worth Film Critics Association	18 December 2024	Best Picture	Conclave	3rd Place	
Dallas–Fort Worth Film Critics Association	18 December 2024	Best Actor	Ralph Fiennes	Won	
Directors Guild of America Awards	8 February 2025	Outstanding Directing – Feature Film	Edward Berger	Nominated	
European Film Awards	7 December 2024	European Actor	Ralph Fiennes	Nominated	
Florida Film Critics Circle	20 December 2024	Best Picture	Conclave	Nominated	
Florida Film Critics Circle	20 December 2024	Best Actor	Ralph Fiennes	Nominated	
Florida Film Critics Circle	20 December 2024	Best Supporting Actress	Isabella Rossellini	Nominated	
Florida Film Critics Circle	20 December 2024	Best Adapted Screenplay	Peter Straughan	Nominated	
Florida Film Critics Circle	20 December 2024	Best Cinematography	Stéphane Fontaine	Nominated	
Florida Film Critics Circle	20 December 2024	Best Original Score	Volker Bertelmann	Nominated	
Florida Film Critics Circle	20 December 2024	Best Ensemble	Conclave	Won	
Florida Film Critics Circle	20 December 2024	Best Art Direction / Production Design	Conclave	Nominated	
Golden Globe Awards	5 January 2025	Best Motion Picture – Drama	Conclave	Nominated	
Golden Globe Awards	5 January 2025	Best Actor in a Motion Picture – Drama	Ralph Fiennes	Nominated	
Golden Globe Awards	5 January 2025	Best Supporting Actress – Motion Picture	Isabella Rossellini	Nominated	
Golden Globe Awards	5 January 2025	Best Director	Edward Berger	Nominated	
Golden Globe Awards	5 January 2025	Best Screenplay	Peter Straughan	Won	
Golden Globe Awards	5 January 2025	Best Original Score	Volker Bertelmann	Nominated	
Golden Trailer Awards	29 May 2025	Best Drama TV Spot (for a Feature Film)	Universal Pictures / Inside Job (for "Power")	Nominated	
Goya Awards	28 February 2026	Best European Film	Conclave	Nominated	
Hollywood Music in Media Awards	20 November 2024	Best Original Score – Feature Film	Volker Bertelmann	Nominated	
Imagen Awards	22 August 2025	Best Feature Film	Conclave	Nominated	
Imagen Awards	22 August 2025	Best Supporting Actor	Carlos Diehz	Nominated	
London Film Critics' Circle Awards	2 February 2025	Film of the Year	Conclave	Nominated	
London Film Critics' Circle Awards	2 February 2025	British or Irish Film of the Year	Conclave	Won	
London Film Critics' Circle Awards	2 February 2025	Screenwriter of the Year	Peter Straughan	Nominated	
London Film Critics' Circle Awards	2 February 2025	Actor of the Year	Ralph Fiennes	Won	
London Film Critics' Circle Awards	2 February 2025	Supporting Actress of the Year	Isabella Rossellini	Nominated	
London Film Critics' Circle Awards	2 February 2025	Technical Achievement Award	Nick Emerson	Nominated	
Mill Valley Film Festival	16 October 2024	Audience Overall Favorite	Conclave	Won	
National Board of Review	4 December 2024	Top 10 Films	Conclave	Won (Note: This award does not have a single winner, but recognizes multiple films.)	
National Board of Review	4 December 2024	Best Ensemble	Conclave	Won	
New York Film Critics Online	16 December 2024	Best Picture	Conclave	Nominated	
New York Film Critics Online	16 December 2024	Best Director	Edward Berger	Nominated	
New York Film Critics Online	16 December 2024	Best Actor	Ralph Fiennes	Runner-up	
New York Film Critics Online	16 December 2024	Best Screenplay	Peter Straughan	Nominated	
New York Film Critics Online	16 December 2024	Best Cinematography	Stéphane Fontaine	Runner-up	
New York Film Critics Online	16 December 2024	Best Ensemble	Conclave	Won	
Online Film Critics Society	27 January 2025	Best Picture	Conclave	Nominated	
Online Film Critics Society	27 January 2025	Best Actor	Ralph Fiennes	Won	
Online Film Critics Society	27 January 2025	Best Supporting Actress	Isabella Rossellini	Nominated	
Online Film Critics Society	27 January 2025	Best Adapted Screenplay	Peter Straughan	Won	
Online Film Critics Society	27 January 2025	Best Cinematography	Stéphane Fontaine	Nominated	
Online Film Critics Society	27 January 2025	Best Costume Design	Lisy Christl	Nominated	
Online Film Critics Society	27 January 2025	Best Original Score	Volker Bertelmann	Nominated	
Palm Springs International Film Festival	3 January 2025	Ensemble Performance Award	Ralph Fiennes, Stanley Tucci, John Lithgow, Lucian Msamati and Isabella Rossellini	Honored	
Polish Film Awards	10 March 2025	Best European Film	Edward Berger	Nominated	
San Diego Film Critics Society	9 December 2024	Best Picture	Conclave	Runner-up	
San Diego Film Critics Society	9 December 2024	Best Director	Edward Berger	Nominated	
San Diego Film Critics Society	9 December 2024	Best Actor	Ralph Fiennes	Nominated	
San Diego Film Critics Society	9 December 2024	Best Supporting Actor	Stanley Tucci	Nominated	
San Diego Film Critics Society	9 December 2024	Best Adapted Screenplay	Peter Straughan	Nominated	
San Diego Film Critics Society	9 December 2024	Best Ensemble	Conclave	Runner-up	
San Diego Film Critics Society	9 December 2024	Best Cinematography	Stéphane Fontaine	Runner-up	
San Diego Film Critics Society	9 December 2024	Best Costume Design	Lisy Christl	Nominated	
San Diego Film Critics Society	9 December 2024	Best Production Design	Suzie Davies	Nominated	
San Diego International Film Festival	20 October 2024	Best Gala Film	Conclave	Won	
San Francisco Bay Area Film Critics Circle	15 December 2024	Best Actor	Ralph Fiennes	Nominated	
San Francisco Bay Area Film Critics Circle	15 December 2024	Best Supporting Actress	Isabella Rossellini	Nominated	
San Francisco Bay Area Film Critics Circle	15 December 2024	Best Adapted Screenplay	Peter Straughan	Nominated	
San Francisco Bay Area Film Critics Circle	15 December 2024	Best Cinematography	Stéphane Fontaine	Nominated	
San Francisco Bay Area Film Critics Circle	15 December 2024	Best Editing	Nick Emerson	Nominated	
San Francisco Bay Area Film Critics Circle	15 December 2024	Best Original Score	Volker Bertelmann	Nominated	
San Francisco Bay Area Film Critics Circle	15 December 2024	Best Production Design	Suzie Davies and Roberta Federico	Nominated	
San Sebastián International Film Festival	28 September 2024	Golden Shell	Conclave	Nominated	
Santa Barbara International Film Festival	15 February 2025	Outstanding Performer of the Year Award	Ralph Fiennes	Honored	
Satellite Awards	26 January 2025	Best Motion Picture – Drama	Conclave	Nominated	
Satellite Awards	26 January 2025	Best Director	Edward Berger	Nominated	
Satellite Awards	26 January 2025	Best Actor in a Motion Picture – Drama	Ralph Fiennes	Nominated	
Satellite Awards	26 January 2025	Best Supporting Actress	Isabella Rossellini	Nominated	
Satellite Awards	26 January 2025	Best Adapted Screenplay	Peter Straughan	Nominated	
Satellite Awards	26 January 2025	Best Film Editing	Nick Emerson	Nominated	
Satellite Awards	26 January 2025	Best Production Design	Suzie Davies and Cynthia Sleiter	Nominated	
Satellite Awards	26 January 2025	Best Original Score	Volker Bertelmann	Nominated	
Screen Actors Guild Awards	23 February 2025	Outstanding Performance by a Male Actor in a Leading Role	Ralph Fiennes	Nominated	
Screen Actors Guild Awards	23 February 2025	Outstanding Performance by a Cast in a Motion Picture	Sergio Castellitto, Ralph Fiennes, John Lithgow, Lucian Msamati, Isabella Rossellini, and Stanley Tucci	Won	
Seattle Film Critics Society	16 December 2024	Best Picture	Conclave	Nominated	
Seattle Film Critics Society	16 December 2024	Best Lead Actor	Ralph Fiennes	Nominated	
Seattle Film Critics Society	16 December 2024	Best Supporting Actress	Isabella Rossellini	Nominated	
Seattle Film Critics Society	16 December 2024	Best Screenplay	Peter Straughan	Nominated	
Seattle Film Critics Society	16 December 2024	Best Ensemble	Conclave	Nominated	
Seattle Film Critics Society	16 December 2024	Best Costume Design	Lisy Christl	Nominated	
Seattle Film Critics Society	16 December 2024	Best Original Score	Volker Bertelmann	Nominated	
Seattle Film Critics Society	16 December 2024	Best Production Design	Suzie Davies and Cynthia Sleiter	Nominated	
Set Decorators Society of America	7 February 2025	Best Achievement in Décor/Design of a Contemporary Feature Film	Cynthia Sleiter, Suzie Davies	Won	
Society of Composers & Lyricists	12 February 2025	Outstanding Original Score for a Studio Film	Volker Bertelmann	Nominated	
St. Louis Film Critics Association	15 December 2024	Best Film	Conclave	Nominated	
St. Louis Film Critics Association	15 December 2024	Best Director	Edward Berger	Nominated	
St. Louis Film Critics Association	15 December 2024	Best Actor	Ralph Fiennes	Nominated	
St. Louis Film Critics Association	15 December 2024	Best Supporting Actor	Stanley Tucci	Nominated	
St. Louis Film Critics Association	15 December 2024	Best Adapted Screenplay	Peter Straughan	Won	
St. Louis Film Critics Association	15 December 2024	Best Ensemble	Conclave	Won	
St. Louis Film Critics Association	15 December 2024	Best Score	Volker Bertelmann	Nominated	
St. Louis Film Critics Association	15 December 2024	Best Production Design	Suzie Davies and Cynthia Sleiter	Nominated	
Toronto Film Critics Association	15 December 2024	Best Lead Performance	Ralph Fiennes	Runner-up	
Toronto Film Critics Association	15 December 2024	Best Adapted Screenplay	Peter Straughan	Runner-up	
USC Scripter Awards	22 February 2025	Best Adapted Screenplay	Peter Straughan	Won	
Washington D.C. Area Film Critics Association	8 December 2024	Best Film	Conclave	Nominated	
Washington D.C. Area Film Critics Association	8 December 2024	Best Director	Edward Berger	Nominated	
Washington D.C. Area Film Critics Association	8 December 2024	Best Actor	Ralph Fiennes	Nominated	
Washington D.C. Area Film Critics Association	8 December 2024	Best Supporting Actress	Isabella Rossellini	Nominated	
Washington D.C. Area Film Critics Association	8 December 2024	Best Adapted Screenplay	Peter Straughan	Won	
Washington D.C. Area Film Critics Association	8 December 2024	Best Cinematography	Stéphane Fontaine	Nominated	
Washington D.C. Area Film Critics Association	8 December 2024	Best Editing	Nick Emerson	Nominated	
Washington D.C. Area Film Critics Association	8 December 2024	Best Original Score	Volker Bertelmann	Nominated	
Washington D.C. Area Film Critics Association	8 December 2024	Best Acting Ensemble	Conclave	Won	

== Impact and real-life parallels ==
=== Social media influence ===
Following the film's release, several outlets noted the film's presence on social media and within meme culture. Memes comparing the film to RuPaul's Drag Race and The Real Housewives appeared on Twitter, while other users created fan cams, including ones set to pop musicians such as Charli XCX. Online comparisons were also made to media such as Mean Girls, while the "elimination" of the various papal candidates was compared to reality television shows like Survivor or The Bachelor. Also noted were memes comparing the characters in the film to real life figures such as Donald Trump and Kamala Harris, the two major candidates in the 2024 United States presidential election, which took place days after the film's U.S. release. Many of these outlets took note of the apparent contradiction that a film that "might be [for] retired folks catching a weekday matinee" was popular in meme culture.

The Twitter fan account, Pope Crave, a parody of Pop Crave, was created in December of 2024. The account posts memes about the film and gained significant attention following the 2025 conclave.

=== Real-life parallels ===
On 14 February 2025, Pope Francis, who was 88 years old at the time, became very ill and was hospitalized, suffering from multiple chronic respiratory conditions. Philiana Ng of TheWrap observed that the cast of Conclave celebrated their ensemble win at the Screen Actors Guild Awards, but acknowledged the real-life parallels of the film – chronicling the aftermath of the death of a fictitious pope – amid Pope Francis's then-current health crisis. Ng quoted Isabella Rossellini: "We are very, very worried for our pope, ... [W]e love this pope – Papa Francesco, Pope Francis. We wish him well. We wish him to recover."

The death of Pope Francis on 21 April 2025, resulted in an actual two-day conclave being called from 7 May 2025. According to Luminate, Francis's death resulted in a near three-fold increase in home viewership of the film via streaming platforms on 21 April. According to Politico Europe, several cardinals watched the film to understand the process for the papal election. According to his brother John, among the cardinals who watched the film to educate themselves about the process was Cardinal Robert Prevost ('Bob' Prevost) from Chicago, who would be subsequently elected as Pope Leo XIV.

== See also ==
- Intersex people and religion
