= Nick Emerson =

Northern Irish film editor

- Born: Belfast, Northern Ireland
- Occupation: Film editor
- Years active: 2000–present

Nick Emerson is a Northern Irish film editor. He was nominated for an Academy Award in the category Best Film Editing for the film Conclave.

== Early life ==
Emerson was born in Belfast.

== Career ==
Emerson has worked in film editing since 2000. He won an IFTA in 2017 for I Am Not a Serial Killer. He also edited Lady Macbeth, Film Stars Don't Die in Liverpool and the 2020 version of Emma.

He was nominated for the Academy Award for Best Film Editing for his work on the 2024 film Conclave.

According to filmmaker Rob Feld, "Emerson’s path to becoming a sought-after editor is marked by versatility and a passion for storytelling. […] His ability to adapt across genres, from intimate dramas to thrilling features, has made him a trusted collaborator for directors seeking a thoughtful and disciplined approach to editing."

== Awards and nominations ==
Award	Date of ceremony	Category	Work	Result	Ref.
Santa Barbara International Film Festival	February 8, 2025	Variety Artisans Award – Editing	Conclave	Won	
Academy Awards	March 2, 2025	Film Editing	Conclave	Nominated	
British Academy Film Awards	February 16, 2025	BAFTA Award for Best Editing	Conclave	Won	
