= Rhys Salcombe =

Welsh-Canadian visual effects artist

- Occupation: Visual effects artist

Rhys Salcombe is a Welsh-Canadian visual effects artist. He won an Academy Award in the category Best Visual Effects for the film Dune: Part Two.

At the 78th British Academy Film Awards, he won a BAFTA Award for Best Special Visual Effects. His win was shared with Paul Lambert, Stephen James and Gerd Nefzer.

== Selected filmography ==
- Dune: Part Two (2024)
