= Pope Crave =

Christian parody Twitter account

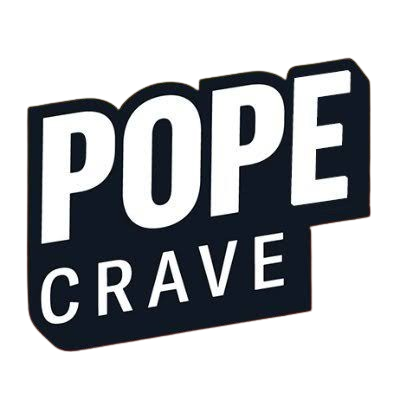
- Formation: December 2024; 1 year ago
- Type: Satire news account
- Official language: English
- Owner: Susan Bin
- Website: popecrave.com

Twitter information
- Handle: @ClubConcrave
- Followers: 105 thousand (February 2026)

Pope Crave (@ClubConcrave) is a Twitter fan account for the 2024 film Conclave. The account attracted widespread attention following the death of Pope Francis and the subsequent conclave, which it covered at length.

== History ==
Susan Bin, a fan of Conclave, created a fan account for the film in December 2024. Conclave is a 2024 political thriller film about a fictional conclave, the selection of a new pope of the Catholic Church. Since its founding, the account has posted memes about the film. The account's name—with the display name Pope Crave and the username @ClubConcrave—is inspired by Pop Crave, a celebrity news account and ClubChalamet, a Timothée Chalamet fan account.

In February 2025, the account created a charity Conclave fanzine to fundraise for the Intersex Human Rights Fund, the Freedom Fund, and Librarians & Archivists With Palestine.

Pope Francis died on April 21, 2025; Pope Crave received many direct messages about his death. There were memes about the real-life conclave following Francis' death; the rise in memes was partially attributed to Pope Crave. The account received attention for its coverage of the 2025 conclave, with administrators posting updates from Vatican City throughout the process. The Tab reported that Pope Crave was considered the go-to account for news about the conclave.

When Pope Leo XIV was confirmed to be the next pope, the account expressed concern over his previous comments on LGBTQ affairs. One of the administrators of the account wrote: "Our new Pope has spoken against 'Western' leniency towards LGBTQ+ individuals and against 'gender ideology' in Peru. As a lesbian Catholic, I am disappointed."

On April 3, 2026, Pope Crave was among the first report on the Conclave airing as part of special Holy Week programming on Kapamilya Channel, ABS-CBN on AllTV2 and A2Z with simultaneous livestream on iWant and Kapamilya Online Live.
