= Moderate Christianity =

Christian movement based on spiritual wisdom

Moderate Christianity is a theological movement in Christianity that seeks to make decisions based on spiritual wisdom.

== Origin ==
Moderation in Christianity is related to the spiritual wisdom that is addressed in Epistle of James in chapter 3 verse 17. In the First Epistle to Timothy, moderation is also referred to as temperance and is a required characteristic to be bishop in the Church.

== Characteristics ==
Moderate Christianity is characterized by its concern to bring hope to the world, to include cultural diversity and creative collaboration, by not being fundamentalist or liberal, by being predominantly conservative even while being guardedly open to newer developments and trends; by being committed to judicious discernment and avoiding extremism in its decisions.

== Catholicism ==
Moderate Catholic Christianity mainly became visible in the 18th century, with Catholic groups taking more moderate positions, such as supporting ecumenism and liturgical reforms. These moderates are also overwhelmingly in favor of state autonomy and the independence of Church doctrine from the state. After Vatican Council II, moderate Catholics distanced themselves from traditionalist Catholicism.

== Evangelicalism ==
Moderate evangelical Christianity emerged in the 1940s in the United States in response to the fundamentalist movement of the 1910s. In the late 1940s, evangelical theologians from Fuller Theological Seminary founded in Pasadena, California, in 1947, championed the Christian importance of social activism. The study of the Bible has been accompanied by certain disciplines such as Biblical hermeneutics, Biblical exegesis and apologetics. Moderate theologians have become more present in Bible colleges and more moderate theological positions have been adopted in evangelical churches. In this movement called neo-evangelicalism, new organizations, social agencies, media and Bible colleges were established in the 1950s.

== See also ==
- Christian fundamentalism
- Conservative Christianity
- Liberal Christianity
- Progressive Christianity
- Political moderate
