= Stephen James (visual effects artist) =

Canadian visual effects artist

- Occupation: Visual effects artist
- Years active: 2005–present

Stephen James is a Canadian visual effects artist. He won an Academy Award in the category Best Visual Effects for the film Dune: Part Two.

In addition to his Academy Award nomination, he won a Primetime Emmy Award in the category Outstanding Special Visual Effects for his work on the television program The Last of Us. He also won a BAFTA Award for Best Special Visual Effects. His win was shared with Paul Lambert, Gerd Nefzer and Rhys Salcombe.

== Selected filmography ==
- Dune: Part Two (2024)
