= Lisy Christl =

German costume designer (born 1964)

- Born: 1964 (age 61–62)
- Occupation: Costume designer
- Years active: 1995–present

Lisy Christl (born 1964 in Munich) is a German costume designer.

Christl started working as a costume designer in movies in 1995. She has worked with directors Michael Haneke, Edward Berger, Roland Emmerich, Terrence Mallick, Christian Petzold, Hans-Christian Schmid and Florian Gallenberger among others.

== Career ==
In 2009, she received a German Film Award for the costumes in Gallenberger's film John Rabe.

On January 24, 2012, she was nominated for an Academy Award for her Elizabethan costumes in Roland Emmerich's movie Anonymous.

On January 23, 2025, she was nominated for an Academy Award for her costume design in Edward Berger's movie Conclave.

== Filmography ==
Film (all roles are "costume designer" unless otherwise stated)
Year	Title	Director	Notes
1995	Brother of Sleep	Joseph Vilsmaier	assistant costume designer
1997	Funny Games	Michael Haneke	
2000	Marlene	Joseph Vilsmaier	
2003	Wolfsburg	Christian Petzold	
2003	Time of the Wolf	Michael Haneke	
2004	Peas at 5:30	Lars Büchel	
2004	Shadows of Time	Florian Gallenberger	
2005	Caché	Michael Haneke	
2009	John Rabe	Florian Gallenberger	
2009	Lila, Lila	Alain Gsponer	
2010	Boxhagener Platz	Matti Geschonneck	
2011	Anonymous	Roland Emmerich	
2012	Home for the Weekend	Hans-Christian Schmid	
2013	White House Down	Roland Emmerich	
2015	Point Break	Ericson Core	
2016	Independence Day: Resurgence	Roland Emmerich	
2018	Balloon	Michael Herbig	
2019	A Hidden Life	Terrence Malick	
2021	Next Door	Daniel Brühl	
2022	All Quiet on the Western Front	Edward Berger	
2024	Conclave	Edward Berger	
2025	The Ballad of a Small Player	Edward Berger	

== See also ==
- List of German-speaking Academy Award winners and nominees
