= Michael Jackman (producer) =

Film and Television Producer

Michael Jackman, also known as Michael A. Jackman and Mike Jackman, is an American film and television producer. He has produced films such as The Good Nurse (2022), Greyhound (2020), Arrival (2016), Eternal Sunshine of the Spotless Mind (2004), and more. Throughout his career, he has worked with directors such as Martin Scorsese and Denis Villeneuve. He recently served as producer on the 2024 psychological thriller film Conclave, based on the 2016 novel by Robert Harris and directed by Edward Berger.

== Early life and education ==
Jackman graduated from the University of Pennsylvania with a Bachelor of Arts degree in Psychology in 1985.

== Career ==
=== Early career ===
Jackman worked in partnership with Jason Alexander on projects such as the Agent Cody Banks films for Twentieth Century Fox and MGM. Jackman also oversaw the development of the post-production facility Deluxe Entertainment in New York City, and served as Senior Vice President of post-production at The Weinstein Company.

=== FilmNation Entertainment ===
Michael recently served as Executive Vice President of Physical Production and Post at FilmNation Entertainment. Notable credits during Jackman's tenure include science fiction drama film Arrival, American war film Greyhound, and American thriller film The Good Nurse.

Jackman's most recent project with FilmNation Entertainment was as producer of the film Conclave, which is directed by Edward Berger and theatrically released in the United States by Focus Features on October 25, 2024. Before its U.S. theatrical release, the film had its world premiere at the 51st Telluride Film Festival. The film was shown at additional film festivals, having its international premiere at the Toronto International Film Festival and its West Coast premiere at the 47th Mill Valley Film Festival.

=== Upcoming projects ===
In October 2024, it was announced Jackman would serve as executive producer of Boots Riley's upcoming film I Love Boosters, starring Keke Palmer, Demi Moore, and LaKeith Stanfield. Principal photography began on November 7, 2024, in Atlanta.

== Other ==
Jackman also serves on the Board of Directors of the New York Production Alliance.

== Filmography ==
=== Film ===
==== Executive producer ====
- Agent Cody Banks (2003)
- Agent Cody Banks 2: Destination London (2004)
- Breakfast with Curtis (2012)
- Glider (2018)
- Greyhound (2020)
- To Catch A Killer (2023)

==== Producer ====
- On Edge (2001)
- A Teen's Guide to Understanding and Communicating with People with Autism (2013)
- The Good Nurse (2022)
- Conclave (2024)

==== Co-producer ====
- Just Looking (1999)
- Stay Until Tomorrow (2004)
- Arrival (2016)
- Kill Switch (2017)
- Life Itself (2018)
- The Lodge (2019)

==== Associate producer ====
- Letters from a Killer (1998)
- Eternal Sunshine of the Spotless Mind (2004)

==== Line producer ====
- Sex and the Other Man (1995)
- Way Past Cool (2000)
- Gangs of New York (2002)

=== Television ===
==== Executive producer ====
- Tony V: Wait Til You Hear This (2024)
- Dan Naturman: A Little Bit Bananas (2024)
- Gregg Rogell: Balloon Animals (2024)
- Cory Kahaney: From Happy Hour to Last Call (2024)
- Tommy Tiernan: Tomfoolery (2024)

==== Co-producer ====
- Bob Patterson (2001)

== Awards and nominations ==
Academy Awards

- 2025: Best Picture (for Conclave, nominated)

BAFTA Awards

- 2025: Best Film (for Conclave, won)
- 2025: Outstanding British Film (for Conclave, won)

Critics Choice Awards

- 2025: Best Picture (for Conclave, nominated)

Golden Globe Awards

- 2025: Best Motion Picture - Drama (for Conclave, nominated)

PGA Awards

- 2025: Outstanding Producer of Theatrical Motion Pictures (for Conclave, nominated)

American Film Institute

- 2024: AFI Top 10 Movies of the Year (for Conclave, honoree)
