= Jeff Hermann =

American film producer

- Occupation: Film producer

Jeff Hermann is an American film producer. He was nominated for two British Academy Film Awards in the categories Best Animated Film and Best Children's and Family Film for the film The Wild Robot.

At the 97th Academy Awards, he was nominated for an Academy Award in the category Best Animated Feature. His nomination was shared with Chris Sanders.

== Selected filmography ==
- Bird Karma (2018)
- The Boss Baby: Family Business (2021)
- The Wild Robot (2024)
