= Tessa Ross =

English film producer

- Born: Tessa Sarah Ross; 1961 (age 64–65); London, England
- Education: Somerville College, Oxford
- Occupations: Film producer; Executive
- Years active: 1986–present

Tessa Sarah Ross CBE (born 1961) is an English film producer and executive. She received the BAFTA Award for Outstanding British Contribution to Cinema Award and was named one of the 100 most powerful women in the United Kingdom by Woman's Hour in 2013. She is an honorary fellow of the National Film and Television School. In the 2010 New Year Honours, she was appointed a CBE for services to broadcasting.

Ross was designated Head of Film at Channel 4 in 2000 and ran Film4 and Film4 Productions from 2002 to 2014. In 2011, she was appointed to the Board of the Royal National Theatre, and became Chief executive in 2014. She resigned in April 2015, citing concerns over the new leadership structure, but remained working with the National Theatre as a consultant.

Ross has been the executive producer of a number of notable British films, including Billy Elliot (2000), The Last King of Scotland (2006), This Is England (2006), Happy-Go-Lucky (2008), Slumdog Millionaire (2008), Hunger (2008), Four Lions (2010), 127 Hours (2010), Shame (2011), 12 Years a Slave (2013), Under the Skin (2013), Ex Machina (2015), 45 Years (2015), Room (2015), and Carol (2015). For her work producing Conclave (2024), she was nominated for the Academy Award for Best Picture & won the BAFTA Award for Best Film.

== Early life ==
Ross was born to a Jewish family in 1961 in London. The daughter of a lawyer and teacher, she attended Westminster School, and graduated from Somerville College, Oxford in 1980. Ross read oriental studies and Chinese at Oxford and became interested in theatre. She was president of the dramatic society and directed many plays, later getting postgraduate theatre training. She is now an Honorary Fellow of Somerville College.

== Career ==
After graduating from Oxford, Ross became a literary agent in 1986. She then segued into television, commissioning work for Bill Bryden, who had worked at the Royal National Theatre and was the head of the BBC Scotland drama department. She also worked as a script editor. Ross was married at the time and left when she became pregnant. She then returned to London, and in 1990 ran the National Film Development Fund, which later became British Screen.

In 1993, Ross worked again at BBC. She ran the Independent Commissioning Group for Drama from 1993 to 2000, commissioning many film and television projects, including Billy Elliot and Clocking Off. In 2000, she worked at Channel 4, where she became Head of Drama and was later appointed Head of Film. Ross ran Film4 and Film4 Productions from 2002 to 2014. She was appointed as a Governor of the British Film Institute in 2010. The following year, she was appointed to the Board of the Royal National Theatre, and became Chief executive in 2014. She resigned in April 2015, citing concerns over the new leadership structure, but remained working with the National Theatre as a consultant.

Ross is an Honorary Associate of London Film School.

== Personal life ==
Ross resides in Camden, London. She is married to a marketing consultant, and has three children.

== Filmography ==
Films Ross has executive produced.

- Billy Elliot (2000)
- Liam (2000)
- Touching the Void (2003)
- Dead Man's Shoes (2004)
- Enduring Love (2004)
- The Motorcycle Diaries (2004)
- Brothers of the Head (2005)
- Isolation (2005)
- Mischief Night (2006)
- This Is England (2006)
- The Last King of Scotland (2006)
- The Road to Guantánamo (2006)
- Venus (2006)
- And When Did You Last See Your Father? (2007)
- Brick Lane (2007)
- Far North (2007)
- Garage (2007)
- A Summer in Genoa (2008)
- Happy-Go-Lucky (2008)
- How to Lose Friends & Alienate People (2008)
- Incendiary (2008)
- In Bruges (2008)
- Slumdog Millionaire (2008)
- Hunger (2008
- Nowhere Boy (2009)
- The Lovely Bones (2009)
- Another Year (2010)
- Four Lions (2010)
- Never Let Me Go (2010)
- Submarine (2010)
- 127 Hours (2010)
- Attack the Block (2011)
- The Eagle (2011)
- The Iron Lady (2011)
- One Day (2011)
- On the Road (2011)
- Shame (2011)
- The Woman in the Fifth (2011)
- Wuthering Heights (2011)
- Hyde Park on Hudson (2012)
- Seven Psychopaths (2012)
- The Double (2013)
- How I Live Now (2013)
- The Look of Love (2013)
- Trance (2013)
- Under the Skin (2013)
- 12 Years a Slave (2013)
- Frank (2014)
- A Most Wanted Man (2014)
- '71 (2014)
- Cuban Fury (2014)
- The Riot Club (2014)
- Black Sea (2014)
- Ex Machina (2015)
- 45 Years (2015)
- Life (2015)
- The Lobster (2015)
- Carol (2015)
- Macbeth (2015)
- Suffragette (2015)
- Room (2015)
- Ink (2026)
- Sweetsick (TBA)

She has also served as co-producer on the following films:

- Conclave (2024)

== Awards ==
- 2026: Lifetime Achievement Award at 21st Rome Film Festival.
