= Conclave (novel) =

2016 novel by Robert Harris

- Author: Robert Harris
- Language: English
- Publication date: 2016
- Publication place: United Kingdom

Conclave is a 2016 novel by British writer Robert Harris. The book is set in the context of the death of a pope and the subsequent papal conclave to elect his successor.

A film based on the book was theatrically released in the United States in 2024.

== Plot ==
Jacopo Lomeli is summoned to the Casa Santa Marta, where the pope has died in his sleep of a heart attack. As Dean of the College of Cardinals, the responsibility for overseeing the next papal conclave will be his.

Four cardinals emerge as the leading candidates: Aldo Bellini, the late pope's Secretary of State and the candidate supported by the Church's liberal wing; Joseph Tremblay, Camerlengo and Archbishop Emeritus of Quebec; Joshua Adeyemi of Nigeria, with the prospect of becoming the first black Pope; and Goffredo Tedesco, the reactionary Patriarch of Venice. Shortly before the cardinals are sequestered for the duration of the conclave, Archbishop Woźniak, Prefect of the Papal Household, tells Lomeli that the late pope had demanded Tremblay's resignation shortly before but without explanation. Lomeli is taken aback, as there was no official record and he cannot obtain corroboration. An added complication is the last minute appearance of Vincent Benítez, a Filipino and the Archbishop of Baghdad, whom the late pope had created cardinal in pectore.

During the Mass preceding the conclave's first ballot, Lomeli is inspired to give an off-the-cuff homily and is frustrated when some misinterpret it as his making a play for the papacy himself. In the first ballot, no one gains the necessary two-thirds majority (79 of 118 votes), but Tedesco, Adeyemi, Bellini and Tremblay are confirmed as the main contenders. Over the next two ballots, Adeyemi builds momentum, while Bellini's prospects evaporate.

At lunch there is a commotion involving Adeyemi and a Nigerian nun, Sister Shanumi. Lomeli invites her confession and learns that, thirty years previously, the two had an illicit relationship that produced a child. Lomeli is bound not to divulge details of the confession, but the incident ignites speculation of a possible scandal and the Dean lets it be known to Adeyemi's supporters that he will have to resign his offices after the conclave.

The main contenders are reduced to two by the fifth ballot. Bellini reluctantly decides to support Tremblay to keep Tedesco from becoming pope. When Lomeli investigates Sister Shanumi's sudden transfer to Rome from Nigeria, he discovers the request originated from Tremblay. He accuses Tremblay of scheming to blackmail Adeyemi and demands he withdraw his candidacy, but Tremblay claims that he made the request on the late pope's behalf.

After nightfall, Lomeli breaks the seals on the late pope's quarters in search of evidence and discovers hidden compartments in the bed frame containing the financial records of the entire Curia, as well as an analysis of Tremblay's activities as Prefect of the Congregation for the Evangelization of Peoples that indicates he committed simony by giving cash payments to several cardinals over the past year.

At breakfast on the third day of the conclave, Lomeli distributes copies of the Tremblay report. This kills his candidacy and upends the conclave again. In the sixth ballot, Tedesco leads, with Lomeli a close second and Benítez a distant third. As voting on the seventh ballot commences, a car bomb beyond the walls rocks the Sistine Chapel, but since no one is injured and only windows are shattered, the process continues. Lomeli is catapulted to front-runner status, trailed by Tedesco and Benítez.

As the cardinals break for lunch, the Dean is informed that the explosion was part of a series of Islamic terrorist attacks across Europe against Catholic institutions. In light of this news and dueling speeches by Tedesco and Benítez, the former exhorting retaliation and the latter arguing against meeting violence with violence, the cardinals agree to skip their meal and proceed immediately to the eighth ballot in which Vincent Benítez is elected pope with 92 votes, fulfilling the two-thirds majority requirement. Benítez consents to the honour and chooses the name Innocent XIV.

Just before the result is publicly announced, O'Malley brings to Lomeli's attention that Benítez had booked and later abandoned an appointment at a gender reassignment clinic earlier that year. The new pope tells Lomeli privately that he was born intersex and raised as a male by his parents. It was only after he was injured in a bombing in Iraq and was medically examined that he was informed of his condition. Benítez had tried to resign from his office as a consequence, but the late pope refused it. Lomeli resolves to keep it secret too, trusting that God's will guided the conclave's outcome.

== Composition ==
Harris says that he was inspired to write a novel about papal politics while watching coverage of the 2013 papal conclave. At that time, he was working on his Cicero Trilogy, a series of novels set during the Roman Republic, and the papal electors reminded him of the Roman Senate. He consulted Cardinal Cormac Murphy-O'Connor as part of his research for the book. He later gave Murphy-O'Connor a copy of the novel, and to his surprise, Murphy-O'Connor sent a letter praising its accuracy. When asked about the novel's final twist in a 2025 interview following the release of its film adaptation, Harris stated that he had expected it to be controversial but felt it would be worthwhile. He told himself that "this is what novels should do: jolt the reader, cause a commotion, make people think — even if they hate it."

== See also ==
- Politics of Vatican City
- Catholic social teaching
- Pope Joan
- Pope John Paul II
- Pope Francis
