= List of accolades received by The Substance =

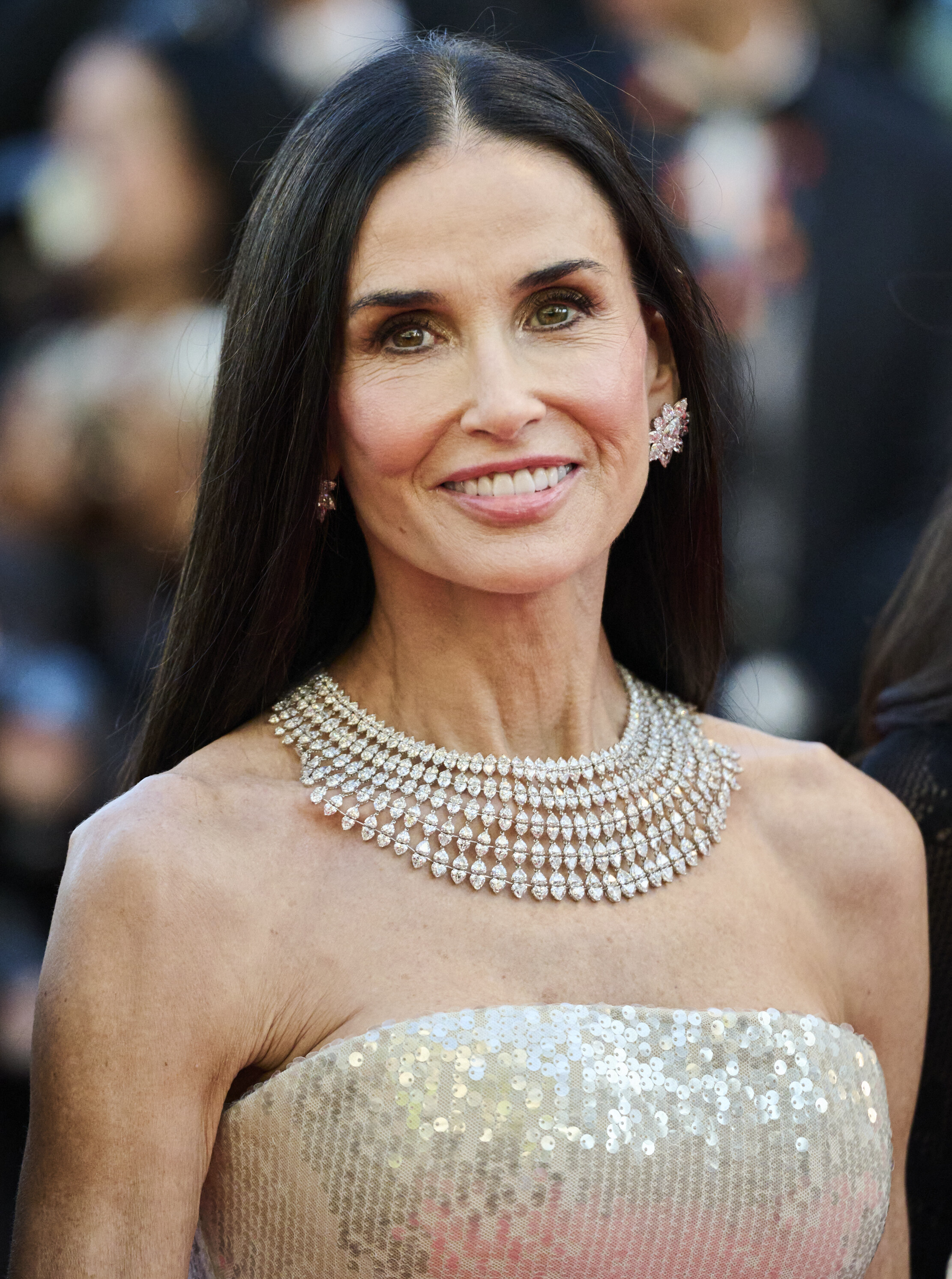
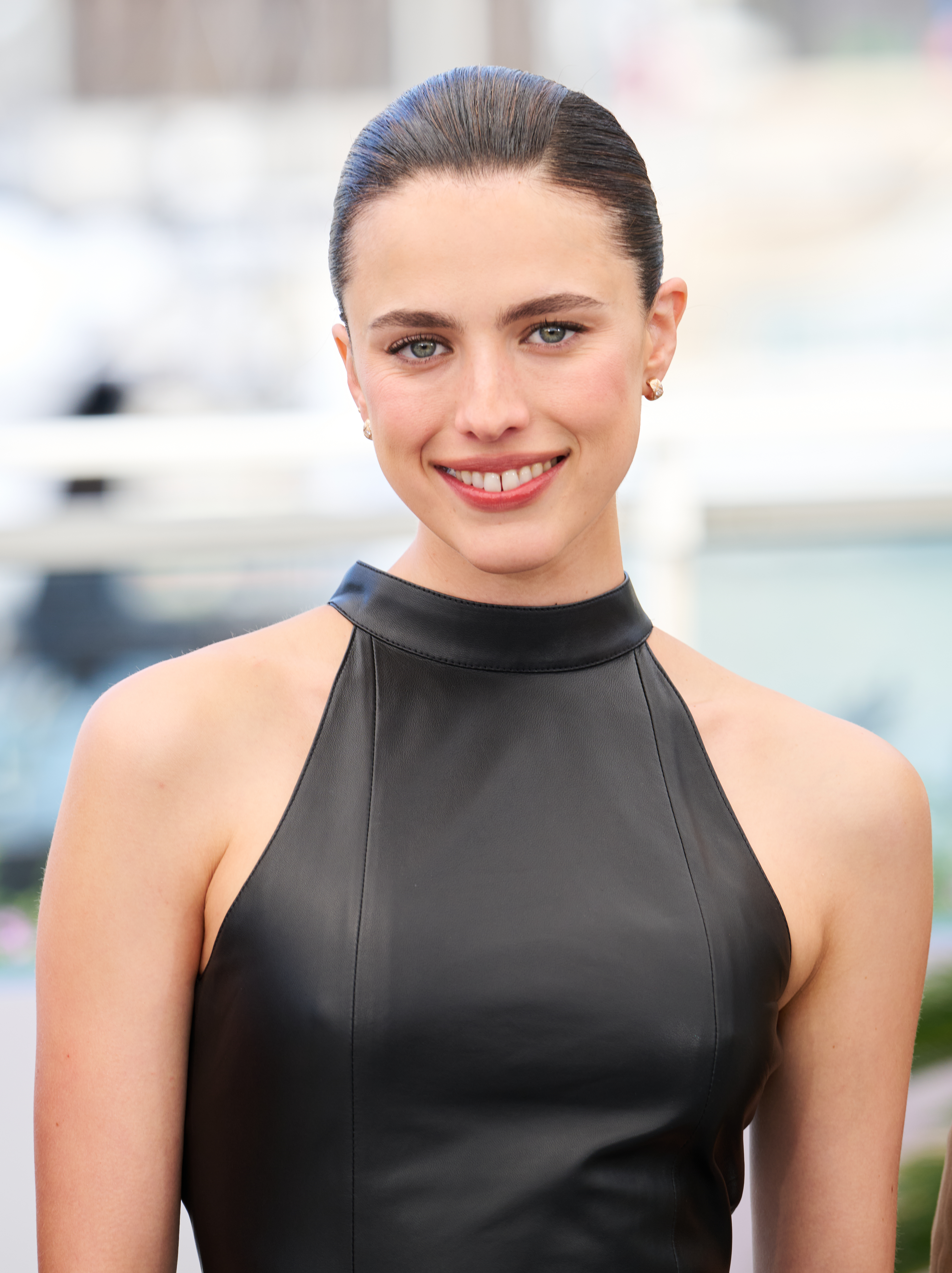
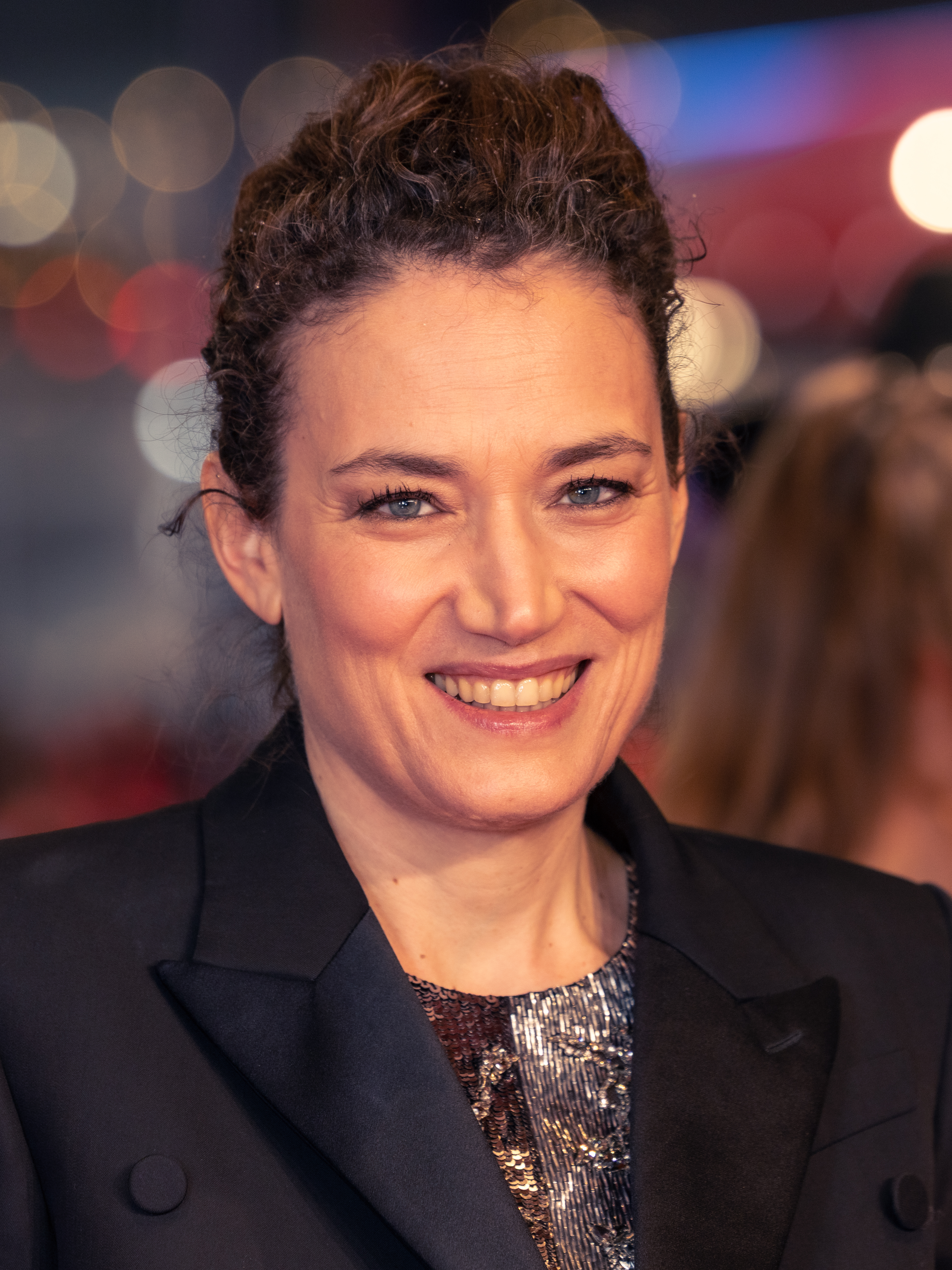
- Demi Moore (left) and Margaret Qualley (center) received multiple accolades for their performances, while Coralie Fargeat (right) received various accolades for her screenplay and direction.
Accolades
Award	Wins	Nominations
AARP Movies for Grownups Awards	1	1
Academy Awards	1	5
Alliance of Women Film Journalists	4	8
American Cinema Editors Awards	0	1
Art Directors Guild Awards	0	1
Astra Film and Creative Arts Awards	1	10
Austin Film Critics Association	3	7
Bodil Awards	0	1
British Academy Film Awards	1	5
Cannes Film Festival	1	2
César Awards	0	1
Chicago Film Critics Association	1	7
CineFest Miskolc International Film Festival	0	1
Cinémathèque française	1	1
Costume Designers Guild Awards	0	1
Critics Choice Awards	3	6
Dallas–Fort Worth Film Critics Association	4	4
Dorian Awards	5	9
Dublin Film Critics Circle	4	4
Edda Awards	0	1
European Film Awards	2	4
Florida Film Critics Circle	0	2
Georgia Film Critics Association	0	5
Golden Globe Awards	1	5
Golden Raspberry Awards	0	1
Gotham Awards	0	1
Hamptons International Film Festival	1	1
Hollywood Music in Media Awards	0	1
Houston Film Critics Society	0	4
IFTA Awards	1	2
Independent Spirit Awards	0	2
IndieWire Critics Poll	4	4
International Cinephile Society	1	4
Kansas City Film Critics Circle	6	7
London Film Critics' Circle	0	6
Los Angeles Film Critics Association	1	1
Make-Up Artists & Hair Stylists Guild Awards	2	3
New York Film Critics Online	4	4
Online Film Critics Society	4	8
Producers Guild of America Awards	0	1
The Queerties	0	1
San Diego Film Critics Society	1	4
San Francisco Bay Area Film Critics Circle	0	3
Santa Barbara International Film Festival	1	1
Satellite Awards	1	4
Saturn Awards	2	4
Savannah Film Festival	2	2
Screen Actors Guild Awards	1	1
Seattle Film Critics Society	2	7
Set Decorators Society of America Awards	0	1
SFFILM	1	1
St. Louis Film Critics Association	1	3
Toronto Film Critics Association	1	1
Toronto International Film Festival	1	1
Vancouver Film Critics Circle	1	2
Washington D.C. Area Film Critics Association	0	2
Women Film Critics Circle	4	4

Totals (Note: Certain award groups do not simply award one winner. They acknowledge several different recipients, have runners-up, and have third place. Since this is a specific recognition and is different from losing an award, runner-up mentions are considered wins in this award tally. For simplification and to avoid errors, each award in this list has been presumed to have had a prior nomination.)
- Wins: 85
- Nominations: 199

The Substance is a 2024 body horror film with satirical elements written and directed by Coralie Fargeat. It follows Elisabeth Sparkle (Demi Moore), a fading celebrity, who, after being fired by her producer (Dennis Quaid) due to her age, uses a black market drug that creates a much younger version of herself (Margaret Qualley) with unexpected side effects.

The film has received various awards and nominations from critics and industry organizations. It had its world premiere on May 19, 2024, in the main competition at the 77th Cannes Film Festival, competing for the Palme d'Or, where Fargeat was awarded Best Screenplay. At the 82nd Golden Globe Awards, Moore won Best Actress in a Motion Picture – Musical or Comedy, while the film was nominated for Best Motion Picture – Musical or Comedy.

At the 97th Academy Awards, the film was nominated for five Oscars, including Best Picture, Best Director for Fargeat and Best Actress for Moore, winning Best Makeup and Hairstyling; Fargeat became the ninth woman nominated for directing.

== Accolades ==
Award	Date of ceremony	Category	Recipient(s)	Result	Ref.
Cannes Film Festival	May 25, 2024	Palme d'Or	Coralie Fargeat	Nominated	
Cannes Film Festival	May 25, 2024	Best Screenplay	Coralie Fargeat	Won	
CineFest Miskolc International Film Festival	September 14, 2024	Emeric Pressburger Prize	The Substance	Nominated	
Toronto International Film Festival	September 15, 2024	People's Choice Midnight Madness Award	The Substance	Won	
Hamptons International Film Festival	October 5, 2024	Career Achievement in Acting Award	Demi Moore	Honored	
Savannah Film Festival	November 2, 2024	Icon Award	Demi Moore	Honored	
Savannah Film Festival	November 2, 2024	Luminary Award	Margaret Qualley	Honored	
Cinémathèque française	November 5, 2024	Career Tribute	Demi Moore	Honored	
Hollywood Music in Media Awards	November 20, 2024	Best Original Score – Horror/Thriller Film	Raffertie	Nominated	
Camerimage	November 23, 2024	Director's Debuts Competition	Benjamin Kračun	Withdrawn (Note: Pulled from competition by Fargeat due to negative comments about women in film by the festival director Marek Zydowicz.)	
Gotham Awards	December 2, 2024	Outstanding Lead Performance	Demi Moore	Nominated	
European Film Awards	December 7, 2024	European Film	The Substance	Nominated	
European Film Awards	December 7, 2024	European Screenwriter	Coralie Fargeat	Nominated	
European Film Awards	December 7, 2024	European Cinematography	Benjamin Kračun	Honored	
European Film Awards	December 7, 2024	European Visual Effects	Bryan Jones, Pierre Procoudine-Gorsky, Chervin Shafaghi, and Guillaume Le Gouez	Honored	
Astra Film and Creative Arts Awards	December 8, 2024	Best Picture	The Substance	Nominated	
Astra Film and Creative Arts Awards	December 8, 2024	Best Horror or Thriller Feature	The Substance	Won	
Astra Film and Creative Arts Awards	December 8, 2024	Best Director	Coralie Fargeat	Nominated	
Astra Film and Creative Arts Awards	December 8, 2024	Best Actress	Demi Moore	Nominated	
Astra Film and Creative Arts Awards	December 8, 2024	Best Performance in a Horror or Thriller	Demi Moore	Nominated	
Astra Film and Creative Arts Awards	December 8, 2024	Best Performance in a Horror or Thriller	Margaret Qualley	Nominated	
Astra Film and Creative Arts Awards	December 8, 2024	Best Supporting Actress	Margaret Qualley	Nominated	
Astra Film and Creative Arts Awards	December 8, 2024	Best Original Screenplay	Coralie Fargeat	Nominated	
Astra Film and Creative Arts Awards	December 8, 2024	Best Casting	Laure Cochener and Léa Moszkowicz	Nominated	
Astra Film and Creative Arts Awards	December 8, 2024	Best Makeup and Hairstyling	Pierre-Olivier Persin, Frederique Arguello	Won	
Los Angeles Film Critics Association	December 8, 2024	Best Lead Performance	Demi Moore	Runner-up (Note: Tied with Fernanda Torres for I'm Still Here.)	
Washington D.C. Area Film Critics Association	December 8, 2024	Best Actress	Demi Moore	Nominated	
Washington D.C. Area Film Critics Association	December 8, 2024	Best Original Screenplay	Coralie Fargeat	Nominated	
San Diego Film Critics Society	December 9, 2024	Best Director	Coralie Fargeat	Nominated	
San Diego Film Critics Society	December 9, 2024	Best Actress	Demi Moore	Nominated	
San Diego Film Critics Society	December 9, 2024	Best Original Screenplay	Coralie Fargeat	Nominated	
San Diego Film Critics Society	December 9, 2024	Best Visual Effects	The Substance	Won	
SFFILM	December 9, 2024	Maria Manetti Shrem Award for Acting	Demi Moore	Honored	
Chicago Film Critics Association	December 11, 2024	Best Film	The Substance	Nominated	
Chicago Film Critics Association	December 11, 2024	Best Director	Coralie Fargeat	Nominated	
Chicago Film Critics Association	December 11, 2024	Best Actress	Demi Moore	Nominated	
Chicago Film Critics Association	December 11, 2024	Best Supporting Actress	Margaret Qualley	Nominated	
Chicago Film Critics Association	December 11, 2024	Best Original Screenplay	Coralie Fargeat	Nominated	
Chicago Film Critics Association	December 11, 2024	Best Art Direction / Production Design	The Substance	Nominated	
Chicago Film Critics Association	December 11, 2024	Best Use of Visual Effects	The Substance	Won	
San Francisco Bay Area Film Critics Circle	December 15, 2024	Best Director	Coralie Fargeat	Nominated	
San Francisco Bay Area Film Critics Circle	December 15, 2024	Best Actress	Demi Moore	Nominated	
San Francisco Bay Area Film Critics Circle	December 15, 2024	Best Original Screenplay	Coralie Fargeat	Nominated	
St. Louis Film Critics Association	December 15, 2024	Best Actress	Demi Moore	Nominated	
St. Louis Film Critics Association	December 15, 2024	Best Horror Film	The Substance	Runner-up	
St. Louis Film Critics Association	December 15, 2024	Best Scene	New Year's Eve performance	Nominated	
Toronto Film Critics Association	December 15, 2024	Best Lead Performance	Demi Moore	Runner-up	
IndieWire Critics Poll	December 16, 2024	Best Film	The Substance	7th place	
IndieWire Critics Poll	December 16, 2024	Best Director	Coralie Fargeat	7th place	
IndieWire Critics Poll	December 16, 2024	Best Lead Performance	Demi Moore	4th place	
IndieWire Critics Poll	December 16, 2024	Best Screenplay	The Substance	6th place	
New York Film Critics Online	December 16, 2024	Best Picture	The Substance	Won	
New York Film Critics Online	December 16, 2024	Best Director	Coralie Fargeat	Won	
New York Film Critics Online	December 16, 2024	Best Actress	Demi Moore	Runner-up	
New York Film Critics Online	December 16, 2024	Best Screenplay	Coralie Fargeat	Runner-up	
Seattle Film Critics Society	December 16, 2024	Best Picture	The Substance	Won	
Seattle Film Critics Society	December 16, 2024	Best Director	Coralie Fargeat	Nominated	
Seattle Film Critics Society	December 16, 2024	Best Actress in a Leading Role	Demi Moore	Nominated	
Seattle Film Critics Society	December 16, 2024	Best Supporting Actress	Margaret Qualley	Won	
Seattle Film Critics Society	December 16, 2024	Best Screenplay	Coralie Fargeat	Nominated	
Seattle Film Critics Society	December 16, 2024	Best Editing	Coralie Fargeat, Jérôme Eltabet, and Valentin Féron	Nominated	
Seattle Film Critics Society	December 16, 2024	Best Visual Effects	Bryan Jones and Guillaume Le Gouez	Nominated	
Dallas–Fort Worth Film Critics Association	December 18, 2024	Best Film	The Substance	6th place	
Dallas–Fort Worth Film Critics Association	December 18, 2024	Best Director	Coralie Fargeat	4th place	
Dallas–Fort Worth Film Critics Association	December 18, 2024	Best Actress	Demi Moore	2nd place	
Dallas–Fort Worth Film Critics Association	December 18, 2024	Best Supporting Actress	Margaret Qualley	2nd place	
Black Film Critics Circle	December 19, 2024	Top 10 Films of the Year	The Substance	8th place	
Dublin Film Critics' Circle	December 19, 2024	Best Film	The Substance	3rd place	
Dublin Film Critics' Circle	December 19, 2024	Best Director	Coralie Fargeat	2nd place	
Dublin Film Critics' Circle	December 19, 2024	Best Actress	Demi Moore	2nd place	
Dublin Film Critics' Circle	December 19, 2024	Best Screenplay	Coralie Fargeat	4th place	
Florida Film Critics Circle	December 20, 2024	Best Supporting Actress	Margaret Qualley	Nominated	
Florida Film Critics Circle	December 20, 2024	Best Visual Effects	The Substance	Nominated	
Kansas City Film Critics Circle	January 4, 2025	Best Film	The Substance	Won	
Kansas City Film Critics Circle	January 4, 2025	Best Director	Coralie Fargeat	Won	
Kansas City Film Critics Circle	January 4, 2025	Best Actress	Demi Moore	Won (Note: Tied with Mikey Madison for Anora.)	
Kansas City Film Critics Circle	January 4, 2025	Best Supporting Actress	Margaret Qualley	Won	
Kansas City Film Critics Circle	January 4, 2025	Best Original Screenplay	Coralie Fargeat	Won	
Kansas City Film Critics Circle	January 4, 2025	Best Original Score	Raffertie	Nominated	
Kansas City Film Critics Circle	January 4, 2025	Vince Koehler Award for Best Science Fiction/Fantasy/Horror	The Substance	Won	
Golden Globe Awards	January 5, 2025	Best Motion Picture – Musical or Comedy	The Substance	Nominated	
Golden Globe Awards	January 5, 2025	Best Director	Coralie Fargeat	Nominated	
Golden Globe Awards	January 5, 2025	Best Actress in a Motion Picture – Musical or Comedy	Demi Moore	Won	
Golden Globe Awards	January 5, 2025	Best Supporting Actress – Motion Picture	Margaret Qualley	Nominated	
Golden Globe Awards	January 5, 2025	Best Screenplay	Coralie Fargeat	Nominated	
Austin Film Critics Association	January 6, 2025	Best Picture	The Substance	3rd place	
Austin Film Critics Association	January 6, 2025	Best Director	Coralie Fargeat	Nominated	
Austin Film Critics Association	January 6, 2025	Best Actress	Demi Moore	Nominated	
Austin Film Critics Association	January 6, 2025	Best Supporting Actress	Margaret Qualley	Won	
Austin Film Critics Association	January 6, 2025	Best Original Screenplay	Coralie Fargeat	Nominated	
Austin Film Critics Association	January 6, 2025	Best Cinematography	Benjamin Kračun	Nominated	
Austin Film Critics Association	January 6, 2025	Best Editing	Coralie Fargeat, Jérôme Eltabet, and Valentin Féron	Won	
Alliance of Women Film Journalists	January 7, 2025	Best Film	The Substance	Nominated	
Alliance of Women Film Journalists	January 7, 2025	Best Director	Coralie Fargeat	Won	
Alliance of Women Film Journalists	January 7, 2025	Best Actress	Demi Moore	Nominated	
Alliance of Women Film Journalists	January 7, 2025	Best Supporting Actress	Margaret Qualley	Nominated	
Alliance of Women Film Journalists	January 7, 2025	Best Original Screenplay	Coralie Fargeat	Won	
Alliance of Women Film Journalists	January 7, 2025	Best Editing	Coralie Fargeat, Jérôme Eltabet, and Valentin Féron	Nominated	
Alliance of Women Film Journalists	January 7, 2025	Best Woman Director	Coralie Fargeat	Won (Note: Tied with Payal Kapadia for All We Imagine as Light.)	
Alliance of Women Film Journalists	January 7, 2025	Best Female Screenwriter	Coralie Fargeat	Won	
Georgia Film Critics Association	January 7, 2025	Best Picture	The Substance	Nominated	
Georgia Film Critics Association	January 7, 2025	Best Director	Coralie Fargeat	Nominated	
Georgia Film Critics Association	January 7, 2025	Best Actress	Demi Moore	Nominated	
Georgia Film Critics Association	January 7, 2025	Best Supporting Actress	Margaret Qualley	Nominated	
Georgia Film Critics Association	January 7, 2025	Best Original Screenplay	Coralie Fargeat	Nominated	
Houston Film Critics Society	January 14, 2025	Best Picture	The Substance	Nominated	
Houston Film Critics Society	January 14, 2025	Best Director	Coralie Fargeat	Nominated	
Houston Film Critics Society	January 14, 2025	Best Actress	Demi Moore	Nominated	
Houston Film Critics Society	January 14, 2025	Best Supporting Actress	Margaret Qualley	Nominated	
Women Film Critics Circle	January 15, 2025	Best Movie by a Woman (directing)	Coralie Fargeat	Won	
Women Film Critics Circle	January 15, 2025	Best Woman Storyteller (Screenwriting Award)	Coralie Fargeat	Won	
Women Film Critics Circle	January 15, 2025	Best Actress	Demi Moore	Won	
Women Film Critics Circle	January 15, 2025	Adrienne Shelly Award (Note: For a film that most passionately opposes violence against women.)	The Substance	Won	
Satellite Awards	January 26, 2025	Best Motion Picture – Comedy or Musical	The Substance	Nominated	
Satellite Awards	January 26, 2025	Best Actress in a Motion Picture – Comedy or Musical	Demi Moore	Won	
Satellite Awards	January 26, 2025	Best Actress in a Supporting Role	Margaret Qualley	Nominated	
Satellite Awards	January 26, 2025	Best Original Screenplay	Coralie Fargeat	Nominated	
Online Film Critics Society	January 27, 2025	Best Picture	The Substance	2nd place	
Online Film Critics Society	January 27, 2025	Best Director	Coralie Fargeat	Won	
Online Film Critics Society	January 27, 2025	Best Actress	Demi Moore	Nominated	
Online Film Critics Society	January 27, 2025	Best Supporting Actress	Margaret Qualley	Won	
Online Film Critics Society	January 27, 2025	Best Original Screenplay	Coralie Fargeat	Nominated	
Online Film Critics Society	January 27, 2025	Best Editing	The Substance	Nominated	
Online Film Critics Society	January 27, 2025	Best Visual Effects	The Substance	Nominated	
Online Film Critics Society	January 27, 2025	Technical Achievement Award: Makeup &/or Hairstyling	The Substance	Honored	
London Film Critics' Circle	February 2, 2025	Film of the Year	The Substance	Nominated	
London Film Critics' Circle	February 2, 2025	Director of the Year	Coralie Fargeat	Nominated	
London Film Critics' Circle	February 2, 2025	Actress of the Year	Demi Moore	Nominated	
London Film Critics' Circle	February 2, 2025	Supporting Actress of the Year	Margaret Qualley	Nominated	
London Film Critics' Circle	February 2, 2025	Screenwriter of the Year	Coralie Fargeat	Nominated	
London Film Critics' Circle	February 2, 2025	Technical Achievement Award	Makeup (Stéphanie Guillon and Pierre-Olivier Persin)	Nominated	
Saturn Awards	February 2, 2025	Best Independent Film	The Substance	Nominated	
Saturn Awards	February 2, 2025	Best Actress in a Film	Demi Moore	Won	
Saturn Awards	February 2, 2025	Best Supporting Actress in a Film	Margaret Qualley	Nominated	
Saturn Awards	February 2, 2025	Best Film Make Up	Pierre-Olivier Persin	Won	
Costume Designers Guild Awards	February 6, 2025	Excellence in Contemporary Film	Emmanuelle Youchnovski	Nominated	
Critics Choice Awards	February 7, 2025	Best Picture	The Substance	Nominated	
Critics Choice Awards	February 7, 2025	Best Director	Coralie Fargeat	Nominated	
Critics Choice Awards	February 7, 2025	Best Actress	Demi Moore	Won	
Critics Choice Awards	February 7, 2025	Best Supporting Actress	Margaret Qualley	Nominated	
Critics Choice Awards	February 7, 2025	Best Original Screenplay	Coralie Fargeat	Won	
Critics Choice Awards	February 7, 2025	Best Hair and Make-Up	Pierre-Olivier Persin, Frederique Arguello, Stephanie Guillon	Won	
Critics Choice Awards	February 7, 2025	Best Visual Effects	Visual Effects Team	Nominated	
Set Decorators Society of America Awards	February 7, 2025	Best Achievement in Décor/Design of a Contemporary Feature Film	Cécilia Blom and Stanislas Reydellet	Nominated	
AARP Movies for Grownups Awards	February 8, 2025	Best Actress	Demi Moore	Won	
Producers Guild of America Awards	February 8, 2025	Darryl F. Zanuck Award for Outstanding Producer of Theatrical Motion Pictures	Coralie Fargeat, Tim Bevan, and Eric Fellner	Nominated	
International Cinephile Society	February 9, 2025	Best Picture	The Substance	20th place	
International Cinephile Society	February 9, 2025	Best Actress	Demi Moore	Nominated	
International Cinephile Society	February 9, 2025	Best Production Design	Stanislas Reydellet	Nominated	
International Cinephile Society	February 9, 2025	Best Sound Design	Valérie Deloof and Victor Fleurant	Nominated	
Santa Barbara International Film Festival	February 10, 2025	Outstanding Director of the Year	Coralie Fargeat	Honored	
Dorian Awards	February 13, 2025	Film of the Year	The Substance	Won	
Dorian Awards	February 13, 2025	Director of the Year	Coralie Fargeat	Won	
Dorian Awards	February 13, 2025	Film Performance of the Year	Demi Moore	Won	
Dorian Awards	February 13, 2025	Supporting Film Performance of the Year	Margaret Qualley	Nominated	
Dorian Awards	February 13, 2025	Screenplay of the Year	Coralie Fargeat	Nominated	
Dorian Awards	February 13, 2025	Wilde Artist Award	Coralie Fargeat	Nominated	
Dorian Awards	February 13, 2025	Genre Film of the Year	The Substance	Won	
Dorian Awards	February 13, 2025	Visually Striking Film of the Year	The Substance	Nominated	
Dorian Awards	February 13, 2025	Campiest Flick	The Substance	Won	
Irish Film & Television Academy Awards	February 14, 2025	Best International Film	The Substance	Nominated	
Irish Film & Television Academy Awards	February 14, 2025	Best International Actress	Demi Moore	Won	
Art Directors Guild Awards	February 15, 2025	Excellence in Production Design for a Contemporary Feature Film	Stanislas Reydellet	Nominated	
Make-Up Artists & Hair Stylists Guild Awards	February 15, 2025	Best Contemporary Make-Up in a Feature-Length Motion Picture	Stéphanie Guillon	Won	
Make-Up Artists & Hair Stylists Guild Awards	February 15, 2025	Best Contemporary Hair Styling in a Feature-Length Motion Picture	Frédérique Arguello	Nominated	
Make-Up Artists & Hair Stylists Guild Awards	February 15, 2025	Best Special Make-Up Effects in a Feature-Length Motion Picture	Pierre-Olivier Persin	Won	
British Academy Film Awards	February 16, 2025	Best Director	Coralie Fargeat	Nominated	
British Academy Film Awards	February 16, 2025	Best Actress in a Leading Role	Demi Moore	Nominated	
British Academy Film Awards	February 16, 2025	Best Original Screenplay	Coralie Fargeat	Nominated	
British Academy Film Awards	February 16, 2025	Best Make Up & Hair	Pierre-Olivier Persin, Stéphanie Guillon, Frédérique Arguello, and Marilyne Scarselli	Won	
British Academy Film Awards	February 16, 2025	Best Sound	Valérie Deloof, Victor Fleurant, Victor Praud, Stéphane Thiébaut, and Emmanuelle Villard	Nominated	
Vancouver Film Critics Circle	February 18, 2025	Best Female Actor	Demi Moore	Nominated	
Vancouver Film Critics Circle	February 18, 2025	Best Supporting Female Actor	Margaret Qualley	Won	
Independent Spirit Awards	February 22, 2025	Best Feature	Tim Bevan, Coralie Fargeat, and Eric Fellner	Nominated	
Independent Spirit Awards	February 22, 2025	Best Lead Performance	Demi Moore	Nominated	
Screen Actors Guild Awards	February 23, 2025	Outstanding Performance by a Female Actor in a Leading Role in a Motion Picture	Demi Moore	Won	
César Awards	February 28, 2025	Best Foreign Film	Coralie Fargeat	Nominated	
Golden Raspberry Awards	February 28, 2025	Razzie Redeemer Award	Demi Moore	Nominated	
Academy Awards	March 2, 2025	Best Picture	Coralie Fargeat, Tim Bevan, and Eric Fellner	Nominated	
Academy Awards	March 2, 2025	Best Director	Coralie Fargeat	Nominated	
Academy Awards	March 2, 2025	Best Actress	Demi Moore	Nominated	
Academy Awards	March 2, 2025	Best Original Screenplay	Coralie Fargeat	Nominated	
Academy Awards	March 2, 2025	Best Makeup and Hairstyling	Pierre-Olivier Persin, Stéphanie Guillon, and Marilyne Scarselli	Won	
The Queerties	March 11, 2025	Film Performance	Demi Moore	Nominated	
American Cinema Editors Awards	March 14, 2025	Best Edited Feature Film (Comedy, Theatrical)	Coralie Fargeat, Jérôme Eltabet, and Valentin Féron	Nominated	
Bodil Awards	March 15, 2025	Best English Language Film	The Substance	Nominated	
Edda Awards	March 26, 2025	Foreign Film of the Year	The Substance	Nominated	
Ivor Novello Awards	May 22, 2025	Best Original Film Score	Raffertie	Won	
Golden Trailer Awards	May 29, 2025	Best Teaser	Mubi / Mubi Lab	Nominated	
Bram Stoker Award	July 07, 2025	Superior Achievement in a Screenplay	Coralie Fargeat	Won	
Critics' Choice Super Awards	August 7, 2025	Best Horror Movie	The Substance	Nominated	
Critics' Choice Super Awards	August 7, 2025	Best Actress in a Horror Movie	Demi Moore	Won	
Fangoria Chainsaw Awards	October 19, 2025	Best Wide Release	The Substance	Nominated	
Fangoria Chainsaw Awards	October 19, 2025	Best Director	Coralie Fargeat	Nominated	
Fangoria Chainsaw Awards	October 19, 2025	Best Screenplay	Coralie Fargeat	Nominated	
Fangoria Chainsaw Awards	October 19, 2025	Best Lead Performance	Demi Moore	Won	
Fangoria Chainsaw Awards	October 19, 2025	Best Supporting Performance	Margaret Qualley	Nominated	
Fangoria Chainsaw Awards	October 19, 2025	Best Cinematography	Benjamin Kračun	Nominated	
Fangoria Chainsaw Awards	October 19, 2025	Best Score	Raffertie	Nominated	
Fangoria Chainsaw Awards	October 19, 2025	Best Costume Design	Emmanuelle Youchnovski	Nominated	
Fangoria Chainsaw Awards	October 19, 2025	Best Make-Up FX	Pierre-Olivier Persin, Stéphanie Guillon	Won	
Fangoria Chainsaw Awards	October 19, 2025	Best Creature FX	Pierre-Olivier Persin	Won	
