= 30th Critics' Choice Awards =

2025 US film and television awards

- Official poster
- Date: February 7, 2025
- Site: Barker Hangar, Santa Monica, California, United States
- Hosted by: Chelsea Handler

Highlights
- Most wins: Film: Emilia Pérez / The Substance / Wicked (3); Television: Shōgun (4)
- Most nominations: Film: Conclave / Wicked (11); Television: Shōgun (6)
- Best Picture: Anora
- Best Comedy Series: Hacks
- Best Drama Series: Shōgun
- Best Limited Series: Baby Reindeer
- Best Movie Made for Television: Rebel Ridge
- Website: www.criticschoice.com

Television/radio coverage
- Network: E! / Peacock (streaming)

The 30th Critics' Choice Awards were presented on February 7, 2025, at the Barker Hangar at the Santa Monica Airport in Santa Monica, California, honoring the finest achievements of filmmaking and television programming in 2024. The ceremony was originally scheduled to be held on January 12, but was postponed twice due to the series of wildfires in Southern California. It was broadcast on E! and was made available to stream the next day on Peacock. Chelsea Handler returned as host for the third consecutive year.

Like in the previous four years, film and television nominations were announced separately. The television nominations were announced on December 5, 2024. The film nominations were announced on December 12, 2024.

Conclave and Wicked led the film nominations with eleven each, followed by Dune: Part Two and Emilia Pérez with ten apiece. Shōgun led the television nominations with six, followed by Abbott Elementary, The Diplomat, Disclaimer, Hacks, The Penguin and What We Do in the Shadows with four each.

With its win, Anora became the first ever film in CCA history to win Best Picture as its only award.

== Winners and nominees ==
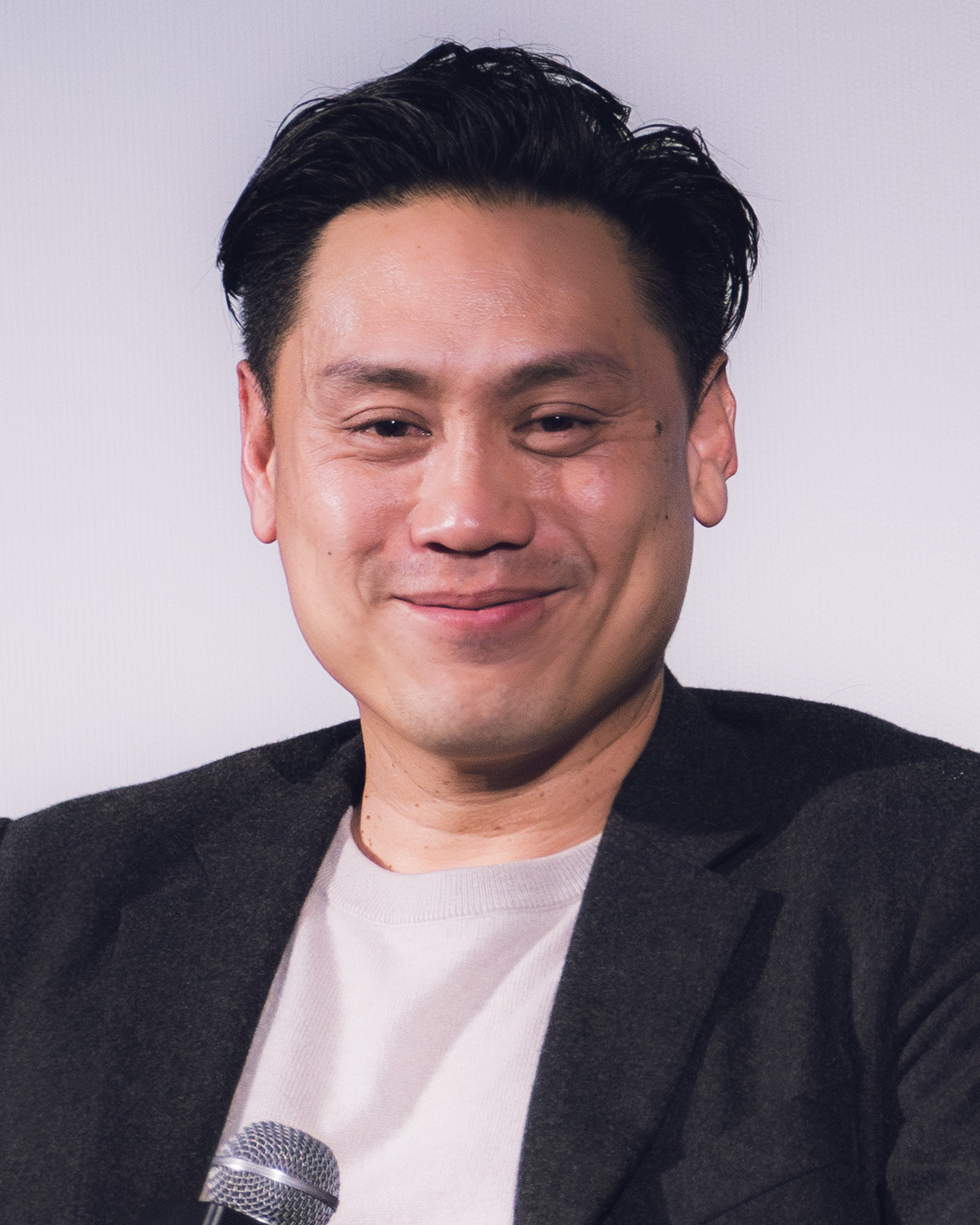
Jon M. Chu, Best Director winner

Adrien Brody, Best Actor winner

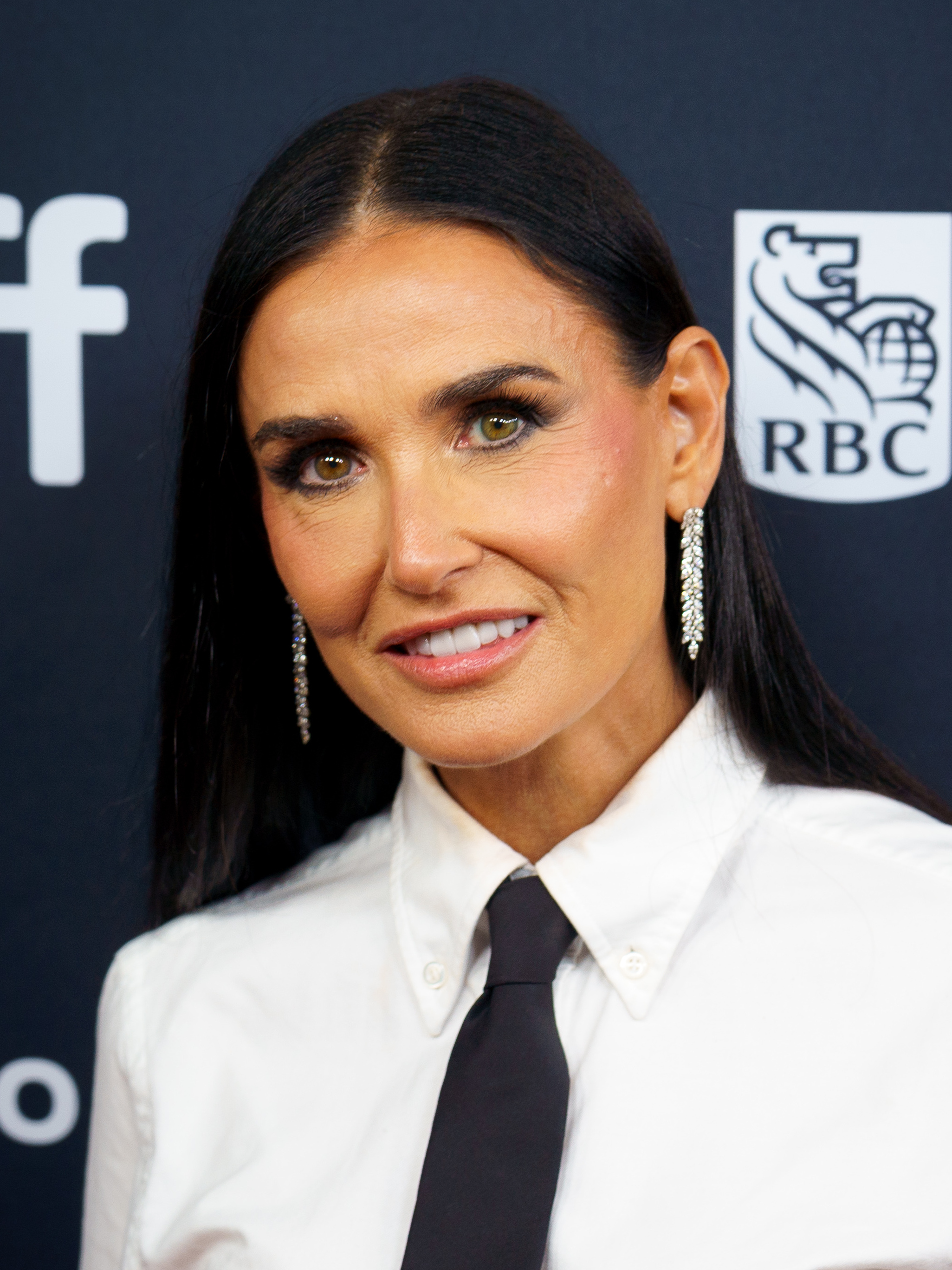
Demi Moore, Best Actress winner

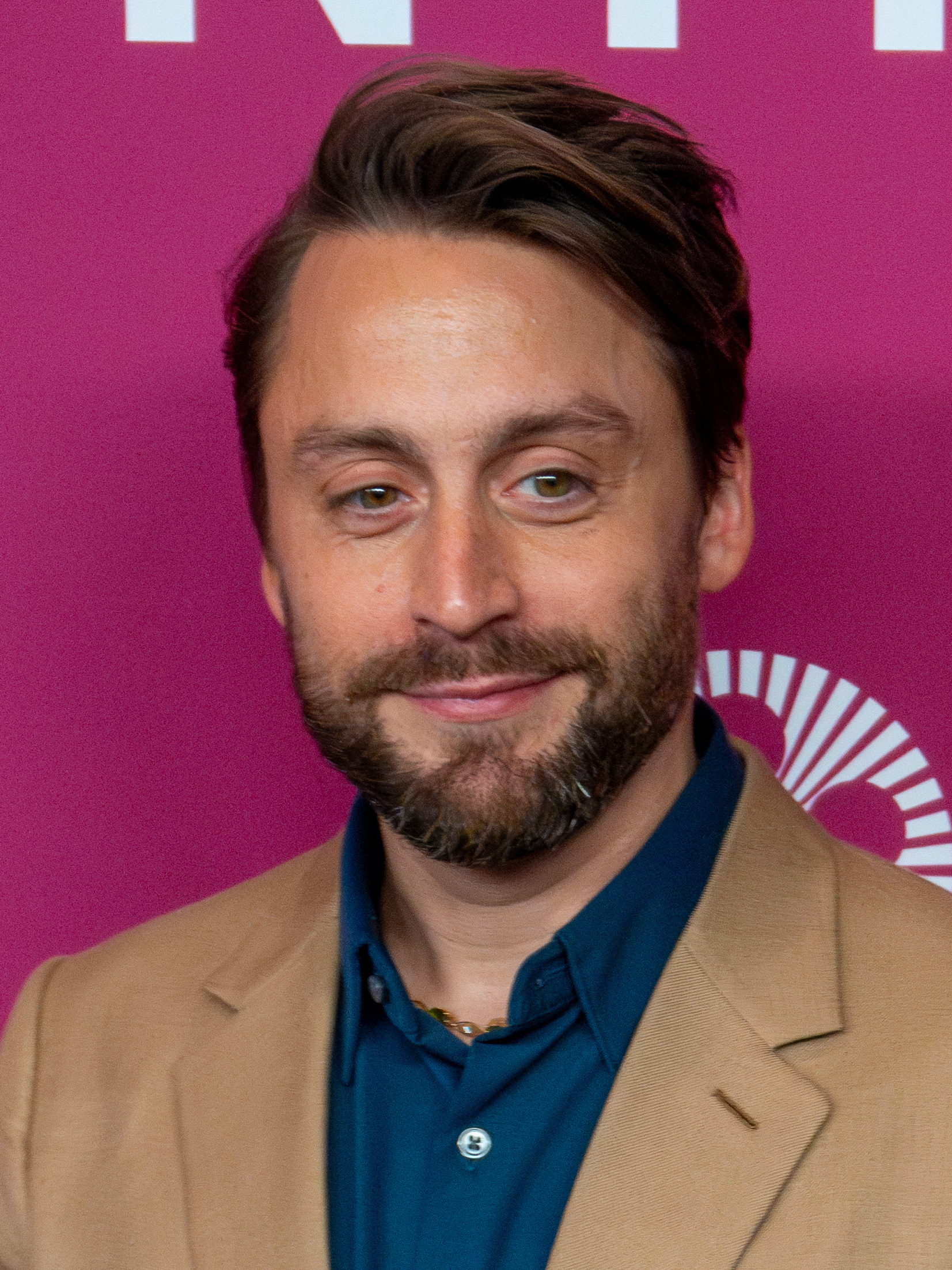
Kieran Culkin, Best Supporting Actor winner

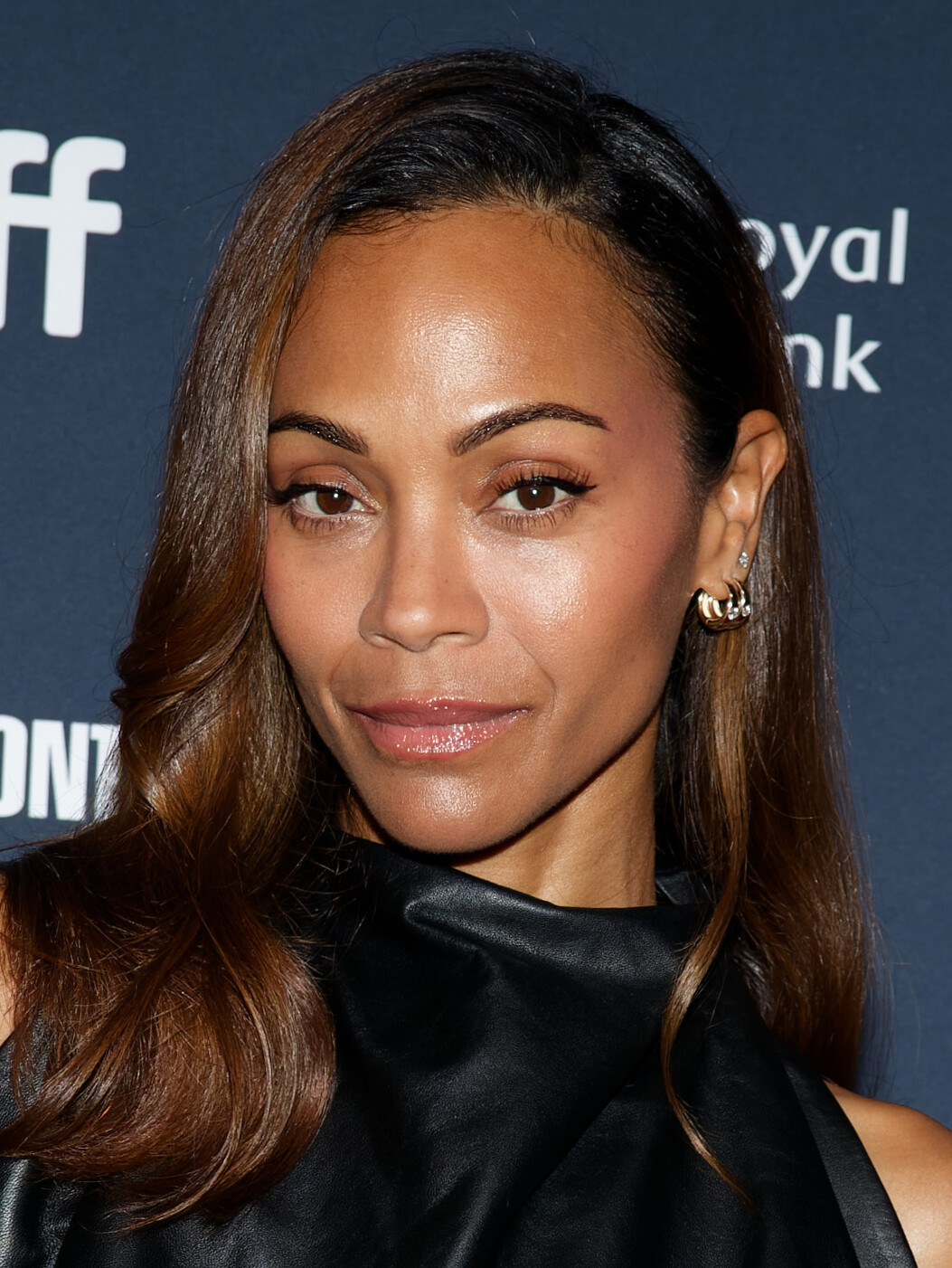
Zoe Saldaña, Best Supporting Actress winner

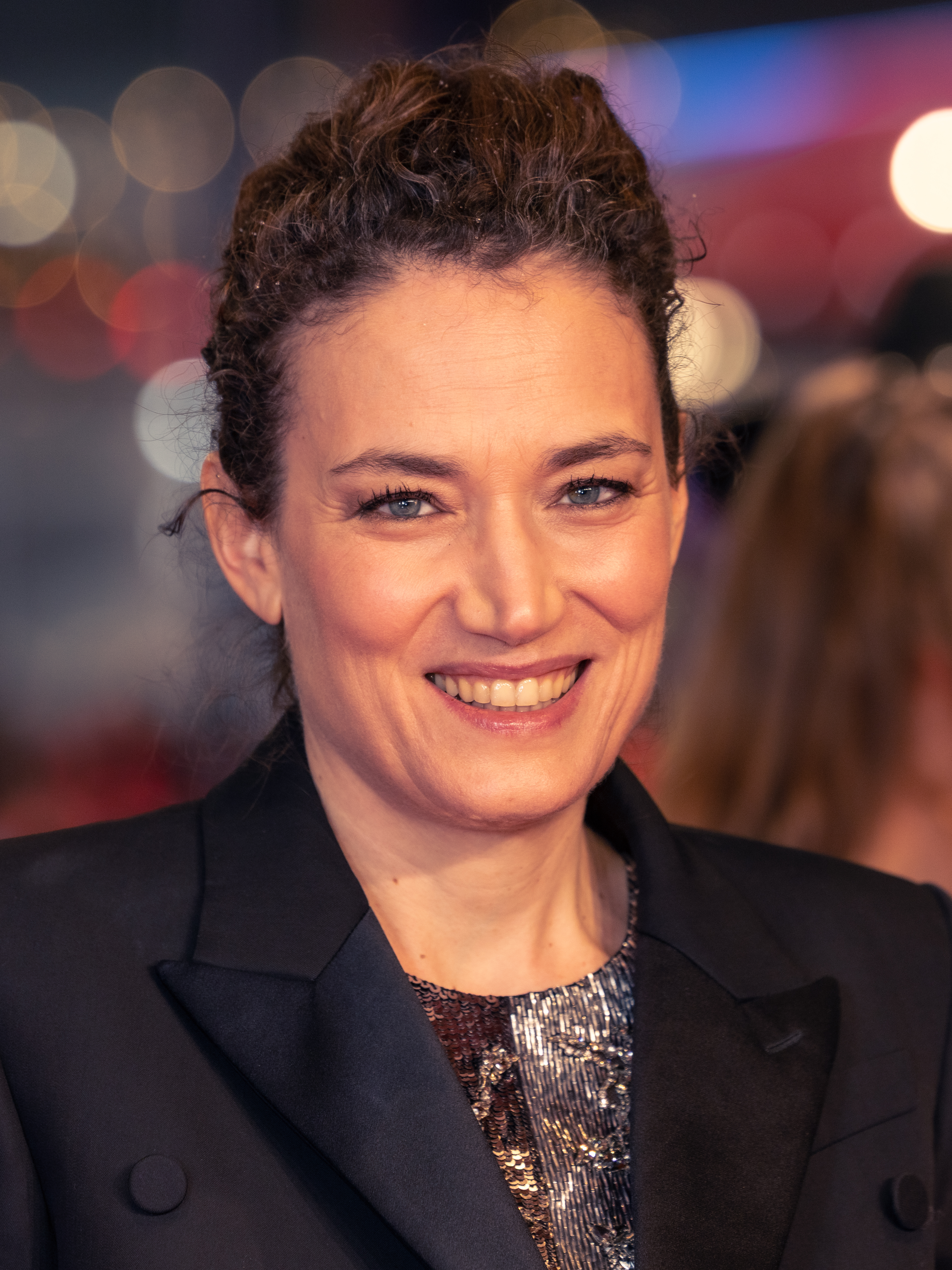
Coralie Fargeat, Best Original Screenplay winner

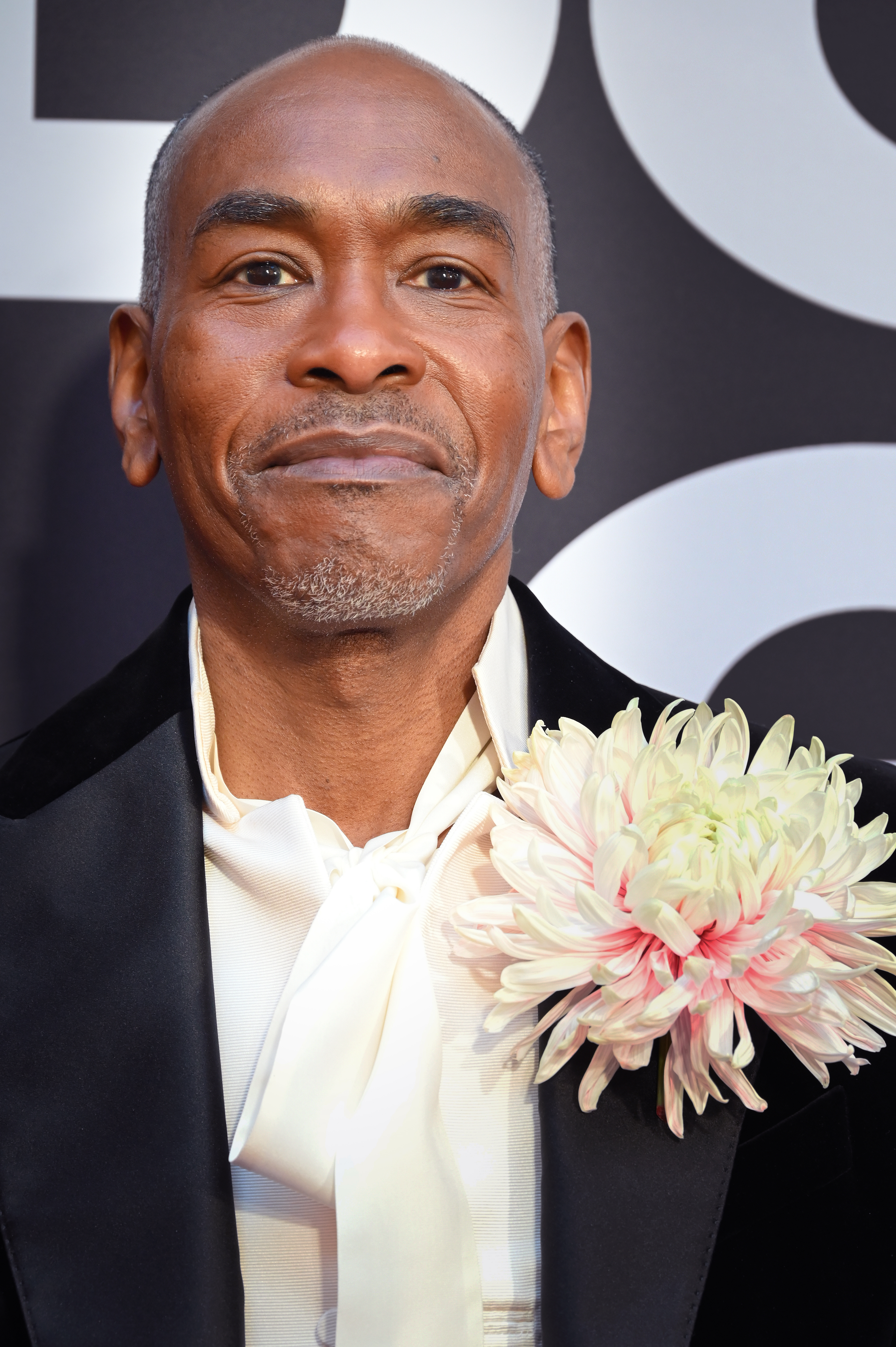
Paul Tazewell, Best Costume Design winner

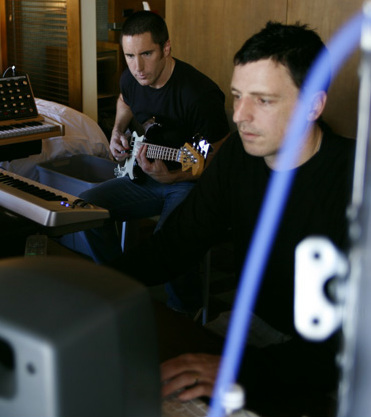
Trent Reznor and Atticus Ross, Best Score winners

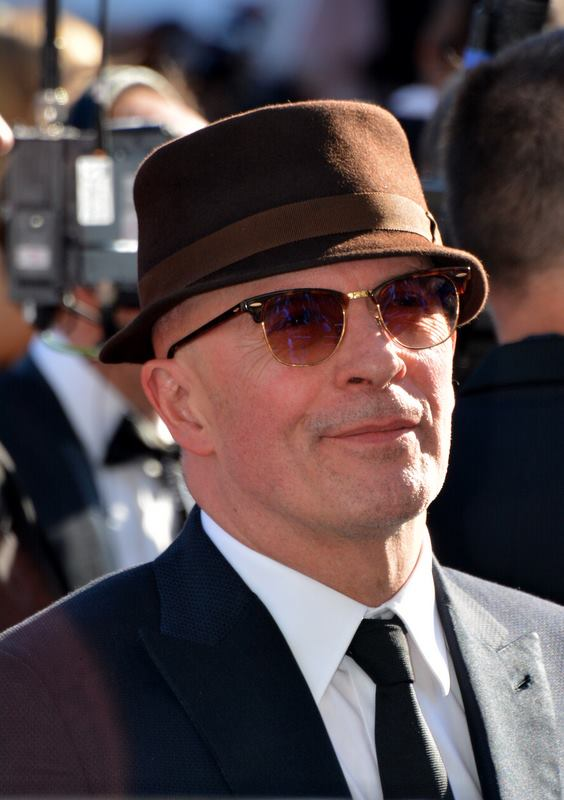
Jacques Audiard, Best Song co-winner

=== Film ===
Best Picture: Anora; The Brutalist; A Complete Unknown; Conclave; Dune: Part Two (Note: Won Best Science Fiction/Fantasy Movie at the 5th Critics' Choice Super Awards); Emilia Pérez; Nickel Boys; Sing Sing; The Substance (Note: Nominated for Best Horror Movie at the 5th Critics' Choice Super Awards); Wicked	Best Director: Jon M. Chu – Wicked; Jacques Audiard – Emilia Pérez; Sean Baker – Anora; Edward Berger – Conclave; Brady Corbet – The Brutalist; Coralie Fargeat – The Substance; RaMell Ross – Nickel Boys; Denis Villeneuve – Dune: Part Two
Best Actor: Adrien Brody – The Brutalist as László Tóth; Timothée Chalamet – A Complete Unknown as Bob Dylan; Daniel Craig – Queer as William Lee; Colman Domingo – Sing Sing as John "Divine G" Whitfield; Ralph Fiennes – Conclave as Cardinal Thomas Lawrence; Hugh Grant – Heretic as Mr. Reed (Note: Nominated for Best Actor in a Horror Movie at the 5th Critics' Choice Super Awards) (Note: Won Best Villain in a Movie at the 5th Critics' Choice Super Awards)	Best Actress: Demi Moore – The Substance as Elisabeth Sparkle (Note: Won Best Actress in a Horror Movie at the 5th Critics' Choice Super Awards); Cynthia Erivo – Wicked as Elphaba Thropp; Karla Sofía Gascón – Emilia Pérez as Emilia Pérez / Juan "Manitas" Del Monte; Marianne Jean-Baptiste – Hard Truths as Pansy Deacon; Angelina Jolie – Maria as Maria Callas; Mikey Madison – Anora as Anora "Ani" Mikheeva
Best Supporting Actor: Kieran Culkin – A Real Pain as Benji Kaplan; Yura Borisov – Anora as Igor; Clarence Maclin – Sing Sing as Clarence "Divine Eye" Maclin; Edward Norton – A Complete Unknown as Pete Seeger; Guy Pearce – The Brutalist as Harrison Lee Van Buren Sr.; Denzel Washington – Gladiator II as Macrinus (Note: Nominated for Best Villain in a Movie at the 5th Critics' Choice Super Awards)	Best Supporting Actress: Zoe Saldaña – Emilia Pérez as Rita Mora Castro; Danielle Deadwyler – The Piano Lesson as Berniece Charles; Aunjanue Ellis-Taylor – Nickel Boys as Hattie Curtis; Ariana Grande – Wicked as Galinda "Glinda" Upland; Margaret Qualley – The Substance as Sue; Isabella Rossellini – Conclave as Sister Agnes
Best Young Actor/Actress: Maisy Stella – My Old Ass as Elliott LaBrant; Alyla Browne – Furiosa: A Mad Max Saga as Young Furiosa; Elliott Heffernan – Blitz as George; Izaac Wang – Dìdi as Chris Wang; Alisha Weir – Abigail as Abigail Lazaar; Zoe Ziegler – Janet Planet as Lacy	Best Acting Ensemble: Conclave; Anora; Emilia Pérez; Saturday Night; Sing Sing; Wicked
Best Original Screenplay: Coralie Fargeat – The Substance; Sean Baker – Anora; Moritz Binder, Tim Fehlbaum, and Alex David – September 5; Brady Corbet and Mona Fastvold – The Brutalist; Jesse Eisenberg – A Real Pain; Justin Kuritzkes – Challengers	Best Adapted Screenplay: Peter Straughan – Conclave; Jacques Audiard – Emilia Pérez; Winnie Holzman and Dana Fox – Wicked; Greg Kwedar and Clint Bentley – Sing Sing; RaMell Ross and Joslyn Barnes – Nickel Boys; Denis Villeneuve and Jon Spaihts – Dune: Part Two
Best Cinematography: Jarin Blaschke – Nosferatu; Alice Brooks – Wicked; Lol Crawley – The Brutalist; Stéphane Fontaine – Conclave; Greig Fraser – Dune: Part Two; Jomo Fray – Nickel Boys	Best Editing: Marco Costa – Challengers; Sean Baker – Anora; Nick Emerson – Conclave; Dávid Jancsó – The Brutalist; Joe Walker – Dune: Part Two; Hansjörg Weißbrich – September 5
Best Costume Design: Paul Tazewell – Wicked; Lisy Christl – Conclave; Linda Muir – Nosferatu; Massimo Cantini Parrini – Maria; Jacqueline West – Dune: Part Two; Janty Yates and Dave Crossman – Gladiator II	Best Production Design: Nathan Crowley and Lee Sandales – Wicked; Judy Becker and Patricia Cuccia – The Brutalist; Suzie Davies and Cynthia Sleiter – Conclave; Craig Lathrop and Beatrice Brentnerová – Nosferatu; Arthur Max, Jille Azis, and Elli Griff – Gladiator II; Patrice Vermette and Shane Vieau – Dune: Part Two
Best Score: Trent Reznor and Atticus Ross – Challengers; Volker Bertelmann – Conclave; Daniel Blumberg – The Brutalist; Kris Bowers – The Wild Robot; Clément Ducol and Camille – Emilia Pérez; Hans Zimmer – Dune: Part Two	Best Song: "El Mal" (Written by Clément Ducol, Camille, and Jacques Audiard; performed by Zoe Saldaña, Karla Sofía Gascón, and Camille) – Emilia Pérez; "Beautiful That Way" (Written by Andrew Wyatt, Miley Cyrus, and Lykke Li; performed by Cyrus) – The Last Showgirl; "Compress / Repress" (Written by Trent Reznor, Atticus Ross, and Luca Guadagnino; performed by Reznor and Ross) – Challengers; "Harper and Will Go West" (Written by Sean Douglas, Josh Greenbaum, and Kristen Wiig; performed by Wiig) – Will & Harper; "Kiss the Sky" (Written by Delacey, Jordan K. Johnson, Stefan Johnson, Maren Morris, Michael Pollack, and Ali Tamposi; performed by Morris) – The Wild Robot; "Mi camino" (Written by Clément Ducol and Camille; performed by Selena Gomez) – Emilia Pérez
Best Hair and Makeup: Stéphanie Guillon, Frédérique Arguello, and Pierre-Olivier Persin – The Substance; Christine Blundell, Lesa Warrener, and Neal Scanlan – Beetlejuice Beetlejuice; Hair and Makeup Team – Dune: Part Two; Frances Hannon, Sarah Nuth, and Laura Blount – Wicked; Traci Loader, Suzanne Stokes-Munton, and David White – Nosferatu; Mike Marino, Sarah Graalman, and Aaron Saucier – A Different Man	Best Visual Effects: Paul Lambert, Stephen James, Rhys Salcombe, and Gerd Nefzer – Dune: Part Two; Mark Bakowski, Pietro Ponti, Nikki Penny, and Neil Corbould – Gladiator II; Pablo Helman, Jonathan Fawkner, Paul Corbould, and David Shirk – Wicked; Luke Millar, David Clayton, Keith Herft, and Peter Stubbs – Better Man; Bryan Jones, Chervin Shafaghi, Pierre-Olivier Persin, and Jean Miel – The Substance; Erik Winquist, Stephen Unterfranz, Paul Story, and Rodney Burke – Kingdom of the Planet of the Apes
Best Comedy: Deadpool & Wolverine (TIE) (Note: Won Best Superhero Movie at the 5th Critics' Choice Super Awards); A Real Pain (TIE); Hit Man; My Old Ass; Saturday Night; Thelma	Best Animated Feature: The Wild Robot (Note: Nominated for Best Science Fiction/Fantasy Movie at the 5th Critics' Choice Super Awards); Flow; Inside Out 2; Memoir of a Snail; Wallace & Gromit: Vengeance Most Fowl
Best Foreign Language Film: Emilia Pérez • France; All We Imagine as Light • India; Flow • Latvia; I'm Still Here • Brazil; Kneecap • Ireland; The Seed of the Sacred Fig • Germany

=== Television ===
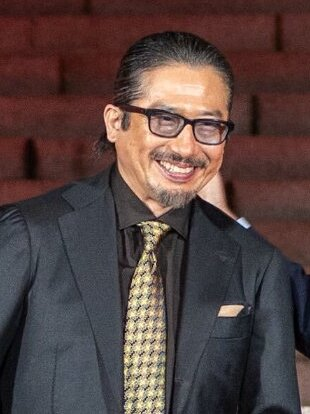
Hiroyuki Sanada, Best Actor in a Drama Series winner

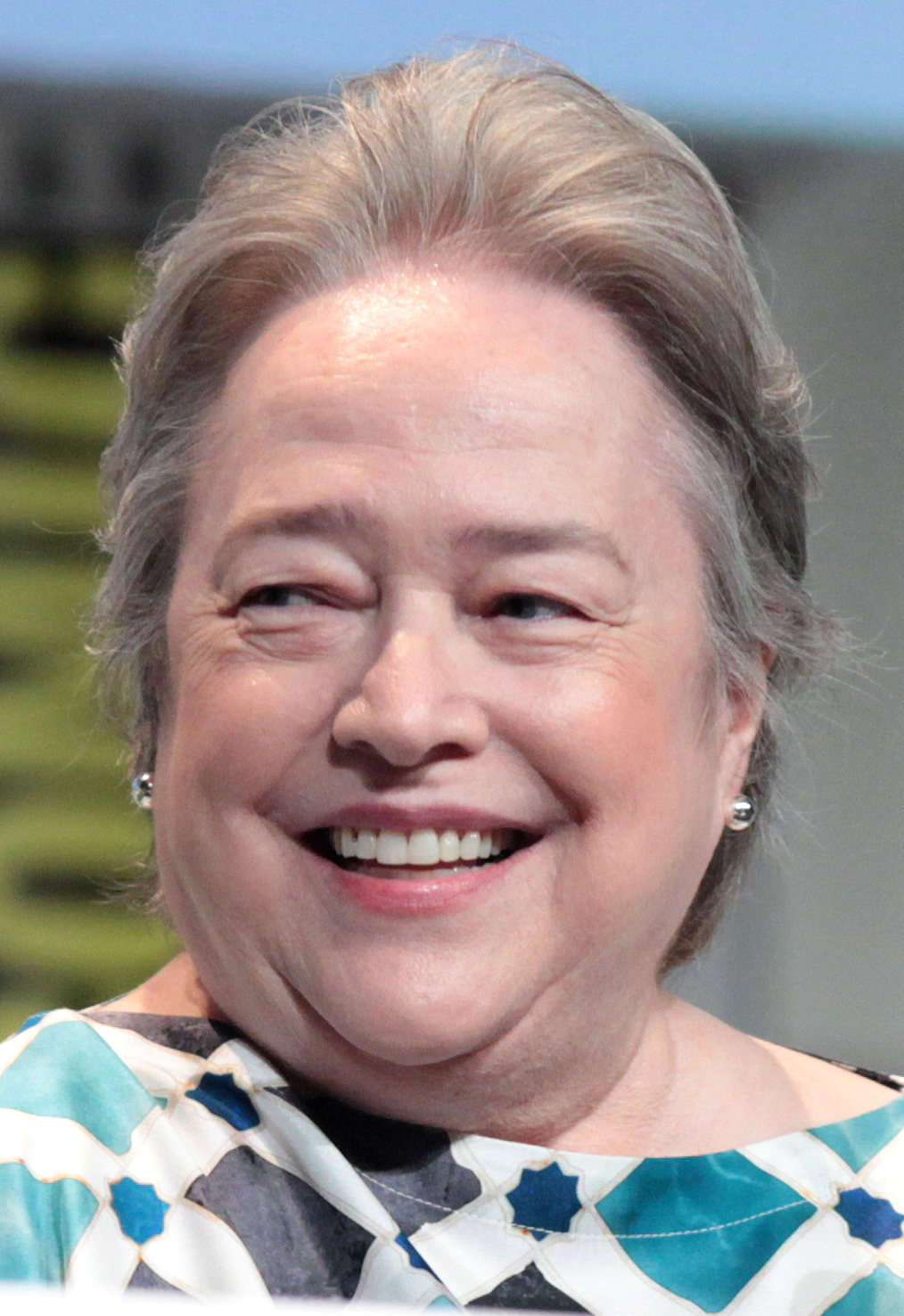
Kathy Bates, Best Actress in a Drama Series winner

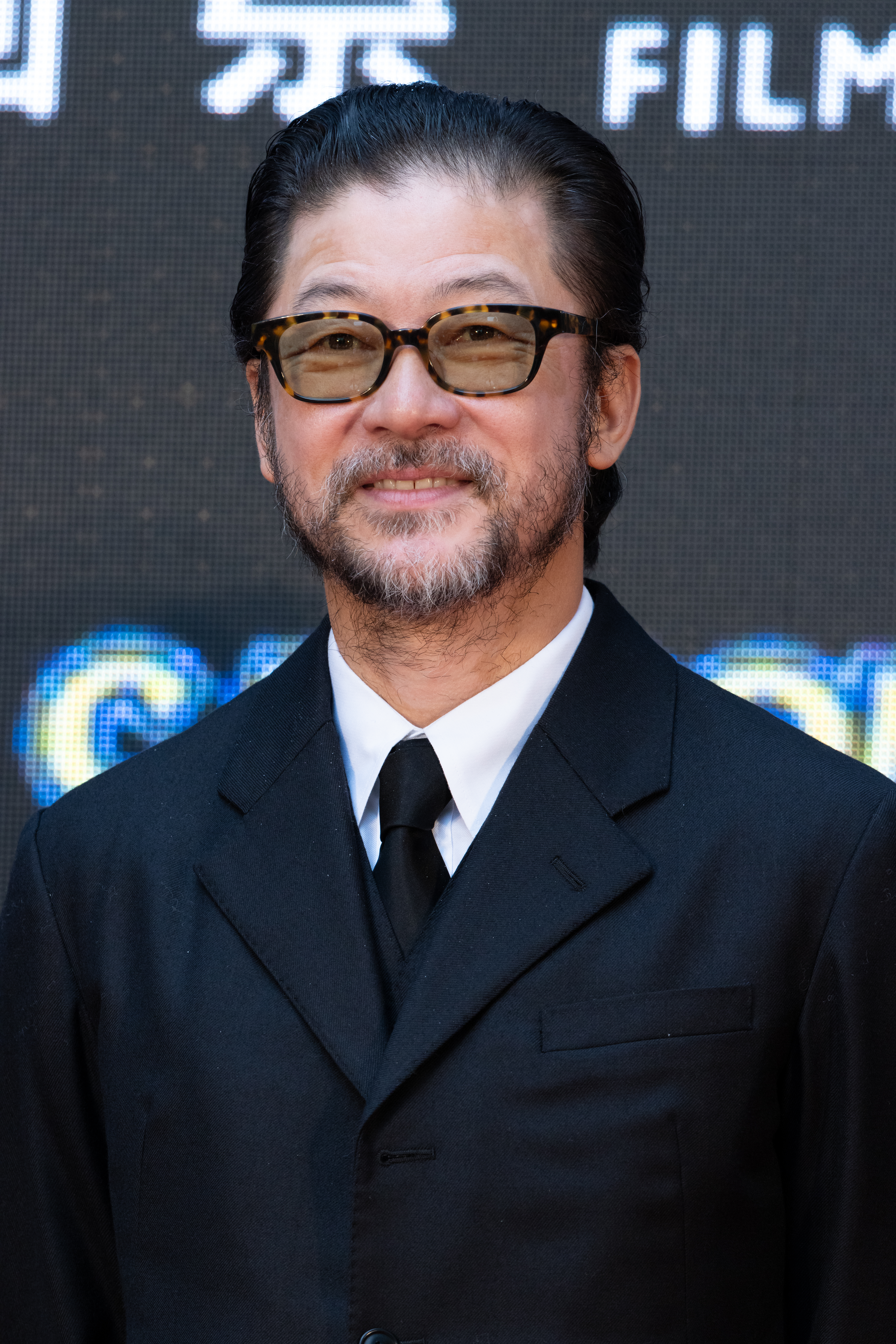
Tadanobu Asano, Best Supporting Actor in a Drama Series winner

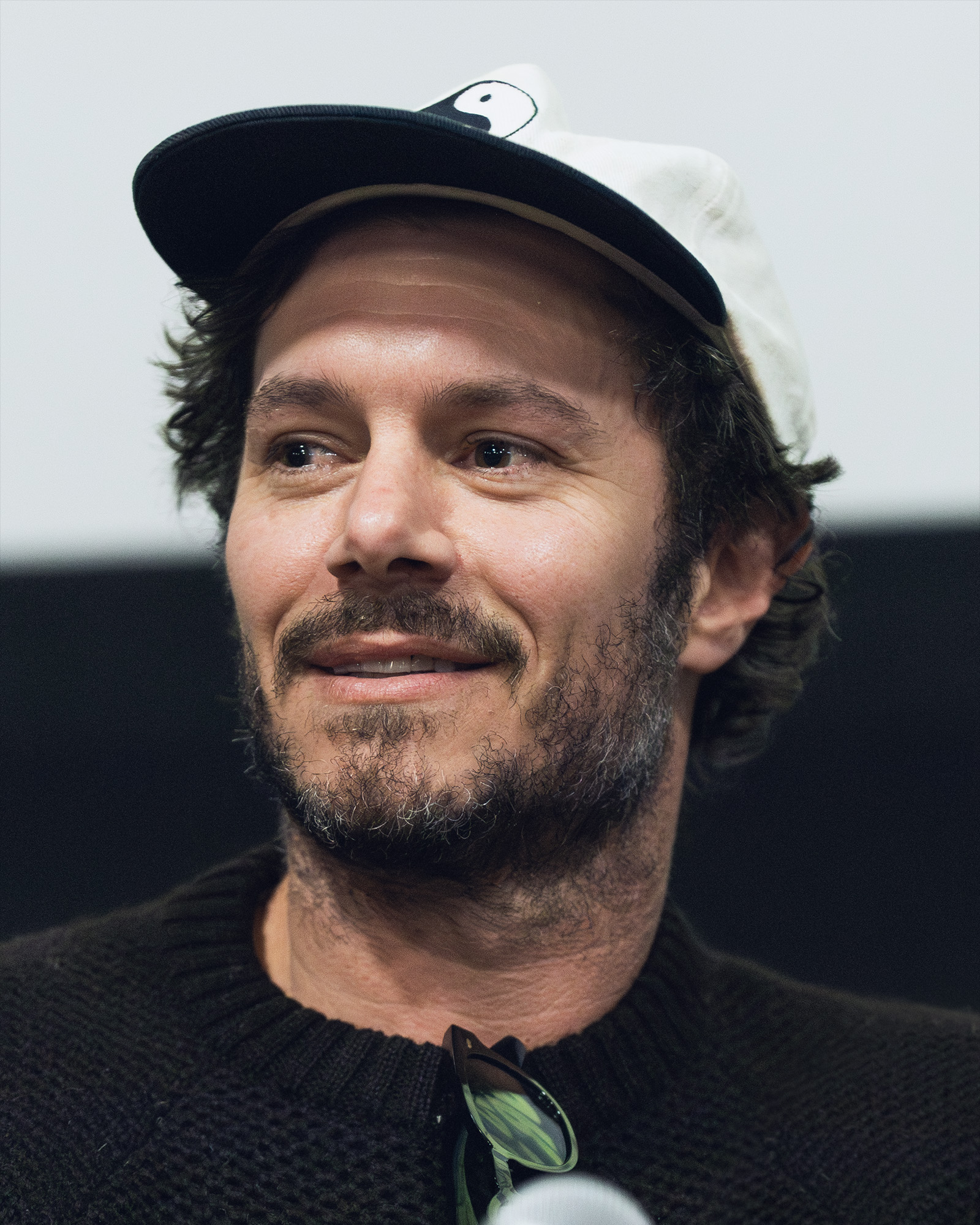
Adam Brody, Best Actor in a Comedy Series winner

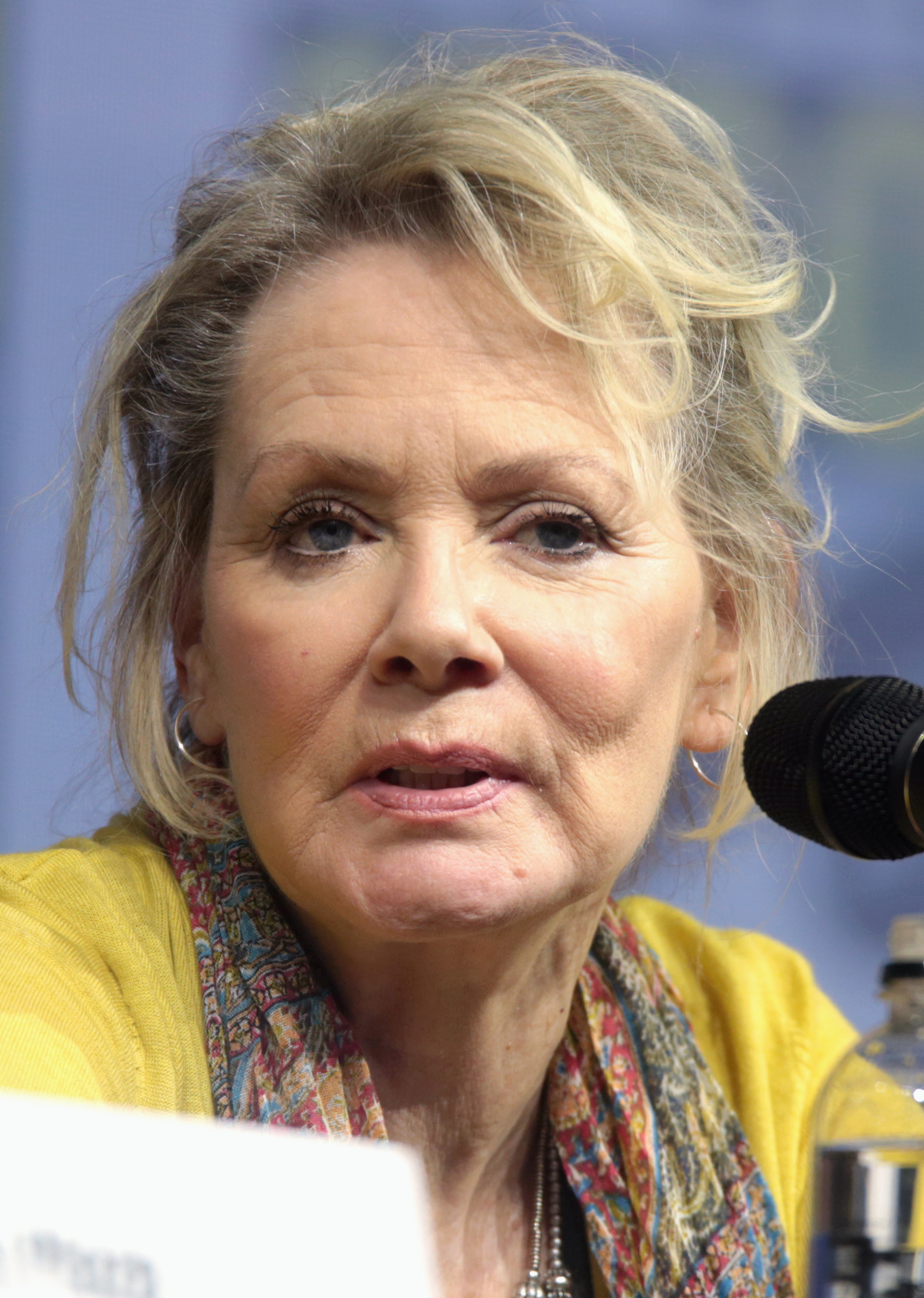
Jean Smart, Best Actress in a Comedy Series winner

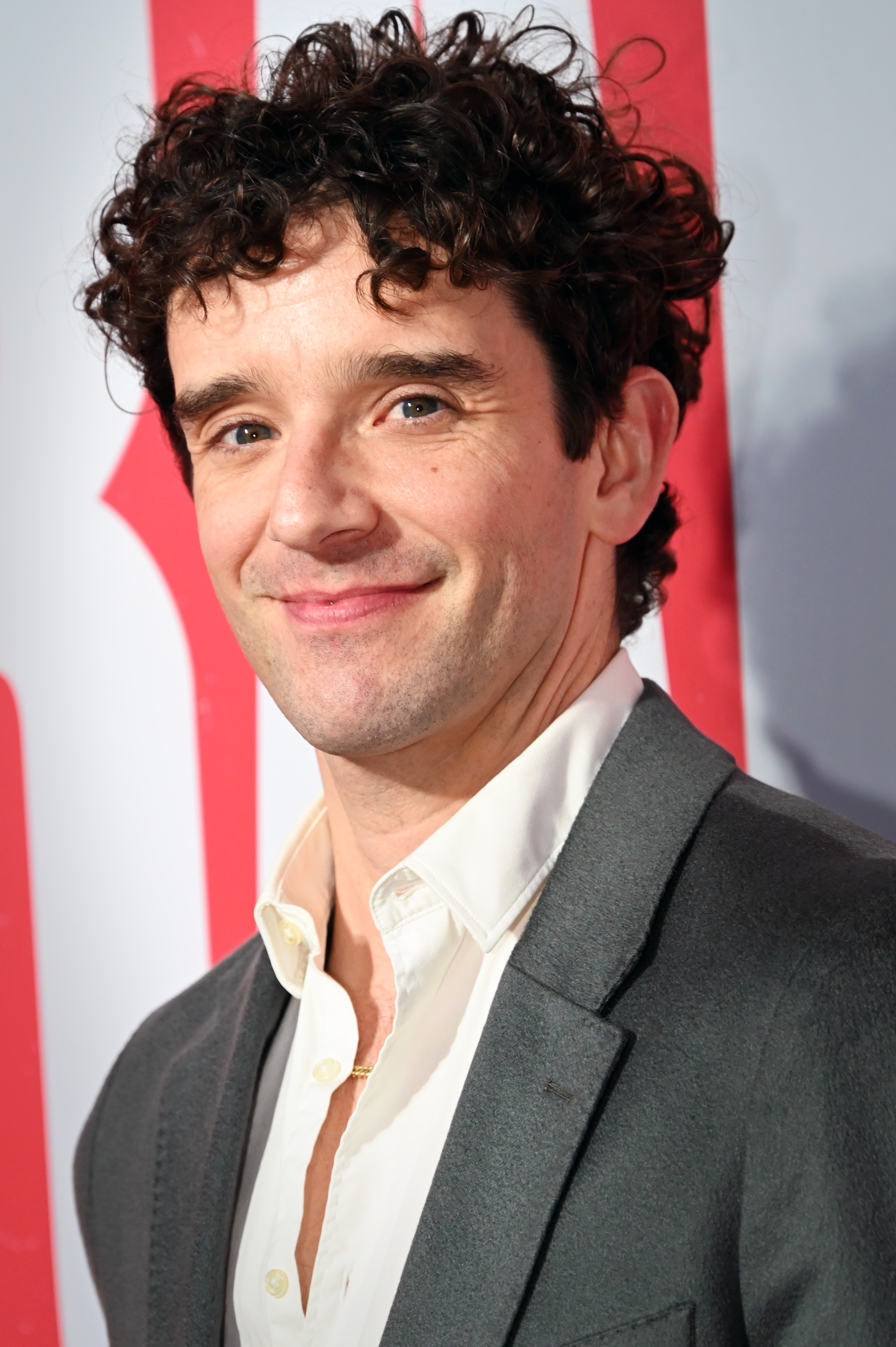
Michael Urie, Best Supporting Actor in a Comedy Series winner

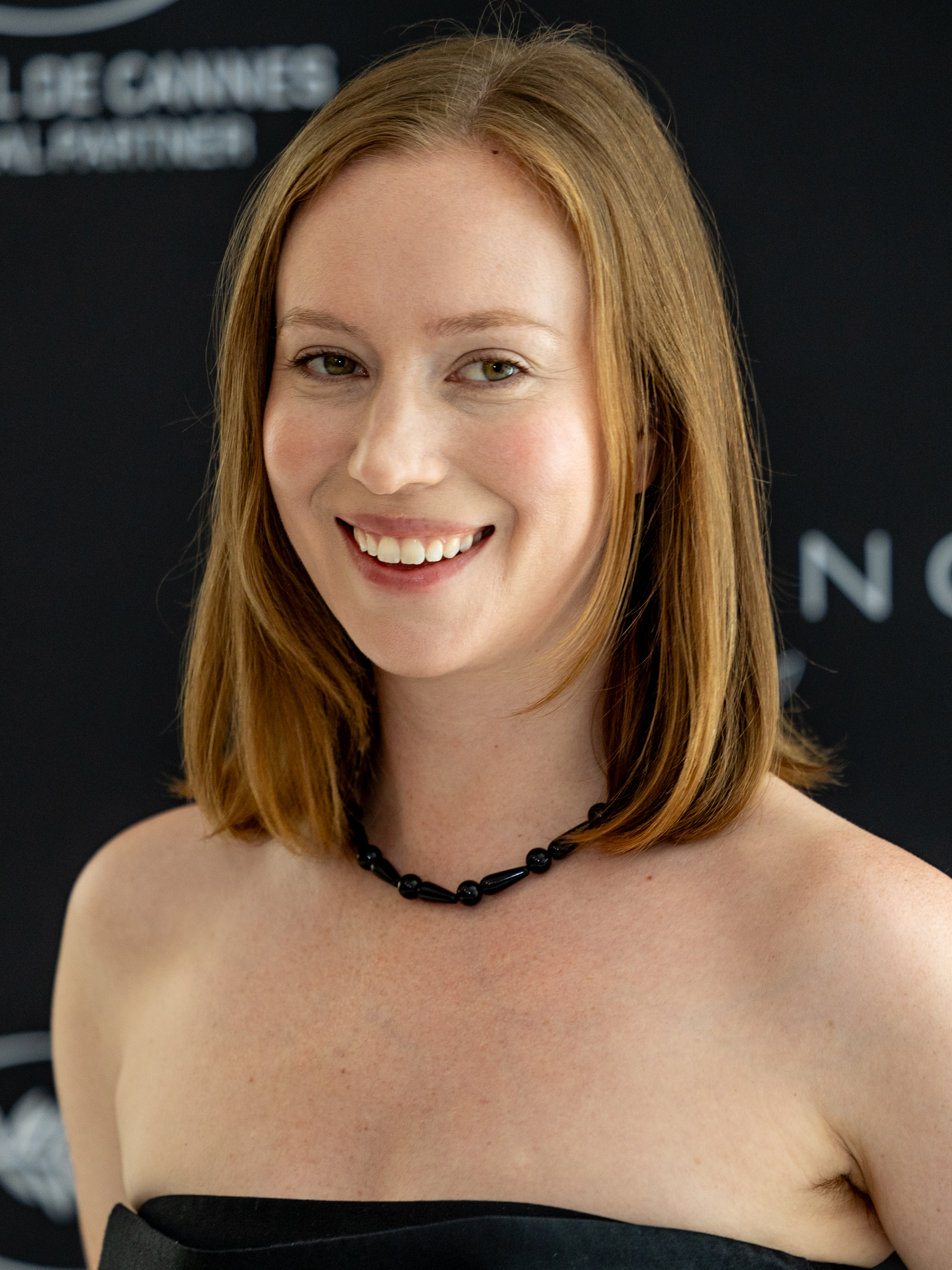
Hannah Einbinder, Best Supporting Actress in a Comedy Series winner

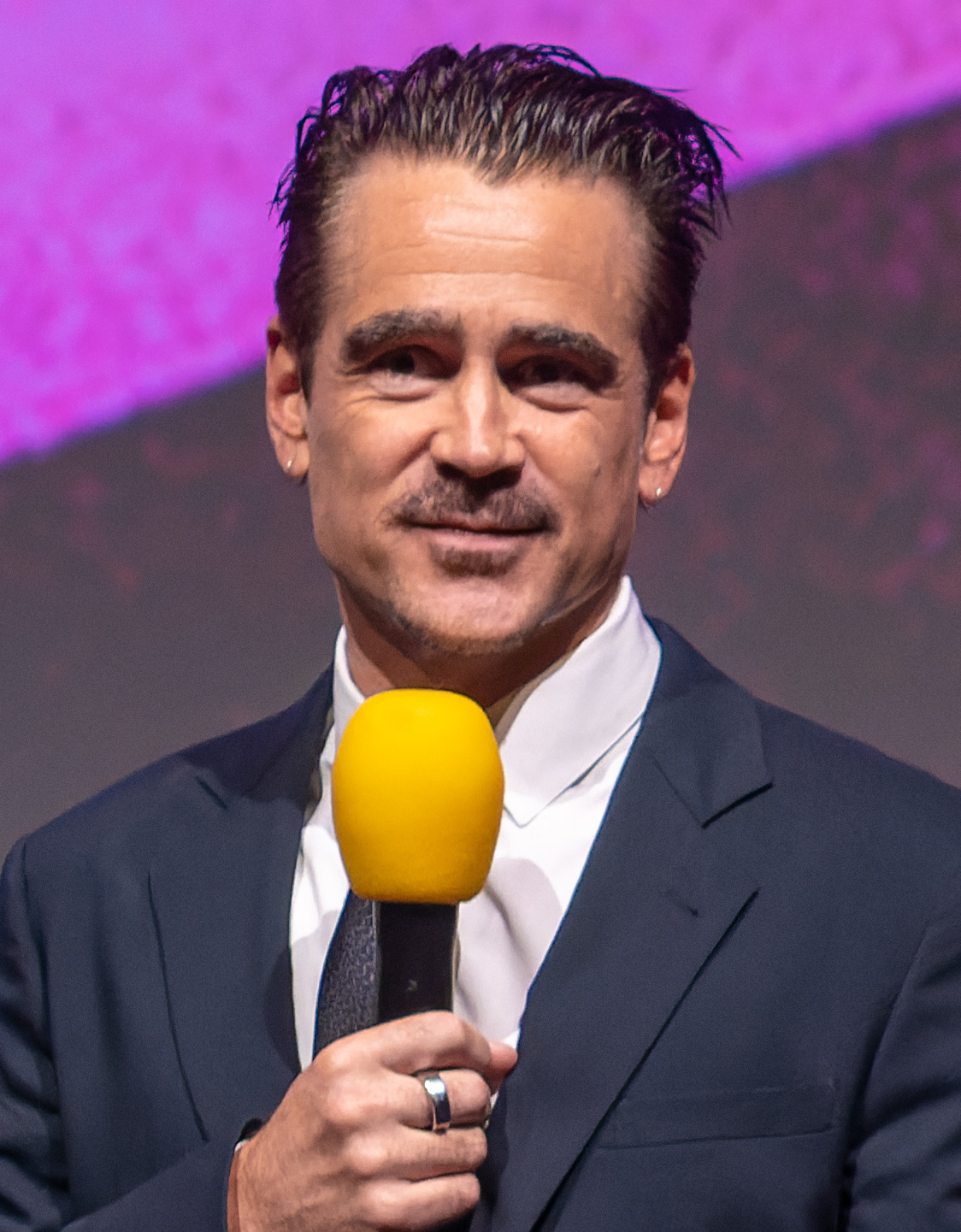
Colin Farrell, Best Actor in a Limited Series or Movie Made for Television winner

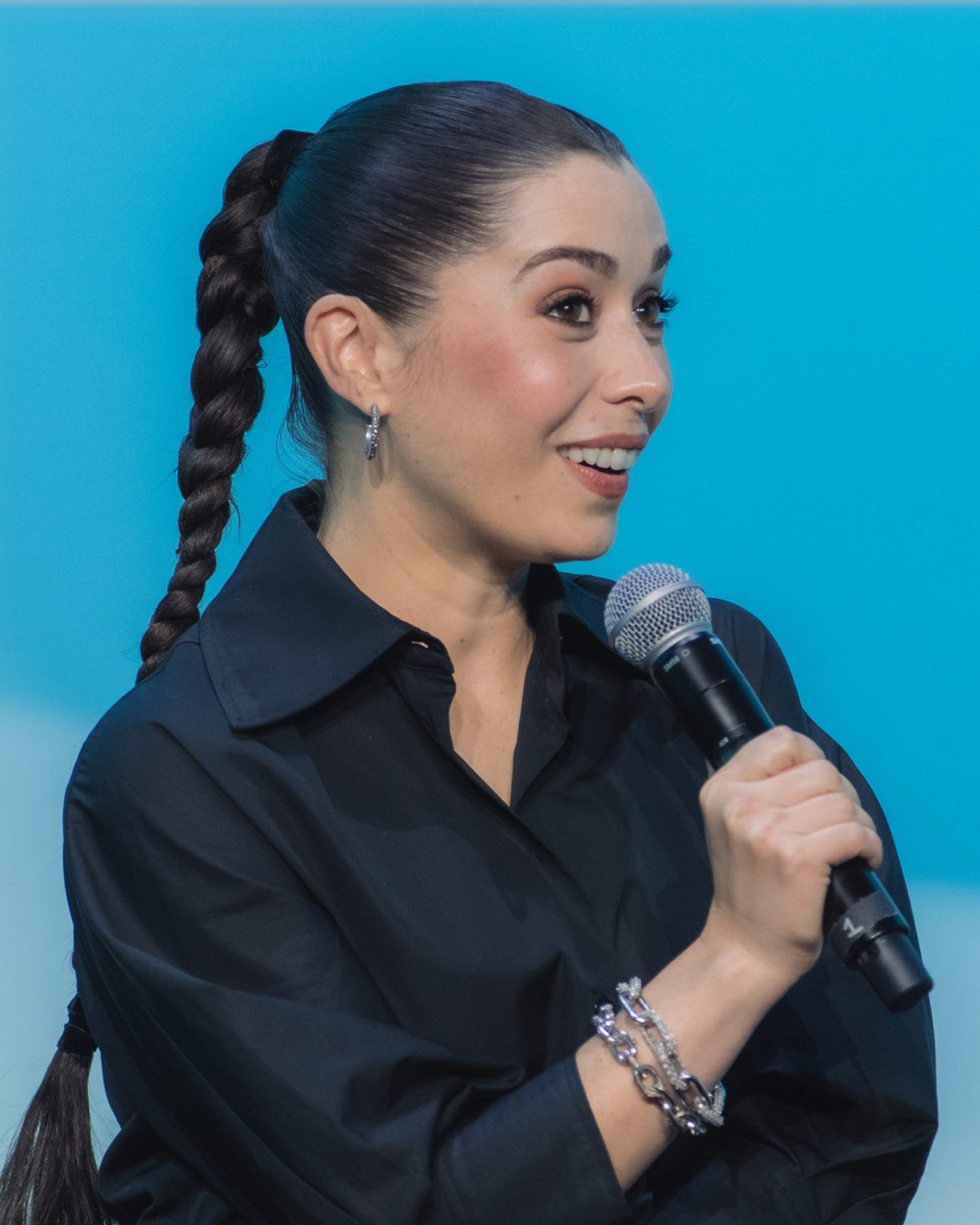
Cristin Milioti, Best Actress in a Limited Series or Movie Made for Television winner

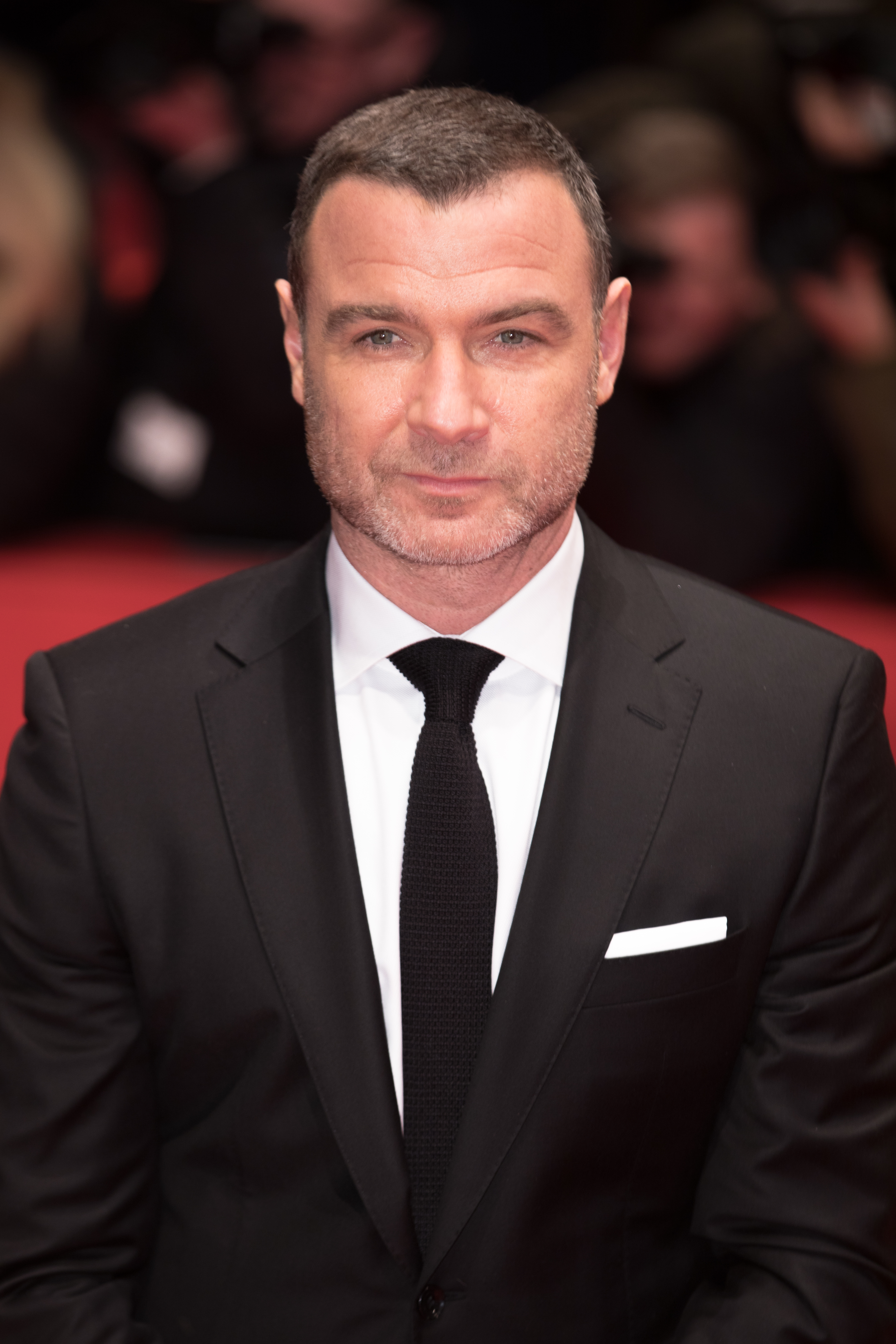
Liev Schreiber, Best Supporting Actor in a Limited Series or Movie Made for Television winner

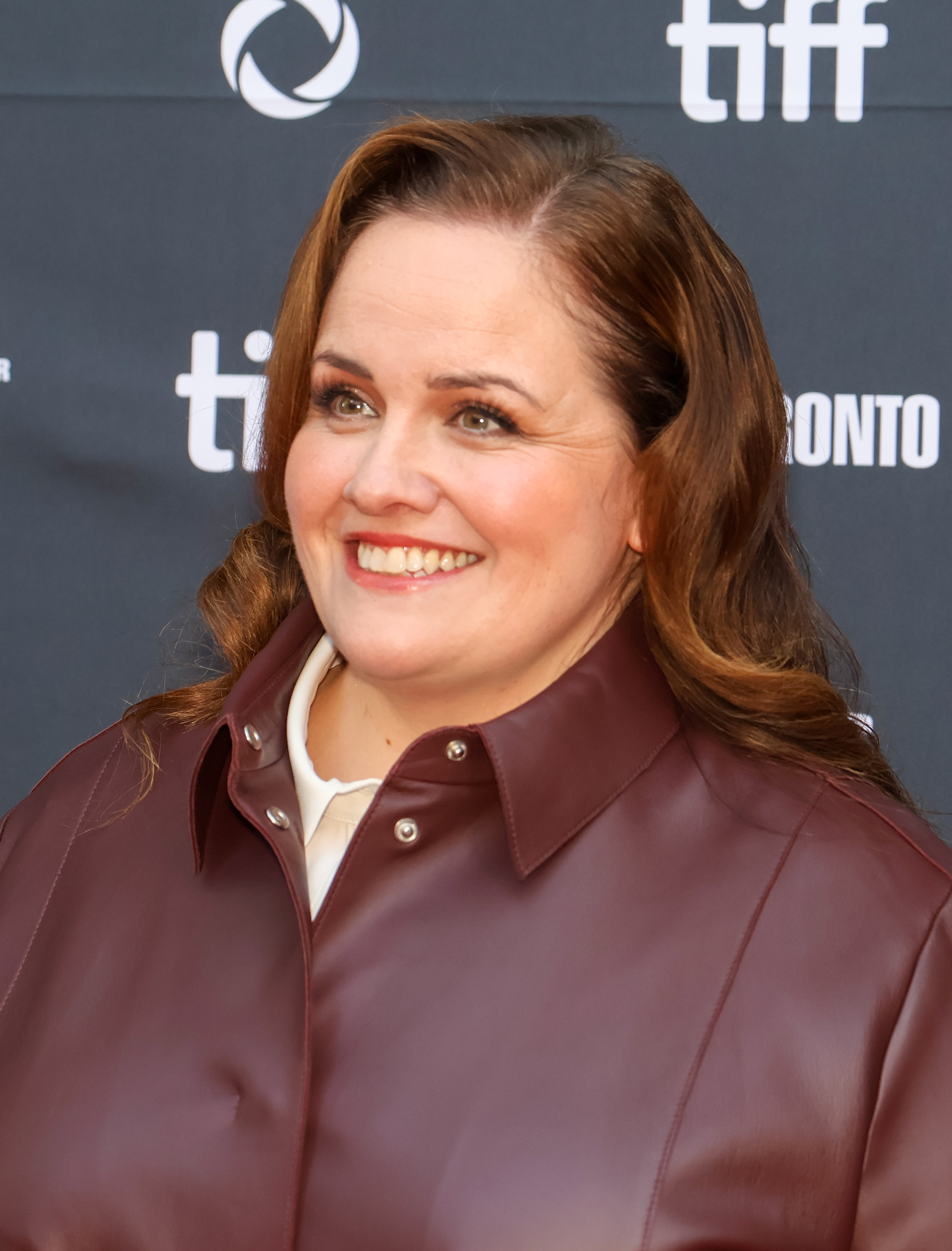
Jessica Gunning, Best Supporting Actress in a Limited Series or Movie Made for Television winner

Best Drama Series: Shōgun (FX / Hulu) (Note: Won Best Action Series, Limited Series or Made-for-TV Movie at the 5th Critics' Choice Super Awards); Anne Rice's Interview with the Vampire (AMC) (Note: Nominated for Best Horror Series, Limited Series or Made-for-TV Movie at the 5th Critics' Choice Super Awards); The Day of the Jackal (Peacock) (Note: Nominated for Best Action Series, Limited Series or Made-for-TV Movie at the 5th Critics' Choice Super Awards); The Diplomat (Netflix); Evil (Paramount+); Industry (HBO / Max); The Old Man (FX); Slow Horses (Apple TV+)
Best Actor in a Drama Series: Hiroyuki Sanada – Shōgun as Lord Yoshii Toranaga (FX / Hulu) (Note: Won Best Actor in an Action Series, Limited Series or Made-for-TV Movie at the 5th Critics' Choice Super Awards); Jeff Bridges – The Old Man as Dan Chase (FX); Ncuti Gatwa – Doctor Who as The Fifteenth Doctor (Disney+) (Note: Nominated for Best Actor in a Science Fiction/Fantasy Series, Limited Series or Made-for-TV Movie at the 5th Critics' Choice Super Awards); Eddie Redmayne – The Day of the Jackal as The Jackal (Peacock) (Note: Nominated for Best Actor in an Action Series, Limited Series or Made-for-TV Movie at the 5th Critics' Choice Super Awards); Rufus Sewell – The Diplomat as Hal Wyler (Netflix); Antony Starr – The Boys as Homelander (Prime Video) (Note: Nominated for Best Actor in a Superhero Series, Limited Series or Made-for-TV Movie at the 5th Critics' Choice Super Awards)	Best Actress in a Drama Series: Kathy Bates – Matlock as Madeline "Matty" Matlock (CBS); Caitríona Balfe – Outlander as Claire Fraser (Starz) (Note: Nominated for Best Actress in a Science Fiction/Fantasy Series, Limited Series or Made-for-TV Movie at the 5th Critics' Choice Super Awards); Shanola Hampton – Found as Gabrielle "Gabi" Mosely (NBC); Keira Knightley – Black Doves as Helen Webb (Netflix) (Note: Nominated for Best Actress in an Action Series, Limited Series or Made-for-TV Movie at the 5th Critics' Choice Super Awards); Keri Russell – The Diplomat as Katherine "Kate" Wyler (Netflix); Anna Sawai – Shōgun as Toda Mariko (FX / Hulu) (Note: Won Best Actress in an Action Series, Limited Series or Made-for-TV Movie at the 5th Critics' Choice Super Awards)
Best Supporting Actor in a Drama Series: Tadanobu Asano – Shōgun as Kashigi Yabushige (FX / Hulu); Michael Emerson – Evil as Leland Townsend (Paramount+) (Note: Nominated for Best Actor in a Horror Series, Limited Series or Made-for-TV Movie at the 5th Critics' Choice Super Awards) (Note: Nominated for Best Villain in a Series, Limited Series or Made-for-TV Movie at the 5th Critics' Choice Super Awards); Mark-Paul Gosselaar – Found as Hugh "Sir" Evans (NBC); Takehiro Hira – Shōgun as Ishido Kazunari (FX / Hulu); John Lithgow – The Old Man as Harold Harper (FX); Sam Reid – Anne Rice's Interview with the Vampire as Lestat de Lioncourt (AMC)	Best Supporting Actress in a Drama Series: Moeka Hoshi – Shōgun as Usami Fuji (FX / Hulu); Allison Janney – The Diplomat as Vice President Grace Penn (Netflix); Nicole Kidman – Lioness as Kaitlyn Meade (Paramount+); Skye P. Marshall – Matlock as Olympia Lawrence (CBS); Anna Sawai – Pachinko as Naomi Ichizaki (Apple TV+); Fiona Shaw – Bad Sisters as Angelica Muldoon (Apple TV+)
Best Comedy Series: Hacks (HBO / Max); Abbott Elementary (ABC); English Teacher (FX); Nobody Wants This (Netflix); Only Murders in the Building (Hulu); Somebody Somewhere (HBO / Max); St. Denis Medical (NBC); What We Do in the Shadows (FX)
Best Actor in a Comedy Series: Adam Brody – Nobody Wants This as Noah Roklov (Netflix); Brian Jordan Alvarez – English Teacher as Evan Marquez (FX); David Alan Grier – St. Denis Medical as Ron (NBC); Steve Martin – Only Murders in the Building as Charles-Haden Savage (Hulu); Kayvan Novak – What We Do in the Shadows as Nandor the Relentless (FX); Martin Short – Only Murders in the Building as Oliver Putnam (Hulu)	Best Actress in a Comedy Series: Jean Smart – Hacks as Deborah Vance (HBO / Max); Kristen Bell – Nobody Wants This as Joanne Williams (Netflix); Quinta Brunson – Abbott Elementary as Janine Teagues (ABC); Natasia Demetriou – What We Do in the Shadows as Nadja (FX) (Note: Nominated for Best Actress in a Horror Series, Limited Series or Made-for-TV Movie at the 5th Critics' Choice Super Awards); Bridget Everett – Somebody Somewhere as Sam (HBO / Max); Kristen Wiig – Palm Royale as Maxine Dellacorte-Simmons (Apple TV+)
Best Supporting Actor in a Comedy Series: Michael Urie – Shrinking as Brian Lorenzo (Apple TV+); Paul W. Downs – Hacks as Jimmy LuSaque Jr. (HBO / Max); Asher Grodman – Ghosts as Trevor Lefkowitz (CBS); Harvey Guillén – What We Do in the Shadows as Guillermo de la Cruz (FX); Brandon Scott Jones – Ghosts as Captain Isaac Higgintoot (CBS); Tyler James Williams – Abbott Elementary as Gregory Eddie (ABC)	Best Supporting Actress in a Comedy Series: Hannah Einbinder – Hacks as Ava Daniels (HBO / Max); Liza Colón-Zayas – The Bear as Tina Marrero (FX / Hulu); Janelle James – Abbott Elementary as Ava Coleman (ABC); Stephanie Koenig – English Teacher as Gwen Sanders (FX); Patti LuPone – Agatha All Along as Lilia Calderu (Disney+); Annie Potts – Young Sheldon as Constance "Connie" Tucker (CBS)
Best Limited Series: Baby Reindeer (Netflix); Disclaimer (Apple TV+); Masters of the Air (Apple TV+); Mr Bates vs The Post Office (PBS); The Penguin (HBO / Max) (Note: Won Best Superhero Series, Limited Series or Made-for-TV Movie at the 5th Critics' Choice Super Awards); Ripley (Netflix); True Detective: Night Country (HBO / Max); We Were the Lucky Ones (Hulu)	Best Movie Made for Television: Rebel Ridge (Netflix) (Note: Nominated for Best Action Movie at the 5th Critics' Choice Super Awards); The Great Lillian Hall (HBO / Max); It's What's Inside (Netflix); Música (Prime Video); Out of My Mind (Disney+); V/H/S/Beyond (Shudder)
Best Actor in a Limited Series or Movie Made for Television: Colin Farrell – The Penguin as Oswald "Oz" Cobb / The Penguin (HBO / Max) (Note: Won Best Actor in a Superhero Series, Limited Series or Made-for-TV Movie at the 5th Critics' Choice Super Awards) (Note: Won Best Villain in a Series, Limited Series or Made-for-TV Movie at the 5th Critics' Choice Super Awards); Richard Gadd – Baby Reindeer as Donny Dunn (Netflix); Tom Hollander – Feud: Capote vs. The Swans as Truman Capote (FX); Kevin Kline – Disclaimer as Stephen Brigstocke (Apple TV+); Ewan McGregor – A Gentleman in Moscow as Count Alexander Ilyich Rostov (Paramount+); Andrew Scott – Ripley as Tom Ripley (Netflix)	Best Actress in a Limited Series or Movie Made for Television: Cristin Milioti – The Penguin as Sofia Falcone (HBO / Max) (Note: Won Best Actress in a Superhero Series, Limited Series or Made-for-TV Movie at the 5th Critics' Choice Super Awards); Cate Blanchett – Disclaimer as Catherine Ravenscroft (Apple TV+); Jodie Foster – True Detective: Night Country as Chief Liz Danvers (HBO / Max) (Note: Won Best Actress in a Horror Series, Limited Series or Made-for-TV Movie at the 5th Critics' Choice Super Awards); Jessica Lange – The Great Lillian Hall as Lillian Hall (HBO / Max); Phoebe-Rae Taylor – Out of My Mind as Melody Brooks (Disney+); Naomi Watts – Feud: Capote vs. The Swans as Babe Paley (FX)
Best Supporting Actor in a Limited Series or Movie Made for Television: Liev Schreiber – The Perfect Couple as Tag Winbury (Netflix); Robert Downey Jr. – The Sympathizer as Claude / Robert Hammer / Ned Godwin / Niko Damianos / The Priest (HBO / Max); Hugh Grant – The Regime as Edward Keplinger (HBO / Max); Ron Cephas Jones – Genius: MLK/X as Elijah Muhammad (National Geographic) (posthumous); Logan Lerman – We Were the Lucky Ones as Addy Kurc (Hulu); Treat Williams – Feud: Capote vs. The Swans as William "Bill" Paley (FX) (posthumous)	Best Supporting Actress in a Limited Series or Movie Made for Television: Jessica Gunning – Baby Reindeer as Martha Scott (Netflix); Dakota Fanning – Ripley as Marjorie "Marge" Sherwood (Netflix); Leila George – Disclaimer as Young Catherine (Apple TV+); Betty Gilpin – Three Women as Lina Parish (Starz); Deirdre O'Connell – The Penguin as Francis Cobb (HBO / Max); Kali Reis – True Detective: Night Country as Detective Evangeline Navarro (HBO / Max)
Best Animated Series: X-Men '97 (Disney+); Batman: Caped Crusader (Prime Video); Bluey (Disney+); Bob's Burgers (Fox); Invincible (Prime Video); The Simpsons (Fox)	Best Foreign Language Series: Squid Game (Netflix) • South Korea; Acapulco (Apple TV+) • United States; Citadel: Honey Bunny (Prime Video) • India; La Máquina (Hulu) • Mexico / United States; The Law According to Lidia Poët (Netflix) • Italy; My Brilliant Friend (HBO / Max) • Italy / United States; Pachinko (Apple TV+) • United States; Senna (Netflix) • Brazil
Best Talk Show: John Mulaney Presents: Everybody's in LA (Netflix); The Daily Show (Comedy Central); The Graham Norton Show (BBC America); Hot Ones (YouTube); The Kelly Clarkson Show (NBC / Syndicated); The Late Show with Stephen Colbert (CBS)	Best Comedy Special: Ali Wong: Single Lady (Netflix); Jim Gaffigan: The Skinny (Hulu); Kevin James: Irregardless (Prime Video); Nikki Glaser: Someday You'll Die (HBO / Max); Rachel Bloom: Death, Let Me Do My Special (Netflix); Ramy Youssef: More Feelings (HBO / Max)

== Multiple nominations ==
=== Films ===
The following twenty films received multiple nominations:

Film	Distributor	Nominations
Conclave	Focus Features	11
Wicked	Universal Pictures	11
Dune: Part Two	Warner Bros. Pictures	10
Emilia Pérez	Netflix	10
The Brutalist	A24	9
Anora	Neon	7
The Substance	MUBI	7
Nickel Boys	Amazon MGM Studios	5
Sing Sing	A24	5
Challengers	Amazon MGM Studios	4
Gladiator II	Paramount Pictures	4
Nosferatu	Focus Features	4
A Complete Unknown	Searchlight Pictures	3
A Real Pain	Searchlight Pictures	3
The Wild Robot	Universal Pictures	3
Flow	Janus Films	2
Maria	Netflix	2
My Old Ass	Amazon MGM Studios	2
Saturday Night	Sony Pictures Releasing	2
September 5	Paramount Pictures	2

=== Television ===
The following twenty-seven series received multiple nominations:

Series	Network(s)	Category	Nominations
Shōgun	FX / Hulu	Drama	6
Abbott Elementary	ABC	Comedy	4
The Diplomat	Netflix	Drama	4
Disclaimer	Apple TV+	Limited	4
Hacks	HBO / Max	Comedy	4
The Penguin	HBO / Max	Limited	4
What We Do in the Shadows	FX	Comedy	4
Baby Reindeer	Netflix	Limited	3
English Teacher	FX	Comedy	3
Feud: Capote vs. The Swans	FX	Limited	3
Nobody Wants This	Netflix	Comedy	3
The Old Man	FX	Drama	3
Only Murders in the Building	Hulu	Comedy	3
Ripley	Netflix	Limited	3
True Detective: Night Country	HBO / Max	Limited	3
Anne Rice's Interview with the Vampire	AMC	Drama	2
The Day of the Jackal	Peacock	Drama	2
Evil	Paramount+	Drama	2
Found	NBC	Drama	2
Ghosts	CBS	Comedy	2
The Great Lillian Hall	HBO / Max	Movie	2
Matlock	CBS	Drama	2
Out of My Mind	Disney+	Movie	2
Pachinko	Apple TV+	Drama	2
Somebody Somewhere	HBO / Max	Comedy	2
St. Denis Medical	NBC	Comedy	2
We Were the Lucky Ones	Hulu	Limited	2

== Multiple wins ==
=== Films ===
The following six films received multiple awards:

Film	Distributor	Wins
Emilia Pérez	Netflix	3
The Substance	MUBI	3
Wicked	Universal Pictures	3
Challengers	Amazon MGM Studios	2
Conclave	Focus Features	2
A Real Pain	Searchlight Pictures	2

=== Television ===
The following four series received multiple awards:

Series	Network(s)	Category	Wins
Shōgun	FX / Hulu	Drama	4
Hacks	HBO / Max	Comedy	3
Baby Reindeer	Netflix	Limited	2
The Penguin	HBO / Max	Limited	2

== Presenters ==
Name(s)	Role
Kate Hudson; Meredith Hagner	Presented the award for Best Ensemble
Allison Tolman; Chase Stokes	Presented the award for Best Supporting Actor and Best Supporting Actress in a Comedy Series
Mark-Paul Gosselaar; Shanola Hampton	Presented the award for Best Supporting Actor and Best Supporting Actress in a Limited Series or Movie Made for Television
Aldis Hodge; Melissa Rauch	Presented the award for Best Supporting Actor and Best Supporting Actress in a Drama Series
Craig Robinson	Presented the award for Best Animated Feature
Rufus Sewell; Keri Russell	Presented the award for Best Actor in a Limited Series
Kathryn Hahn; David Harbour	Presented the award for Best Actress in a Limited Series
Kristen Bell; Justine Lupe	Presented the award for Best Limited Series
Jesse Eisenberg	Presented the award for Best Supporting Actress
Rachel Brosnahan	Presented the award for Best Actor in a Comedy Series
Jimmy O. Yang	Presented the award for Best Actress in a Comedy Series
Randall Park	Presented the award for Best Comedy Series
Lupita Nyong'o	Presented the award for Best Supporting Actor
Sarah Michelle Gellar	Presented the award for Best Actor in a Drama Series
Matt Bomer	Presented the award for Best Actress in a Drama Series
David Alan Grier; Wendi McLendon-Covey	Presented the award for Best Drama Series
Jackie Chan	Presented the award for Best Foreign Language Film
Natasha Lyonne	Presented the award for Best Original Screenplay and Best Adapted Screenplay
Josh Groban	Presented the award for Best Song
Orlando Bloom	Presented the award for Best Director
Ewan McGregor	Presented the award for Best Actress
Michelle Yeoh	Presented the award for Best Actor
Sacha Baron Cohen	Presented the award for Best Picture

== See also ==
- 97th Academy Awards
- 76th Primetime Emmy Awards
- 5th Critics' Choice Super Awards
- 9th Critics' Choice Documentary Awards
