= Marilyne Scarselli =

French hairstylist and make-up artist

- Occupations: Hairstylist, make-up artist

Marilyne Scarselli is a French hairstylist and make-up artist. She won an Academy Award in the category Best Makeup and Hairstyling for the film The Substance.

On January 23, 2025, after the 97th Academy Awards nominees were announced, there was a heated controversy opposing Scarselli in favor of hair designer Frédérique Arguello for the Best Makeup and Hairstyling nomination of the film The Substance.

At the 78th British Academy Film Awards, she won a BAFTA Award for Best Makeup and Hair. Her win was shared with Pierre-Olivier Persin, Stéphanie Guillon and Frédérique Arguello.

== Selected filmography ==
- The Substance (2024)
