= Stéphanie Guillon =

French make-up artist

- Occupation: Make-up artist

Stéphanie Guillon is a French make-up artist. She won an Academy Award in the category Best Makeup and Hairstyling for the film The Substance.

At the 78th British Academy Film Awards, she won a BAFTA Award for Best Makeup and Hair. Her win was shared with Pierre-Olivier Persin, Frédérique Arguello and Marilyne Scarselli.

== Selected filmography ==
- The Substance (2024)
