= Pierre-Olivier Persin =

French make-up artist and production designer

- Occupations: Make-up artist, production designer

Pierre-Olivier Persin is a French make-up artist and production designer. He won an Academy Award in the category Best Makeup and Hairstyling for the film The Substance.

At the 78th British Academy Film Awards, he won a BAFTA Award for Best Makeup and Hair. His win was shared with Stéphanie Guillon, Frédérique Arguello and Marilyne Scarselli.

== Selected filmography ==
- The Substance (2024)
