= Frédérique Arguello =

French-American hair designer

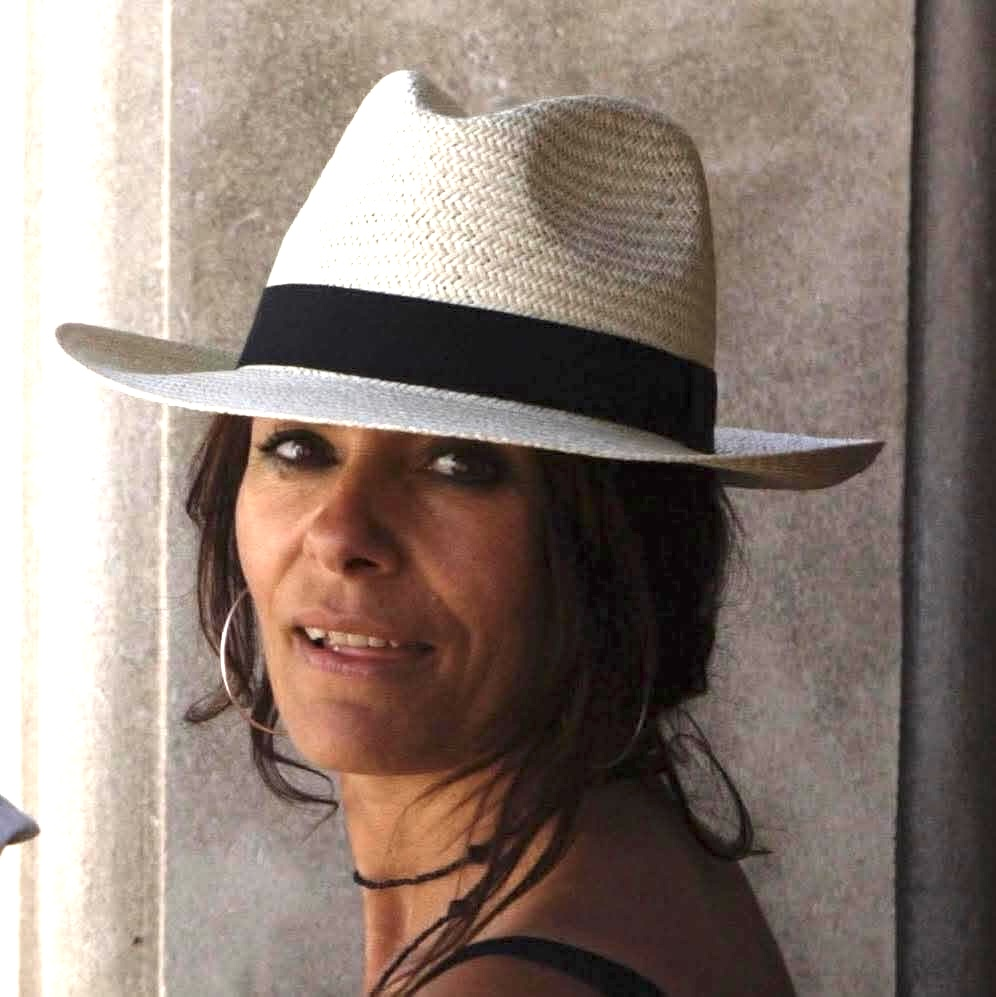
- Born: Montmorency, Val d'Oise, France
- Occupation(s): Hair designer and Head department hair
- Children: 1

Frédérique Arguello is a French-American hair designer and head department hair for film and television. She is best known for winning the BAFTA Award and the Critics Choice Award for Best Make Up & Hair for The Substance (2025).

== Biography ==
Frederique Arguello grew up in Los Angeles during the late 1970s and early 1980's. She is a graduate of the Vidal Sassoon Academy and began her career as Artistic Director at Sebastian International France before transitioning to the film industry. She started her professional hairdressing career between Paris and Hollywood. Over time, she established herself as a department head on numerous high-profile French and international productions.

== Career ==
Known for her artistic and technical expertise, Arguello has collaborated with acclaimed directors and led hairstyling teams on major feature films and television series. Her work is particularly noted for its precision on high-end productions.

== Selected filmography ==
Head Department Hair:

- The Substance – Directed by Coralie Fargeat
- The Gray Man (France) – Directed by Anthony and Joe Russo
- See You Up There (Au Revoir Là-Haut) – Directed by Albert Dupontel
- Taken 2 – Directed by Olivier Megaton
- Mr Bean's Holidays – Directed by Steve Bendelack
- Unleashed – Directed by Louis Leterrier
- Arthur and the Minimoys - Directed by Luc Besson
- Capital - Directed by Costa Gavras
- District 13 - Directed by Pierre Morel
- 9 Month Stretch - Directed by Albert Dupontel
- Hitman - Directed by Xavier Gens
- Our Kind of Traitor (France) - Directed by Susanna White
- Human Zoo - Directed by Rie Rasmussen
- Transporter 3 - Directed by Olivier Megaton
- Lupin (TV series) - Directed by Louis Leterrier
- The Walking Dead: Daryl Dixon (TV series) - Directed by Daniel Percival, Tim Southam
- The Eddy (TV series) - Directed by Damien Chazelle
- The Last Panthers (TV series) - Directed by Johan Renck
- Xanadu -The Money Shot - (TV series)

Assistant Hairstylist:

- Black or White (music video) - Directed by John Landis

== Awards and nominations ==
· Winner – Critics Choice Award for Best Hair and Makeup, shared with Stéphanie Guillon and Pierre‑Olivier Persin, for The Substance (2025)

· Winner – BAFTA Award for Best Make Up & Hair for The Substance (2025)

. Winner - Astra Film and Creative Arts Awards for Best Makeup and Hairstyling for The Substance (2024)

· Nominee – Make‑Up Artists & Hair Stylists Guild Awards (MUAHS): nominated in the category Best Contemporary Hair Styling for The Substance (2025)

== Controversy ==
In 2025, the official Oscar credits for Best Makeup and Hairstyling on the film The Substance were subject to dispute. Frédérique Arguello, who worked as the head of the hair department during the production, was not included among the credited nominees. She later stated that her assistant was credited instead, calling it a symbolic misappropriation of her work and professional recognition.
