= 52nd Saturn Awards =

2025 science fiction/fantasy/horror awards ceremony

- Date: February 2, 2025
- Site: Hilton Universal City, Los Angeles, California
- Hosted by: Joel McHale

Highlights
- Most awards: Film: Dune: Part Two (5); Television: Cobra Kai / Fallout / The Penguin (2)
- Most nominations: Film: Dune: Part Two (14); Television: Fallout / The Walking Dead: The Ones Who Live (5)

Television coverage
- Network: ElectricNOW; The Roku Channel (streaming)

The 52nd Saturn Awards were presented by the Academy of Science Fiction, Fantasy and Horror Films to honor the best in science fiction, fantasy, horror, and other genres belonging to genre fiction in film, television, and home entertainment.

The ceremony was held on February 2, 2025, at Hilton Universal City in Los Angeles, and was live-streamed for the third consecutive year on Electric Entertainment's OTT app, as well as the FAST channel ElectricNow and, for the first time, The Roku Channel. Joel McHale hosted the event for the third year in a row. Additionally, the ceremony was dedicated to film producer Jon Landau, who was a long-time collaborator of filmmaker James Cameron and died in 2024. Due to the Southern California wildfires, the ceremony incorporated fundraising for relief efforts by including QR codes that allowed both in-person attendees and viewers at home to donate.

The nominations were announced on December 5, 2024. The epic space opera Dune: Part Two led the film nominations with fourteen, including Best Science Fiction Film and five acting nominations, followed by Beetlejuice Beetlejuice with thirteen and Deadpool & Wolverine with ten. For the television categories, the Prime Video series Fallout and the AMC miniseries The Walking Dead: The Ones Who Live led the nominations with five each, with the latter winning Best Television Presentation and the former winning Best Science Fiction Television Series. Ultimately, Dune: Part Two won the most film awards with five, including Best Science Fiction Film and Best Film Direction (Denis Villeneuve), followed by Beetlejuice Beetlejuice with four. On the television side, Cobra Kai, Fallout and The Penguin won the most awards with two wins each.

Additionally, Fallout was honored with the Spotlight Award, William Shatner was honored with the Lifetime Achievement Award, and the 1985 film Back to the Future was honored with the George Pal Memorial Award in honor of its 40th anniversary; actors Christopher Lloyd and Lea Thompson, and writer and producer Bob Gale were the film's representatives. Furthermore, Laurence Fishburne was honored with the Lance Reddick Legacy Award, which represents and honors a performer's exceptional talent and character, recognizing an individual who serves as an exemplary goodwill ambassador within their industry, while Hiroyuki Sanada was honored with the Robert Forster Artist's Award, which honors an actor for their body of work and impact on the industry in memory of actor Robert Forster. Additionally, Superman & Lois was honored with the Dan Curtis Legacy Award in recognition of its outstanding contribution to the genre of superhero storytelling.

This year's eligibility period for nominations extended from October 2023 to October 31, 2024.

== Category changes ==
Introduced

- Best Action / Adventure / Thriller Television Series split into:
  - Best Action / Thriller Television Series
  - Best Adventure Television Series

Renamed

- Best New Genre Television Series → Best Genre Comedy Television Series

Discontinued

- Best Superhero Film

== Winners and nominees ==
=== Film ===
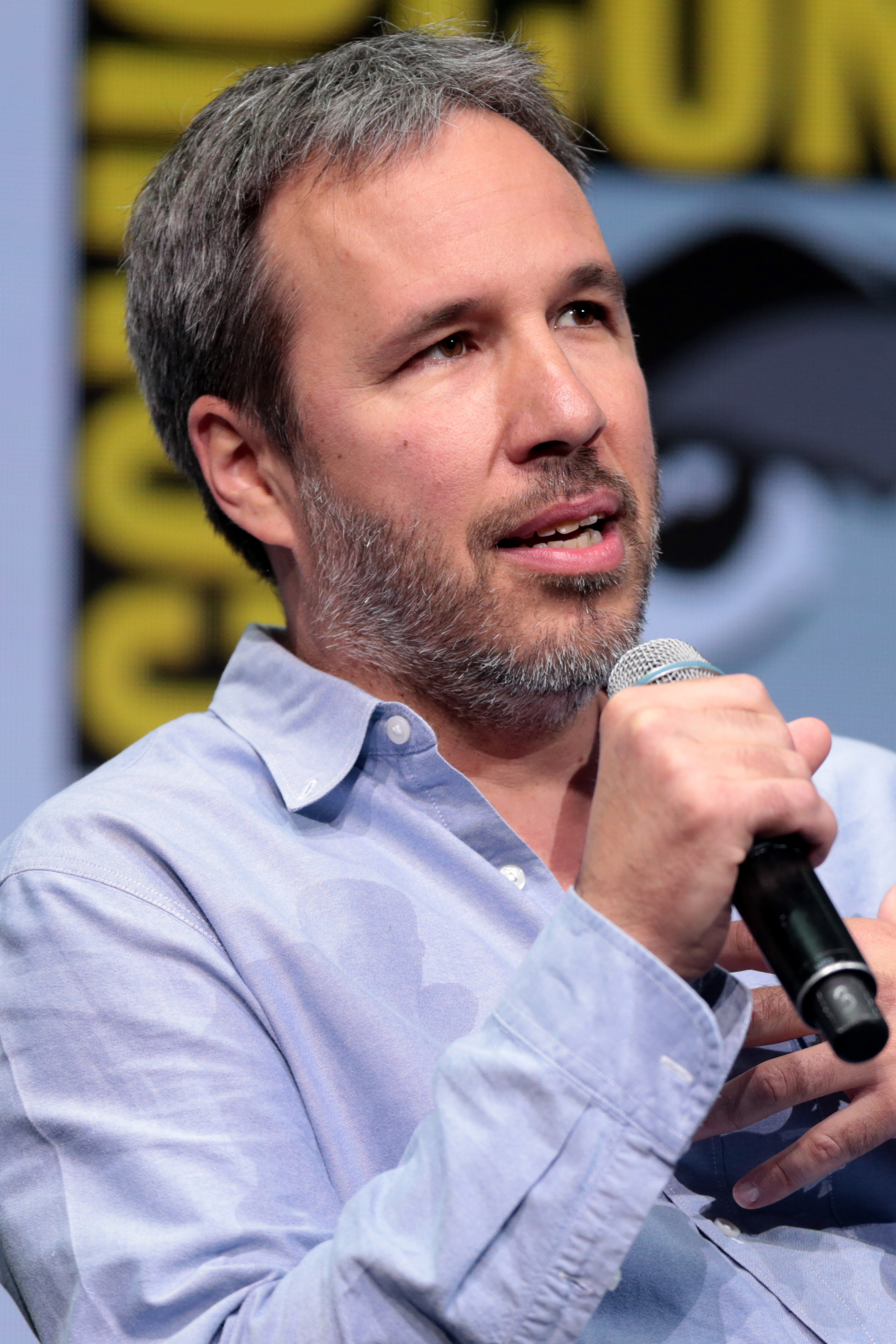
Denis Villeneuve, Best Film Direction winner

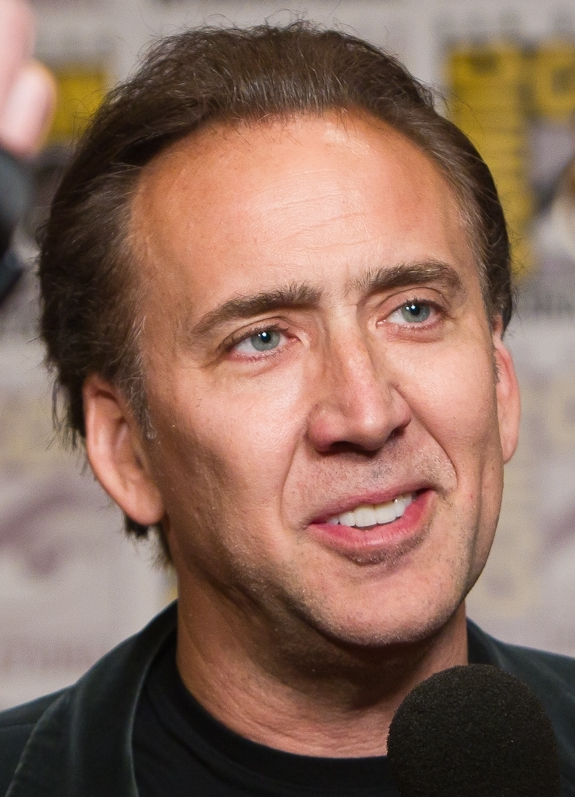
Nicolas Cage, Best Actor in a Film winner

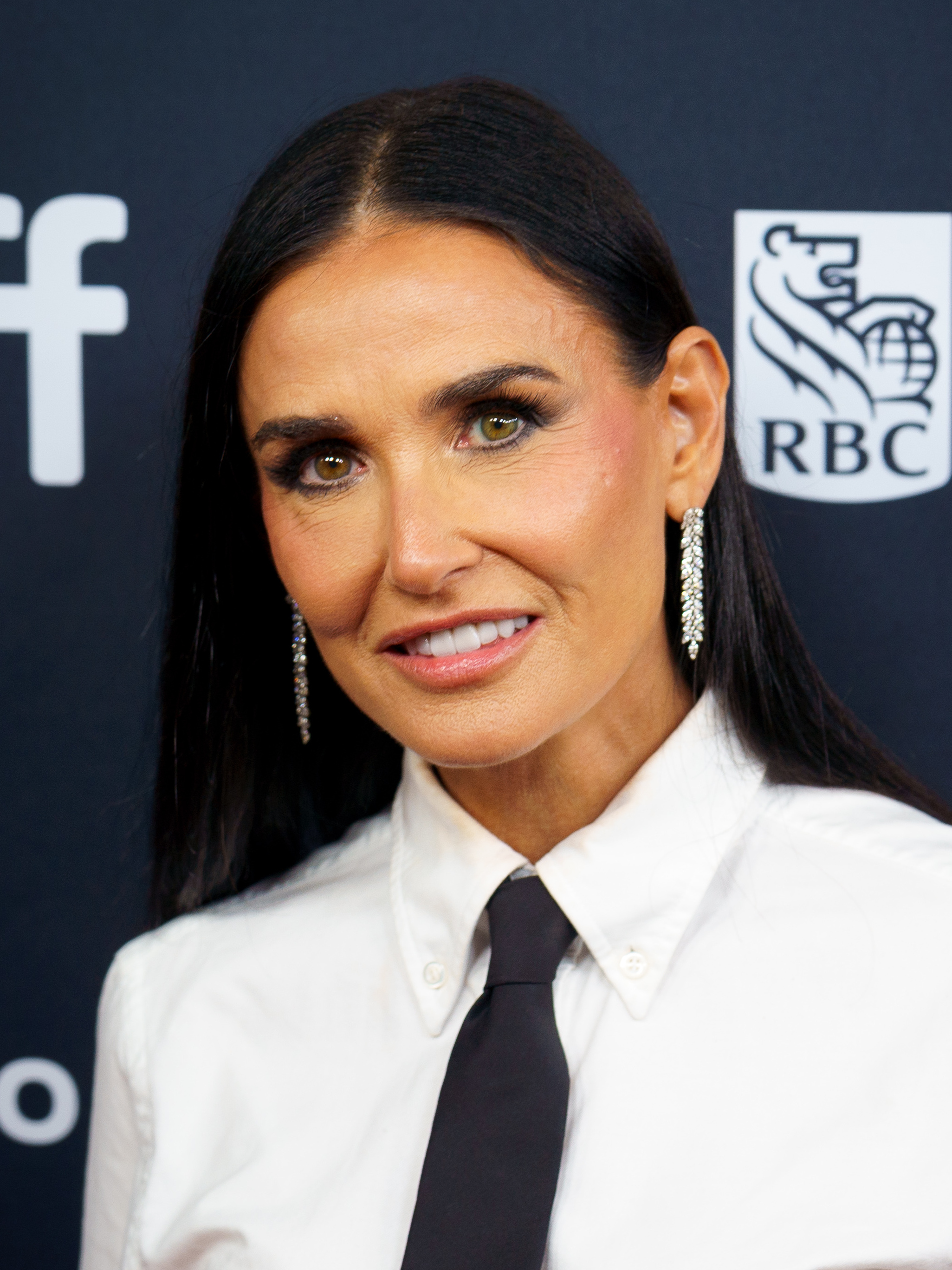
Demi Moore, Best Actress in a Film winner

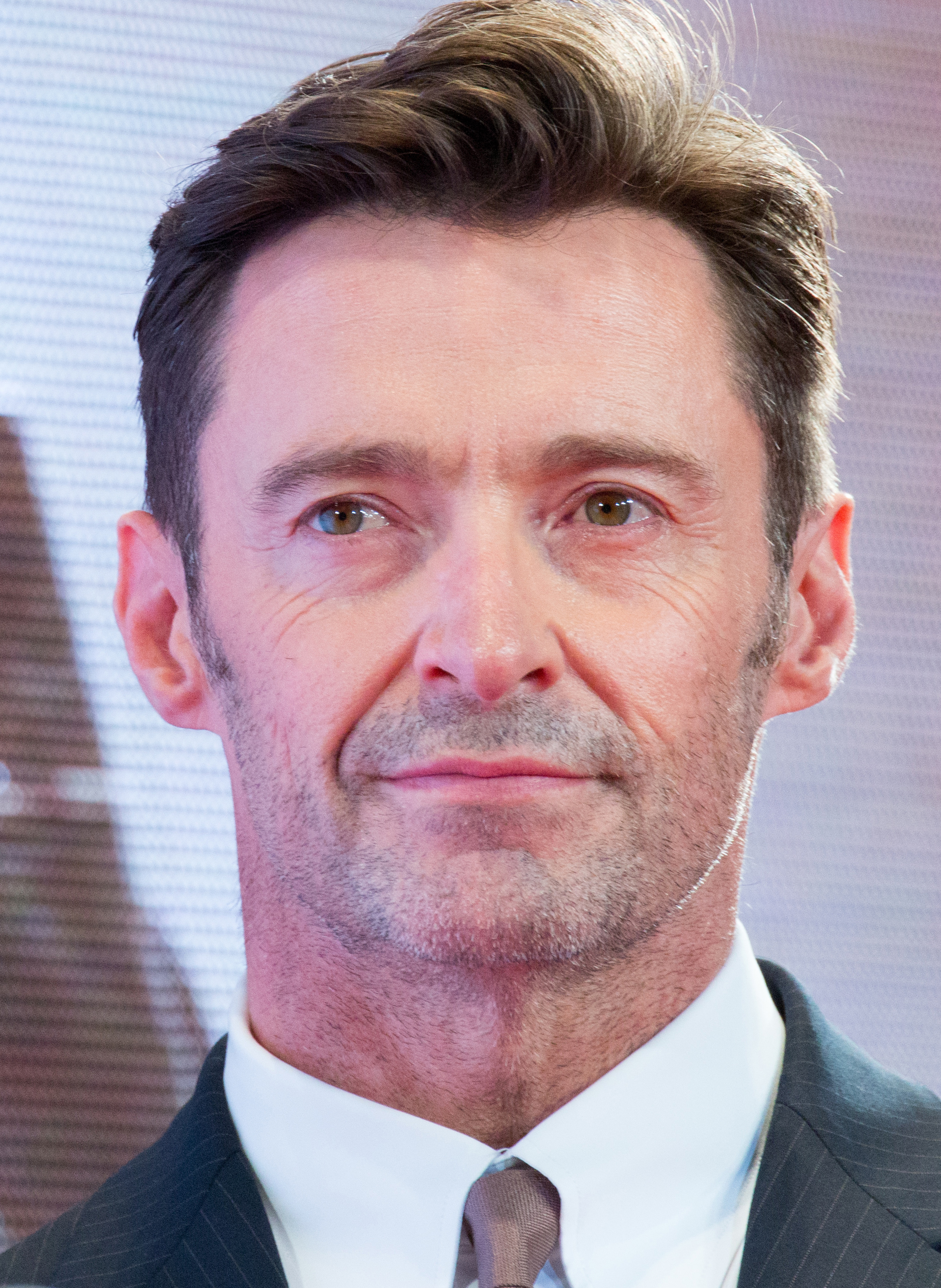
Hugh Jackman, Best Supporting Actor in a Film winner

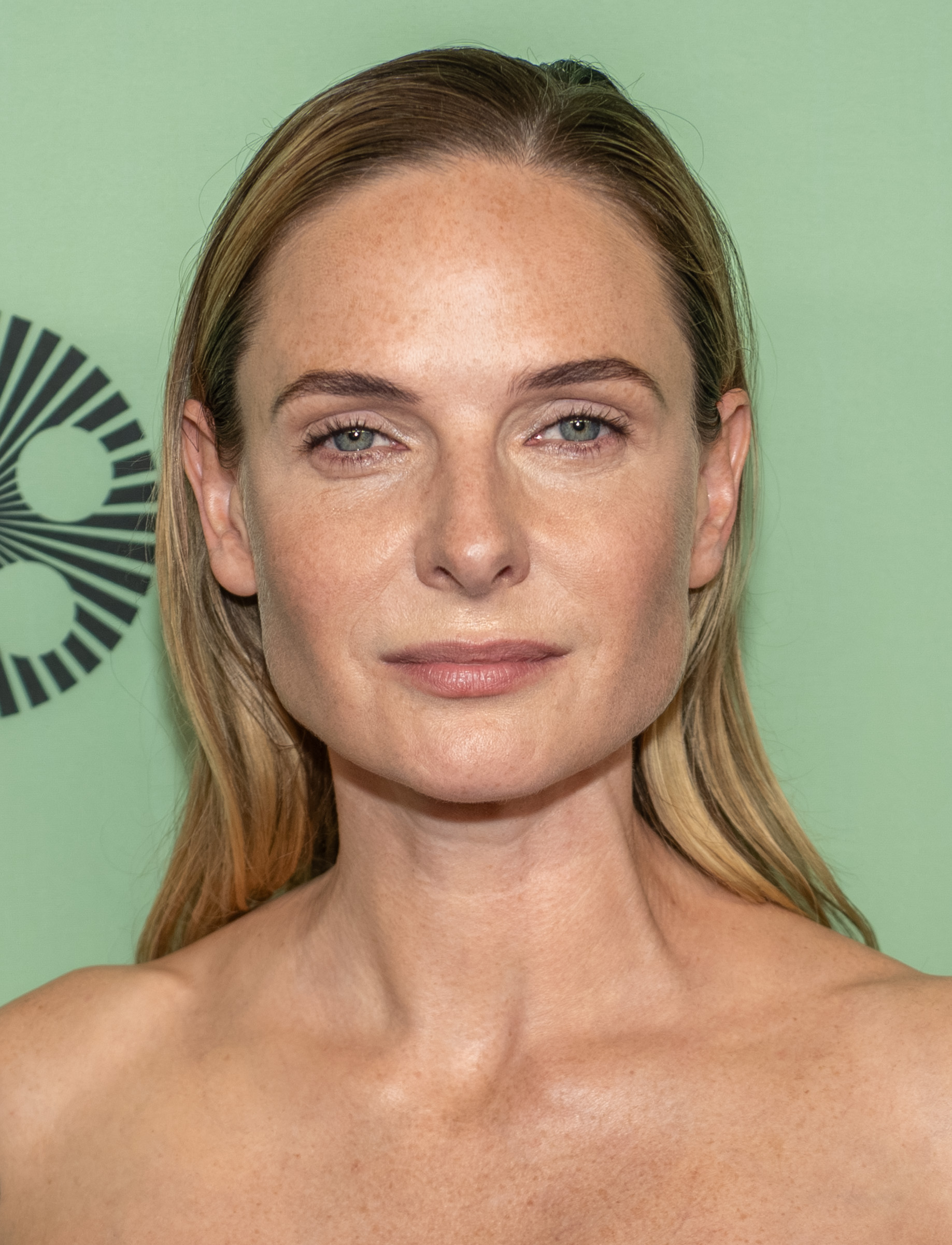
Rebecca Ferguson, Best Supporting Actress in a Film winner

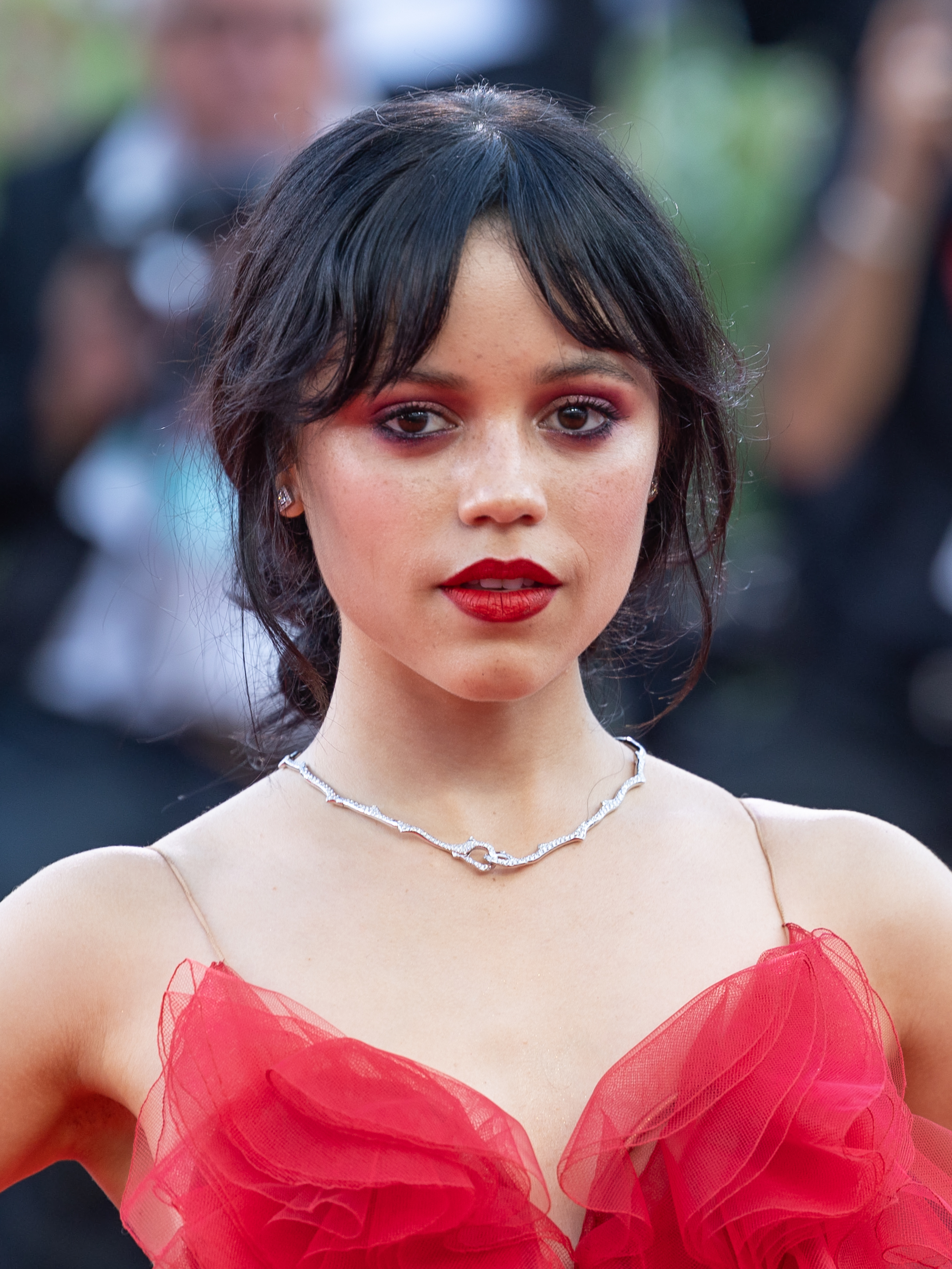
Jenna Ortega, Best Younger Performer in a Film winner

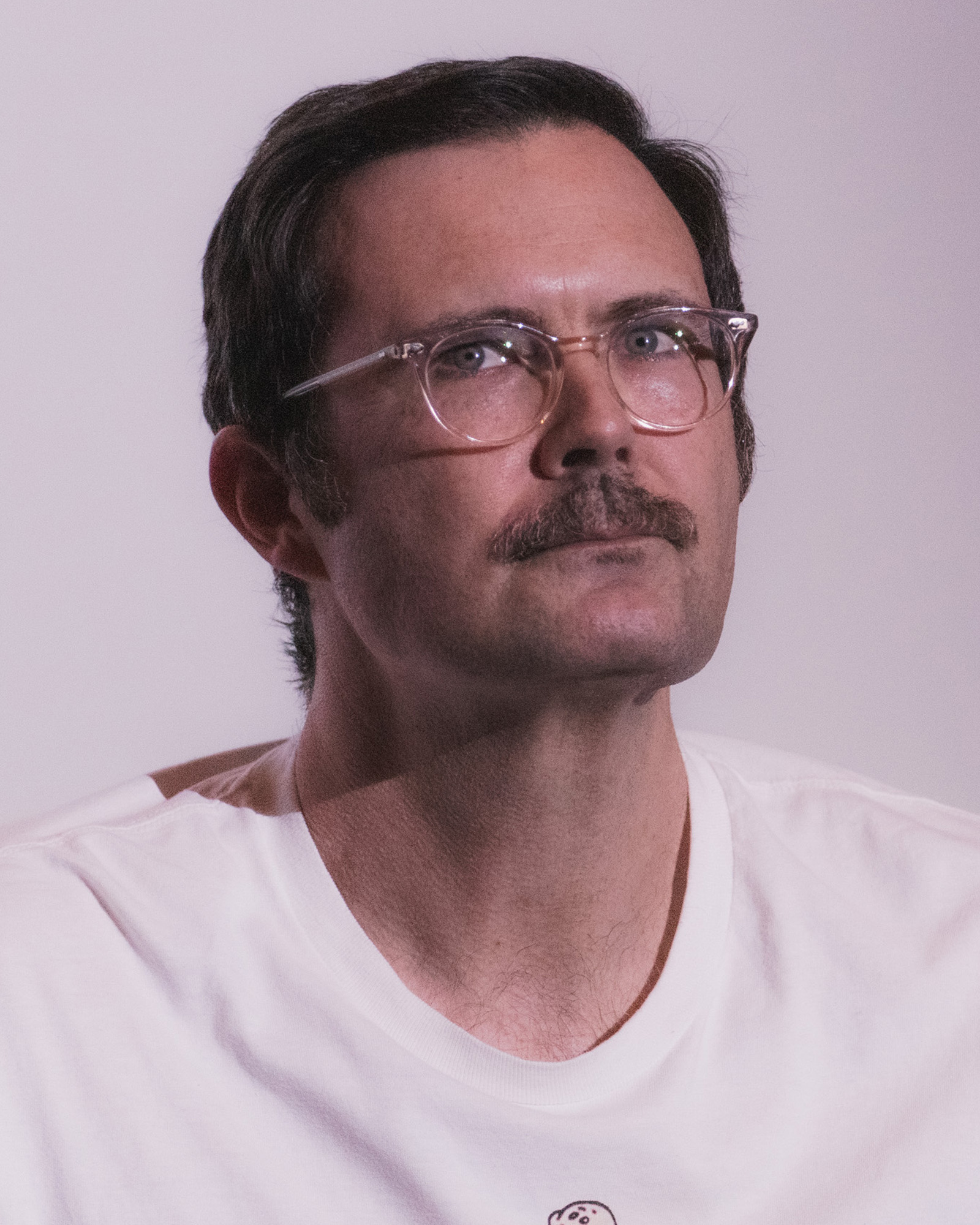
Osgood Perkins, Best Film Screenwriting winner

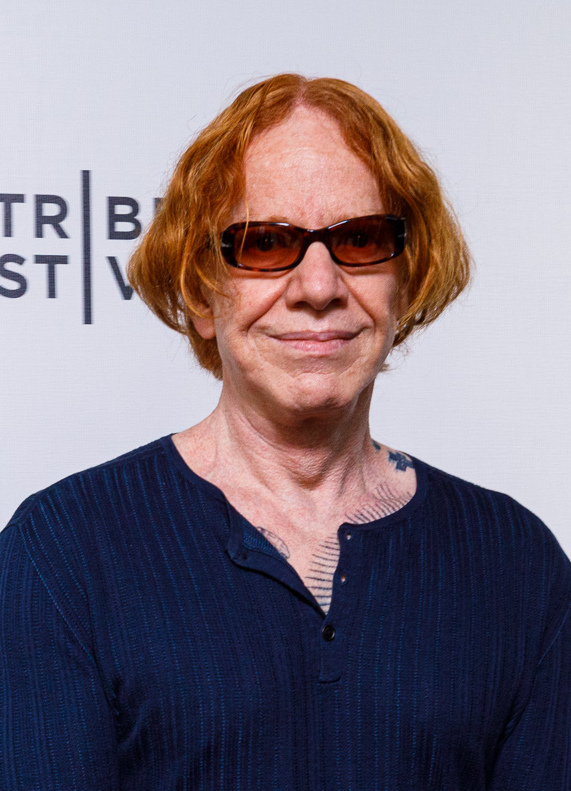
Danny Elfman, Best Film Music winner

Best Science Fiction Film	Best Fantasy Film
Dune: Part Two; Furiosa: A Mad Max Saga; The Hunger Games: The Ballad of Songbirds & Snakes; Kingdom of the Planet of the Apes; Megalopolis; Venom: The Last Dance	Beetlejuice Beetlejuice; Ghostbusters: Frozen Empire; Godzilla x Kong: The New Empire; My Old Ass; Poor Things; Wonka
Best Horror Film	Best Action / Adventure Film
Alien: Romulus; Abigail; The First Omen; In a Violent Nature; Longlegs; A Quiet Place: Day One; Smile 2	Deadpool & Wolverine; Argylle; The Fall Guy; Fly Me to the Moon; The Ministry of Ungentlemanly Warfare; Twisters
Best Thriller Film	Best Animated Film
Strange Darling; Blink Twice; Civil War; Saltburn; Speak No Evil; Wolfs	The Wild Robot; The Boy and the Heron; Despicable Me 4; Inside Out 2; Kung Fu Panda 4; Spy × Family Code: White; Transformers One
Best Independent Film	Best International Film
Late Night with the Devil; Dream Scenario; MaXXXine; The Substance; Thelma; The Thicket	Godzilla Minus One (Japan); The Animal Kingdom (France); Kill (India); Monkey Man (Canada / United States); Oddity (Ireland); Society of the Snow (Spain)
Best Film Direction	Best Film Screenwriting
Denis Villeneuve – Dune: Part Two; Fede Álvarez – Alien: Romulus; Wes Ball – Kingdom of the Planet of the Apes; Tim Burton – Beetlejuice Beetlejuice; Shawn Levy – Deadpool & Wolverine; JT Mollner – Strange Darling; Takashi Yamazaki – Godzilla Minus One	Osgood Perkins – Longlegs; Josh Friedman – Kingdom of the Planet of the Apes; Alfred Gough and Miles Millar – Beetlejuice Beetlejuice; JT Mollner – Strange Darling; Ryan Reynolds, Rhett Reese, Paul Wernick, Zeb Wells, and Shawn Levy – Deadpool & Wolverine; Denis Villeneuve and Jon Spaihts – Dune: Part Two; Takashi Yamazaki – Godzilla Minus One
Best Actor in a Film	Best Actress in a Film
Nicolas Cage – Dream Scenario as Paul Matthews; Tom Blyth – The Hunger Games: The Ballad of Songbirds & Snakes as Coriolanus Snow; Timothée Chalamet – Dune: Part Two as Paul Atreides; David Dastmalchian – Late Night with the Devil as Jack Delroy; Kyle Gallner – Strange Darling as The Demon; Michael Keaton – Beetlejuice Beetlejuice as Betelgeuse; Ryan Reynolds – Deadpool & Wolverine as Wade Wilson / Deadpool	Demi Moore – The Substance as Elisabeth Sparkle; Willa Fitzgerald – Strange Darling as The Lady; Lupita Nyong'o – A Quiet Place: Day One as Samira; Winona Ryder – Beetlejuice Beetlejuice as Lydia Deetz; Naomi Scott – Smile 2 as Skye Riley; June Squibb – Thelma as Thelma Post; Anya Taylor-Joy – Furiosa: A Mad Max Saga as Imperator Furiosa
Best Supporting Actor in a Film	Best Supporting Actress in a Film
Hugh Jackman – Deadpool & Wolverine as Logan / Wolverine; Josh Brolin – Dune: Part Two as Gurney Halleck; Austin Butler – Dune: Part Two as Feyd-Rautha Harkonnen; Nicolas Cage – Longlegs as Dale Ferdinand Kobble / Longlegs; Willem Dafoe – Beetlejuice Beetlejuice as Wolf Jackson; David Jonsson – Alien: Romulus as Andy Carradine; Owen Teague – Kingdom of the Planet of the Apes as Noa	Rebecca Ferguson – Dune: Part Two as Lady Jessica; Emma Corrin – Deadpool & Wolverine as Cassandra Nova; Barbara Hershey – Strange Darling as Genevieve; Juliette Lewis – The Thicket as Cut Throat Bill; Margaret Qualley – The Substance as Sue; Cailee Spaeny – Alien: Romulus as Rain Carradine; Zendaya – Dune: Part Two as Chani
Best Younger Performer in a Film	Best Film Editing
Jenna Ortega – Beetlejuice Beetlejuice as Astrid Deetz; Freya Allan – Kingdom of the Planet of the Apes as Mae; Mckenna Grace – Ghostbusters: Frozen Empire as Phoebe Spengler; Kaylee Hottle – Godzilla x Kong: The New Empire as Jia; Calah Lane – Wonka as Noodle; Alisha Weir – Abigail as Abigail; Rachel Zegler – The Hunger Games: The Ballad of Songbirds & Snakes as Lucy Gray Baird	Deadpool & Wolverine – Dean Zimmerman and Shane Reid; Beetlejuice Beetlejuice – Jay Prychidny; Civil War – Jake Roberts; Dune: Part Two – Joe Walker; Furiosa: A Mad Max Saga – Eliot Knapman and Margaret Sixel; Strange Darling – Christopher Robin Bell
Best Film Music	Best Film Production Design
Beetlejuice Beetlejuice – Danny Elfman; Dune: Part Two – Hans Zimmer; Ghostbusters: Frozen Empire – Dario Marianelli; The Hunger Games: The Ballad of Songbirds & Snakes – James Newton Howard; Kingdom of the Planet of the Apes – John Paesano; Smile 2 – Cristobal Tapia de Veer	Dune: Part Two – Patrice Vermette; Alien: Romulus – Naaman Marshall; Beetlejuice Beetlejuice – Mark Scruton; Deadpool & Wolverine – Ray Chan; Kingdom of the Planet of the Apes – Daniel T. Dorrance; Longlegs – Danny Vermette
Best Film Costume Design	Best Film Make Up
Beetlejuice Beetlejuice – Colleen Atwood; Deadpool & Wolverine – Graham Churchyard and Mayes C. Rubeo; Dune: Part Two – Jacqueline West; Ghostbusters: Frozen Empire – Alexis Forte and Ruth Myers; The Hunger Games: The Ballad of Songbirds & Snakes – Trish Summerville; Wonka – Lindy Hemming	The Substance – Pierre-Olivier Persin; Alien: Romulus – Pam Smyth; Beetlejuice Beetlejuice – Neal Scanlan, Christine Blundell, and Lesa Warrener; Dune: Part Two – Donald Mowat, Love Larson, and Eva von Bahr; Longlegs – Werner Pretorius, Felix Fox, and Madelaine Hermans; Smile 2 – Jeremy Selenfriend, Sasha Grossman, and Alec Gillis
Best Film Visual / Special Effects
Dune: Part Two – Paul Lambert, Stephen James, Rhys Salcombe, and Gerd Nefzer; Alien: Romulus – Alec Gillis, Eric Barba, Nelson Sepulveda-Fauser, Daniel Macarin, and Shane Mahan; Beetlejuice Beetlejuice – Angus Bickerton, James Brennan-Craddock, Neal Scanlan, and Stefano Pepin; Deadpool & Wolverine – Swen Gillberg, Matthew Twyford, Vincent Papaix, and Dominic Tuohy; Godzilla Minus One – Masaki Takahashi, Tatsuji Nojima, Kiyoko Shibuya, and Takashi Yamazaki; Kingdom of the Planet of the Apes – Erik Winquist, Stephen Unterfranz, Paul Story, and Rodney Burke; Twisters – Ben Snow, Florian Witzel, Charles Lai, Scott R. Fisher, Dave Crispino, and Bill Georgiou

=== Television ===
==== Programs ====
Best Science Fiction Television Series	Best Fantasy Television Series
Fallout (Prime Video); 3 Body Problem (Netflix); Ahsoka (Disney+); The Ark (Syfy); Dark Matter (Apple TV+); Star Trek: Discovery (Paramount+)	House of the Dragon (Max); Avatar: The Last Airbender (Netflix); For All Mankind (Apple TV+); The Lord of the Rings: The Rings of Power (Prime Video); Percy Jackson and the Olympians (Disney+); The Spiderwick Chronicles (The Roku Channel)
Best Horror Television Series	Best Action / Thriller Television Series
From (MGM+); Anne Rice's Interview with the Vampire (AMC); Creepshow (Shudder); Evil (Paramount+); Grotesquerie (FX); Teacup (Peacock); The Walking Dead: Daryl Dixon (AMC)	Cobra Kai (Netflix); Bosch: Legacy (Amazon Freevee); Found (NBC); High Potential (ABC); Presumed Innocent (Apple TV+); True Detective: Night Country (Max); Tulsa King (Paramount+)
Best Adventure Television Series	Best Animated Television Series or Special
Monarch: Legacy of Monsters (Apple TV+); La Brea (NBC); Mr. & Mrs. Smith (Prime Video); Reacher (Prime Video); Shōgun (FX); Sugar (Apple TV+)	Star Wars: The Bad Batch (Disney+); Batman: Caped Crusader (Prime Video); Gremlins: The Wild Batch (Max); Kaiju No. 8 (Crunchyroll); Star Trek: Lower Decks (Paramount+); X-Men '97 (Disney+)
Best Superhero Television Series	Best Television Presentation
Agatha All Along (Disney+); The Boys (Prime Video); Loki (Disney+); The Penguin (Max); Superman & Lois (The CW); The Umbrella Academy (Netflix)	The Walking Dead: The Ones Who Live (AMC); Apartment 7A (Paramount+); Don't Move (Netflix); The Fall of the House of Usher (Netflix); Fargo (FX); Ripley (Netflix); 'Salem's Lot (Max)
Best Genre Comedy Television Series
Ghosts (CBS); Chucky (Syfy); Only Murders in the Building (Hulu); Resident Alien (Syfy); Ted (Peacock); What We Do in the Shadows (FX)

==== Acting ====
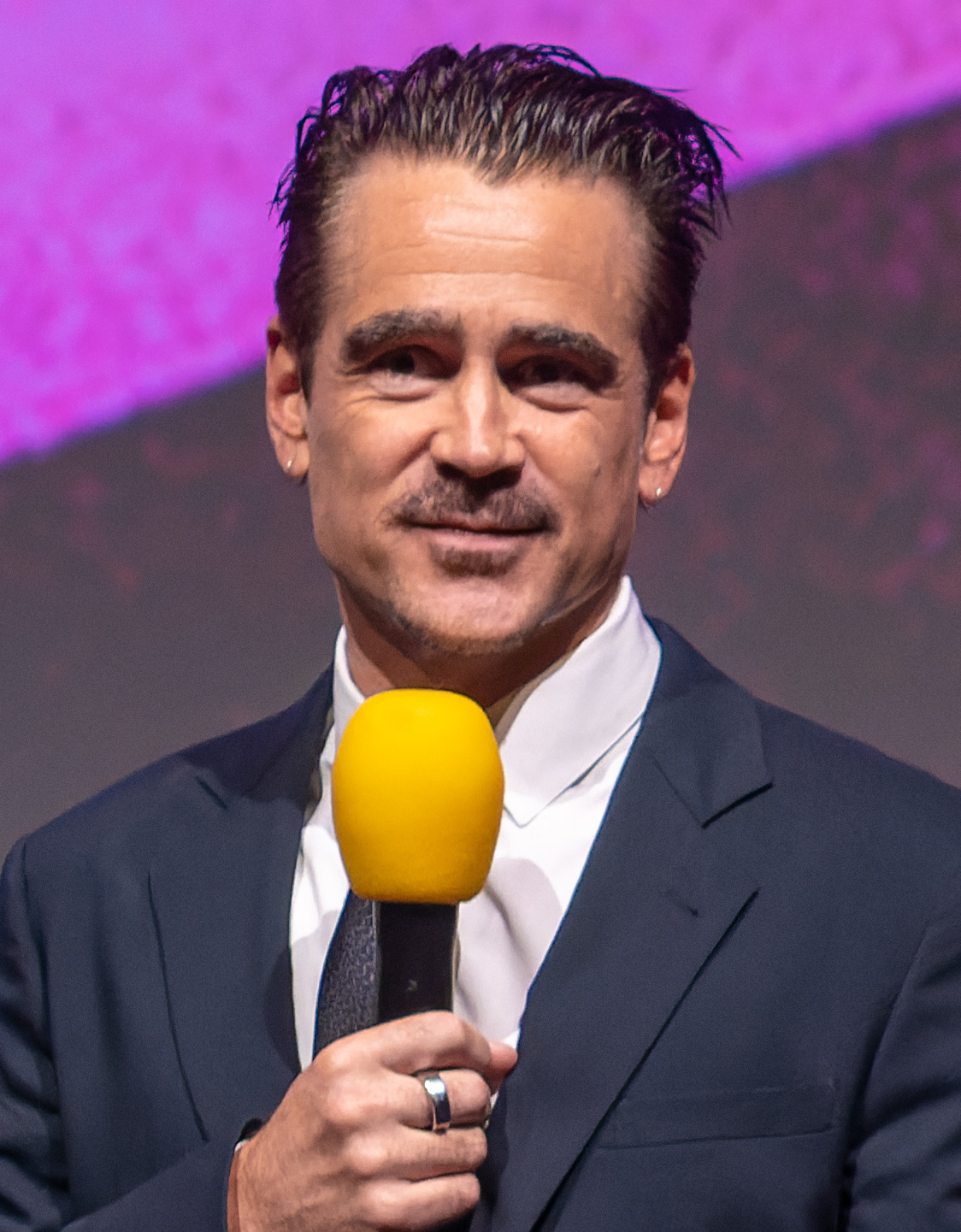
Colin Farrell, Best Actor in a Television Series winner

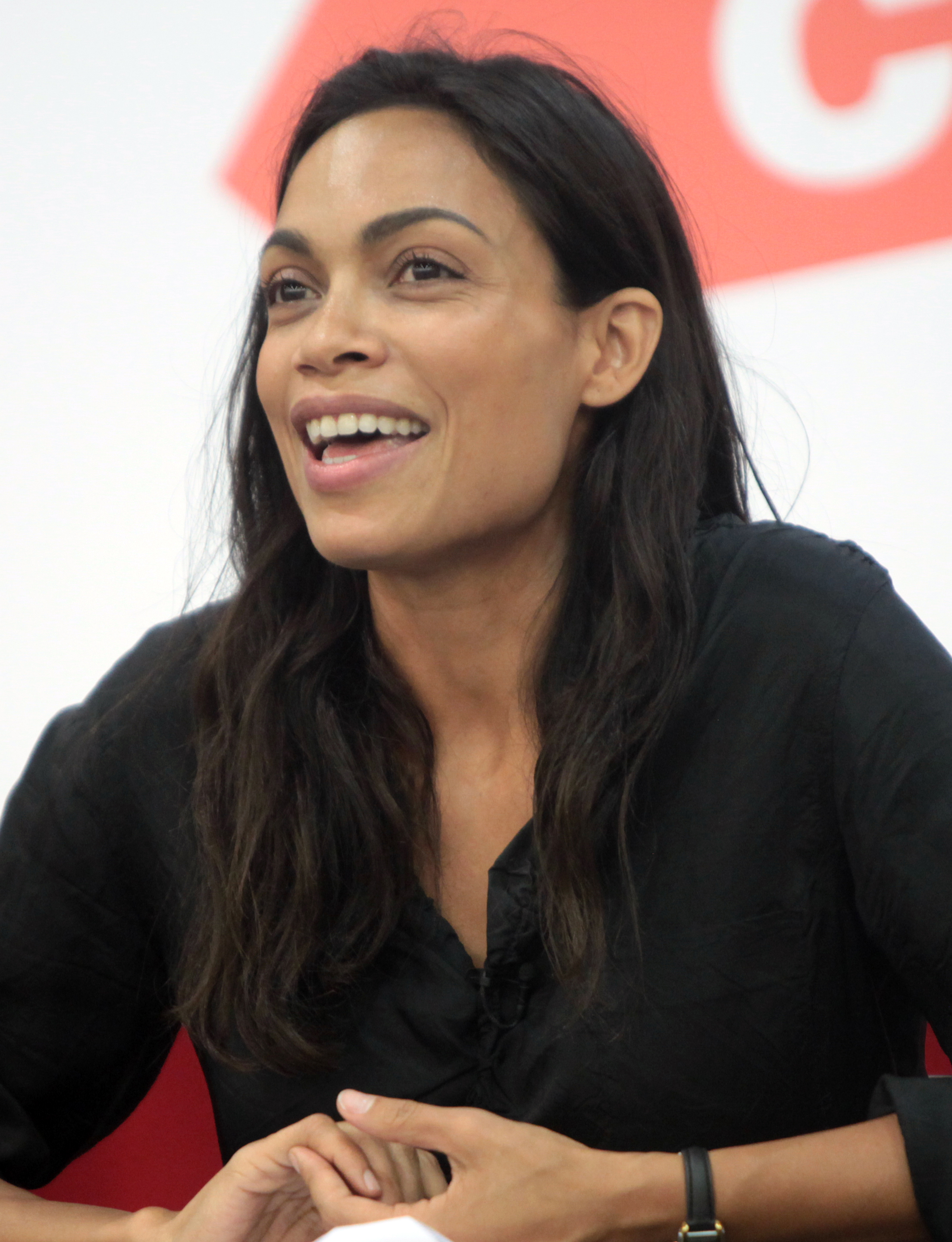
Rosario Dawson, Best Actress in a Television Series winner

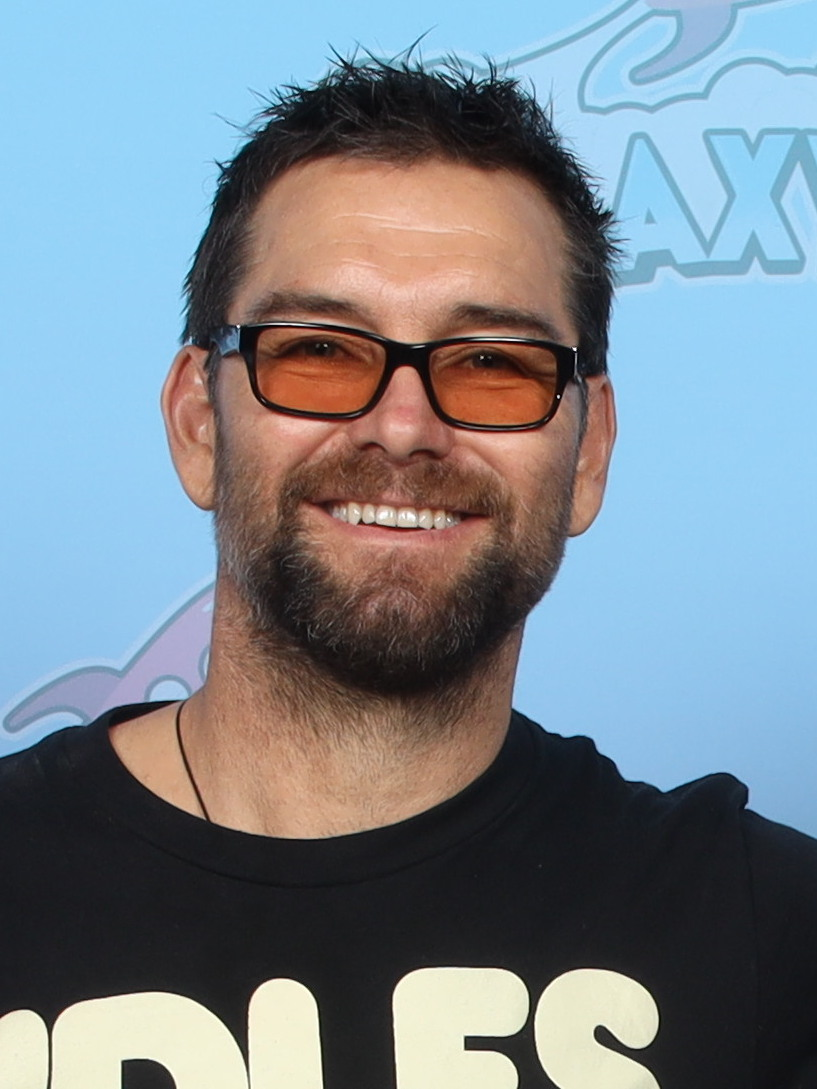
Antony Starr, Best Supporting Actor in a Television Series winner

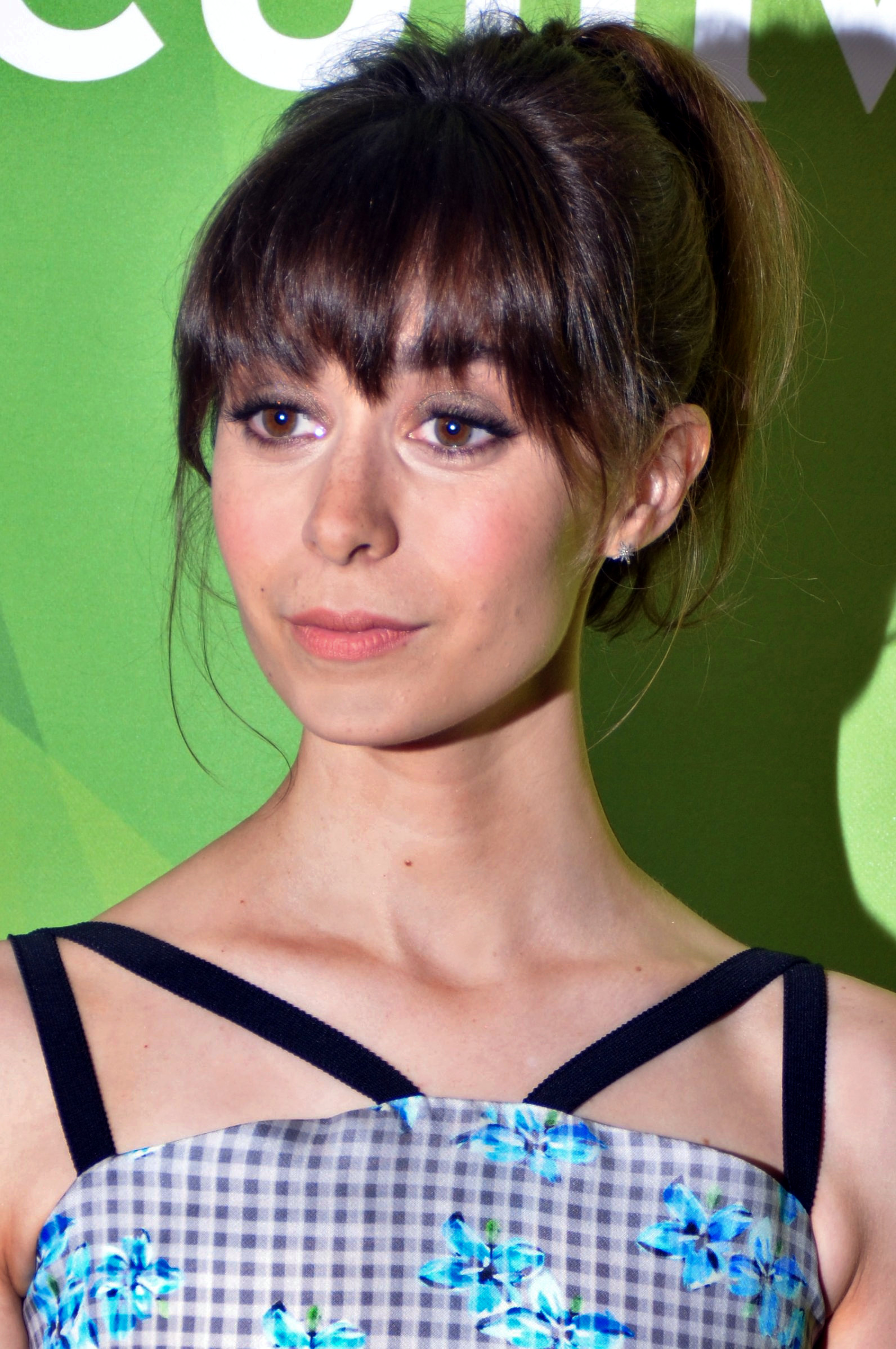
Cristin Milioti, Best Supporting Actress in a Television Series winner

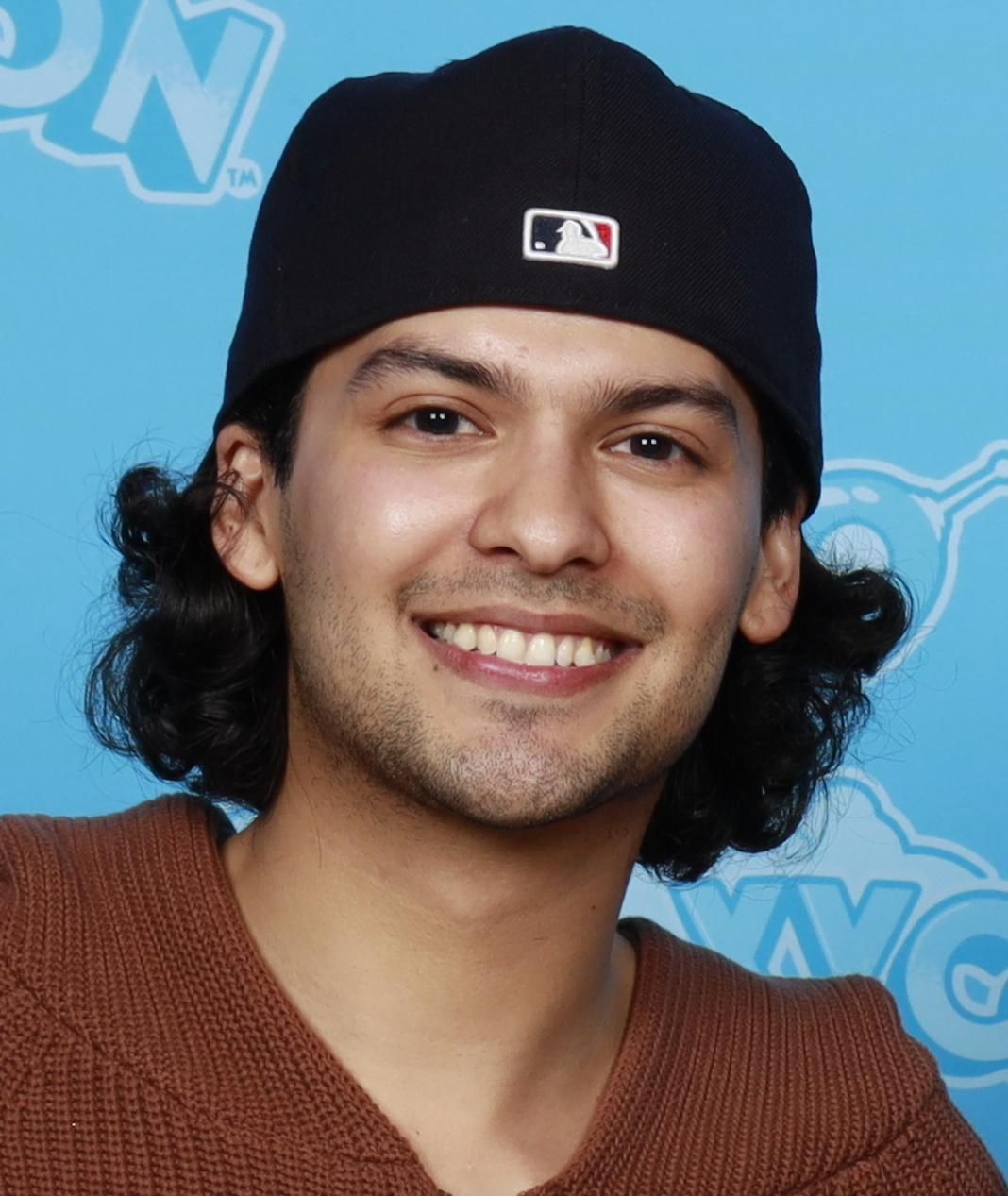
Xolo Maridueña, Best Young Performer in a Television Series winner

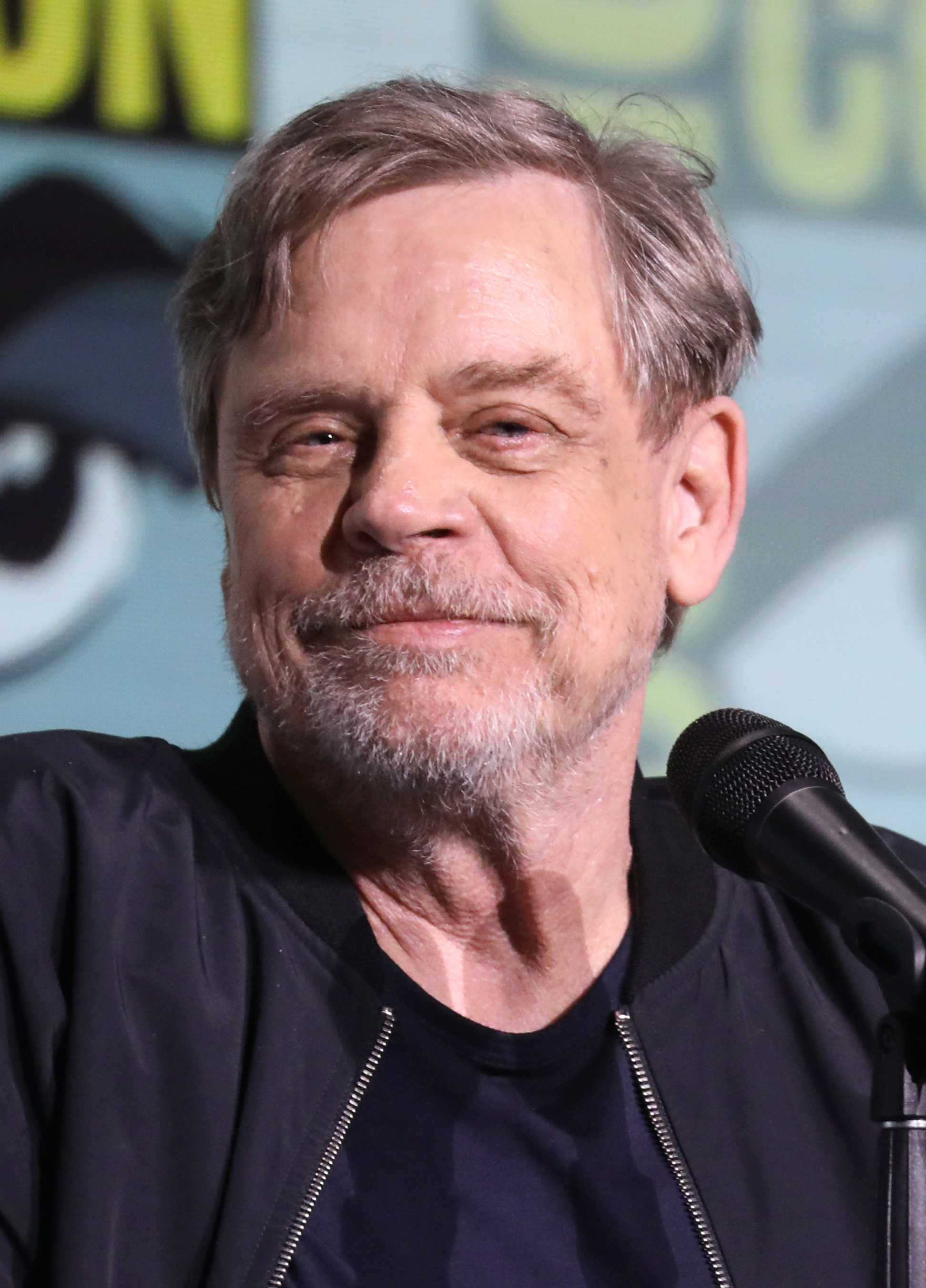
Mark Hamill, Best Guest Star in a Television Series winner

Best Actor in a Television Series	Best Actress in a Television Series
Colin Farrell – The Penguin as Oswald "Oz" Cobb / The Penguin (Max); Walton Goggins – Fallout as The Ghoul / Cooper Howard (Prime Video); Jon Hamm – Fargo as Sheriff Roy Tillman (FX); Andrew Lincoln – The Walking Dead: The Ones Who Live as Rick Grimes (AMC); Harold Perrineau – From as Boyd Stevens (MGM+); Norman Reedus – The Walking Dead: Daryl Dixon as Daryl Dixon (AMC); Kurt Russell and Wyatt Russell – Monarch: Legacy of Monsters as Lee Shaw (Apple TV+)	Rosario Dawson – Ahsoka as Ahsoka Tano (Disney+); Emma D'Arcy – House of the Dragon as Princess / Queen Rhaenyra Targaryen (Max); Jodie Foster – True Detective: Night Country as Chief Liz Danvers (Max); Danai Gurira – The Walking Dead: The Ones Who Live as Michonne (AMC); Kathryn Hahn – Agatha All Along as Agatha Harkness (Disney+); Melissa McBride – The Walking Dead: Daryl Dixon as Carol Peletier (AMC); Ella Purnell – Fallout as Lucy MacLean (Prime Video)
Best Supporting Actor in a Television Series	Best Supporting Actress in a Television Series
Antony Starr – The Boys as Homelander (Prime Video); Matt Berry – What We Do in the Shadows as Leslie "Laszlo" Cravensworth (FX); Brandon Scott Jones – Ghosts as Captain Isaac Higgintoot (CBS); Lamorne Morris – Fargo as Deputy Whitley "Witt" Farr (FX); Aaron Moten – Fallout as Maximus (Prime Video); Matt Smith – House of the Dragon as Prince / King Consort Daemon Targaryen (Max); Henry Thomas – The Fall of the House of Usher as Frederick Usher (Netflix)	Cristin Milioti – The Penguin as Sofia Falcone (Max); Jennifer Connelly – Dark Matter as Daniela Dessen (Apple TV+); Jennifer Jason Leigh – Fargo as Lorraine Lyon (FX); Pollyanna McIntosh – The Walking Dead: The Ones Who Live as Jadis Stokes / Anne (AMC); Elizabeth Saunders – From as Donna Raines (MGM+); Anna Sawai – Monarch: Legacy of Monsters as Cate Randa (Apple TV+); Rebecca Wisocky – Ghosts as Henrietta "Hetty" Woodstone (CBS)
Best Young Performer in a Television Series	Best Guest Star in a Television Series
Xolo Maridueña – Cobra Kai as Miguel Diaz (Netflix); Zackary Arthur – Chucky as Jake Wheeler (Syfy); Hannah Cheramy – From as Julie Matthews (MGM+); Cameron Crovetti – The Boys as Ryan (Prime Video); Rhenzy Feliz – The Penguin as Victor "Vic" Aguilar (Max); Joe Locke – Agatha All Along as Billy Maximoff / William Kaplan (Disney+); Louis Puech Scigliuzzi – The Walking Dead: Daryl Dixon as Laurent Carriere (AMC)	Mark Hamill – The Fall of the House of Usher as Arthur Gordon Pym (Netflix); Matthew Jeffers – The Walking Dead: The Ones Who Live as Nat (AMC); Martin Kove – Cobra Kai as John Kreese (Netflix); Kyle MacLachlan – Fallout as Hank MacLean (Prime Video); Andrea Martin – Evil as Sister Andrea (Paramount+); Aubrey Plaza – Agatha All Along as Death (Disney+); Ke Huy Quan – Loki as O.B. / A.D. Doug, Ph.D (Disney+)

=== Home Entertainment ===
Best 4K Home Media Release	Best Classic Film Home Media Release
Saw X (Lionsgate Home Entertainment); Conan the Barbarian (Arrow Video); Crimson Peak (Arrow Video); The Crow (Paramount); Face/Off (KL Studio Classics); The Monster Squad (KL Studio Classics)	Invasion of the Body Snatchers (KL Studio Classics); I Walked with a Zombie / The Seventh Victim (Criterion Collection); The Ladykillers (KL Studio Classics); A Nightmare on Elm Street (Warner Home Video); Repo Man (Criterion Collection); Reptilicus (Vinegar Syndrome)
Best Film Home Media Collection Release	Best Television Home Media Release
Batman: 85th Anniversary Collection (Warner Home Video); Nature Run Amok Collection (Kino Cult); OSS 117: Five Film Collection (KL Studio Classics); Republic Pictures Horror Collection (KL Studio Classics); Rocky: Ultimate Knockout Collection (Warner Home Video); Sci-Fi Chillers Collection (KL Studio Classics)	Star Wars: Andor – The Complete First Season (Sony Pictures Home Entertainment); The Adventures of Ozzie and Harriet: The Complete Series (MPI); Columbo: The Return (KL Studio Classics); Farscape: The Complete Series (25th Anniversary Edition) (Shout); Interview with the Vampire (Season 2) (RLJ Entertainment); La Brea: The Complete Series (Universal)

=== Special Achievement Awards ===
- Spotlight Award – Fallout
- Dan Curtis Legacy Award – Superman & Lois
- Lifetime Achievement Award – William Shatner
- Robert Forster Artist's Award – Hiroyuki Sanada
- Lance Reddick Legacy Award – Laurence Fishburne
- George Pal Memorial Award – The 40th Anniversary of Back to the Future

== Multiple nominations ==
Film
Nominations	Film	Genre	Distributor(s)
14	Dune: Part Two	Science Fiction	Warner Bros. Pictures / Legendary Pictures
13	Beetlejuice Beetlejuice	Fantasy	Warner Bros. Pictures
10	Deadpool & Wolverine	Action / Adventure	Marvel / Walt Disney Studios
8	Kingdom of the Planet of the Apes	Science Fiction	20th Century Studios
7	Alien: Romulus	Horror	20th Century Studios
7	Strange Darling	Thriller	Miramax / Magenta Light Studios
5	The Hunger Games: The Ballad of Songbirds & Snakes	Science Fiction	Lionsgate Films
5	Longlegs	Horror	Neon
4	Ghostbusters: Frozen Empire	Fantasy	Sony Pictures
4	Godzilla Minus One	Fantasy	Toho International
4	Smile 2	Horror	Paramount Pictures
4	The Substance	Horror	MUBI
3	Furiosa: A Mad Max Saga	Science Fiction	Warner Bros. Pictures
3	Wonka	Fantasy	Warner Bros. Pictures
2	Abigail	Horror	Universal Pictures
2	Civil War	Thriller	A24
2	Dream Scenario	Horror	A24
2	Godzilla x Kong: The New Empire	Fantasy	Warner Bros. Pictures / Legendary Pictures
2	Late Night with the Devil	Horror	IFC Films / Shudder
2	A Quiet Place: Day One	Horror	Paramount Pictures
2	Thelma	Comedy	Magnolia Pictures
2	The Thicket	Thriller	Tubi Movies
2	Twisters	Action / Adventure	Universal Pictures

Television
Nominations	Series	Genre	Network
5	Fallout	Science Fiction	Prime Video
5	The Walking Dead: The Ones Who Live	Horror	AMC
4	Agatha All Along	Superhero	Disney+
4	Fargo	Action / Thriller	FX
4	From	Horror	MGM+
4	The Penguin	Superhero	Max
4	The Walking Dead: Daryl Dixon	Horror	AMC
3	The Boys	Superhero	Prime Video
3	Cobra Kai	Action / Thriller	Netflix
3	The Fall of the House of Usher	Horror	Netflix
3	Ghosts	Comedy	CBS
3	House of the Dragon	Fantasy	Max
3	Monarch: Legacy of Monsters	Adventure	Apple TV+
2	Ahsoka	Science Fiction	Disney+
2	Anne Rice's Interview with the Vampire	Horror	AMC
2	Chucky	Comedy	Syfy
2	Dark Matter	Science Fiction	Apple TV+
2	Evil	Horror	Paramount+
2	La Brea	Adventure	NBC
2	Loki	Superhero	Disney+
2	True Detective: Night Country	Action / Thriller	Max
2	What We Do in the Shadows	Comedy	FX

== Multiple wins ==
Film
Wins	Film	Genre	Distributor(s)
5	Dune: Part Two	Science Fiction	Warner Bros. Pictures / Legendary Pictures
4	Beetlejuice Beetlejuice	Fantasy	Warner Bros. Pictures
3	Deadpool & Wolverine	Action / Adventure	Marvel / Walt Disney Studios
2	The Substance	Horror	MUBI

Television
Wins	Series	Genre	Network
2	Cobra Kai	Action / Thriller	Netflix
2	Fallout	Science Fiction	Prime Video
2	The Penguin	Superhero	Max
