= List of 2024 box office number-one films in Chile =

This is a list of films which placed number-one at the weekend box office in Chile during 2024. Amounts are in American dollars.

== Films ==
#	Weekend end date	Film	Box office	Openings in the top ten	Ref.
1	January 7, 2024	Wish	$292,767	Night Swim #2	
2	January 14, 2024	Wish	$153,464	The Holdovers #4	
3	January 21, 2024	Wish	$116,800		
4	January 28, 2024	Poor Things	$117,755		
5	February 4, 2024	Wish	$89,122		
6	February 11, 2024	Wish	$76,057		
7	February 18, 2024	Wish	$60,244		
8	February 25, 2024	Wish	$59,982		
9	March 3, 2024	Wish	$35,239	All of Us Strangers #4	
10	March 10, 2024	Kung Fu Panda 4	$1,055,757		
11	March 17, 2024	Kung Fu Panda 4	$805,331		
12	March 24, 2024	Kung Fu Panda 4	$501,981		
13	March 31, 2024	One Life	$21,693		
14	April 7, 2024	Kung Fu Panda 4	$277,665	The First Omen #2	
15	April 14, 2024	Kung Fu Panda 4	$197,289	Back to Black #3	
16	April 21, 2024	Kung Fu Panda 4	$120,353		
17	April 28, 2024	Kung Fu Panda 4	$135,941	The Fall Guy #3	
18	May 5, 2024	The First Omen	$66,217	Love Lies Bleeding #4	
19	May 12, 2024	Kingdom of the Planet of the Apes	$719,755		
20	May 19, 2024	Kingdom of the Planet of the Apes	$471,674		
21	May 26, 2024	Kingdom of the Planet of the Apes	$265,013		
22	June 2, 2024	Haikyu!! The Dumpster Battle	$515,000		
23	June 9, 2024	Kingdom of the Planet of the Apes	$135,718		
24	June 16, 2024	Inside Out 2	$4,705,080		
25	June 23, 2024	Inside Out 2	$3,981,906		
26	June 30, 2024	Despicable Me 4	$2,397,093		
27	July 7, 2024	Inside Out 2	$1,548,075		
28	July 14, 2024	Despicable Me 4	$592,362	Twisters #3, MaXXXine #4	
29	July 21, 2024	Despicable Me 4	$397,842		
30	July 28, 2024	Deadpool & Wolverine	$3,231,278		
31	August 4, 2024	Deadpool & Wolverine	$1,662,772		
32	August 11, 2024	Deadpool & Wolverine	$1,064,012		
33	August 18, 2024	Deadpool & Wolverine	$763,678	Alien: Romulus #2	
34	August 25, 2024	Deadpool & Wolverine	$303,262	The Crow #4	
35	September 1, 2024	Deadpool & Wolverine	$255,232	The Forge #6	
36	September 8, 2024	Deadpool & Wolverine	$137,405	Kinds of Kindness #4	
37	September 15, 2024	Deadpool & Wolverine	$76,926	Speak No Evil #2	
38	September 22, 2024	Deadpool & Wolverine	$69,186		
39	September 29, 2024	The Wild Robot	$421,926		
40	October 6, 2024	The Wild Robot	$375,792		
41	October 13, 2024	The Wild Robot	$434,446		
42	October 20, 2024	The Wild Robot	$406,333		
43	October 27, 2024	The Wild Robot	$227,055		
44	November 3, 2024	The Wild Robot	$423,558	Anora #3	
45	November 10, 2024	The Wild Robot	$178,490		
46	November 17, 2024	The Wild Robot	$145,045		
47	November 24, 2024	Wicked	$151,198		
48	December 1, 2024	Moana 2	$2,197,352		
49	December 8, 2024	Moana 2	$1,224,402		
50	December 15, 2024	Moana 2	$622,790		
51	December 22, 2024	Mufasa: The Lion King	$679,926		
52	December 29, 2024	Sonic the Hedgehog 3	$970,000		

Preceded by 2023 Box office number-one films	Box office number-one films 2024	Succeeded by 2025 Box office number-one films
