= List of 2022 box office number-one films in Chile =

This is a list of films which placed number-one at the weekend box office in Chile during 2022. Amounts are in American dollars.

== Films ==
#	Weekend end date	Film	Box office	Openings in the top ten	Ref.
1	January 9, 2022	Encanto	$6,795		
2	January 16, 2022	The King's Man	$56,304		
3	January 23, 2022	Spencer	$50,966		
4	January 30, 2022	Spencer	$32,991	Nightmare Alley #2, The 355 #3	
5	February 6, 2022	Spencer	$19,006		
6	February 13, 2022	Death on the Nile	$25,437	The Beatles: Get Back #3	
7	February 20, 2022	Death on the Nile	$13,232		
8	February 27, 2022	Death on the Nile	$8,382		
9	March 6, 2022	Spencer	$3,959		
10	March 13, 2022	Sing 2	$33,692	Belfast #2	
11	March 20, 2022	The Bad Guys	$213,000		
12	March 27, 2022	Sing 2	$5,620		
13	April 3, 2022	The Bad Guys	$173,524		
14	April 10, 2022	The Bad Guys	$84,720		
15	April 17, 2022	The Bad Guys	$40,911		
16	April 24, 2022	The Bad Guys	$15,532		
17	May 1, 2022	The Bad Guys	$18,142		
18	May 8, 2022	Doctor Strange in the Multiverse of Madness	$3,160,744		
19	May 15, 2022	Doctor Strange in the Multiverse of Madness	$1,291,480	Dog #2	
20	May 22, 2022	Doctor Strange in the Multiverse of Madness	$687,701	The Unbearable Weight of Massive Talent #2	
21	May 29, 2022	Doctor Strange in the Multiverse of Madness	$376,353	The Bob's Burgers Movie #5	
22	June 5, 2022	Jurassic World: Dominion	$1,616,000		
23	June 12, 2022	Jurassic World: Dominion	$1,072,000		
24	June 19, 2022	Lightyear	$695,307		
25	June 26, 2022	Lightyear	$437,616		
26	July 3, 2022	Minions: The Rise of Gru	$1,641,000		
27	July 10, 2022	Thor: Love and Thunder	$1,795,896		
28	July 17, 2022	Minions: The Rise of Gru	$1,076,172		
29	July 24, 2022	Minions: The Rise of Gru	$866,120	The Black Phone #3	
30	July 31, 2022	Minions: The Rise of Gru	$336,356		
31	August 7, 2022	Minions: The Rise of Gru	$338,813		
32	August 14, 2022	Minions: The Rise of Gru	$147,392		
33	August 21, 2022	Minions: The Rise of Gru	$75,333		
34	August 28, 2022	Nope	$53,900		
35	September 4, 2022	Minions: The Rise of Gru	$31,024	Three Thousand Years of Longing #5	
36	September 11, 2022	Barbarian	$53,709		
37	September 18, 2022	Ticket to Paradise	$20,774		
38	September 25, 2022	Avatar	$231,178		
39	October 2, 2022	Avatar	$163,009		
40	October 9, 2022	Avatar	$118,995	Amsterdam #2	
41	October 16, 2022	Halloween Ends	$129,431		
42	October 23, 2022	Halloween Ends	$44,086	See How They Run #3	
43	October 30, 2022	Halloween Ends	$23,053		
44	November 6, 2022	Minions: The Rise of Gru	$7,161		
45	November 13, 2022	Black Panther: Wakanda Forever	$1,356,629	Mrs. Harris Goes to Paris #3	
46	November 20, 2022	Black Panther: Wakanda Forever	$517,665		
47	November 27, 2022	Black Panther: Wakanda Forever	$260,925	Strange World #2, Bros #5	
48	December 4, 2022	Black Panther: Wakanda Forever	$221,084	Violent Night #3, The Menu #4	
49	December 11, 2022	Black Panther: Wakanda Forever	$186,251		
50	December 18, 2022	Avatar: The Way of Water	$2,345,003		
51	December 25, 2022	Avatar: The Way of Water	$831,950		
52	January 1, 2023	Avatar: The Way of Water	$907,885	Puss in Boots: The Last Wish #2	

Preceded by 2021 Box office number-one films	Box office number-one films 2022	Succeeded by 2023 Box office number-one films
