= Rodney Burke =

Australian special effects artist

- Occupation: Special effects artist

Rodney Burke is an Australian special effects artist. He was nominated for an Academy Award in the category Best Visual Effects for the film Kingdom of the Planet of the Apes.

== Selected filmography ==
- Kingdom of the Planet of the Apes (2024; co-nominated with Erik Winquist, Stephen Unterfranz and Paul Story)
