= Paul Story =

New Zealand visual effects artist

- Occupation: Visual effects artist

Paul Story is a New Zealand visual effects artist. He was nominated for an Academy Award in the category Best Visual Effects for the film Kingdom of the Planet of the Apes.

== Selected filmography ==
- Kingdom of the Planet of the Apes (2024; co-nominated with Erik Winquist, Stephen Unterfranz and Rodney Burke)
