= List of 2025 box office number-one films in Chile =

This is a list of films which placed number-one at the weekend box office in Chile during 2025. Amounts are in American dollars.

== Films ==
#	Weekend end date	Film	Box office	Openings in the top ten	Ref.
1	January 5, 2025	Mufasa: The Lion King	$518,963	Nosferatu #2, Maria #4	
2	January 12, 2025	Mufasa: The Lion King	$348,978		
3	January 19, 2025	Mufasa: The Lion King	$278,128		
4	January 26, 2025	Mufasa: The Lion King	$222,934	Wolf Man #4, Den of Thieves: Pantera #5, A Real Pain #6	
5	February 2, 2025	Mufasa: The Lion King	$205,096	Dog Man #2, Flight Risk #5	
6	February 9, 2025	Mufasa: The Lion King	$173,890		
7	February 16, 2025	Captain America: Brave New World	$771,460	Bridget Jones: Mad About the Boy #3	
8	February 23, 2025	Captain America: Brave New World	$324,020	The Brutalist #3, Conclave #4, A Complete Unknown #6	
9	March 2, 2025	Captain America: Brave New World	$210,891	The Monkey #2	
10	March 9, 2025	Captain America: Brave New World	$116,352		
11	March 16, 2025	Captain America: Brave New World	$81,156		
12	March 23, 2025	Snow White	$356,333	Black Bag #3	
13	March 30, 2025	Snow White	$201,361		
14	April 6, 2025	The Monkey	$123,358		
15	April 13, 2025	The Amateur	$84,066		
16	April 20, 2025	The Amateur	$75,570	Drop #2	
17	April 27, 2025	Star Wars: Episode III - Revenge of the Sith	$366,549		
18	May 4, 2025	Thunderbolts*	$870,367		
19	May 11, 2025	Thunderbolts*	$345,658		
20	May 18, 2025	Thunderbolts*	$229,304		
21	May 25, 2025	Lilo & Stitch	$3,983,624		
22	June 1, 2025	Lilo & Stitch	$2,849,486		
23	June 8, 2025	Lilo & Stitch	$1,553,502	Ballerina #2, The Phoenician Scheme #3	
24	June 15, 2025	How to Train Your Dragon	$1,634,099		
25	June 22, 2025	How to Train Your Dragon	$1,378,044	Elio #3	
26	June 29, 2025	How to Train Your Dragon	$654,002	M3GAN 2.0 #4	
27	July 6, 2025	Jurassic World: Rebirth	$2,071,022		
28	July 13, 2025	Jurassic World: Rebirth	$709,508		
29	July 20, 2025	Jurassic World: Rebirth	$484,609		
30	July 27, 2025	The Fantastic Four: First Steps	$1,471,595		
31	August 3, 2025	The Fantastic Four: First Steps	$773,757	The Bad Guys 2 #2	
32	August 10, 2025	The Fantastic Four: First Steps	$450,163	Freakier Friday #2	
33	August 17, 2025	The Fantastic Four: First Steps	$300,934		
34	August 24, 2025	Freakier Friday	$165,864	Nobody 2 #5	
35	August 31, 2025	Freakier Friday	$144,615	The Roses #5	
36	September 7, 2025	Freakier Friday	$75,843	The Life of Chuck #4	
37	September 14, 2025	Toy Story	$41,893		
38	September 21, 2025	Toy Story	$21,076	Him #4	
39	September 28, 2025	Hamilton	$113,170	Gabby's Dollhouse: The Movie #2	
40	October 5, 2025	Avatar: The Way of Water	$64,122	Downton Abbey: The Grand Finale #3, Sketch #5	
41	October 12, 2025	Tron: Ares	$167,235		
42	October 19, 2025	Black Phone 2	$195,036	The Smashing Machine #3	
43	October 26, 2025	Black Phone 2	$140,151		
44	November 2, 2025	Black Phone 2	$125,880	Good Fortune #2, Springsteen: Deliver Me from Nowhere #5	
45	November 9, 2025	Predator: Badlands	$245,723	Roofman #4	
46	November 16, 2025	Predator: Badlands	$121,822		
47	November 23, 2025	Wicked: For Good	$246,582		
48	November 30, 2025	Zootopia 2	$1,274,945		
49	December 7, 2025	Five Nights at Freddy's 2	$1,246,709	The Threesome #5	
50	December 14, 2025	Zootopia 2	$473,348	Bugonia #3	
51	December 21, 2025	Avatar: Fire and Ash	$1,849,679		
52	December 28, 2025	Avatar: Fire and Ash	$1,303,101		

== Highest-grossing films ==
Highest-grossing films of 2025
Rank	Title	Distributor	Domestic gross
1	Lilo & Stitch	Walt Disney Pictures	$13,711,747
2	Avatar: Fire and Ash	Walt Disney Pictures	$9,171,000
3	Zootopia 2	Walt Disney Pictures	$7,779,000
4	Moana 2	Walt Disney Pictures	$7,254,521
5	How to Train Your Dragon	Universal	$7,105,489
6	Jurassic World Rebirth	Universal	$4,968,517
7	Mufasa: The Lion King	Walt Disney Pictures	$4,863,521
8	The Fantastic Four: First Steps	Walt Disney Pictures	$3,969,751
9	Five Nights at Freddy's 2	Universal	$2,756,134
10	Demon Slayer: Kimetsu no Yaiba – The Movie: Infinity Castle	Crunchyroll / Sony	$2,233,814

Preceded by 2024 Box office number-one films	Box office number-one films 2025	Succeeded by 2026 Box office number-one films
