= List of 2026 box office number-one films in Chile =

This is a list of films which placed number-one at the weekend box office in Chile during 2026. Amounts are in American dollars.

== Films ==
#	Weekend end date	Film	Box office	Openings in the top ten	Ref.
1	January 4, 2026	Avatar: Fire and Ash	$1,069,531		
2	January 11, 2026	Avatar: Fire and Ash	$781,467		
3	January 18, 2026	Avatar: Fire and Ash	$514,087	Hamnet #3	
4	January 25, 2026	Avatar: Fire and Ash	$371,766	Song Sung Blue #4	
5	February 1, 2026	Avatar: Fire and Ash	$288,731	Send Help #5; The History of Sound #6	
6	February 8, 2026	Avatar: Fire and Ash	$176,211		
7	February 15, 2026	Hamnet	$49,039		
8	February 22, 2026	Avatar: Fire and Ash	$139,613		
9	March 1, 2026	Avatar: Fire and Ash	$90,055		
10	March 8, 2026	Hoppers	$428,349	Hoppers #1; The Testament of Ann Lee #7	
11	March 15, 2026	Hoppers	$381,642	Shelter #2; Reminders of Him #3	
12	March 22, 2026	Hoppers	$282,000	Ready or Not 2: Here I Come #3	
13	March 29, 2026	Hoppers	$209,000		
14	April 5, 2026	The Super Mario Galaxy Movie	$2,606,887	The Super Mario Galaxy Movie #1	
15	April 12, 2026	The Super Mario Galaxy Movie	$2,486,157		
16	April 19, 2026	The Super Mario Galaxy Movie	$861,399	The Drama #2	
17	April 26, 2026	Michael	$1,561,501	Michael #1	
18	May 3, 2026	The Devil Wears Prada 2	$2,042,000	The Devil Wears Prada 2 #1	

Preceded by 2025 Box office number-one films	Box office number-one films 2026	Succeeded by 2027 Box office number-one films
