= Kingdom of the Planet of the Apes =

2024 American film by Wes Ball

- Theatrical release poster
- Directed by: Wes Ball
- Written by: Josh Friedman
- Based on: Characters by Rick Jaffa Amanda Silver; Premise from Planet of the Apes by Pierre Boulle
- Produced by: Wes Ball; Joe Hartwick Jr.; Rick Jaffa; Amanda Silver; Jason T. Reed
- Starring: Owen Teague; Freya Allan; Kevin Durand; Peter Macon; William H. Macy
- Cinematography: Gyula Pados
- Edited by: Dan Zimmerman; Dirk Westervelt
- Music by: John Paesano
- Production companies: 20th Century Studios; Oddball Entertainment; Jason T. Reed Productions
- Distributed by: 20th Century Studios
- Release dates: May 2, 2024 (TCL Chinese Theatre); May 10, 2024 (United States)
- Running time: 145 minutes
- Country: United States
- Language: English
- Budget: $120–160 million
- Box office: $397.3 million

Kingdom of the Planet of the Apes is a 2024 American science fiction action film directed by Wes Ball and written by Josh Friedman. It is the fourth installment in the Planet of the Apes reboot film series and the tenth film overall, serving as a standalone sequel to War for the Planet of the Apes (2017). The film stars Owen Teague, Freya Allan, Kevin Durand, Peter Macon, and William H. Macy. It takes place many generations after the events of War and follows Noa (Teague), a young chimpanzee hunter who embarks on a journey alongside Mae (Allan), a human woman, to determine the future for apes and humans alike.

Development on a new Planet of the Apes film began in April 2019, following Disney's acquisition of 20th Century Fox, with Ball attached as writer and director that December. Much of the screenplay was written during the COVID-19 pandemic in 2020, with casting commencing in June 2022, following the screenplay's completion. Teague was cast in the lead role that August, with the film's title and additional casting announced in the following months. Principal photography began in October 2022 in Sydney and wrapped in February 2023, with a budget of $120–160 million.

Kingdom of the Planet of the Apes premiered at the TCL Chinese Theatre in Los Angeles on May 2, 2024, and was released by 20th Century Studios in the United States on May 10. The film grossed over $397 million worldwide and received generally positive reviews from critics, though it was ultimately deemed inferior to its predecessors. It received a nomination for Best Visual Effects at the 97th Academy Awards. A sequel is in development.

== Plot ==
Generations after Caesar's death, (Note: As depicted in War for the Planet of the Apes (2017)) apes have become the dominant species on Earth, while most surviving humans have become feral.

Noa, a young chimpanzee from a falconry-practicing clan, prepares for a coming-of-age ceremony by collecting eagle eggs with his friends, Anaya and Soona. A human scavenger follows Noa home and inadvertently cracks his egg during a scuffle, before fleeing. While searching for a replacement egg, Noa encounters ape raiders with electric stun rods. While Noa hides from them, the apes follow his horse back to his clan. Noa hurries home to find his village burning; the gorilla general Sylva kills Noa's father, Koro, before dropping Noa from a high platform.

Noa awakens to find that his whole clan has been abducted. He buries Koro and sets out to rescue his clan. Noa is joined by Raka, an orangutan, who tells Noa about Caesar. The apes notice the human scavenger is following them and Raka offers her food and a blanket, naming her Nova. When the trio encounters feral humans with zebras, Sylva's raiders attack them. Noa and Raka rescue Nova, who to their surprise, is intelligent and can speak. She reveals that her name is Mae and that the ape raiders took Noa's clan to a beachfront settlement outside an old human vault. As they cross a bridge, they are ambushed by Sylva and his raiders. In the ensuing fight, Raka saves Mae from drowning, but is swept away by the rapids. Noa and Mae are captured and taken to the apes' settlement.

Noa reunites with his clan and is introduced to the apes' king, Proximus Caesar. Proximus has enslaved other several clans including Noa's, forcing them to work on opening the vault so that he can access the human technology locked inside. Proximus invites Noa to dinner with Mae and Trevathan, another speaking human, who teaches Proximus about human history and help him assemble the electric stun rods. Proximus believes that Noa's intuitiveness could help open the vault and warns him that Mae only has her own agenda.

Noa confronts Mae, demanding the truth in exchange for help. Mae discloses knowledge of a hidden entrance to the vault and seeks a book capable of restoring speech to humans. Noa agrees to help her enter and destroy the vault. Noa, Mae, Soona and Anaya secretly plant explosives around the sea walls that protect the settlement. Trevathan catches them and intends to warn Proximus, but Mae strangles him to death.

The group enters the vault, finding weapons and Mae's "book", which is actually a satellite decryption key. The apes discover picture books depicting humans as the once-dominant species and apes in cages at a zoo. As the group makes their way out of the bunker, they are confronted by Proximus and his followers. Lightning, one of Proximus's lieutenants, threatens to kill Soona, but Mae kills him with a handgun and triggers the explosives, flooding the bunker with the apes inside. Mae flees the settlement while the apes climb to higher ground through the bunker. Noa is pursued by Sylva, whom he traps and leaves to drown. Noa then escapes the bunker but is attacked by Proximus. Noa leads his clan in summoning their eagles to attack Proximus and send him falling from a cliff into the sea.

As Noa's clan returns to rebuild their home, Mae arrives to bid farewell to Noa, secretly holding her handgun behind her back. She explains that she destroyed the bunker to prevent the apes from obtaining its firearms. Given their disparities, Noa and Mae question whether apes and humans can co-exist peacefully. As Noa takes Soona to look through a telescope that he had found, Mae travels to an intelligent human settlement at a satellite base. She delivers the decryption key which allows them to reactivate their satellites and make contact with other human settlements.

== Cast ==
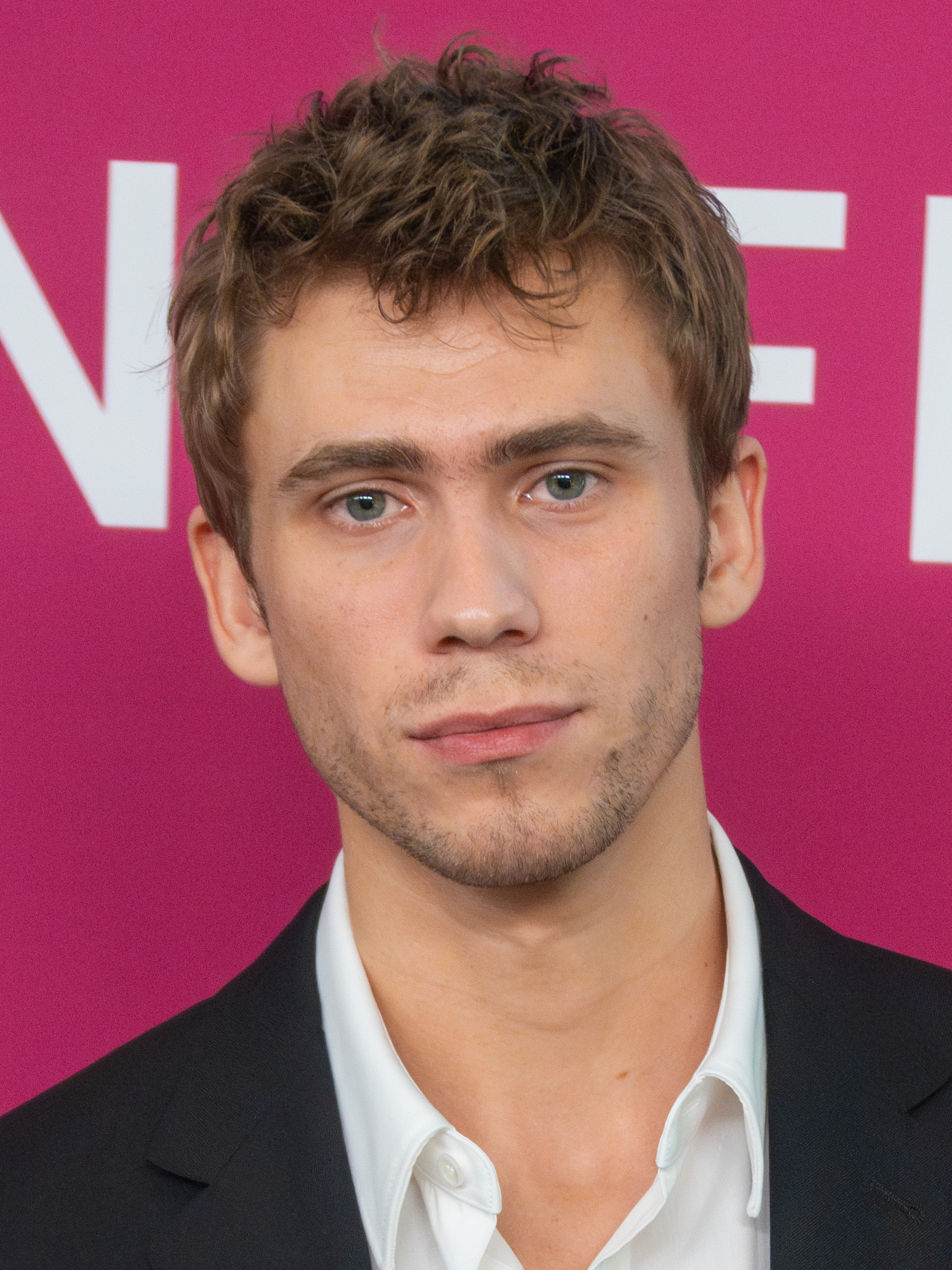
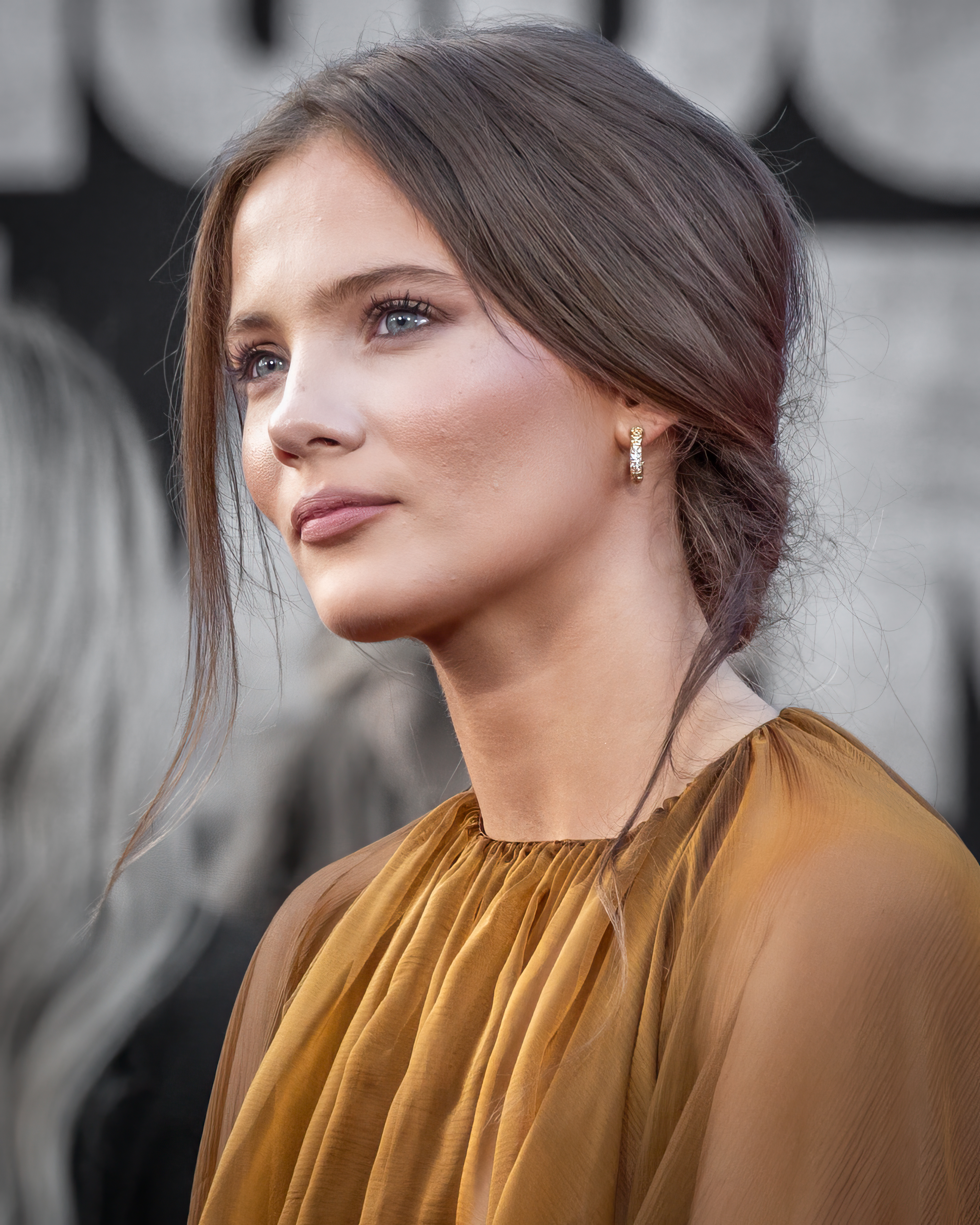
Owen Teague and Freya Allan play Noa and Mae respectively.

=== Apes ===
- Owen Teague as Noa, a young chimpanzee hunter and the heir to his falconry ape clan
- Kevin Durand as Proximus Caesar, a chimpanzee monarch who leads a coastal colony clan of apes in search of human technology and preaches an altered version of Caesar's teachings
- Peter Macon as Raka, a wise and virtuous Bornean orangutan scholar who becomes an ally of Noa and has a vast knowledge of Caesar's true teachings
- Lydia Peckham as Soona, a young female chimpanzee and Noa's love interest
- Travis Jeffery as Anaya, a young male chimpanzee and Noa's best friend
- Sara Wiseman as Dar, Noa's chimpanzee mother
- Neil Sandilands as Koro, Noa's chimpanzee father and the leader of the falconry ape clan
- Eka Darville as Sylva, a western lowland gorilla and the chief commander in Proximus's army and Proximus's second-in-command
- Ras-Samuel Weld A'abzgi as Lightning, a chimpanzee lieutenant in Proximus's army, Sylva's second-in-command and Proximus's third-in-command
- Kaden Hartcher as Oda, a chimpanzee in the falconry ape clan

Additionally, Karin Konoval and Terry Notary appear in the prologue, reprising their roles as Maurice the Bornean orangutan and Rocket the chimpanzee from the previous three films, while Caesar also appears in a silent cameo before his cremation.

=== Humans ===
- Freya Allan as Mae, a young woman who joins Noa on his journey while having her own agenda. She is given the name "Nova" by Noa and Raka
- William H. Macy as Trevathan, an opportunistic human who styles himself as Proximus Caesar's chief advisor and teaches him human history
- Dichen Lachman as Korina, a human leader of the human satellite base

== Production ==
=== Pre-production and writing ===
In October 2016, Dawn of the Planet of the Apes (2014) and War for the Planet of the Apes (2017) director Matt Reeves said that he had ideas for a fourth film in the Planet of the Apes reboot series. In mid-2017, as War was released, Reeves and co-writer Mark Bomback expressed further interest in sequels. Reeves said that Steve Zahn's character, Bad Ape, established a primate world "much larger" than just Caesar's group of apes, adding that there are apes "who grew up without the benefit of Caesar's leadership" and suggesting that conflict would arise if Caesar's apes should encounter such outsiders. Bomback felt that "there was probably only one more big chapter left to tell", explaining how Caesar "came to be this Moses figure in the Apes world". He suggested that other filmmakers might work on the sequel and that it could take place hundreds of years after War. Despite this, he clarified that there had not been conversations on a potential sequel, expressing his desire to "take a breather and let things rest a bit."

In April 2019, following the Walt Disney Company's acquisition of 20th Century Fox, Walt Disney Studios announced that further Planet of the Apes films were in development. In August, it was confirmed that any future installments would be set in the same universe first established in Rise of the Planet of the Apes (2011). In December, it was announced that Wes Ball would write and direct the film, after having previously worked with Reeves on a film adaptation of Mouse Guard. After that film was canceled by Disney following the merger, the studio approached Ball on developing a new Planet of the Apes film.

In February 2020, Ball confirmed that the film would not be a reboot, instead chronicling "Caesar's legacy". Joe Hartwick Jr. and David Starke were also confirmed to serve as producers. In April, it was announced that Peter Chernin, who produced the previous installments through Chernin Entertainment, would serve as executive producer. The film will be one of the company's last films before it leaves 20th Century for Netflix. The next month, it was revealed that Josh Friedman would co-write the script with Ball, and that Rick Jaffa and Amanda Silver would return to produce the film after doing so for the previous installments. Ball and Friedman would discuss the script through Zoom video calls, a routine which continued as the COVID-19 pandemic began. Instead of a direct sequel to War, Ball stated that the film would feel more like a follow-up to the previous films, and commented that the film could begin virtual production soon in spite of the pandemic due to the fact that much of the film contained computer-generated imagery (CGI).

In March 2022, 20th Century president Steve Asbell stated that he was expecting a screenplay draft shortly, aiming for production to begin by the end of the year. By June, Oddball Entertainment and Shinbone Productions were also set to produce the film, while the search for the main star was underway following the script's completion the previous month. The film's title was revealed to be Kingdom of the Planet of the Apes in September 2022, with the film revealed to take place many years after the events of War. Jaffa, Silver, and Patrick Aison joined the writing team, with Ball no longer credited as screenwriter. Jason Reed and Jenno Topping were also announced as producer and executive producer, respectively, while Starke was no longer expected to serve as producer.

Ball stated the film was set during the "Dark Ages", where the apes rediscover lost items from the past in "this grand adventure"; Kingdom of the Planet of the Apes takes place 300 years following Caesar's death. He felt the protagonist Noa was neither a child nor adult, but a figure placed in "extraordinary" circumstances and living in a nomadic ape tribe. Teague also stated that Noa doesn't have a self-perception of identity but was inspired by Caesar's legacy and message of "apes together strong". He compared the antagonist, Proximus, to that of inventor Thomas Edison as he had rediscovered electricity, which was knowledge lost during the Dark Ages. Durand felt that the name Proximus Caesar was a self-proclaimed title, as his goal was to ensure the continued prosperity of apes despite subverting Caesar's original teachings. He had the idea to change the timeframe after taking inspiration from the film Apocalypto (2006), as it had provided him an opportunity for a "whole new trajectory". Hartwick Jr. stated that the film was focusing on Noa exploring the world for the first time.

Ball intended for what Noa, Mae, and Soona saw through the telescope in the middle and end of the film would remain ambiguous, saying, "I figured there is nothing I could show you that would be stronger than what the audience's imagination would conjure up... Sure, it might turn some people off, but some people will like it. I have ideas of what they're looking at... Space obviously is a key idea in all of these movies. So, maybe it's them looking to the future?"

=== Casting ===
In August 2022, Owen Teague joined the cast of the film in the lead motion-capture role. The next month, Freya Allan and Peter Macon joined the cast with the announcement of the film's title and release year, as did Eka Darville and Kevin Durand in October. Travis Jeffery, Neil Sandilands, Sara Wiseman, Lydia Peckham and Ras-Samuel Weld A'abzgi were added to the cast later that month, while William H. Macy and Dichen Lachman were cast in January and February 2023, respectively. Matthew Lillard auditioned for an ape role in the film.

After being cast, Teague began to volunteer and study the animals at the Center for Great Apes in Florida. At first, he studied chimpanzees as a whole to see their typical day and examine how they move. However, he was drawn to a specific chimpanzee, Bentley. It was Bentley's curious nature that made Teague resonate with him. Teague says it was Bentley that inspired how he developed the character of Noa as an actor.

=== Filming ===
Principal photography began in October 2022 at Disney Studios Australia in Sydney, with funding partially provided by the Australian Government, under the working title Forbidden Zone. Filming concluded on February 15, 2023. Ball added filming primarily occurred on location alongside using motion-capture technology.

=== Post-production and visual effects ===
Erik Winquist served as the visual effects supervisor, with vendors including Wētā FX, which had previously done work on the prior three Planet of the Apes reboot films. Ball stated the film did not use The Volume technology, which had previously been employed for The Mandalorian, focusing on filming on-location and using full CG. He went on to compare the film's CG to that of James Cameron's Avatar franchise. The team used techniques for their previous film Avatar: The Way of Water (2022) when working on an action sequence involving a human-hunt taking place on rivers. This was due to requiring the CG models of apes based on motion-capture performances to appear realistic when interacting with water.

== Music ==
John Paesano, who had previously collaborated with Ball on the Maze Runner film trilogy (2014–2018), composed the film score for Kingdom of the Planet of the Apes. Paesano incorporated Jerry Goldsmith's original themes from the 1968 film within the score, describing it as "the musical legacy". The soundtrack was released by Hollywood Records on May 10, 2024.

== Release ==
Kingdom of the Planet of the Apes held its world premiere at the TCL Chinese Theatre in Los Angeles on May 2, 2024, followed by an early access screening on May 8. It was released in the United States on May 10, in both conventional theaters and in IMAX, Dolby Cinema, 4DX, and ScreenX. The film was previously set for release on May 24, but was rescheduled two weeks earlier to avoid competition with Furiosa: A Mad Max Saga and The Garfield Movie during Memorial Day weekend.

=== Marketing ===
A teaser trailer was released on November 2, 2023. Bryan Britt of Inverse compared the film's premise to that of the original Planet of the Apes film from 1968. A second trailer premiered during Super Bowl LVIII on February 11, 2024. As part of a viral marketing campaign in California, actors wearing realistic ape costumes were dispatched on horseback to Venice Beach and Crissy Field in April 2024. This campaign extended to the New York City Metropolitan area as similar actors on horseback were seen at Liberty State Park with the Manhattan skyline and Statue of Liberty in the background.

=== Home media ===
Kingdom of the Planet of the Apes was released on premium video on demand (PVOD) on July 9, 2024, by 20th Century Studios, followed by its release on Ultra HD Blu-ray, Blu-ray and DVD on August 27, 2024, by Sony Pictures Home Entertainment. The Ultra HD Blu-ray edition included Inside the Lens: The Raw Cut, a full-length alternative version showing the filmmaking process and the actors' raw motion-capture performances prior to the addition of visual effects. The film became available for streaming on Hulu in the United States and on Disney+ internationally on August 2, 2024.

Nielsen Media Research, which records streaming viewership on some U.S. television screens, reported that Kingdom of the Planet of the Apes was watched for 560 million minutes between July 29 and August 4, 2024, ranking as the second most-streamed film. The following week, from August 5–11, it was watched for 435 million minutes, again ranking second. Between August 12–18, it was streamed for 206 million minutes, ranking as the tenth most-streamed film that week. In 2025, between August 11–17, Kingdom of the Planet of the Apes recorded 171 million minutes of viewing, ranking tenth among films that week. As of August 17, Kingdom of the Planet of the Apes ranked second on Prime Video's Top 10 movies in the United States chart, behind The Pickup and ahead of War of the Worlds.

== Reception ==
=== Box office ===
Kingdom of the Planet of the Apes grossed $171.1 million in the United States and Canada, and $226.2 million in other territories, for a worldwide total of $397.4 million.

In the United States and Canada, Kingdom of the Planet of the Apes was projected to gross $50–55 million from 4,075 theaters in its opening weekend. The film made $22.2 million on its first day, including $6.6 million from preview screenings ($1.6 million on Wednesday and $5 million on Thursday). It went on to debut to $58.4 million, topping the box office and marking the third-best opening weekend of the franchise behind Dawn of the Planet of the Apes ($72.6 million in 2014) and Tim Burton's Planet of the Apes ($68.5 million in 2001). In its second weekend, the film made $25.5 million (a drop of 56%), finishing second behind newcomer IF, and then came in fourth place the following weekend with $13.4 million.

Outside the U.S., Kingdom was projected to debut to $80–90 million. It ended up making $72.7 million, for a worldwide opening of $129 million, with the largest markets being China ($11.4 million), France ($7.1 million), Mexico ($6.4 million), the United Kingdom ($4.8 million), South Korea ($3.2 million), Australia ($2.7 million), Brazil ($2.6 million), Germany ($2.2 million), and Spain ($2.2 million).

=== Critical response ===
According to the review aggregator website Rotten Tomatoes, critics described the film as having "Avatar-level visual effects", complemented by "standout performances and top-notch action", although "it doesn't quite meet the heights of its predecessors". On the website, 80% of 323 critics' reviews are positive, with an average rating of 7/10. The site's critics consensus reads: "Carving out a new era for The Planet of the Apes with lovable characters and rich visuals, Kingdom doesn't take the crown as best of the franchise but handily justifies its continued reign." Metacritic, which uses a weighted average, assigned the film a score of 66 out of 100, based on 57 critics, indicating "generally favorable" reviews. Audiences polled by CinemaScore gave the film an average grade of "B" on an A+ to F scale, down from the "A−" earned by the three previous films, while those polled by PostTrak gave it a 77% overall positive score.

Writing for The New York Times, critic Alissa Wilkinson called the film "uncommonly thoughtful, even insightful". Ty Burr of The Washington Post praised the film's visuals, describing the computer generated primates as "breathtakingly hyper-real". However, Burr criticized the human characters as "two-dimensional", including Mae, who he viewed as a "plot device more than a human being". Clarisse Loughrey of The Independent called the film "traditional and robustly crafted, in a way that's deferential less to the trends of today than to some half-remembered dream of Hollywood's classical epics".

Charles Pulliam-Moore of The Verge disliked the tendency of the plot to lay the ground for "sequels down the line [rather] than to really dig into the substance at hand". Jake Wilson of The Age gave it 2/5 stars, writing, "Plainly, this is not a movie to be taken too seriously, but at nearly two-and-a-half hours, it's also much too slow and ponderous to qualify as a campy good time." Caryn James of BBC criticized the fact that the film repeats various elements of the precedent instalment, stating, "If you have seen War for the Planet of the Apes (2017), the final instalment of the Caesar trilogy, you might be astonished at how derivative the last stretch of Kingdom is. Once again, a ruthless leader holds apes prisoner in an abandoned weapons depot. This time everything is rusted from age and the ruler is Proximus instead of Woody Harrelson's Colonel, but still."

=== Accolades ===
Award	Date of ceremony	Category	Recipient(s)	Result	Ref.
Academy Awards	March 2, 2025	Best Visual Effects	Erik Winquist, Stephen Unterfranz, Paul Story, and Rodney Burke	Nominated	
Annie Awards	February 8, 2025	Best Character Animation – Live Action	Christian Kickenweitz, Aidan Martin, Allison Orr, Radiya Alam, and Howard Sly	Won	
Astra Film Awards	December 8, 2024	Best Action or Science Fiction Feature	Kingdom of the Planet of the Apes	Nominated	
Astra Film Awards	December 8, 2024	Best Voice Over Performance	Owen Teague	Nominated	
Astra Midseason Movie Awards	July 3, 2024	Best Picture	Kingdom of the Planet of the Apes	Nominated	
Austin Film Critics Association	January 6, 2025	Best Voice Acting/Animated/Digital Performance	Kevin Durand	Nominated	
British Academy Film Awards	February 16, 2025	Best Special Visual Effects	Erik Winquist, Rodney Burke, Paul Story, and Stephen Unterfranz	Nominated	
Critics Choice Awards	February 7, 2025	Best Visual Effects	Erik Winquist, Rodney Burke, Paul Story, and Stephen Unterfranz	Nominated	
Critics' Choice Super Awards	August 7, 2025	Best Science Fiction/Fantasy Movie	Kingdom of the Planet of the Apes	Nominated	
Golden Trailer Awards	May 30, 2024	Best Fantasy/Adventure	"Dream" (The Hive)	Nominated	
Golden Trailer Awards	May 30, 2024	Best Summer 2024 Blockbuster Trailer	"New Trust" (The Hive)	Nominated	
Hollywood Professional Association	November 7, 2024	Outstanding Visual Effects – Live Action Feature	Erik Winquist, Danielle Immerman, Stephen Unterfranz, Phillip Leonhardt, and Sean Noel Walker (Wētā FX)	Won	
Houston Film Critics Society	January 14, 2025	Best Visual Effects	Kingdom of the Planet of the Apes	Nominated	
International Film Music Critics Association	February 27, 2025	Best Original Score for a Fantasy/Science Fiction Film	John Paesano	Nominated	
Movieguide Awards	March 6, 2025	Best Movie for Mature Audiences	Kingdom of the Planet of the Apes	Nominated	
Online Film Critics Society	January 27, 2025	Best Visual Effects	Kingdom of the Planet of the Apes	Nominated	
San Diego Film Critics Society	December 9, 2024	Best Visual Effects	Kingdom of the Planet of the Apes	Runner-up (Note: Tied with Dune: Part Two (2024))	
Satellite Awards	January 26, 2025	Best Visual Effects	Erik Winquist, Rodney Burke, Paul Story, and Stephen Unterfranz	Nominated	
Saturn Awards	February 2, 2025	Best Science Fiction Film	Kingdom of the Planet of the Apes	Nominated	
Saturn Awards	February 2, 2025	Best Film Direction	Wes Ball	Nominated	
Saturn Awards	February 2, 2025	Best Supporting Actor in a Film	Owen Teague	Nominated	
Saturn Awards	February 2, 2025	Best Younger Performer in a Film	Freya Allan	Nominated	
Saturn Awards	February 2, 2025	Best Film Screenwriting	Josh Friedman	Nominated	
Saturn Awards	February 2, 2025	Best Film Music	John Paesano	Nominated	
Saturn Awards	February 2, 2025	Best Film Production Design	Daniel T. Dorrance	Nominated	
Saturn Awards	February 2, 2025	Best Film Visual / Special Effects	Erik Winquist, Rodney Burke, Paul Story, and Stephen Unterfranz	Nominated	
Seattle Film Critics Society	December 16, 2024	Best Visual Effects	Erik Winquist and Sean Noel Walker	Nominated	
St. Louis Film Critics Association	December 15, 2024	Best Visual Effects	Erik Winquist, Danielle Immerman, and Paul Story	Runner-up	
Visual Effects Society	February 11, 2025	Outstanding Visual Effects in a Photoreal Feature	Erik Winquist, Julia Neighly, Paul Story, Danielle Immerman, and Rodney Burke	Won	
Visual Effects Society	February 11, 2025	Outstanding Character in a Photoreal Feature	Rachael Dunk, Andrei Coval, John Sore, and Niels Peter Kaagaard (for "Noa")	Nominated	
Visual Effects Society	February 11, 2025	Outstanding Character in a Photoreal Feature	Seoungseok Charlie Kim, Giorgio Lafratta, Tim Teramoto, and Aidan Martin (for "Raka")	Nominated	
Visual Effects Society	February 11, 2025	Outstanding Effects Simulations in a Photoreal Feature	Alex Nowotny, Claude Schitter, Frédéric Valleur, and Kevin Kelm (for "Burning Village, Rapids, and Floods")	Nominated	
Visual Effects Society	February 11, 2025	Outstanding Compositing and Lighting in a Feature	Joerg Bruemmer, Zachary Brake, Tim Walker, and Kaustubh A. Patil	Nominated	
Visual Effects Society	February 11, 2025	Outstanding Virtual Cinematography in a CG Project	Dennis Yoo, Angelo Perrotta, Samantha Erickstad, and Miae Kang (for "Egg Climb")	Nominated	
Washington D.C. Area Film Critics Association	December 8, 2024	Best Motion Capture	Eka Darville	Nominated	
Washington D.C. Area Film Critics Association	December 8, 2024	Best Motion Capture	Kevin Durand	Nominated	
Washington D.C. Area Film Critics Association	December 8, 2024	Best Motion Capture	Peter Macon	Nominated	
Washington D.C. Area Film Critics Association	December 8, 2024	Best Motion Capture	Owen Teague	Won	

== Future ==
In June 2022, it was reported that Disney and 20th Century planned for Kingdom to be the first of a new trilogy of Planet of the Apes films. Wes Ball confirmed this in December 2023, explaining that the film had been conceived as the beginning of a trilogy that "fit into the legacy of" the previous three films. Rick Jaffa and Amanda Silver also expressed interest in making a third trilogy of films, thus bringing the total of the Planet of the Apes reboot series to nine films. In October 2024, 20th Century president Steve Asbell revealed that a new Apes film is in development for an expected 2027 release. In May 2026, it was reported that a new film would be directed by Matt Shakman and written by Josh Friedman, from an original story developed by the two, with Shakman, Jaffa, and Silver producing.
