= List of 2023 box office number-one films in Chile =

This is a list of films which placed number-one at the weekend box office in Chile during 2023. Amounts are in American dollars.

== Films ==
#	Weekend end date	Film	Box office	Openings in the top ten	Ref.
1	January 8, 2023	Avatar: The Way of Water	$1,317,942	M3GAN #3	
2	January 15, 2023	Avatar: The Way of Water	$957,838		
3	January 22, 2023	Avatar: The Way of Water	$651,671		
4	January 29, 2023	Avatar: The Way of Water	$523,121	Tár #4	
5	February 5, 2023	Puss in Boots: The Last Wish	$454,568	Knock at the Cabin #3, The Banshees of Inisherin #5	
6	February 12, 2023	Puss in Boots: The Last Wish	$354,379	Titanic #3, The Fabelmans #5	
7	February 19, 2023	Ant-Man and the Wasp: Quantumania	$1,404,017		
8	February 26, 2023	Ant-Man and the Wasp: Quantumania	$442,831	Women Talking #4	
9	March 5, 2023	Ant-Man and the Wasp: Quantumania	$273,035		
10	March 12, 2023	Ant-Man and the Wasp: Quantumania	$148,494		
11	March 19, 2023	The Whale	$158,684		
12	March 26, 2023	John Wick: Chapter 4	$631,022	Champions #5	
13	April 2, 2023	John Wick: Chapter 4	$496,990	Cocaine Bear #3	
14	April 9, 2023	The Super Mario Bros. Movie	$3,016,916		
15	April 16, 2023	The Super Mario Bros. Movie	$2,453,333		
16	April 23, 2023	The Super Mario Bros. Movie	$1,682,882		
17	April 30, 2023	The Super Mario Bros. Movie	$1,631,719	Renfield #3, Lifemark #5	
18	May 7, 2023	Guardians of the Galaxy Vol. 3	$1,489,477		
19	May 14, 2023	Guardians of the Galaxy Vol. 3	$1,054,778	Book Club: The Next Chapter #5	
20	May 21, 2023	Fast X	$2,235,065		
21	May 28, 2023	Fast X	$1,020,519	The Little Mermaid #2, About My Father #5	
22	June 4, 2023	Fast X	$607,456	The Boogeyman #4	
23	June 11, 2023	The Little Mermaid	$351,179		
24	June 18, 2023	The Little Mermaid	$175,811		
25	June 25, 2023	Elemental	$585,440		
26	July 2, 2023	Elemental	$577,599	Indiana Jones and the Dial of Destiny #2, Ruby Gillman: Teenage Kraken #3	
27	July 9, 2023	Elemental	$847,421		
28	July 16, 2023	Elemental	$826,927		
29	July 23, 2023	Oppenheimer	$1,023,289		
30	July 30, 2023	Oppenheimer	$829,748	Haunted Mansion #3, Joy Ride #6	
31	August 6, 2023	Oppenheimer	$541,967		
32	August 13, 2023	Oppenheimer	$392,600		
33	August 20, 2023	Oppenheimer	$229,261	Asteroid City #4	
34	August 27, 2023	Oppenheimer	$158,596	The Last Voyage of the Demeter #2	
35	September 3, 2023	Oppenheimer	$104,256		
36	September 10, 2023	Oppenheimer	$33,441		
37	September 17, 2023	A Haunting in Venice	$28,517		
38	September 24, 2023	Oppenheimer	$27,025		
39	October 1, 2023	PAW Patrol: The Mighty Movie	$320,000	Saw X #2, The Creator #3	
40	October 8, 2023	The Exorcist: Believer	$331,364		
41	October 15, 2023	The Exorcist: Believer	$171,735	Oldboy #5	
42	October 22, 2023	The Exorcist: Believer	$134,701		
43	October 29, 2023	Five Nights at Freddy's	$1,808,716	Trolls Band Together #2	
44	November 5, 2023	Five Nights at Freddy's	$616,548		
45	November 12, 2023	The Marvels	$393,552		
46	November 19, 2023	The Hunger Games: The Ballad of Songbirds & Snakes	$467,277		
47	November 26, 2023	Five Nights at Freddy's	$91,037		
48	December 3, 2023	Five Nights at Freddy's	$77,186		
49	December 10, 2023	The Hunger Games: The Ballad of Songbirds & Snakes	$120,530		
50	December 17, 2023	Migration	$109,752		
51	December 24, 2023	Migration	$57,058		
52	December 31, 2023	Migration	$89,026		

Preceded by 2022 Box office number-one films	Box office number-one films 2023	Succeeded by 2024 Box office number-one films
