= Erik Winquist =

American-New Zealander visual effects supervisor

- Born: January 2, 1975 (age 51); Evanston, Illinois, USA
- Occupation: Visual effects supervisor
- Years active: 1998-present

Erik Winquist (born January 2, 1975) is an American New Zealander visual effects supervisor. He is best known for his work on three prominent film franchises featuring large computer generated animal effects: Peter Jackson's King Kong (2005), Planet of the Apes reboot films, and Rampage (2018).

Erik Winquist was nominated at the 87th Academy Awards in the category of Best Visual Effects. He was nominated for an Academy Award, along with Daniel Barrett, Dan Lemmon and Joe Letteri, for the film Dawn of the Planet of the Apes. They led a team of roughly 850 people who designed and created all the apes, the digital set extensions, environments, and the effects for the film. Winquist handled pre-production and second-unit photography.

He also received a BAFTA nomination for Dawn of the Planet of the Apes in the same year.
