= Giselle (Enchanted) =

- Enchanted character
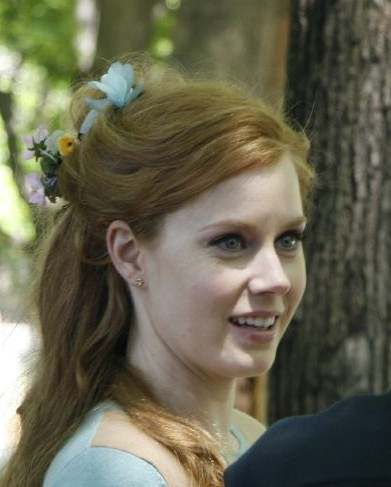
- Amy Adams in costume as Giselle on the set of Enchanted
- First appearance: Enchanted (2007)
- Created by: Bill Kelly (writer); Kevin Lima (director)
- Portrayed by: Amy Adams

In-universe information
- Family: Morgan Philip (stepdaughter); Sophia Philip (daughter)
- Spouse: Robert Philip
- Significant other: Prince Edward (former fiancé)

Giselle is a fictional character from Disney's romantic comedy fantasy film Enchanted (2007) and its sequel, Disenchanted (2022). She is both portrayed and voiced by actress Amy Adams. The character first appears in Enchanted as a cheerful maiden from the animated kingdom of Andalasia, whose plans to marry its prince are threatened when an evil queen banishes her to New York City. While trapped there, she meets and charms a cynical divorce lawyer, which complicates her feelings for the Andalasian prince to whom she is already engaged.

Created by screenwriter Bill Kelly and director Kevin Lima, Giselle is both a parody of and homage to classic Disney princess characters, specifically borrowing inspiration from Snow White, Cinderella, Aurora, and Ariel. Adams was selected out of approximately 300 actresses who auditioned for the role. Although Lima had always wanted to cast an unknown performer as Giselle, Disney executives were initially hesitant to hire Adams due to her relative obscurity at the time. Giselle's animated sequences were supervised by veteran Disney animator James Baxter, who referenced live-action footage of Adams to ensure the character was a cohesive combination of Adams and the classic Disney princess aesthetic.

Adams' performance was lauded by film critics, who praised her comedic timing, singing, and commitment to the character. Adams was nominated for a Golden Globe Award for Best Actress – Motion Picture Comedy or Musical, and the role is credited with establishing her as a leading lady in Hollywood. Some publications credit Giselle with reviving Disney's princess films following a period of decline. Due to disagreements over compensating Adams for using her likeness, Disney canceled its initial plans to induct Giselle into the Disney Princess franchise.

== Role ==
Giselle (Amy Adams), a young woman from the animated kingdom of Andalasia, has long fantasized about marrying her true love. She quickly becomes engaged to Prince Edward (James Marsden), but their marriage plans are jeopardized by Edward's stepmother, Queen Narissa (Susan Sarandon). Viewing Giselle as a threat to her throne, Narissa pushes her down a wishing well, transporting her to contemporary Manhattan, New York City. Disoriented and homeless in an unfamiliar environment, Giselle meets Robert (Patrick Dempsey), a disillusioned divorce lawyer and single father to Morgan (Rachel Covey). Reluctantly, Robert allows Giselle to stay in their apartment, straining his relationship with his fiancé, Nancy (Idina Menzel). As Giselle explores New York, Edward pursues her, determined to bring her back to Andalasia. Meanwhile, Narissa's henchman, Nathaniel (Timothy Spall), plots to sabotage Edward's mission by poisoning Giselle.

Despite her devotion to Edward, Giselle begins to develop feelings for Robert, and Robert is softened by Giselle's optimism in return. Meanwhile, the real world begins to transform Giselle into a complex human being. When Edward finally locates Giselle, she pleads to spend their last night in New York attending a costume ball, during which Giselle shares a romantic dance with Robert. Their moment is interrupted by Narissa who, disguised as an old woman, offers Giselle a magic apple promising that it will erase all memories of her time in New York so she can move on with Edward. However, the apple poisons her and Giselle falls into a deep sleep. Edward and Nathaniel intervene before Narissa can drag Giselle away. Robert deduces the spell can only be broken by true love's kiss. When Edward's kiss fails to awaken her, he quickly realizes Giselle's true love must be Robert instead. With Edward and Nancy's blessing, Robert kisses Giselle and she is revived. Enraged, Narissa transforms herself into a dragon and kidnaps Robert, dangling him from the top of the Woolworth Building. Giselle pursues them and catches Robert as Narissa falls to her death. In the end, Giselle chooses to stay in New York with Robert and Morgan, and launches her own princess-themed clothing line called "Andalasia Fashions", while Edward returns to Andalasia with Nancy, where they marry each other.

In the sequel Disenchanted, set 10 years later, Giselle moves with Robert, her now-teenage stepdaughter Morgan (Gabriella Baldacchino), and their newborn daughter, Sophia, to the seemingly idyllic suburban town of Monroeville. Giselle hopes to achieve a more ideal life than what she has been experiencing in New York City since marrying Robert, but still struggles to adapt to her new environment, finding herself at odds with Morgan and the town's "queen bee", Malvina Monroe (Maya Rudolph). Desperate for change, Giselle uses Sophia's wishing wand to wish for a "fairytale life", but starts transforming into Morgan's wicked stepmother instead, essentially becoming the villain in her own fairy tale. Giselle discovers that her wish is draining all magic from Andalasia to turn Monroeville into a fairy tale. If not reversed by midnight, the transformation becomes permanent, resulting in the disappearance of Andalasia and its inhabitants, including Giselle. Using the last of her innocence before completely transforming, Giselle sends Morgan to Andalasia, where Nancy and Edward teach her to harness her memories of Giselle to restore her stepmother's true nature. Morgan's drawing breaks the spell's effects on Giselle, but Malvina captures Morgan and demands the wand in exchange for her release. Giselle complies, but as midnight approaches, she weakens and begins to disappear. However, Giselle reminds Morgan that she can use the wand's magic as the daughter of an Andalasian. Morgan wishes to be home with her mother, breaking the spell and bringing Giselle, Monroeville, and Andalasia back to life. Only Giselle and Morgan remember the events of the previous day, while everyone else believes it was just a dream.

== Development ==
=== Creation ===
In an original draft of the story, the film's heroine asks to be sent to the "real world" to escape unrequited advances from a Prince Charming-type character. When Disney acquired the original script for Enchanted, the film had been intended for a much older audience. Screenwriter Bill Kelly had written a scene in which Giselle is mistaken for a stripper upon arriving in New York's red-light district. She is hired for a bachelor party, whose attendees become angry with her once she refuses to strip, prompting Robert to cancel the party and rescue her. Executive producer Doug Short claims the bachelor party was not abandoned exclusively because of its mature tone, but rather the removal of Robert's friends naturally allowed the story to prioritize Giselle and Robert's relationship. By 2005, Disney commissioned Kelly to write a new draft that aligned with the studio's tradition of yearning heroines. Director Kevin Lima revised the script with Kelly to have Giselle arrive in Times Square, and the bachelor party was ultimately replaced with Giselle hanging from a castle-shaped billboard, where she meets Robert for the first time.

Short said the hardest part of developing Giselle as a character was establishing a balance between her comedic antics and relatability, without simply making her a "fool" or evolving her at the expense of her happy personality. Because she is a parody of and homage to classic Disney princess tropes, the filmmakers borrowed inspiration from several Disney princesses, with Lima describing Giselle as "80% Snow White" with traits of Cinderella and Aurora, combined with Ariel's spunk. Caroline Siede of The A.V. Club observed that the original three lend themselves more easily to parody as "the least progressive Disney princess films", whereas Ariel represents a transition towards more empowered heroines. Lima noted Giselle's distinguishing trait is that while her predecessors are largely reactive, Enchanted's contemporary setting forces Giselle to become an active participant in her own fairy tale and rely on her innate ability to adapt to new situations in order to survive unfamiliar circumstances. Kelly identified Giselle as his favorite character to write for.

Producer Barry Josephson described Lima, a former Disney animator, as an expert on Disney's princess characters, which he credited with helping develop Giselle. Similarly, Short credits Lima with establishing the proper tone for Giselle's evolution, without resorting to simply making fun of Disney's princess culture. According to Adams, her character's journey is about discovering genuine human emotions and love: "She finds out that life is more complicated than it has appeared so far in her life and that it is not all about happy endings, but can be very exciting”. A significant moment in Giselle's character development is when she experiences the feeling of anger for the first time during an argument with Robert, while noticing his chest hair, a feature typically omitted from animated characters. Some of the creative team heavily debated whether the film warranted a final battle, but Short ultimately decided the moment was needed to complete Giselle's transformation into someone who no longer needs to be rescued. Lima explained that the ending provides a more "contemporarily responsible story" for Giselle, unlike traditional female characters who appear independent until they are rescued at the end of their films. Despite some objection from fans, Lima maintained that separating Giselle from Edward at the end was needed to finalize her growth.

=== Casting and portrayal ===
Adam Shankman was one of the early directors attached to the film before Lima; Shankman had expressed interest in offering the lead role to Kate Hudson or Reese Witherspoon. Established actresses such as Cameron Diaz, Renée Zellweger, Jennifer Garner, and Christina Aguilera had also been considered, but Lima specifically wanted an unknown actress so audiences would not be distracted by her public image, in turn maintaining the illusion of the character's otherworldly innocence. Approximately 300 actresses auditioned, for which Adams answered a cattle call that required singing, acting, and dancing. By the time Adams auditioned in 2005, Lima had already interviewed 250 candidates, and had begun doubting he would find the right actress. However, Lima was immediately impressed by her audition, believing she looked like a Disney princess, and described her as the only auditionee capable of inhabiting the role sincerely without mocking the character. Although she was his only choice, Disney was initially hesitant to hire the relatively unknown Adams because they believed they needed an established star to attract audiences. (Note: The film Junebug (2005), for which Adams was nominated for an Academy Award for Best Supporting Actress, had not yet been released when she was cast in Enchanted.) Disney chairman Dick Cook relented upon seeing her screen test, while Josephson said Adams demonstrated the emotional range required for the role. Lima likened hiring Adams to Disney introducing the world to Julie Andrews in Mary Poppins (1964). (Note: Actress Julie Andrews was cast as the voice of the film's narrator, a reference to her past work for Disney.) To appease the studio for casting a lesser-known, Lima offered to hire more established actors such as Patrick Dempsey in supporting roles.

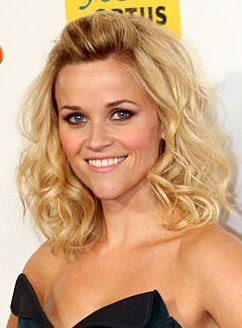
Actress Reese Witherspoon (pictured) was one of several actresses considered for the role of Giselle before Amy Adams was cast.

Giselle was Adams' first leading role, to which she was attracted because of the character's kindness and opportunity for her younger relatives to see her in a family-friendly film. She envisioned Giselle as a strong character despite her sweet nature, explaining that her innocence stems from inexperience as opposed to weakness, and strove to preserve her kindness as she becomes more worldly and mature. Since Enchanted was not filmed in chronological order, Adams paid particularly close attention to making sure her character's personality and physicality were accurate to each time period. She did not intentionally study Disney films to prepare for the role because she had watched them constantly growing up, and wanted to avoid imitating any specific princess in favor of creating her own. At age 19, Adams had unsuccessfully auditioned to play a princess at one of Disney's theme parks. Despite the character being a princess, Adams said she treated Giselle as seriously as she would have any other role, but felt an additional sense of responsibility to maintain a positive image as a potential role model for young girls.

Since the film is a musical, Adams was determined to not have her singing dubbed by another performer and underwent intensive vocal coaching to perform all of her character's songs. She recorded three of the film's original songs for its soundtrack, and listened to earlier Disney princesses to achieve a soft, lilting tone. Despite her musical theatre background, she described the musical, romance, and action scenes as the most challenging to film because she relied on her imagination to interact with animated and CGI elements. Adams worked with some live rats and birds to film "Happy Working Song", but refused to film with cockroaches. She took ballroom dance lessons with Dempsey to prepare for the film's ballroom sequence, and found it difficult to learn to dance with a partner despite being a trained dancer herself.

Giselle's costumes were designed by Mona May. The character begins Enchanted wearing traditional Disney princess attire; her outfits gradually become more modern the longer she remains in New York, to mirror her evolution from an animated princess into a "real woman". Her most elaborate costume, the wedding dress, proved challenging for Adams to move or sit down in due to its material and 45-pound weight. May designed the gown based on Lima's instructions to deliver a distinct contrast to the film's hand-drawn scenes, sewing several layers of petticoats into the dress to make it appear as large as possible. Adams fell under its weight several times, but credits it with helping inform how Giselle would move on camera. Her first costume change in New York is a dress made from blue curtains with an empire waist and cap sleeves, which May said allows her to move much more freely in New York City, despite still being "very much of a princess look". Giselle's transformation into a modern woman and decision to remain human towards the film's climax culminates in a form-fitting gray-lavender evening gown devoid of "poofiness and silliness", the design of which May intentionally kept secret from the audience. She designed the gown to appear as though she could have purchased it from a department store, and based it on dresses worn by actress Ginger Rogers during the 1930s and concept art of different Disney princesses.

=== Design and animation ===
Earliest versions of the script did not include any animated sequences, which the filmmakers decided to incorporate after they realized they would be introducing Disney fans to a new Disney princess for the first time in several years. Short suggested a traditionally animated opening in the vein of Disney's earliest princess films as opposed to a computer-animated introduction, to remind viewers that Giselle is not a contemporary Disney princess, therefore he felt it would not have made sense for her to be CGI. To establish the environment, Lima wanted the animated characters to appear round, curvy and flower-like, devoid of the straight lines present in New York. Character designer Harald Siepermann drew direct inspiration from the work of artists Alphonse Mucha and Maxfield Parrish for elements such as Giselle's hair, which was drawn to resemble ocean waves. Siepermann used elements of Romanticism and Art Nouveau for Giselle's long, flowing hair and slim dress, which would contrast the large wedding dress she dons later in the film. Siepermann also borrowed inspiration for Giselle's design from Czechoslovak television adaptations of fairy tales. Both Giselle and Edward's outfits feature puffy shoulders to establish a connection between the love interests.

The animated version of Giselle was animated by James Baxter, who supervised all of the film's animated sequences. He had previously been a supervising animator for Belle on Beauty and the Beast (1991), in addition to working on several other Disney films before migrating to rival studioDreamWorks Animation by the time he was hired for Enchanted. Baxter envisioned Giselle as a hybrid of Adams and classic Disney princesses, and referenced classic Disney films to ensure she was unique despite resembling an archetypical Disney heroine. Giselle's mannerisms and Adams' vocal inflections were mostly based on Snow White. Baxter worked on the character primarily with fellow Disney animators Mark Henn and Robert Domingo. Henn was known for having previously animated several of Disney's leading ladies.

Adams provided live-action reference by posing and acting out some of her character's animated scenes, allowing the animators to borrow some of her mannerisms and characteristics, although she felt intimidated by the thinness of her animated counterpart's waist compared to her own. To prevent the character from devolving into caricature, Lima shot footage of Adams performing some of Giselle's animated scenes and shared them with the animators to show how Giselle translated to the real world. Specifically, Adams filmed the animated scene in which Giselle arrives for her wedding as though they were shooting a film. Meanwhile, Lima shared some of Baxter's animation tests with Adams, which helped her develop a way of appearing as though she was floating instead of walking. Baxter also visited the live-action set to watch Adams work.

=== Disenchanted ===
Adams confirmed that an Enchanted sequel was in her acting contract as early as 2007, with a follow-up film being developed since 2010. In 2016, The Guardian reported that the sequel would focus on Giselle questioning the happy ending she achieved in the first film, and unintentionally upending everyone's lives in the process. The sequel, eventually named Disenchanted, remained in development for several years, until production began in 2021. Director Adam Shankman said the idea finally materialized once Adams' involvement was confirmed and they decided the main plot should focus on Giselle realizing she is now the stepmother of own fairy tale, raising a growing stepdaughter disinterested in magic. Adams also served as a producer on the project. Released in 2022, 15 years after the original, Adams said Disenchanted explores Giselle accepting that she is no longer the ingenue she once was.

Due to aging, Adams worked hard to replicate the lighter singing voice associated with her character. The actress said the sequel's version of Giselle retains her magical qualities from the original film, but has obviously "lived in this world now for a period of time". According to Shankman, Giselle is no longer the story's fish out of water, which becomes a role now served by her peers. Adams wanted to continue the character 10 years removed from where she evolved by the end of Enchanted, without compromising the "joy, naïveté, innocence and purity that makes Giselle so special". The film's costumes were designed by Joan Bergin, who said Giselle's wardrobe morphs from "day clothes" that "have a little edge all the time", to "spectacular" once she adopts a split personality in her villainous form.

== Reception ==
=== Critical response ===
Adams received widespread acclaim for her performance, with film critics praising her comedic timing and singing. Joe Morgenstern and Christy Lemire were among journalists who declared her work in Enchanted a star-making performance. Comparing her comedic timing to actresses Judy Holliday and Goldie Hawn, The Daily Telegraph's David Gritten said Adams boasts potential to become "a great screen comedienne, while Dana Stevens of Slate and Olly Richards of Empire said she delivered one of the best comic performances of 2007. Michael Shnayerson said Adams established herself as a triple threat reminiscent of Rita Hayworth and Ginger Rogers. Frederica Mathewes-Green said she "couldn't be better in this role". Tricia Olszewski of the Washington City Paper compared her performance to her work in Junebug (2005), saying she "once again does an excellent job portraying a young woman whose smarts peep through her gee-gollyness". John Beifuss of The Commercial Appeal predicted young girls "will fall for her as if she were their dream big sister". Anvita Singh of The Indian Express and James Berardinelli agreed that Adams is the film's highlight. Several critics positively compared her performance to the work of Julie Andrews, with Matt Brunson of Creative Loafing describing her as "practically perfect in every way", (Note: As famously spoken by Julie Andrews as the title character in Mary Poppins.) and Peter Howell of the Toronto Star calling her "a most worthy successor".

Many reviewers, such as Peter Rainer of The Christian Science Monitor, commended Adams for grounding her character's cheeriness with sincerity and authenticity. ABC News praised Adams for embodying a Disney princess without resorting to caricature. Kenneth Turan said Adams "never overdoes the earnestness or even hints at condescending to the role, and it is impossible to think of Enchanted without her". According to Alex Fletcher of Digital Spy, her performance saved Giselle from devolving into a "sickly centre-piece". Naomi West of The Daily Telegraph wrote "Giselle could so easily be irritating ... But in Adams's hands she is disarming, her journey from a 2D animated character in the film's first minutes to one who feels three-dimensional emotions – anger, attraction – is genuinely engaging". In a review for The Sydney Morning Herald, Sandra Hall said she "achieves precisely the right degree of wide-eyed wonder as Giselle and, even more importantly, sustains it". Maitland McDonagh said the actress "manages to make Giselle's relentless optimism seem charming rather than a sign of mental deficiency". Both Kit Bowen of Hollywood.com and Phil Villarreal of the Arizona Daily Star agreed that Adams does her best work when her character starts evolving to become more human, believing the performance could potentially earn her a second Academy Award nomination.

Critics who were less impressed with Enchanted complimented Adams regardless. According to Ken Hanke, head film critic for the Mountain Xpress, Enchanted offers "five-stars worth of Amy Adams in four-stars worth of movie". Writing for the Watertown Daily Times, Adam Tobias declared her the only enchanting part of Enchanted, while both Christopher Borelli of The Blade and Kim Brown of the Tulsa World called her the sole reason to watch it. News & Review's Jim Lane and Brooke Holgerson of the Boston Phoenix felt the film relies heavily on Adams' charm. Peter Bradshaw said "she's the only decent thing in this overhyped family movie". Kirk Honeycutt of Reuters felt Adams was the only cast member the film used properly.

In a rare mixed review, Joshua Starnes of ComingSoon.net found Adams bland and saccharine. Dorothy Woodend of The Tyee accused Giselle of being too infantilized, describing her as having "all the mannerisms of a demented eight-year-old". Writing for Christianity Today, Todd Hertz felt the film's ending and messages weakened Giselle's character arc, who he described as initially "a strong woman, dynamic character, and great role model". Regardless, he praised Adams' performance and predicted Giselle "will become quite popular in Disney lore". Amy Biancolli of the Houston Chronicle criticized Giselle's transformation for being reliant on shopping. As for Disenchanted, Adams' performance was generally praised despite the sequel itself receiving mixed reviews.

=== Accolades ===
Entertainment Weekly ranked Adams' performance among the best of 2007. Several journalists found Adams' work in Enchanted to be deserving of an Academy Award nomination, but Martin A. Grove of The Associated Press felt a nomination would be unlikely due to the Academy of Motion Picture Arts and Sciences' history of rarely awarding comedic acting performances. Grove predicted that Adams was more likely to receive a Golden Globe Award nomination for Best Actress – Motion Picture Comedy or Musical, which became the first Golden Globe nomination of her career. Despite not receiving an Academy Award nomination for Enchanted, Adams performed "Happy Working Song" – one of the film's three Oscar-nominated songs – live at the 80th Academy Awards in 2008. In retrospective reviews, some publications have called Adams' lack of nomination for Enchanted a snub. Adams won the Saturn Award for Best Actress at the 34th Saturn Awards.

The success of Enchanted established Adams as a bankable star in Hollywood. Some critics such as Jeff Vice of the Deseret News consider the performance to be her breakout role, despite her previous film success. According to Beth Wood of The San Diego Union-Tribune, the role is arguably Adams' most famous, and established her career trajectory of playing mostly young, naive women.

== Impact and legacy ==
Several journalists have analyzed the character's marketability as a princess character owned by Disney, with Entertainment Weekly's Lisa Schwarzbaum describing her as "specifically engineered to become a 'Disney Princess' superstar". In the weeks leading up to the film's release, Steve Daly of Entertainment Weekly anticipated that Giselle would become an endless presence at Disney theme parks, expecting the character to be used heavily in Disney's merchandising and tie-in products. Similarly, The Orange County Register's Barry Koltnow noted that, in addition to being featured heavily in Disney's marketing campaign for Enchanted, Adams' character "will no doubt be portrayed by costumed performers at Disney theme parks for years to come", followed by toys, dolls, and possible sequels. Adams said she did not understand the true impact of playing a Disney princess until encountering paparazzi while promoting the film in Europe, who she mistook for Disney's hired photographers.

According to Melissa Marr of The Wall Street Journal, some Disney creatives reported that Enchanted had been exclusively created with the intention of integrating a new princess into the studio's Disney Princess franchise. Following the critical and commercial success of Enchanted, Disney confirmed that Giselle would be inducted into the Disney Princess lineup as an official member and merchandised accordingly, creating their first fashion doll directly based on the appearance of a real person. However, Disney canceled these plans due to the cost of using Adams' likeness in their merchandising. The company continued selling Giselle dolls and dresses that had already been manufactured, but only advertised the animated version of the character in their tie-in products, such as the Enchanted video game. Some critics and fans consider Giselle to be an honorary or "unofficial" Disney Princess, despite her exclusion from the franchise. A writer for MovieWeb described her as one of Disney's most successful female characters who lack a "princess" title. In 2022, Sydney Bucksbaum of Entertainment Weekly dubbed her the studio's "first live-action Disney princess", despite not being a member of the franchise. Giselle debuted as a cast member at Disney-MGM Studios' Hollywood Holly-Day Parade in November 2007. In November 2007, May reported to California Apparel News that the character was expected to appear at Disneyland and Walt Disney World wearing a version of the wedding dress she had designed for the film. She has made several parade appearances, but has yet to appear as an official meet and greet character at any Disney theme parks, which some researchers attributed to her resemblance to Adams.

Giselle debuted during a period when Disney had virtually stopped producing princess-themed films due to diminishing returns. Writing for Collider, Elisa Guimarães credits Enchanted with "bringing Disney princesses back to the screens and making them what they are today". According to Caroline Siede of The A.V. Club, the success of "Enchanted helped revitalize interest in the Disney princess genre", eventually leading to successful princess films such as Disney's Frozen (2013) and Moana (2016). Siede wrote that Giselle's positive influence on Robert and other Enchanted characters delivers a strong argument for appreciating the value of even the most archetypal Disney princesses. According to Tori Brazier of Metro, the character was the first time Disney was willing to mock the princess tropes they had become synonymous with. Olly Richards of Empire noted that Giselle delivered "a kick up the bustled butt and a good shot of cynicism" to Disney's roster of earnest heroines, prior to which the studio rarely made jokes at their own expense. Ellen Walker of Polygon said Disney's satirical yet loving treatment of Giselle greatly influenced how they would use comedy in subsequent films and compete with DreamWorks' Shrek franchise. Simon Brew of Den of Geek believes Giselle introduced a more progressive version of Disney heroines several years before Brave (2012) and Frozen. Maddie Davis of Comic Book Resources called Giselle a feminist role model, believing she provided "a blueprint for strong femme-presenting fairytale characters". Guimarães noted that Giselle's successors began addressing common Disney tropes such as love at first sight and animal sidekicks with similar metatextual humor, namely in The Princess and the Frog (2009), Tangled (2010), Frozen and Moana.
