= Disenchanted (film) =

2022 film directed by Adam Shankman

- Official release poster
- Directed by: Adam Shankman
- Screenplay by: Brigitte Hales
- Story by: J. David Stem; David N. Weiss; Richard LaGravenese
- Based on: Characters by Bill Kelly
- Produced by: Barry Josephson; Barry Sonnenfeld; Amy Adams
- Starring: Amy Adams; Patrick Dempsey; Griffin Newman; Maya Rudolph; Yvette Nicole Brown; Jayma Mays; Gabriella Baldacchino; Idina Menzel; James Marsden
- Cinematography: Simon Duggan
- Edited by: Emma E. Hickox; Chris Lebenzon
- Music by: Alan Menken
- Production companies: Walt Disney Pictures; Josephson Entertainment; Right Coast Productions; Andalasia Productions
- Distributed by: Disney+ (United States); Walt Disney Studios Motion Pictures (International)
- Release dates: November 16, 2022 (El Capitan Theatre); November 18, 2022 (United States)
- Running time: 119 minutes
- Country: United States
- Language: English

Disenchanted is a 2022 American live-action/animated musical fantasy drama film directed by Adam Shankman and written by Brigitte Hales, based on a story by Richard LaGravenese and the writing team of J. David Stem and David N. Weiss. Co-produced by Walt Disney Pictures, Josephson Entertainment, and Right Coast Productions, it is the sequel to the 2007 film Enchanted.

Amy Adams, Patrick Dempsey, James Marsden, and Idina Menzel reprise their roles from the first film, with newcomer Gabriella Baldacchino taking over for Rachel Covey (who makes a cameo as a different character). New cast members include Maya Rudolph, Yvette Nicole Brown, Jayma Mays, Kolton Stewart, Oscar Nunez, and Griffin Newman. Alan Menken and Stephen Schwartz return as the film's songwriters, while Menken also composed the score. Adams also served as a producer of the film alongside Barry Josephson and Barry Sonnenfeld.

Talks of an Enchanted sequel began in early 2010, but the project languished in development hell for several years. By 2017, it was announced Adams had signed on to reprise her role and filming was set to begin that summer, but it never came to fruition. The film was officially announced in December 2020, with the cast joining in spring 2021 and filming taking place in Ireland between May and July that year.

Disenchanted premiered at the El Capitan Theatre in Los Angeles on November 16, 2022, and was released in the United States via Disney+ on November 18. Unlike its predecessor, the film received negative reviews from critics who, despite praising Adams's performance, felt it lacked the charm and humor of the original.

== Plot ==
Approximately 10 years after the first film, Giselle and Robert Philip are living happily together with their two daughters — infant Sofia and teenage Morgan, Robert's daughter from his previous marriage. Dissatisfied with life in Manhattan, Giselle plans to move the family to the suburban town of Monroeville. However, this seems to create new problems when their new house is in need of renovations, Robert must commute to continue his job, and Morgan feels like an outcast at her new school.

King Edward and Queen Nancy visit from Andalasia via a well from the house's backyard. As Sofia's godparents, they present her with a wish-granting wand. Giselle meets Malvina Monroe, the arrogant head of the town council, who is hosting a fairy tale-themed ball with her son Tyson as the elected prince. Giselle tries to get Morgan elected princess but inadvertently embarrasses her, causing a furious Morgan to disown her as her mother.

After consulting with her chipmunk friend Pip, Giselle uses the wand to wish her family's life to be a "perfect fairy tale". The next day, the town has transformed into a fantasy kingdom called Monrolasia. Morgan is now content with their new life, Robert believes himself to be a brave adventurer, and Malvina is an evil queen with magical powers. Giselle, however, discovers uncharacteristically haughty behavior and finds pleasure in mistreating Morgan. Realizing she is slowly becoming a wicked stepmother, she consults the wand's instruction scroll for help. The scroll reveals Andalasia's magic is being used to transform the real world into a fairy tale, which will become permanent after midnight.

Malvina learns about the wand and enlists her servants Rosaleen and Ruby to steal it. However, the scroll states that the wand can only be used by a "true Andalasian". Giselle realizes that without the wand, she will lose herself to her wicked side, so she convinces Morgan to save them before sending her to Andalasia through the well.

Morgan learns that Andalsia's magic is transported to Monrolasia through a vortex and once the spell becomes permanent, Andalasia will disappear forever. Nancy and Edward suggest she use the magic of their memories to remind Giselle of her true self. Morgan lets the magic imbue itself onto her childhood drawing of their family tree with pictures of their shared memories, then heads back to the real world with Nancy.

Now under the influence of her evil personality, Giselle challenges Malvina for the royal title of Monrolasia. She sends Pip, who has been turned into a tabby cat, to steal back the wand while also sending Robert on an assumed futile search for Morgan. At the ball, Giselle and Malvina engage in a magic duel with the former easily overpowering the latter due to possessing the wand. Morgan and Nancy meet up with Robert and Tyson before rushing into the town hall to stop the duel. Morgan tosses her drawing to Giselle who rips it, but the magic within brings the memories to life, restoring Giselle to normal.

Not wanting the spell to be broken, Malvina takes Morgan hostage and demands the wand in exchange which Giselle surrenders. As midnight approaches, everything from Andalasia begins to disappear including Giselle herself. While Robert and Tyson head to the top of the clock tower to delay the final chime, Giselle tells Morgan that by being her daughter, she is a true Andalasian, therefore capable of using the wand. Morgan wishes she were home with her mother just as Malvina attempts to make the clock tower chime before it is destroyed.

Morgan awakens in their house and finds everything normal again; the spell has been broken. Only she and Giselle are aware of the events, while everyone else believes it to be a dream. Giselle apologizes to Malvina for stepping over her plans and Malvina allows her to join the town council. Some time later, Robert has started his own practice in Monroeville, Morgan and Tyson have started dating, and Nancy and Edward arrive for another visit to the Philips in their now happy life.

== Cast ==
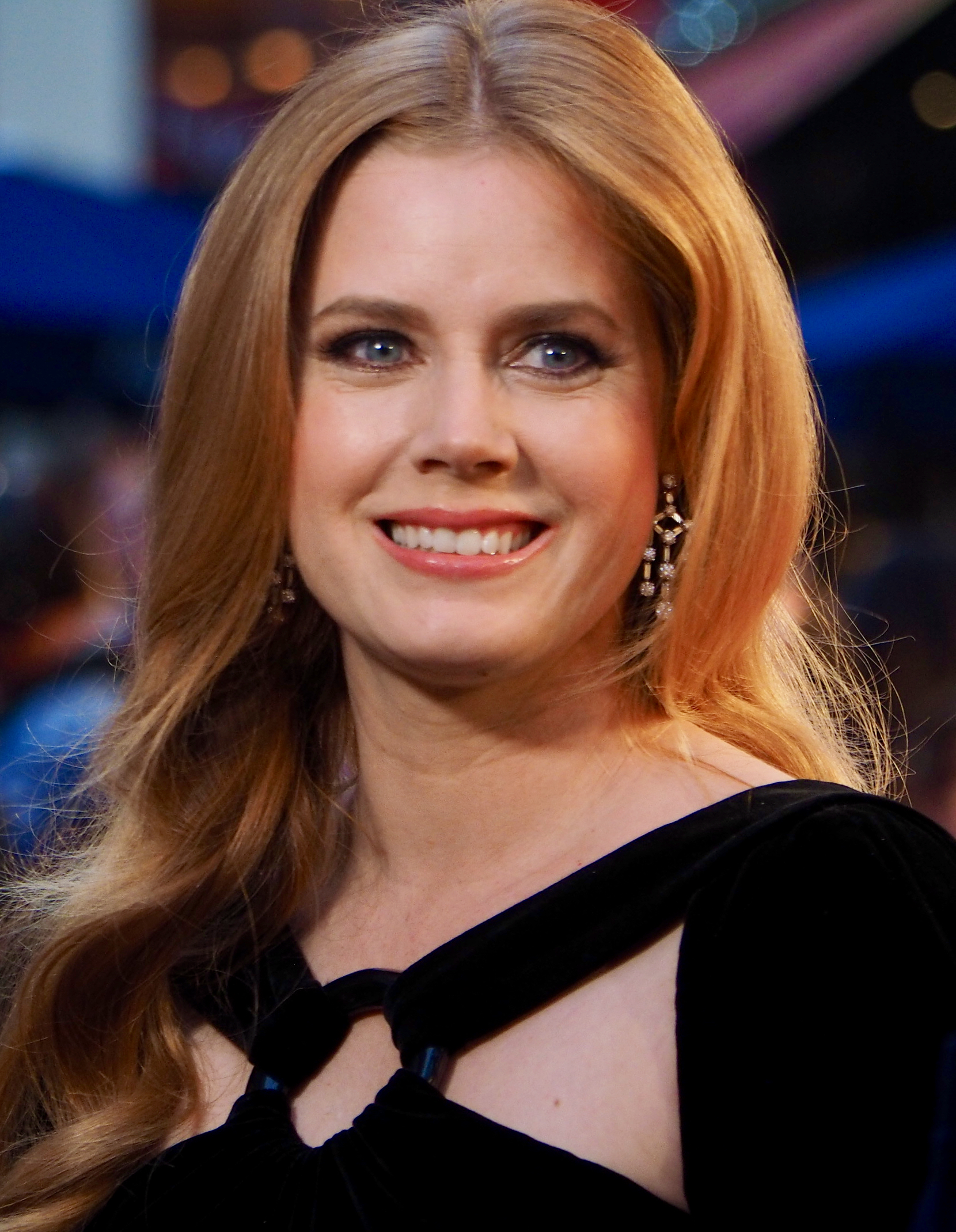
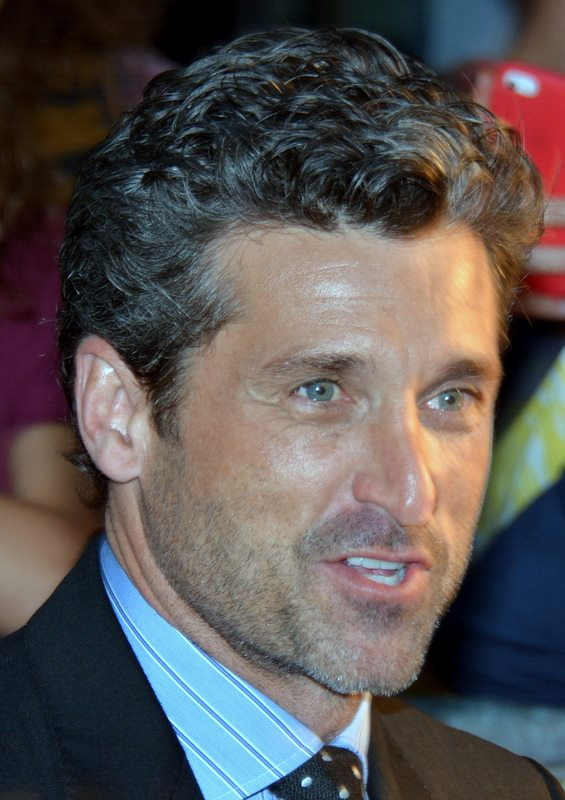
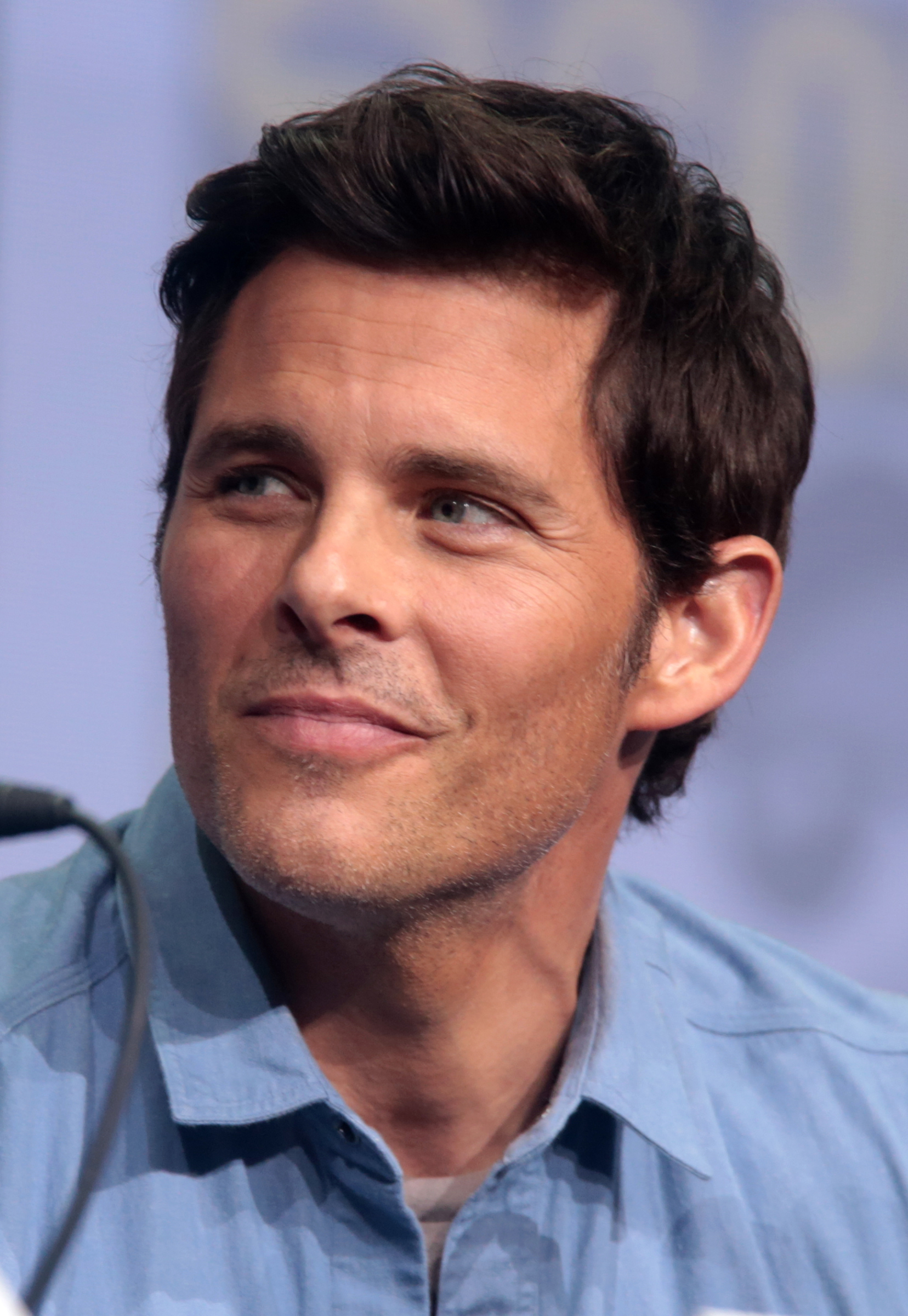
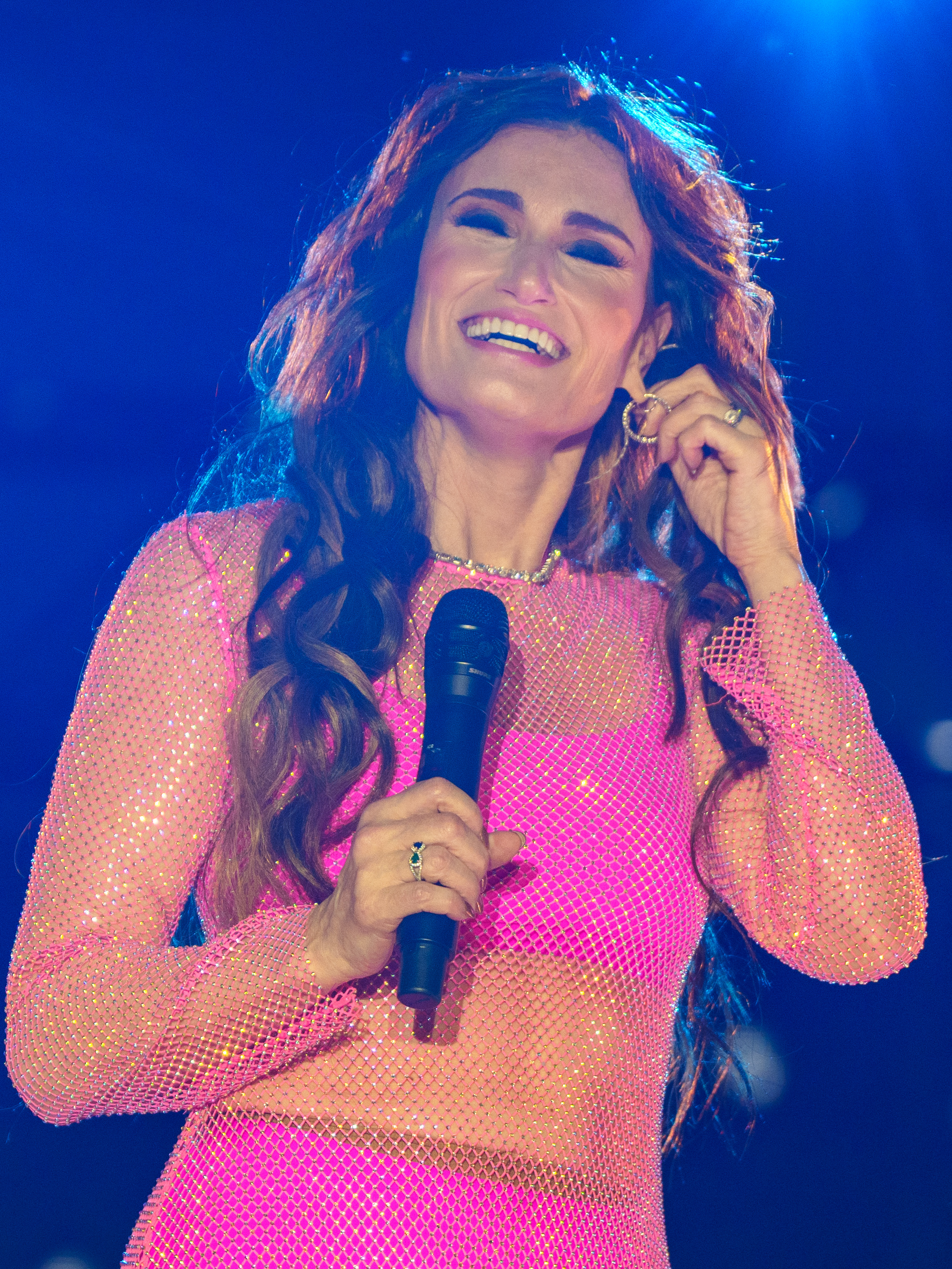
Amy Adams (top left), Patrick Dempsey, James Marsden and Idina Menzel all returned to reprise their roles as Giselle, Robert, King Edward and Nancy, respectively.
- Amy Adams as Giselle Philip/"Stepmother", Robert's wife, Morgan's stepmother and Sofia's mother. Her Monrolasia counterpart has her slowly becoming like the wicked stepmother from Cinderella.
- Patrick Dempsey as Robert Philip/"Knight", a lawyer who is Giselle's husband and Morgan's and Sofia's father. His Monrolasia counterpart works as a knight.
- Maya Rudolph as Malvina Monroe/"Evil Queen", a realtor and the snooty head of Monroeville's town council. Her Monrolasia counterpart is similar to the Evil Queen.
- Yvette Nicole Brown as Rosaleen/"Minion #1", a sensible woman who is one of Malvina's assistants. Her Monrolasia counterpart works for Queen Malvina.
- Jayma Mays as Ruby/"Minion #2", a dimwitted woman who is one of Malvina's assistants. Her Monrolasia counterpart works for Queen Malvina.
- Gabriella Baldacchino as Morgan Philip/"Stepdaughter", Robert's 16-year-old daughter, Sofia's older half-sister and Giselle's stepdaughter. Baldacchino replaced Rachel Covey, who originally played Morgan in the first film.
- Idina Menzel as Nancy Tremaine, Edward's wife and Queen of Andalasia.
- James Marsden as Edward, Nancy's husband and King of Andalasia.
- Oscar Nunez appears as Edgar/"Magic Mirror", a barista and Malvina's informant whose Monrolasia counterpart is a Magic Mirror that Queen Malvina owns.
- Kolton Stewart as Tyson Monroe/"Prince", Malvina's son and Morgan's love interest and later boyfriend whose Monrolasia counterpart is a prince.
- Griffin Newman provides the voice of Pip, a chipmunk friend of Giselle and the narrator of the film. Unlike the first film, Pip is able to speak in both the real world and Andalasia through magic. Newman replaces Jeff Bennett and Kevin Lima from the first film.

Alan Tudyk provides the voice of the talking scroll. James Monroe Iglehart, Michael McCorry Rose, and Ann Harada portray a weary businessman, a disgruntled businessman, and a sardonic businesswoman, Robert's fellow train commuters whose Monrolasia counterparts are a baker, a sign painter, and a florist respectively. Rachel Covey, who portrayed Morgan in the first film, has a cameo as a Monrolasia native. Twins Mila and Lara Jackson play Robert and Giselle's one-year-old daughter Sofia. LC Powell provided Giselle's coloratura soprano voice in "Fairytale Life (After the Spell)." Jodi Benson, who played Sam, the secretary at Robert's law firm in the first film, filmed a scene for the sequel, but it was ultimately cut.

== Production ==
=== Development ===
In February 2010, Variety reported that Walt Disney Pictures planned to film a sequel to Enchanted (2007) with Barry Josephson and Barry Sonnenfeld producing again. Jessie Nelson was attached to write the screenplay and Anne Fletcher to direct. Disney hoped the cast members from the first film would return and for a release as early as 2011.

On January 12, 2011, composer Alan Menken was asked about the sequel in an interview, to which he replied:

"I've heard things but there's nothing yet. I don't know much about what's happening with that. Honestly, I don't know what the studio wants to do next. I presume there will be some future projects for me to work on. I love doing that, I really do. But I'm not frustrated that it isn't one of them. At the moment I have a lot of stage things happening and I'm busy enough with that, so I really don't need more on my plate."

Later that year, on March 28, 2011, James Marsden, who played Prince Edward in Enchanted, was asked about the sequel.

"I don't know. I think that the clock is ticking on that one. Amy Adams and I are both saying, 'If there's going to be a sequel, we're not getting any younger.' Since we play sort of ageless animated characters. Hopefully we do. That was something really special and I'd love to come back and do another. I've heard the same things you've heard. There's a script out there somewhere and there's talk of it, but I never believe it until I see the script and learn we're making that film. So I don't know. Too many eggs in that basket."

By July 2014, Disney had hired screenwriters J. David Stem and David N. Weiss to write a script for a sequel and also hired Fletcher to direct the film. In October 2016, The Hollywood Reporter announced that Adam Shankman, who is a good friend of Fletcher, entered negotiations to direct the sequel, titled Disenchanted; that Amy Adams would reprise her role; and that filming was scheduled to begin in summer 2017. In January 2018, Shankman stated that the sequel's script would be finished within a couple of weeks and the next step would be to get the music written. He also went on to say that the film would feature more songs than the original but the same amount of animation.

On May 21, 2019, Menken said that the film had not been green-lit by Disney by that point, as the writers were still "trying to get the script right." On February 28, 2020, Schwartz said that meetings about the film had taken place in London, and revealed that Shankman will also serve as the writer for the film.

In December 2020, at Disney Investor Day, Disney Studios' President of Production Sean Bailey officially announced the sequel. Reportedly, it was the work of Brigitte Hales—the most recent writer on the project—that got the sequel greenlit after 13 years.

In January 2021, Patrick Dempsey told Good Morning America that there are plans to begin production in the spring of that year.

=== Casting ===
At the Disney Investor Day event, it was announced that Amy Adams would be returning as Giselle. Dempsey confirmed the news in early January 2021 during an interview on Good Morning America. (In an interview with Variety magazine in late April, Dempsey also revealed that he would be singing). In March 2021, composer Alan Menken confirmed that James Marsden and Idina Menzel would also be returning as Prince Edward and Nancy Tremaine, respectively.

In April 2021, Maya Rudolph, Yvette Nicole Brown, and Jayma Mays joined the cast as new characters. Rudolph plays the central antagonist in the sequel, while Brown and Mays are portraying villains, as well.

On May 17, 2021, Disney announced via Twitter that Gabriella Baldacchino would be starring as Morgan Philip, joined by new cast members Kolton Stewart and Oscar Nunez. Baldacchino replaced Rachel Covey, who played Morgan in the first film.

=== Filming ===
Principal photography was previously expected to start on May 3, 2021, in Los Angeles. The film would be partly filmed in Enniskerry, where a set was being constructed as of May 1, 2021, while other expected locations included Wicklow and Dublin. Several scenes were filmed in Powerscourt House, where the ballroom served as Malvina Monroe's residence.

On May 6, 2021, Adams confirmed on Instagram that she had arrived in Ireland to begin filming. Filming officially began on May 17, 2021. On July 8, 2021, James Marsden and Idina Menzel arrived in Dublin to shoot their roles as Prince Edward and Nancy Tremaine, respectively. Filming in Ireland concluded on July 22, 2021.

By March 28, 2022, reshoots were underway in Hambleden, Buckinghamshire, England due to mixed reception at a test screening. Reshoots also took place in New York City, having concluded in April.

=== Animation ===
On December 3, 2021, it was announced that Canadian animation studio Tonic DNA was working on the animation for the sequel using Toon Boom Harmony. Moving Picture Company provides visual effects for the film.

== Music ==
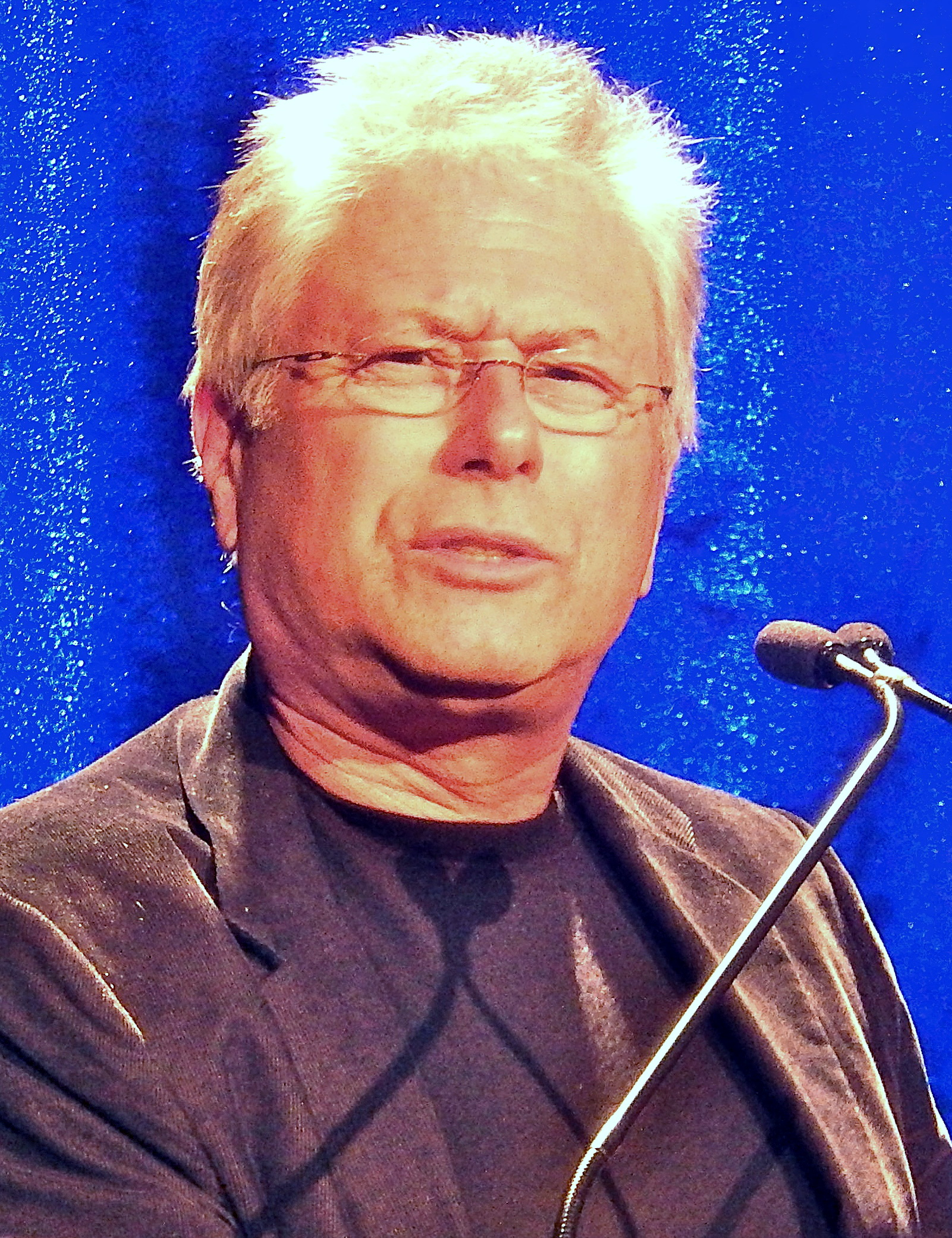
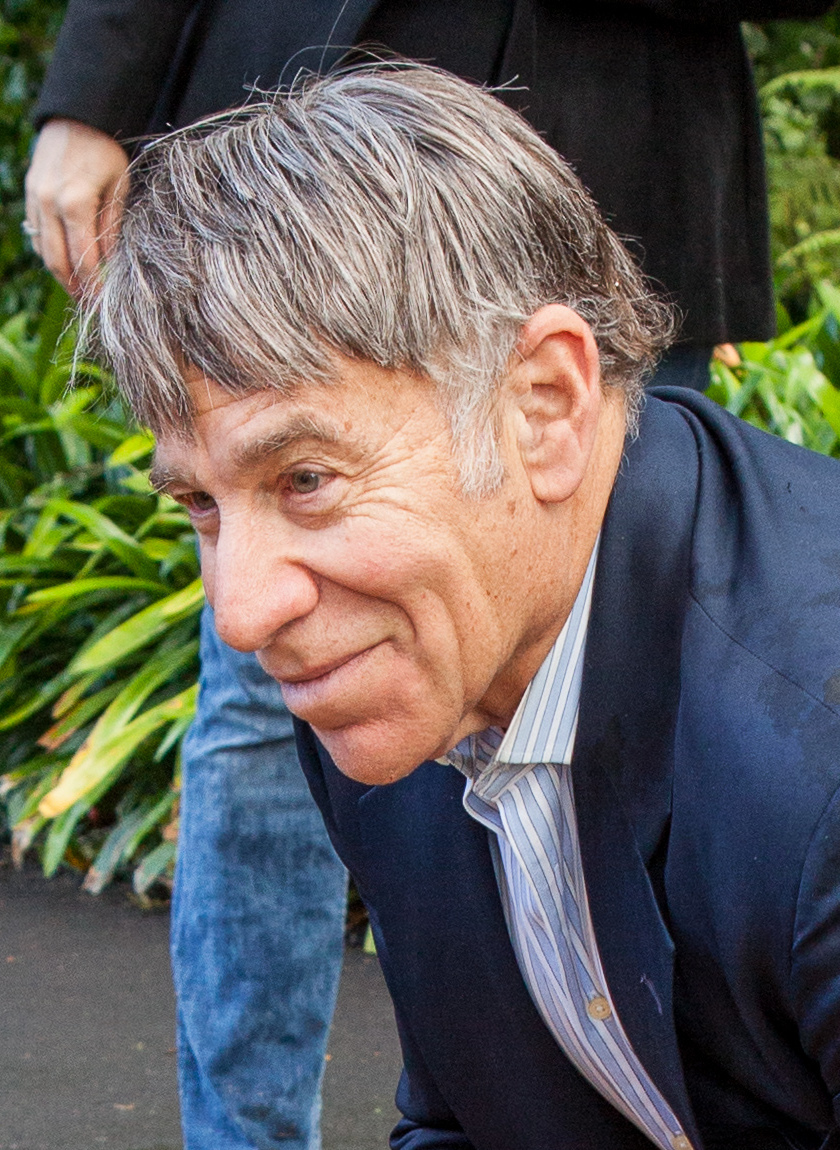
Alan Menken (left) and Stephen Schwartz (right) returned to write the film's score and songs.

In March 2018, director Adam Shankman revealed that Alan Menken and Stephen Schwartz will return from the first film to write songs for the sequel. In April 2020, Menken said that he and Schwartz are writing the film's songs.

In an interview with Variety magazine in late April 2021, Patrick Dempsey revealed that he will be singing. In May 2021, Schwartz said that the film will have seven songs and reprises, including two songs for Nancy, played by Menzel, whose song in the first film was cut.

The score and song underscoring of the film was recorded at the Newman Scoring Stage on August 29, 2022.

An interview with Entertainment Weekly revealed that one of the songs, sung by Giselle, would be called "Fairy Tale Life", and that one of Nancy's songs will be called "Love Power". On November 16, 2022, Menzel announced that the latter song would be released as a single the following day.

During "Disney+ Night" on Dancing with the Stars, host Tyra Banks announced the soundtrack would be released on November 18, 2022.

== Marketing ==
On November 12, 2021, which was Disney+ Day, the film's logo was revealed. On May 17, 2022, a first look was revealed, depicting both Giselle and Malvina. On September 9, 2022, at the D23 Expo, a teaser trailer was unveiled. The official trailer was released on November 1, 2022.

A featurette titled "Nostalgia" was released, showcasing some of the film's animated sequences. It was taken down from YouTube but reuploaded on November 12, 2022.

== Release ==
Disenchanted was originally scheduled to premiere exclusively on Disney+ on November 24, 2022, which would have coincided with Thanksgiving. On October 18, 2022, it was announced that the release would be moved up six days and would now be released on November 18, although keeping the original release date on November 24 in some territories. The film had its premiere at the El Capitan Theatre in Los Angeles on November 16, 2022.

== Reception ==
=== Viewership ===
According to JustWatch, a guide to streaming content with access to data from more than 20 million users around the world, Disenchanted was the fourth most-streamed film in the U.S. for the week of November 14–20, second for the week of November 21–27, and third overall for the month of November 2022. Whip Media, which tracks viewership data for the more than 21 million worldwide users of its TV Time app, reported it as the third most-streamed film for the week of November 18–20, and second for the week of November 25–27. Nielsen Media Research, which records streaming viewership on U.S. television screens, estimated that the film was watched for 612 million minutes from November 14 through November 20. It was later watched for 565 million minutes from November 21 though November 27, 2022.

=== Critical response ===
On the review aggregator website Rotten Tomatoes, 38% of 100 critics' reviews are positive, with an average rating of 5.4/10. The website's consensus reads: "Although Amy Adams remains just as engaging as ever, Disenchanted lacks the magic that made its predecessor a modern fairytale classic." On Metacritic, the film has a weighted average score of 50 out of 100, based on 29 critics, indicating "mixed or average" reviews.

John Nugent of Empire Magazine, gave the film three stars out of four, writing, "If you liked Enchanted, this is a dependably familiar serving. In an era where Disney is constantly raiding its archives for intellectual property to remake, this is a sequel that feels unusually original by comparison." Benjamin Lee of The Guardian, gave the film three stars out of five, writing, "A follow-up to 2007’s charming fish-out-of-water musical fantasy can’t quite recapture the magic."

Amy Nicholson of The New York Times, gave the film a negative review, writing, "In execution, “Disenchanted” feels more like a photo hunt where you earn points for spotting the onscreen Disney references." Owen Gleiberman of Variety, gave the film a negative review and said, "Giselle turns into a wicked stepmother, which only makes us miss the comedy of her niceness."

Marya E. Gates of RogerEbert.com, gave the film two stars out of four, writing, "'Disenchanted fails to truly rekindle the magic or the biting wit of its predecessor. Like most things stamped Disney these days, the film feels just like the mass-produced bobbles for sale at the Disney store." Lovia Gyarke of The Hollywood Reporter, gave the film a negative review, writing, "When Disenchanted isn’t trying to create a portrait of suburbia or examining its protagonist, it becomes a predictably plotted and humdrum battle to restore order."

Jessie Thompson of The Independent, gave the film two stars out of four and said, "The follow-up to 2007 sleeper hit ‘Enchanted’, starring Amy Adams, abandons everything that made the first film work so well."

=== Accolades ===
The film is one of the media that received the ReFrame Stamp for the years 2022 to 2023. The stamp is awarded by the gender equity coalition ReFrame and industry database IMDbPro for film and television projects that are proven to have gender-balanced hiring, with stamps being awarded to projects that hire women, especially women of color, in four out of eight key roles for their production.

Disenchanted was nominated for Best Costume Design at the 2023 Irish Film and Television Awards.

== See also ==
- List of films about witchcraft
