= Enchanted (video game) =

2007 video game

- Developer: Altron
- Publisher: Disney Interactive Studios
- Director: Yusuke Sato
- Producer: Yusuke Sato
- Programmers: Shinya Nagakawa; Takeshi Tsurumi; Shinya Odaira; Shinpei Miura; Koji Yoshida; Yuki Nakaza
- Artists: Yusuke Sato; Katsuhiko Kajiwara; Katsuki Yamaguchi; Wataru Akaogi; Takehito Yamada; Hidekazu Komori
- Composer: Tomoyoshi Sato
- Platform: Nintendo DS
- Release: NA: November 13, 2007; EU: November 16, 2007; AU: December 6, 2007; JP: March 13, 2008
- Genre: Action-adventure
- Mode: Single-player

Enchanted (Note: Mahou ni Kakeraete (魔法にかけられて; Be Hung in Magic)) is a video game for the Nintendo DS based on the Walt Disney Pictures' 2007 film Enchanted. In the animated fantasy kingdom of Andalasia, Giselle and Prince Edward are planning to be married. When Edward's evil stepmother tries to stop the marriage, Giselle is transported to New York City. Edward, along with Giselle's chipmunk, Pip, must rescue Giselle from the real world, while she meddles into the lives of an attorney, Robert, and his daughter, Morgan.

== Gameplay ==
The player adventures through Andalasia and New York City as Giselle, Prince Edward and Pip, each with their own style of gameplay.

As Giselle, the player uses the control pad to navigate through the game by performing cartwheels, climbing walls and swinging on bars. By singing songs in different types of dresses, Giselle can affect her world in different ways. The player sings a song by tracing symbols that appear on the touch screen with the stylus. The player can use the items collected throughout the game to create or enhance dresses or to create new materials. Using the stylus, the player mixes the required ingredients in the mixing barrel on the touch screen. As the player meets new animals throughout the game, they can be summoned for help with tasks such as retrieving objects or distracting enemies.

As Edward, the player uses the stylus to interact with the surroundings, and to wield a sword to battle enemies. Success in a mini-game determines the power given to Edward in battle (higher attack, defense, health, or energy). Using the stylus, the player must perform the sword actions on the touch screen. When Edward's energy bar is full, the player can use invulnerable slow motion attacks. The player uses the stylus to control Edward's horse.

In a series of mini-games, the player uses the control pad and stylus to avoid obstacles and make it to the finish line while collecting items for Giselle.

== Reception ==
IGN rated the game 6.5 out of 10. The game is praised for its appeal to several audiences through the various types of gameplay, but criticized for its mediocre execution.
