= Enchanted (film) =

2007 film directed by Kevin Lima

- Theatrical release poster by John Alvin
- Directed by: Kevin Lima
- Written by: Bill Kelly
- Produced by: Barry Josephson; Barry Sonnenfeld
- Starring: Amy Adams; Patrick Dempsey; James Marsden; Timothy Spall; Idina Menzel; Susan Sarandon
- Cinematography: Don Burgess
- Edited by: Gregory Perler; Stephen A. Rotter
- Music by: Alan Menken
- Production companies: Walt Disney Pictures; Josephson Entertainment; Right Coast Productions
- Distributed by: Walt Disney Studios Motion Pictures
- Release dates: October 20, 2007 (London); November 21, 2007 (United States)
- Running time: 107 minutes
- Country: United States
- Language: English
- Budget: $85 million
- Box office: $340.5 million

Enchanted is a 2007 American live-action/animated musical fantasy comedy film directed by Kevin Lima and written by Bill Kelly. Produced by Walt Disney Pictures, Josephson Entertainment, and Right Coast Productions and distributed by Walt Disney Studios Motion Pictures, the film stars Amy Adams, Patrick Dempsey, James Marsden, Timothy Spall, Idina Menzel, and Susan Sarandon, with Julie Andrews as the narrator. It focuses on an archetypal Disney princess-to-be named Giselle (Adams), who is exiled from her animated world into the live-action world of the New York City, where she falls in love with a divorce lawyer.

The live-action animated film is both an homage to and a self-parody of Disney's animated features, making numerous references to past works through the combination of live-action filmmaking, traditional animation, and computer-generated imagery. It also marks the return of traditional animation to a Disney feature film after the company's decision to move entirely to computer animation in 2004. Composer Alan Menken and lyricist Stephen Schwartz, who had written songs for previous Disney films, wrote and produced the songs of Enchanted, and Menken also composed the film's score. The animated sequences were produced at James Baxter Animation in Pasadena, while filming of the live-action segments took place around New York City.

Enchanted premiered at the London Film Festival on October 20, 2007, and went into its wide release in the United States on November 21. The film was critically well-received, established Adams as a leading lady, and earned $340.5 million worldwide at the box office. It won three Saturn Awards, Best Fantasy Film, Best Actress for Adams and Best Music for Menken. Enchanted also received two nominations at the 65th Golden Globe Awards and three Best Original Song nominations at the 80th Academy Awards. It is the first Walt Disney Pictures film to be distributed under the Walt Disney Studios Motion Pictures banner after Disney retired the Buena Vista brand from its distribution division. A sequel, Disenchanted, was released on Disney+ on November 18, 2022.

== Plot ==
In the animated fairy tale kingdom of Andalasia, the corrupt, ruthless and wicked Queen Narissa is determined to stay in power; her reign will end if her stepson, Prince Edward, ever gets married. Narissa enlists her loyal servant Nathaniel to help Edward hunt trolls to distract him from searching for his true love. A young woman named Giselle who lives in a forest dreams of meeting a prince and experiencing a "happily ever after." Edward hears Giselle singing and sets off to find her. Nathaniel frees a captured troll to kill Giselle, but Edward rescues her. She and Edward are instantly attracted to each other and plan to be married the following day.

Narissa disguises herself as an old hag, intercepts Giselle on her way to the wedding, and pushes her into a well. Giselle turns into a live-action version of herself and is teleported to New York City's Times Square where she becomes frightened and overwhelmed by the harshness and unfamiliarity of the city. Robert Philip, a widowed divorce lawyer who plans to propose to his girlfriend, Nancy Tremaine, and his six-year-old daughter, Morgan, encounter Giselle while on their way home. Robert reluctantly allows Giselle to stay in his apartment at the insistence of Morgan, who believes that Giselle is a princess.

Edward embarks on a mission to save Giselle, accompanied by Giselle's chipmunk friend Pip; they jump down the well, turn into live-action versions of themselves, and emerge in Times Square. To his dismay, however, Pip discovers that he cannot speak in the real world. Meanwhile, Narissa sends Nathaniel to follow Edward and sabotage his efforts to find Giselle and gives him three poisoned apples to use on Giselle, saying whoever eats them will fall into a deep sleep and die at midnight. Nancy arrives to take Morgan to school and leaves after seeing Giselle, assuming that Robert has been unfaithful to her. Robert is initially angry at Giselle, but he ends up spending the day with her to help familiarize her with the city. Giselle questions Robert about his relationship with Nancy and helps them reconcile by sending her flowers and an invitation to a costume ball at the Woolworth Building. Nathaniel attempts to give Giselle a poisoned apple twice, but his attempts fail.

Edward locates Giselle at Robert's apartment, but although he is eager to take her home to Andalasia and marry her, she suggests they should first go on a date and get to know each other better. Giselle promises to return to Andalasia after the ball that night, which Robert and Nancy also attend. Meanwhile, Nathaniel reports his failure to Narissa, who furiously decides to enter the real world and kill Giselle herself. At the ball, Robert and Giselle dance together while Nancy and Edward look on before seeing each other. Giselle and Edward then prepare to depart, but Giselle begins to feel ashamed for leaving Robert behind. Shortly before midnight, Narissa appears in her old hag form and offers the last poisoned apple to Giselle, promising that it will erase her memories of Robert. Giselle takes a bite and immediately falls into a deep sleep.

Narissa attempts to escape with Giselle's body, but Edward thwarts her. Realizing that Narissa never cared about him or Giselle, Nathaniel reveals her plot and apologizes for his previous actions. A remorseful Robert realizes that true love's kiss is the only force powerful enough to break the curse. Edward's kiss fails to wake Giselle, and he realizes that Robert should kiss Giselle instead. Robert is hesitant to do so until Nancy, despite being heartbroken, gives him her permission, and he kisses Giselle, waking her up. Outraged, Narissa transforms into a dragon and takes Robert hostage, prompting Giselle to take Edward's sword and pursue her to the top of the building to rescue Robert. Pip comes to support Giselle and causes Narissa to fall to her death, with Robert almost falling as well, but Giselle rescues him and they share another kiss.

Edward and Nancy fall in love and get married in Andalasia; Nathaniel, who stays in New York, and Pip, who returns to Andalasia (where he regains his ability to speak), write autobiographies based on their experiences in the real world; and Giselle starts a fashion design business, which becomes very successful, and forms a happy family with Robert and Morgan.

== Cast ==
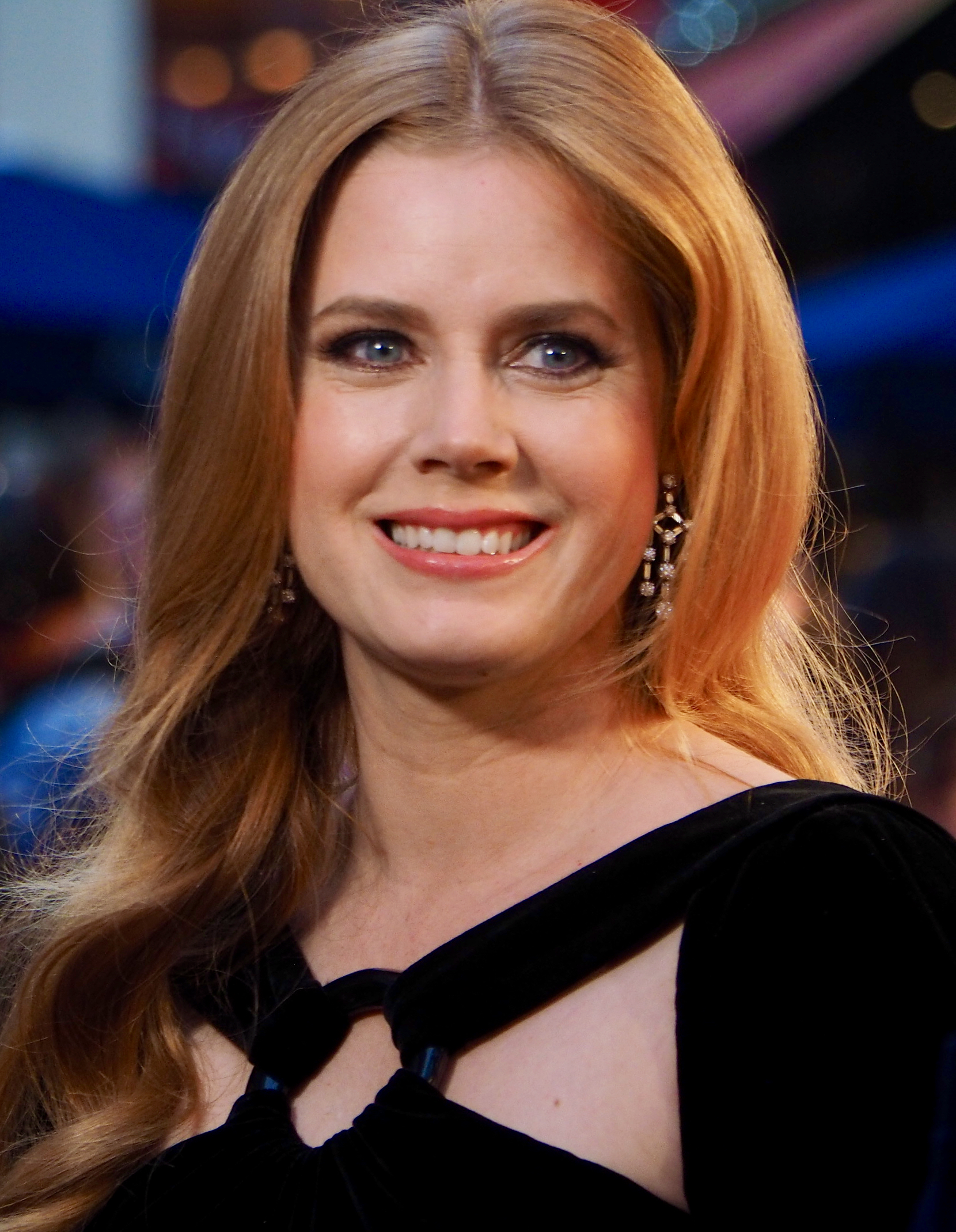
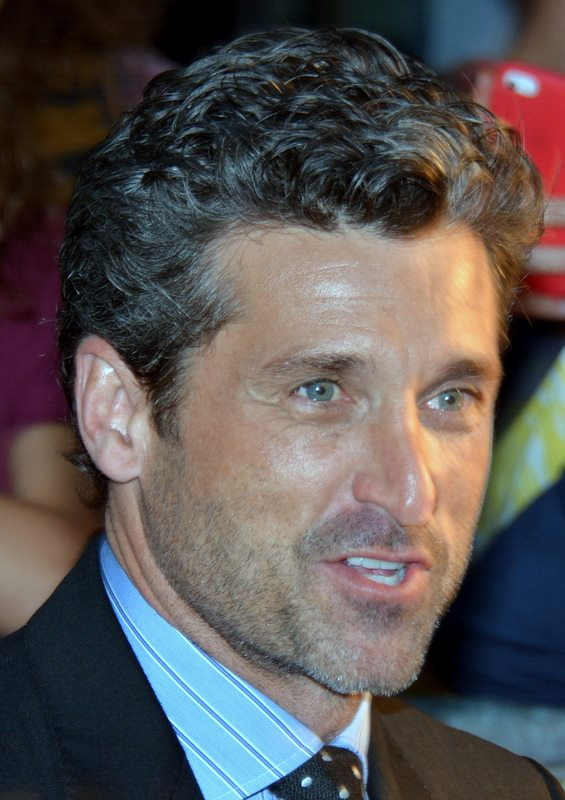
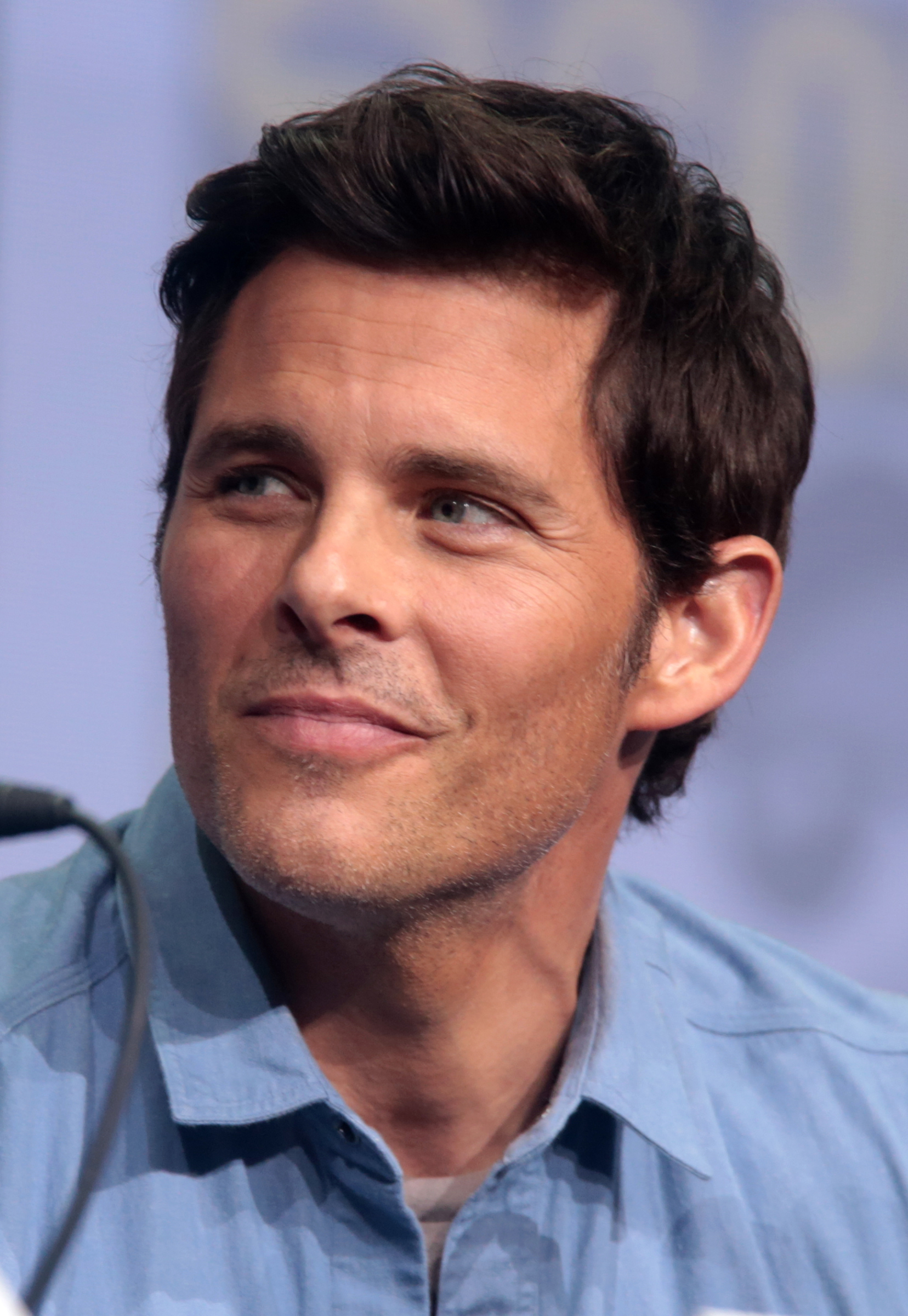
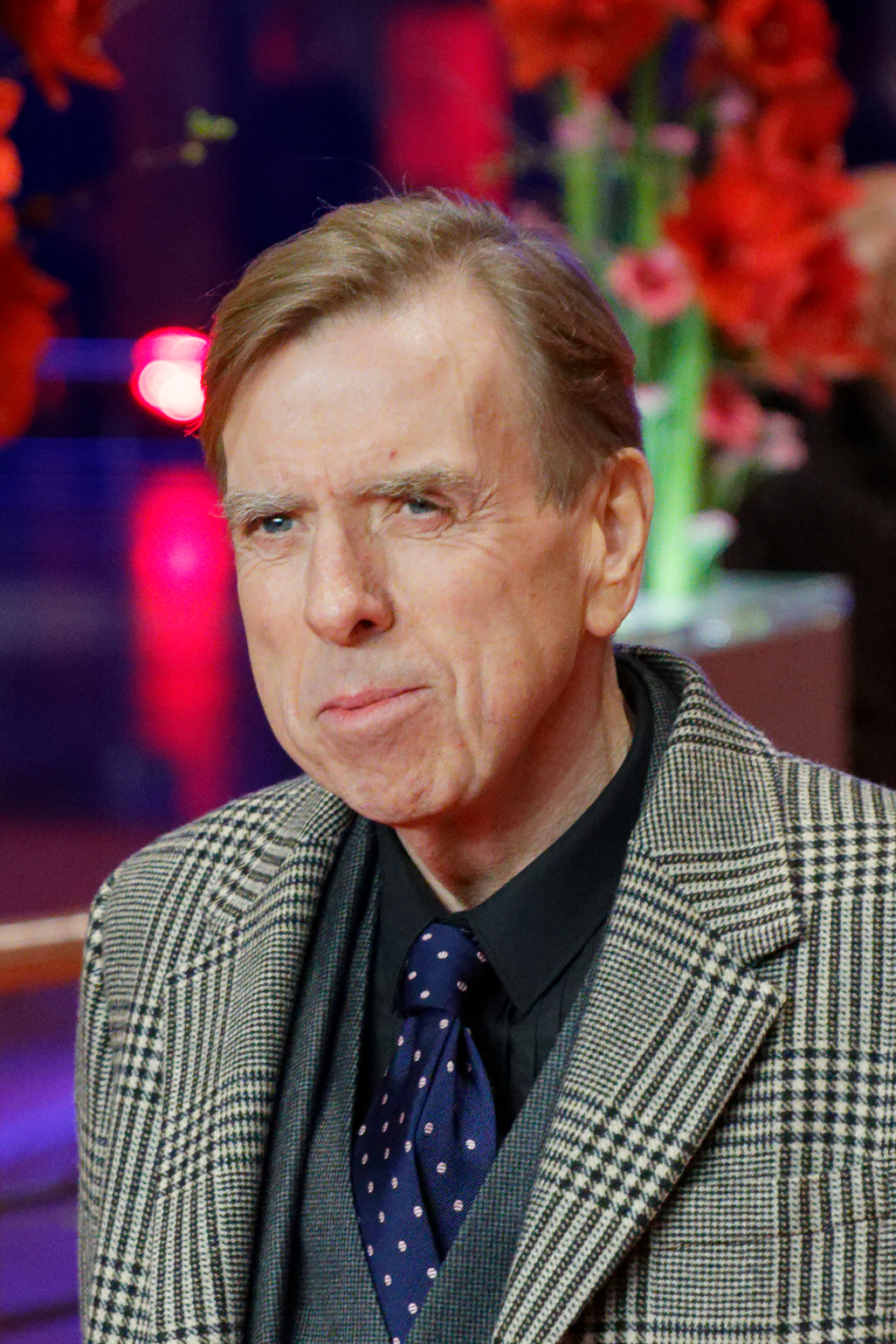
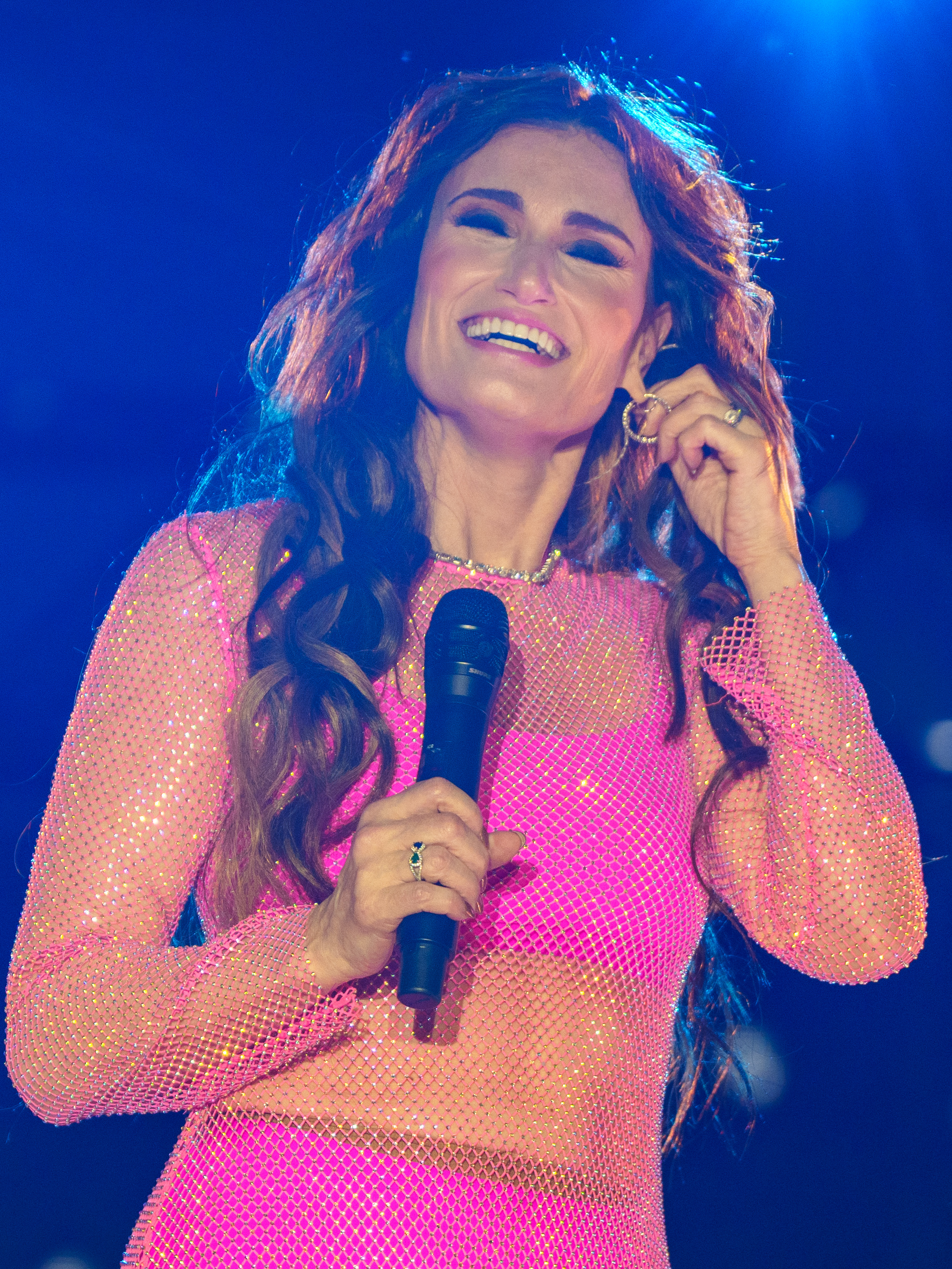
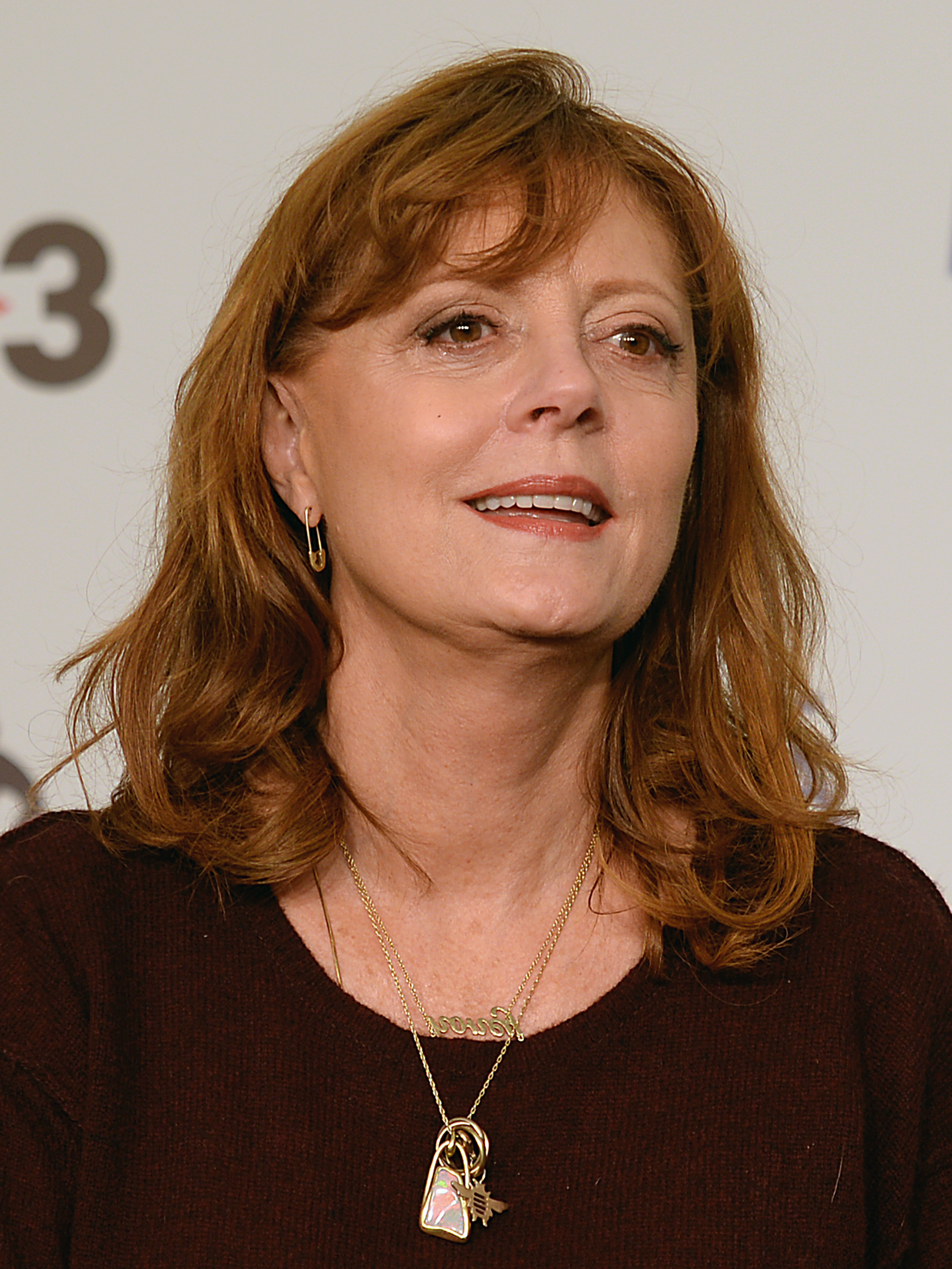
Top row: Amy Adams (left), Patrick Dempsey (both pictured in 2016) and James Marsden (2017) play Giselle, Robert and Prince Edward.
Bottom row: Timothy Spall (left, pictured in 2017), Idina Menzel (2023) and Susan Sarandon (right, pictured in 2017) play Nathaniel, Nancy and Queen Narissa.
- Amy Adams as Giselle, a princess-to-be who hails from Andalasia and displays similar traits to early Disney Princesses; Lima describes her as "about 80% Snow White, with some traits borrowed from Cinderella and Princess Aurora from Sleeping Beauty... although her spunkiness comes from Ariel from The Little Mermaid". She is "eternally optimistic and romantic" but is also "very independent and true to her convictions".
- Patrick Dempsey as Robert Philip: A cynical Manhattan divorce attorney at Churchill, Harline & Smith LLP who does not believe in true love or fairy tales since his wife left him and their daughter. He falls in love with Giselle after her adventure to New York City, and her sense of fun gradually rubs off on him over the course of the film.
- James Marsden as Prince Edward, a dim-witted but brave, heroic and good-hearted prince in Andalasia and Queen Narissa's stepson. He is "very pure, very simple-minded and naive, but innocently narcissistic".
- Susan Sarandon as Queen Narissa, Edward's evil stepmother, a sorceress, and a megalomaniac with a hatred for Giselle. Her mannerisms, characteristics, powers, and physical features were inspired by classic Disney villainesses such as the Evil Queen from Snow White and the Seven Dwarfs and Maleficent from Sleeping Beauty.
- Timothy Spall as Nathaniel, Queen Narissa's servant who is controlled through his infatuation with her and his own lack of self-esteem, and has a penchant for disguises.
- Idina Menzel as Nancy Tremaine, a fashion designer and Robert's girlfriend. She is named after Lady Tremaine, the stepmother from Cinderella.
- Rachel Covey as Morgan Philip, Robert's 6-year-old daughter who, despite her father misunderstanding her and telling her otherwise, believes in fairy tales and magic.

Giselle's chipmunk friend Pip is voiced by Jeff Bennett in Andalasia, where he has no trouble expressing himself through speech, while the film's director Kevin Lima voices Pip in the real world, where he must communicate through squeaks and charades. Much of Pip's personality was based on Disney sidekicks such as Mushu from Mulan and Timon from The Lion King. The Andalasia cast also includes Lima's daughter Emma Rose Lima as the bluebird and the fawn, Teala Dunn as a bunny and Fred Tatasciore as the troll. Julie Andrews provides the film's narration.

Paige O'Hara (who previously voiced Belle in Beauty and the Beast) and Judy Kuhn (who provided the singing voice of Pocahontas in the 1995 animated film of the same name) make cameo appearances as soap opera character Angela and a pregnant woman Edward encounters, respectively. John Rothman and Jodi Benson (who voiced Ariel in The Little Mermaid) portray, respectively, Robert's boss Carl and secretary Sam, while Tonya Pinkins and Isiah Whitlock Jr. portray Phoebe and Ethan Banks, a couple whose divorce Robert is mediating. Marlon Saunders and Jon McLaughlin appear as vocalists who sing "That's How You Know" and "So Close", respectively.

== Production ==
=== Development ===
The initial script of Enchanted, written by Bill Kelly, was bought by Disney's Touchstone Pictures and Sonnenfeld/Josephson Productions for a reported sum of $450,000 in September 1997. The script was written for three years, but it was thought to be unsuitable for Walt Disney Pictures because it was "a racier R-rated movie", inspired by the adult-risque comedy movies in the 1980s and 1990s such as Fast Times at Ridgemont High and American Pie. The first draft of the script had Giselle being mistaken for a stripper when she arrives in New York City. To the frustration of Kelly, the screenplay was rewritten several times, first by Rita Hsiao and then by Todd Alcott. The film was initially scheduled to be released in 2002 with Rob Marshall as director but he withdrew due to "creative differences" with the producers. In 2001, director Jon Turteltaub was set to direct the film but he left soon after, later working with Disney and Jerry Bruckheimer on the National Treasure franchise. Adam Shankman became the film's director in 2003, while Bob Schooley and Mark McCorkle were hired by Disney to rewrite the script once again. At the time, Disney considered offering the role of Giselle to Kate Hudson or Reese Witherspoon. However, the project did not take off.

On May 25, 2005, Variety reported that Kevin Lima (who previously directed Tarzan and 102 Dalmatians) had been hired as director and Bill Kelly had returned to the project to write a new version of the script. Lima worked with Kelly on the script to combine the main plot of Enchanted with the idea of a "loving homage" to Disney's heritage. He created detailed storyboards for the entire film that took a whole floor of the production building to display. After Lima showed them to Dick Cook, the chairman of the Walt Disney Studios, he received the green light for the project and a budget of $85 million. Lima began designing the world of Andalasia and storyboarding the movie before a cast was chosen to play the characters. After the actors were hired, he was involved in the final design of the movie and made sure the animated characters look like their real-life counterparts.

=== Casting ===
Amy Adams was announced to have been cast in the role of Giselle on November 14, 2005. Although the studio was looking for a film star in the role, director Kevin Lima insisted on casting a lesser-known actress. Out of the 300 or so actresses who auditioned for the role, Adams stood out to Lima because not only did she look like a Disney princess but her "commitment to the character, her ability to escape into the character's being without ever judging the character was overwhelming". Lima cast Patrick Dempsey as Robert after Disney was satisfied with the casting of Adams but had wanted more well-known actors in the film. Dempsey, whose starring role on TV series Grey's Anatomy had earned him the nickname "McDreamy", was described by Lima as "a modern-day Prince Charming to today's audience". The role was challenging for Dempsey because he had to play the straight man to Adams' and Marsden's more outrageous characters. James Marsden was announced to have been cast as Prince Edward on December 6, 2005. At the time Marsden was auditioning, the role of Robert had not been cast but he decided to pursue the role of Prince Edward because he was "more fun and he responded more to that character". Susan Sarandon was cast as Queen Narissa, and had been attracted to the project prior to Lima's involvement as director. Since Sarandon's on-screen time was relatively short, it took only two weeks to film her scenes. Idina Menzel was cast as Nancy, and commented that since the role did not require any singing, "it was a compliment to be asked to just be hired on my acting talents alone".

=== Filming ===
Enchanted is the first feature-length Disney live-action/traditional animation hybrid since Who Framed Roger Rabbit (1988), though the traditionally animated characters do not interact in the live-action environment in the same method as they did in Roger Rabbit; however, there are some scenes where live-action characters share the screen with two-dimensional animated characters, for example, a live-action Nathaniel communicating with a cel-drawn Narissa, who is in a cooking pot. The film uses two aspect ratios; it begins in 2.35:1 when the Disney logo and Enchanted storybook are shown, and then switches to a smaller 1.85:1 aspect ratio for the first animated sequence. The film switches back to 2.35:1 when it becomes live-action and never switches back, even for the remainder of the animated sequences. When this movie was aired on televised networks, the beginning of the movie (minus the Walt Disney Pictures logo and opening credits) was shown in the pillarboxed 4:3 aspect ratio; the remainder of the movie was shown in the 16:9 aspect ratio when it becomes live-action. The fullscreen version uses the 4:3 format during the entire movie, while the open matte version retains the letterboxed 1.85:1 format for the first animated sequence then switches to an open matted 1.85:1 format for the rest of the movie when it switches to live-action. Lima oversaw the direction of both the live-action and animation sequences, which were being produced at the same time Enchanted took almost two years to complete. The animation took about a year to finish while the live-action scenes, which commenced filming on location in New York City during the summer of 2006 and were completed during the animation process, were shot in 72 days.

==== Animation ====
Out of the film's 107 minutes of running time, ten of the approximately 13 minutes of animation are at the beginning of the film. Lima tried to "cram every single piece of Disney iconic imagery" that he could into the first ten minutes, which were done in traditional animation (in contrast to computer-generated imagery 3D animation) as a tribute to past Disney fairy tale films such as Sleeping Beauty, Cinderella, and Snow White and the Seven Dwarfs. It was the first Disney film theatrically released in America to feature traditional animation since Pooh's Heffalump Movie (2005). This film, although quite different in terms of plot from any previous Disney film, also contained obvious homages to other Disney films of the distant past, such as Old Yeller, The Shaggy Dog, Swiss Family Robinson, Bon Voyage!, and Savage Sam. As most of Disney's traditional animation artists were laid off after the computer graphics boom of the late 1990s, the 13 minutes of animation were not done in-house but by the independent Pasadena-based company James Baxter Animation, founded by former Disney animator Baxter.

Although Lima wanted the animation to be nostalgic, he wanted Enchanted to have a style of its own. Baxter's team decided to use Art Nouveau as a starting point. For Giselle, the hand-drawn animated character had to be "a cross between Amy Adams and a classic Disney princess. And not a caricature." Seeing Giselle as "a forest girl, an innocent nymph with flowers in her hair" and "a bit of a hippie", the animators wanted her to be "flowing, with her hair and clothes. Delicate." For Prince Edward, Baxter's team "worked the hardest on him to make him look like the actor" because princes "in these kinds of movies are usually so bland." Many prototypes were made for Narissa as Baxter's team wanted her face to "look like Susan Sarandon. And the costumes had to align closely to the live-action design."

To maintain continuity between the two media, Lima brought in costume designer Mona May during the early stages of the film's production so the costumes would be aligned in both the animated and live-action worlds. He also shot some live-action footage of Amy Adams as Giselle for the animators to use as reference, which also allowed the physical movement of the character to match in both worlds. Test scenes completed by the animators were shown to the actors, allowing them to see how their animated selves would move.

==== Live-action ====
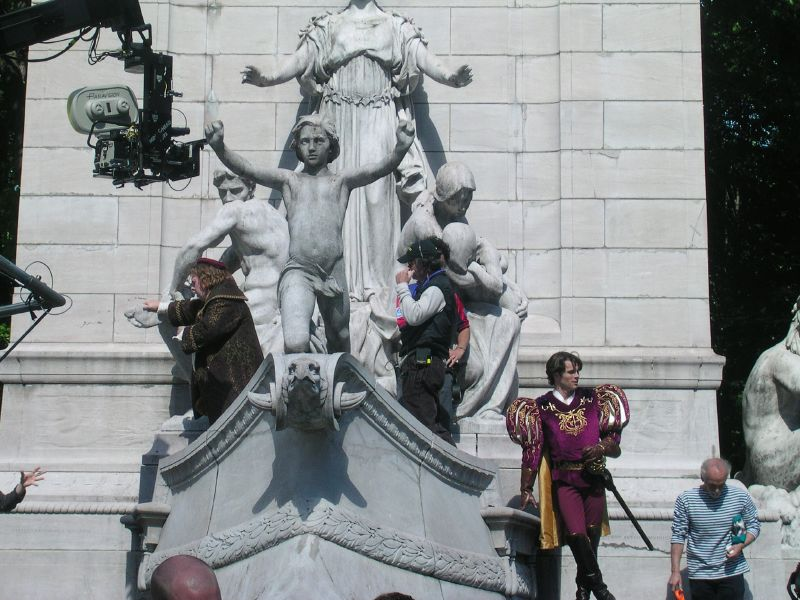
Timothy Spall and James Marsden during filming in Columbus Circle

Principal photography began in April 2006 and ended in July. Because of the sequence setting, the live action scenes were filmed in New York City. However, shooting in New York became problematic as it was in a "constant state of new stores, scaffolding and renovation".

The first scene in New York, which features Giselle emerging from a manhole in the middle of Times Square, was filmed on location in the center of the square. Because of the difficulties in controlling the crowd while filming in Times Square, general pedestrians were featured in the scene with hired extras placed in the immediate foreground. Similarly, a crowd gathered to watch as James Marsden and Timothy Spall filmed their scenes in Times Square. However, the scene Lima found the most challenging to shoot was the musical number, "That's How You Know", in Central Park. The five-minute scene took 17 days to finish due to the changing weather, which allowed only seven sunny days for the scene to be filmed. The filming was also hampered at times by Patrick Dempsey's fans. The scene was choreographed by John O'Connell, who had worked on Moulin Rouge! beforehand, and included 300 extras and 150 dancers.

Many scenes were filmed at Steiner Studios, which provided the three large stages that Enchanted needed at the same facility. Other outdoor locations included the Brooklyn Bridge and The Paterno, an apartment building with a curved, heavily embellished, ivory-colored façade located on the corner of Riverside Drive and 116th Street, which is the residence of the film's characters Robert and Morgan.

=== Costume design ===
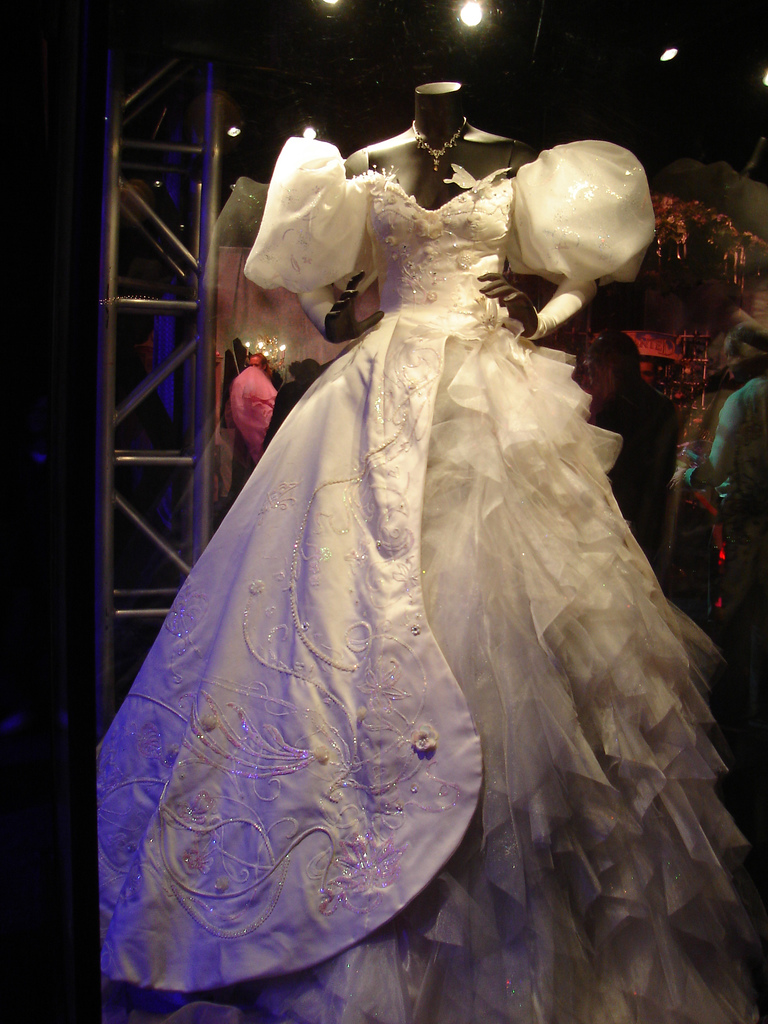
Giselle's wedding dress on display at the El Capitan Theatre

All the costumes in the film were designed by Mona May, who had previously worked on Clueless (1995), The Wedding Singer (1998), and The Haunted Mansion (2003). To create the costumes, May spent one year in pre-production working with animators and her costume department of twenty people, while she contracted with five outside costume shops in Los Angeles and New York City. She became involved in the project during the time when the animators were designing the faces and bodies of the characters as they had to "translate the costumes from two-dimensional drawings to live-action human proportion". Her goal was to keep the designs "Disneyesque to the core but bring a little bit of fashion in there and humor and make it something new". However, May admitted this was difficult "because they're dealing with iconic Disney characters who have been in the psyche of the viewing audience for so long".

For the character of Giselle, her journey to becoming a real woman is reflected in her dresses, which become less fairy tale-like as the film progresses. Her wedding dress at the beginning of the film directly contrasts her modern gown at the end of the film. The wedding dress served to provide a "humongous contrast to the flat drawings" and to accentuate the image of a Disney Princess. In order to make the waist look small, the sleeves are designed to be "extremely pouffy" and the skirt to be as big as possible, which included a metal hoop that holds up twenty layers of petticoats and ruffles. Altogether, eleven versions of the dress were made for filming, each made of 200 yards (183 m) of silk satin and other fabric, and weighing approximately 40 pounds (18 kg). On the experience of wearing the wedding dress, Amy Adams described it as "grueling" since "the entire weight was on her hips, so occasionally it felt like she was in traction".

Unlike Giselle, Prince Edward does not adapt to the real world and James Marsden, who plays Edward, had only one costume designed for him. May's aim was to try "not to lose Marsden in the craziness of the outfit... where he still looks handsome". The costume also included padding in the chest, buttocks, and crotch, which gave Marsden the "same exaggerated proportions as an animated character" and "posture – his back is straight, the sleeves are up and never collapse".

May was delighted that Lima "went for something more fashion-forward" with Susan Sarandon's Queen Narissa. She decided to make her look like a "runway lady", wearing something that is "still Disney" but also "high fashion, like something John Galliano or Thierry Mugler might design". Since Narissa appears in three media: hand drawn animation, live-action, and computer animation, May had to make sure that the costume would be the same throughout in terms of "color, shape, and texture". The costume for Narissa consisted of a leather corset and skirt, which looked "reptilian", as well as a cape. Working with the animators, May incorporated parts of the dragon's form into the costume; the cape was designed to look like wings, the layers of the skirt wrap around like a tail and a crown that would turn into horns during Narissa's transformation into a dragon.

=== Music ===
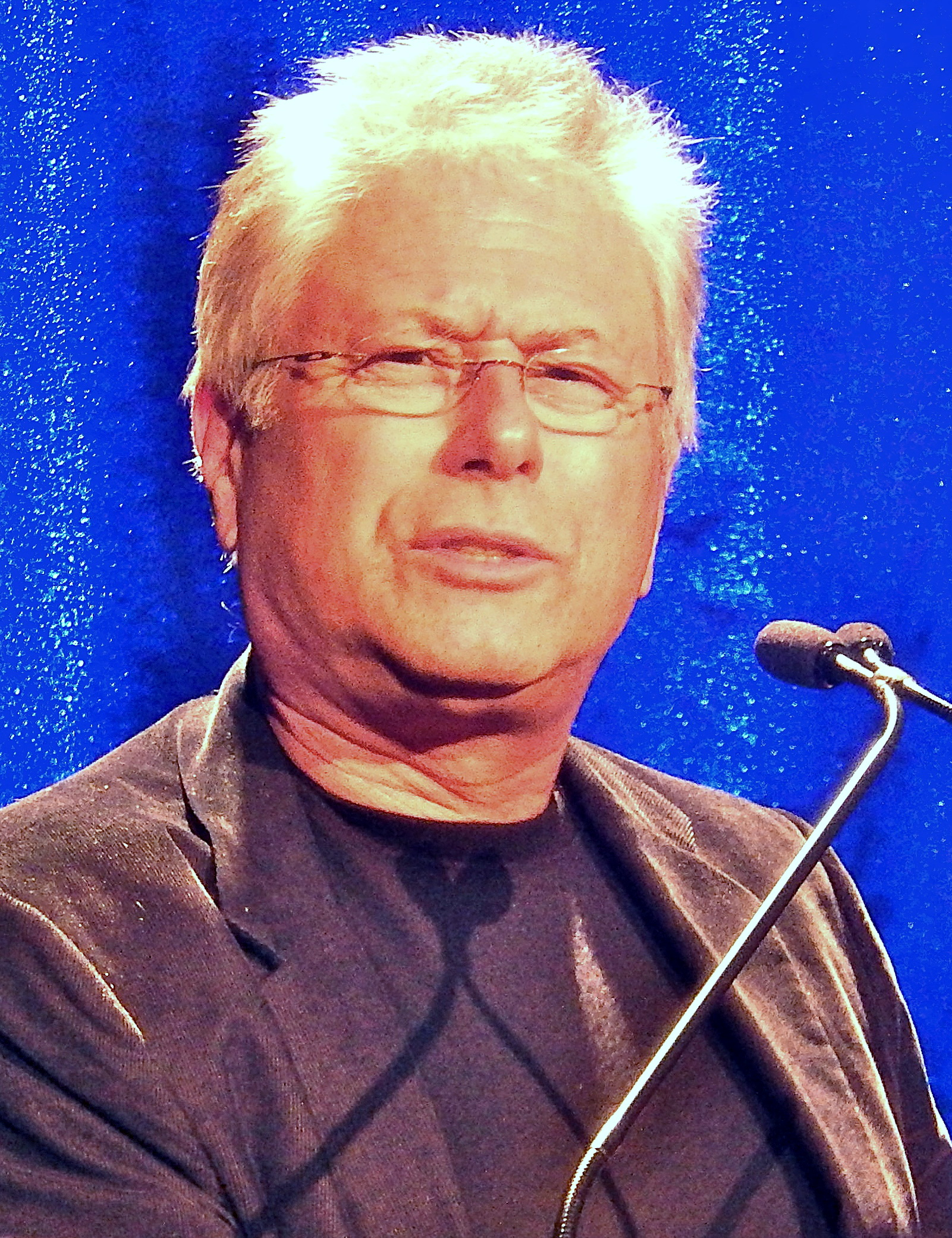
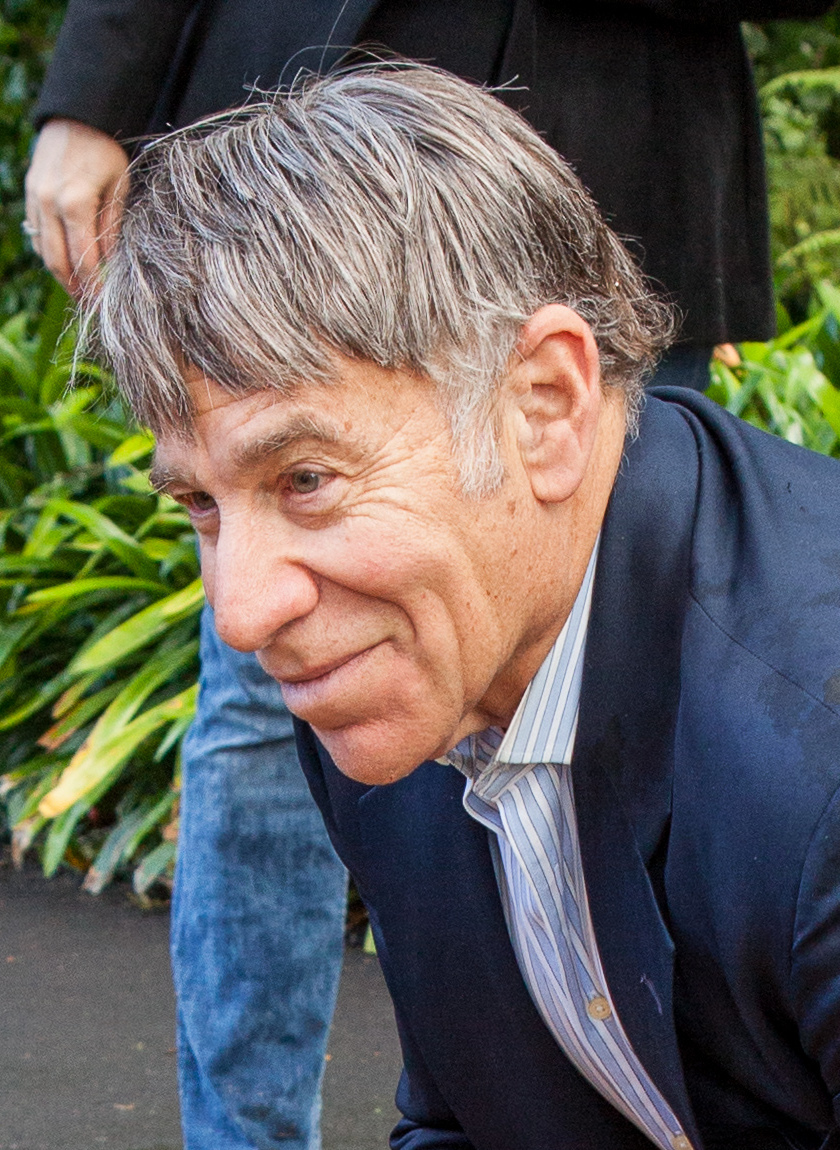
Alan Menken (left, pictured in 2013) and Stephen Schwartz (right, 2018) wrote the film's score and songs.

Alan Menken wrote the film's score, after previously working on various Disney animated projects. Fellow composer Stephen Schwartz wrote the lyrics for six songs, also composed by Menken. Menken and Schwartz previously worked together on the songs for Pocahontas and The Hunchback of Notre Dame.

Menken became involved with the film in the early stages of the film's development and invited Schwartz to resume their collaboration. They began the songwriting process by searching for the right moments in the story in which a song moment was allowed. Schwartz found that it was easier to justify situations in which the characters would burst into songs in Enchanted than in other live-action musicals as its concept "allowed the characters to sing in a way that was completely integral to the plot of the story." The three songs Giselle sings contain references to earlier Disney films. The first song played in the film, "True Love's Kiss", was written to be "a send-up of, and an homage to, the style of those Disney animated features", namely, "I'm Wishing" (Snow White and the Seven Dwarfs) and "A Dream is a Wish Your Heart Makes" (Cinderella), during which Disney heroines sing about the joy of being loved. It posed a challenge for Menken and Schwartz because of the "many preconceptions with that number"; it had to be reflective of the era of Snow White and the Seven Dwarfs and Cinderella. Accordingly, Amy Adams performed the first song in an operetta style in contrast to the Broadway style of the later songs.

Both "Happy Working Song" and "That's How You Know" also pay tributes to past Disney songs and movies. "Happy Working Song" pays a lyrical homage to such songs as "Whistle While You Work" (Snow White and the Seven Dwarfs), "The Work Song" (Cinderella), "A Spoonful of Sugar" (Mary Poppins) and "Making Christmas" (The Nightmare Before Christmas), and a musical homage to the Sherman Brothers (with a self-parodic "Alan Menken style" middle eight). "That's How You Know" is a self-parody of Menken's compositions for his Disney features, specifically such big production numbers as "Under the Sea" (The Little Mermaid) and "Be Our Guest" (Beauty and the Beast). To achieve this, Schwartz admitted he had to "push it a little bit further in terms of choices of words or certain lyrics" while maintaining "the classic Walt Disney sensibility". However, Menken noted that the songs he has written for Disney have always been "a little tongue-in-cheek". As the film progresses, the music uses more contemporary styles, which is heard through the adult ballad "So Close" and the country/pop number "Ever Ever After" (sung by Carrie Underwood as a voice-over).

Out of the six completed songs written and composed by Menken and Schwartz, five remained in the finished film. The title song, "Enchanted," a duet featuring Idina Menzel and James Marsden, was the only song of Menken's and Schwartz's authorship and composition that was deleted from the movie.

=== Effects ===
The majority of the visual effects shots in Enchanted were done by Tippett Studio in Berkeley, California, who contributed a total of 320 shots. These shots involved virtual sets, environmental effects and CGI characters that performed alongside real actors, namely the animated animals during the "Happy Working Song" sequence, Pip and the Narissa dragon during the live-action portions of the film. CIS Hollywood was responsible for 36 visual effects shots, which primarily dealt with wire removals and composites. Reel FX Creative Studios did four visual effects shots involving the pop-up book page-turn transitions while Weta Digital did two.

Out of all the animals that appear in the "Happy Working Song" sequence, the only real animals filmed on set were rats and pigeons. The real animals captured on film aided Tippett Studio in creating CGI rats and pigeons, which gave dynamic performances such as having pigeons that carried brooms in their beaks and rats that scrubbed with toothbrushes. On the other hand, all the cockroaches were CGI characters.

Pip, a chipmunk who can talk in the 2D world of Andalasia, loses his ability to communicate through speech in the real world so he must rely heavily on facial and body gestures. This meant the animators had to display Pip's emotions through performance as well as making him appear like a real chipmunk. The team at Tippett began the process of animating Pip by observing live chipmunks which were filmed in motion from "every conceivable angle", after which they created a photorealistic chipmunk through the use of 3D computer graphics software, Alias Maya and Furrocious. When visual effects supervisor Thomas Schelesny showed the first animation of Pip to director Kevin Lima, he was surprised that he was a looking at a CG character and not reference footage. To enhance facial expressions, the modelers gave Pip eyebrows, which real chipmunks do not have. During the filming of scenes in which Pip appears, a number of ways were used to indicate the physical presence of Pip. On some occasions, a small stuffed chipmunk with a wire armature on the inside was placed in the scene. In other situations, a rod with a small marker on the end or a laser pointer would be used to show the actors and cinematographer where Pip is.

Unlike Pip, the Narissa dragon was allowed to be more of a fantasy character while still looking like a living character and a classic Disney villain. The CGI dragon design was loosely based on a traditional Chinese dragon and Susan Sarandon's live-action witch. When filming the scene which sees the transformation of Narissa from a woman into a dragon, a long pole was used to direct the extras' eyelines instead of a laser pointer. Set pieces were made to move back and forth in addition to having a computer-controlled lighting setup and a repeatable head on the camera that were all synchronized. In the film's final sequence, in which Narissa climbs the Woolworth Building while clutching Robert in her claws, a greenscreen rig was built to hold Patrick Dempsey in order to film his face and movements. The rig was a "puppeteering" approach that involved a robotic arm being controlled by three different floor effects artists.

== Release ==
The film was distributed by Walt Disney Studios Motion Pictures to 3,730 theaters in the United States. It was distributed worldwide by Walt Disney Studios Motion Pictures International to over 50 territories around the world and topped the box office in several countries including the United Kingdom and Italy. It is the first movie to be released under the Walt Disney Studios Motion Pictures name following the retirement of the previous Buena Vista Pictures Distribution.

=== Merchandising ===
Disney had originally planned to add Giselle to the Disney Princess line-up, as it was shown at a 2007 Toy Fair where the Giselle doll was featured with packaging declaring her with Disney Princess status, but decided against it when they realized they would have to pay for lifelong rights to Amy Adams' image. While Giselle is not being marketed as one of the Disney Princesses, Enchanted merchandise was made available in various outlets with Adams' animated likeness being used on all Giselle merchandise. Giselle led the 2007 Hollywood Holly-Day Parade at Disney's Hollywood Studios. She was also featured in the 2007 Walt Disney World Christmas Day Parade in the Magic Kingdom with the official Disney Princesses.

A video game based on the film was released for Nintendo DS and mobile phones in addition to a Game Boy Advance title, Enchanted: Once Upon Andalasia, which is a prequel to the film, about Giselle and Pip rescuing Andalasia from a magic spell.

=== Home media ===
Enchanted was released on Blu-ray Disc and DVD by Walt Disney Studios Home Entertainment on March 18, 2008, in the United States. While Enchanted topped the DVD sales chart on the week of its release in the United States, narrowly defeating the DVD sales of I Am Legend, the Blu-ray Disc sales of I Am Legend were nearly four times the number of Blu-ray Disc sales of Enchanted. Overall, Enchanted was the eighth best-selling film on home video with 5.3 million units sold and earning a revenue of $86.3 million. Consumers could receive $9 in rebates by purchasing a Cinnabon Cereal box and two packs of Rayovac batteries. The DVD was released in United Kingdom and Europe on April 7, 2008, Australia on May 21, 2008 and in other 50 international countries on 2008.

The bonus features included on both the Blu-ray Disc and DVD are "Fantasy Comes to Life", a three-part behind-the-scenes feature including "Happy Working Song", "That's How You Know" and "A Blast at the Ball"; six deleted scenes with brief introductions by director Kevin Lima; bloopers; "Pip's Predicament: A Pop-Up Adventure", a short in pop-up storybook style; and Carrie Underwood's music video for "Ever Ever After". Featured on the Blu-ray disc only is a trivia game titled "The D Files" that runs throughout the movie with high scoring players given access to videos "So Close", "Making Ever Ever After" and "True Love's Kiss". In the United States, certain DVDs at Target stores contain a bonus DVD with a 30-minute-long making-of documentary titled Becoming Enchanted: A New Classic Comes True. This DVD is also sold with certain DVDs at HMV stores in the United Kingdom.

On November 12, 2021, the film was added to Disney+ to coincide with Disney+ Day. On October 26, 2022, the film was upgraded to 4K resolution on Disney+.

== Reception ==
=== Box office ===
Enchanted earned $8 million on the day of its release in the United States, placing at #1. It was also placed at #1 on Thanksgiving Day, earning $6.7 million to bring its two-day total to $14.6 million. The film grossed $14.4 million on the following day, bringing its total haul to $29.0 million placing ahead of other contenders. Enchanted made $34.4 million on the Friday-Sunday period in 3,730 theaters for a per-location average of $9,472 and $49.1 million over the five-day Thanksgiving holiday in 3,730 theaters for a per-location average of $13,153. Its earnings over the five-day holiday exceeded projections by $7 million. Ranking as the second-highest Thanksgiving opening after Toy Story 2, which earned $80.1 million over the five-day holiday in 1999, Enchanted is the first film to open at #1 on the Thanksgiving frame in the 21st century.

In its second weekend, Enchanted was also the #1 film, grossing a further $16.4 million at 3,730 locations for a per-theater average of $4,397. It dropped to #2 in its third weekend, with a gross of $10.7 million in 3,520 theaters for a per-theater average of $3,042. It finished its fourth weekend at #4 with a gross of $5.5 million in 3,066 locations for a per-theater average of $1,804. Enchanted earned a gross of $127.8 million in the United States and Canada as well as a total of $340.5 million worldwide. It was the 15th highest-grossing film worldwide released in 2007.

=== Critical response ===
Enchanted received positive reviews from film critics upon release. On review aggregator website Rotten Tomatoes, the film has an approval rate of 93% based on 193 reviews, with an average score of 7.4/10. The site's critical consensus reads: "A smart re-imagining of fairy tale tropes that's sure to delight children and adults, Enchanted features witty dialogue, sharp animation, and a star turn by Amy Adams." Metacritic gave it a rating of 75 out of 100 based on 32 reviews, indicating "generally favorable" reviews. Rotten Tomatoes ranked the film as the ninth best reviewed film in wide release of 2007 and named it the best family film of 2007. Audiences surveyed by CinemaScore gave the film a grade "A-" on scale of A to F.

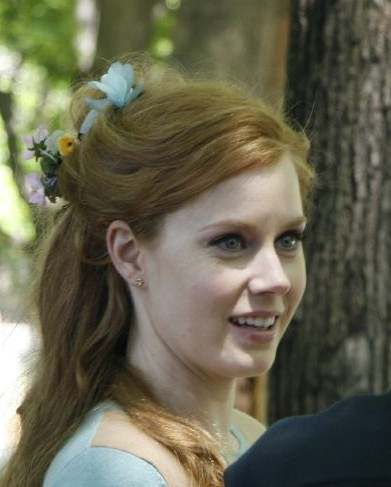
Amy Adams (pictured in 2006) received praise for her role as Giselle.

Positive reviews praised the film's take on a classic Disney story, its comedy and musical numbers as well as the performance of its lead actress, Amy Adams. Roger Ebert of Chicago Sun-Times gave the film three stars out of four, describing it as a "heart-winning musical comedy that skips lightly and sprightly from the lily pads of hope to the manhole covers of actuality" and one that "has a Disney willingness to allow fantasy into life". Film critics of Variety and LA Weekly remarked on the film's ability to cater for all ages. LA Weekly described the film as "the sort of buoyant, all-ages entertainment that Hollywood has been laboring to revive in recent years (most recently with Hairspray) but hasn't managed to get right until now" while Todd McCarthy of Variety commented, "More than Disney's strictly animated product, Enchanted, in the manner of the vast majority of Hollywood films made until the '60s, is a film aimed at the entire population – niches be damned. It simply aims to please, without pandering, without vulgarity, without sops to pop-culture fads, and to pull this off today is no small feat." Enchanted was the Broadcast Film Critics Association's choice for Best Family Film of 2007 while Carrie Rickey of The Philadelphia Inquirer named it the 4th best film of 2007.

Rolling Stone, Premiere, USA Today, and The Boston Globe all gave the film three out of four, while The Baltimore Sun gave the film a B grade. They cited that although the story is relatively predictable, the way in which the predictability of the film is part of the story, the amazingly extravagant musical numbers, along with the way in which Disney pokes fun at its traditional line of animated movies outweighs any squabbles about storyline or being unsure of what age bracket the film is made for. Michael Sragow of The Baltimore Sun remarked that the film's "piquant idea and enough good jokes to overcome its uneven movie-making and uncertain tone", while Claudia Puig of USA Today stated that "though it's a fairly predictable fish-out-of-water tale (actually a princess-out-of-storybook saga), the casting is so perfect that it takes what could have been a ho-hum idea and renders it magical."

Amy Adams herself garnered many favorable reviews. Reviewers praised her singing ability and asserted that her performance, which was compared by some to her Academy Award-nominated performance in Junebug, has made Adams a movie star, likening it to Mary Poppins' effect on Julie Andrews' career. Similarly, film critics Richard Roeper and Michael Phillips, who gave the film positive reviews on At the Movies with Ebert & Roeper, emphasized the effect of Adams' performance on the film with remarks like "Amy Adams is this movie" and "Amy Adams shows how to make a comic cliché work like magic." However, both agreed that the final sequence involving the computer-generated dragon "bogged down" the film.

Empire stated that the film was targeted at children but agreed with other reviewers that the "extremely game cast" was the film's best asset. It gave the film three out of five. TIME gave the film a C−, stating that the film "cannibalizes Walt's vault for jokes" and "fails to find a happy ending that doesn't feel two-dimensional". Peter Bradshaw of The Guardian gave the film two out of five and commented that the film "assumes a beady-eyed and deeply humourless sentimentality" and that Adams' performance was the "only decent thing in this overhyped family movie covered in a cellophane shrink-wrap of corporate Disney plastic-ness".

=== Accolades ===
Awards
Award	Date of ceremony	Category	Recipients	Result
Academy Awards	February 24, 2008	Best Original Song	"Happy Working Song" – Alan Menken and Stephen Schwartz	Nominated
Academy Awards	February 24, 2008	Best Original Song	"So Close" – Alan Menken and Stephen Schwartz	Nominated
Academy Awards	February 24, 2008	Best Original Song	"That's How You Know" – Alan Menken and Stephen Schwartz	Nominated
Costume Designers Guild	February 19, 2008	Excellence in Fantasy Film	Mona May	Nominated
Critics' Choice Movie Awards	January 7, 2008	Best Actress	Amy Adams	Nominated
Critics' Choice Movie Awards	January 7, 2008	Best Film – Family		Won
Critics' Choice Movie Awards	January 7, 2008	Best Composer	Alan Menken	Nominated
Critics' Choice Movie Awards	January 7, 2008	Best Song	That's How You Know – Alan Menken	Nominated
Detroit Film Critics Society	December 21, 2007	Best Actress	Amy Adams	Nominated
Golden Globe Awards	January 13, 2008	Best Actress – Motion Picture Musical or Comedy	Amy Adams	Nominated
Golden Globe Awards	January 13, 2008	Best Original Song	"That's How You Know" – Alan Menken and Stephen Schwartz	Nominated
Golden Trailer Awards	2007	Best Animation/Family Feature Film		Nominated
Grammy Awards	February 8, 2009	Best Song Written for Motion Picture, Television or Other Visual Media	"Ever Ever After"- Alan Menken and Stephen Schwartz	Nominated
Grammy Awards	February 8, 2009	Best Song Written for Motion Picture, Television or Other Visual Media	"That's How You Know" – Alan Menken and Stephen Schwartz	Nominated
Motion Picture Sound Editors	2008	Best Sound Editing: Music in a Musical Feature Film	Kenneth Karman, Jermey Raub and Joanie Diener	Nominated
MTV Movie Awards	June 1, 2008	Best Female Performance	Amy Adams	Nominated
MTV Movie Awards	June 1, 2008	Best Comedic Performance	Amy Adams	Nominated
MTV Movie Awards	June 1, 2008	Best Kiss	Amy Adams and Patrick Dempsey	Nominated
Ohio Film Critics Association	January 11, 2008	Best Actress	Amy Adams	Runner-up
Phoenix Film Critics Society	December 18, 2007	Best Live Action Family Film		Won
Satellite Awards	December 16, 2007	Best Actress – Motion Picture Musical or Comedy	Amy Adams	Nominated
Satellite Awards	December 16, 2007	Best Visual Effects	Thomas Schelesny, Matt Jacobs and Tom Gibbons	Nominated
Saturn Awards	June 24, 2008	Best Fantasy Film		Won
Saturn Awards	June 24, 2008	Best Actress	Amy Adams	Won
Saturn Awards	June 24, 2008	Best Music	Alan Menken	Won
Teen Choice Awards	August 4, 2008	Choice Movie: Chick Flick		Nominated
Teen Choice Awards	August 4, 2008	Choice Movie Actress: Comedy	Amy Adams	Nominated
Teen Choice Awards	August 4, 2008	Choice Movie Actor: Comedy	James Marsden (also for 27 Dresses)	Nominated
Teen Choice Awards	August 4, 2008	Choice Movie: Villain	Susan Sarandon	Nominated
Utah Film Critics Association	December 28, 2007	Best Actress	Amy Adams	Runner-up
Visual Effects Society	February 10, 2008	Outstanding Animated Character in a Live Action Motion Picture	Thomas Schelesny, Matt Jacobs and Tom Gibbons	Nominated

== Disney references ==
According to director Kevin Lima, "thousands" of references are made to past and future works of Disney in Enchanted, which serve as both a parody of and a "giant love letter to Disney classics". It took almost eight years for Walt Disney Studios to greenlight the production of the film because it "was always quite nervous about the tone in particular". As Lima worked with Bill Kelly, the writer, to inject Disney references to the plot, it became "an obsession"; he derived the name of every character as well as anything that needed a name from past Disney films to bring in more Disney references.

While Disney animators have occasionally inserted a Disney character into background shots – for example, Donald Duck appears in a crowd in The Little Mermaid – they have avoided "mingling characters" from other Disney films for fear of weakening their individual mythologies. In Enchanted, characters from past Disney films are openly seen, such as the appearances of Thumper and Flower from Bambi in the 2D animation portion of the film. Disney references are also made through camera work, sets, costumes, music and dialogue. Some of the more familiar examples include the use of poisoned apples from Snow White and the Seven Dwarfs and True Love's Kiss from Snow White and Sleeping Beauty. Dick Cook, the chairman of Walt Disney Studios, admitted that part of the goal of Enchanted was to create a new franchise (through the character of Giselle) and to revive the older ones.

== Sequel ==
A sequel, Disenchanted, was released to Disney+ on November 18, 2022. Directed by Adam Shankman, the sequel sees Adams, Dempsey, Menzel, and Marsden reprising their roles. Newcomer Gabriella Baldacchino replaces Covey as Morgan, though Covey has a brief cameo in the film. They are joined by Maya Rudolph, Jayma Mays, and Yvette Nicole Brown as new characters. The film received mixed reviews from critics.

== See also ==
- List of films about witchcraft
