= Barry Josephson =

American film producer

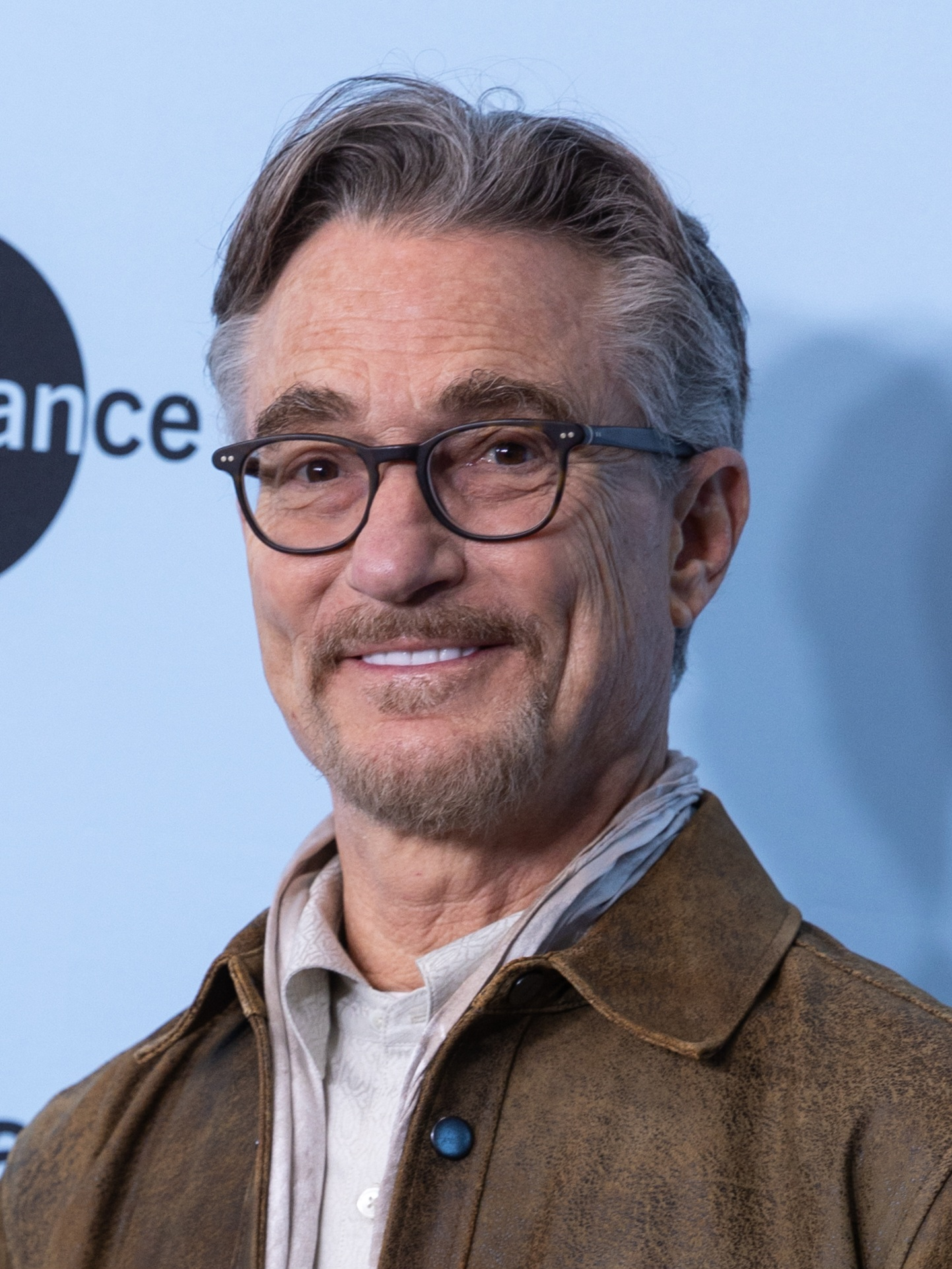
- Josephson in 2025
- Spouse: Jackie Marcus (divorced) Brooke Josephson (m. 2007; sep. 2026)

Barry Josephson is an American film producer and former music manager.

== Life and career ==
After attending the McBurney School in New York City, Josephson graduated from American University, Washington DC in 1978, and was an active member of its American University School of Communication Alumni program. Josephson served as vice president, then President, of Production for Columbia Pictures from 1991 to 1997, and produced films and television for studios and networks such as The Walt Disney Company, 20th Century Fox, Sony Pictures Television, and AMC from 1997 onward.

Josephson began his career in entertainment at Landers/Roberts Productions, overseeing the music division's interest in feature film and television programming and there was involved with the popular sequel, Death Wish II (1982). Josephson later worked for Gallin/Morey & Associates, managing the careers of such performers as Paula Abdul, Patti LaBelle, Morris Day, and Whoopi Goldberg (including production work on her Grammy-winning album "Direct from Broadway"). During this time, Josephson also helped found Sandollar Films, whose production has included several of Dolly Parton's made-for-TV movies and specials; Tidy Endings, an HBO adaptation of Harvey Fierstein's play, Safe Sex; and such feature films as Gross Anatomy and True Identity (both 1989). Before moving to Columbia, Josephson worked with Joel Silver of Silver Pictures on Die Hard 2 and Predator 2 (both 1990), earned executive producer credit on both Ricochet and The Last Boy Scout (both 1991), and oversaw production of 14 episodes of the HBO series, Tales from the Crypt.

In 1991 he became Vice President of Production for Columbia Pictures, where his diverse background in film, TV, and music production came to bear upon the projects he oversaw. He remained at the studio for six years, serving the last three as President of Production. During his tenure at Columbia, Josephson was responsible for such popular films as In the Line of Fire (1993), Bad Boys (1995), Men in Black, Air Force One, The Fifth Element, and Anaconda (all 1997).

In 1997, Josephson, resigning as president at Columbia, entered into a partnership with director Barry Sonnenfeld. The two joined The Walt Disney Company (Touchstone Pictures) as Sonnenfeld Josephson Worldwide Entertainment for a three-year production term, supplanting Barry Sonnenfeld's original partnership with Zachary Feurer at Disney. During this period they produced numerous film and television shows, including Wild Wild West (1999), the Fantasy Island (1998) and The Tick (2001) TV series, Big Trouble (2002), The Crew (2000) and Secret Agent Man (2000).

In 2001 he joined 20th Century Fox under Josephson Entertainment. There he produced the critically acclaimed Enchanted, which garnered two Golden Globe nominations, four Critics' Choice Awards and three Academy Award nominations, and won a Critics' Choice Award for Best Family Film and a Phoenix Film Critics Society Award for Best Live Action Family Film. Other films he has produced include Hide and Seek (2005), Pat Croce: Moving In (2004) TV series, and Like Mike (2002). He acquired the rights in 2011 to make a film based on Julian Assange's autobiography.

Josephson was executive producer of the television series Bones (2005-2017). Most recently, he initiated the television adaptation of Washington's Spies, Alexander Rose's historical account of espionage during the American Revolution. Josephson, along with writer Craig Silverstein, executive-produced the adaptation, Turn: Washington's Spies, for AMC. The series premiered in April 2014.

The producer was a founding member of Comic Relief, the charitable organization which produces comedy concerts hosted by Robin Williams, Billy Crystal and Whoopi Goldberg in order to raise funds to help America's homeless and others in need. Josephson has also played pivotal roles in the creation of the HBO Aspen Comedy Festival, the Commitment to Life Benefit (supporting AIDS Project Los Angeles), and the Heart of Austin Film Festival.

In February 2026, Josephson's correspondence with Jeffrey Epstein were released, as part of the January 30th Epstein files dump by the Justice Department. Including a message forwarded to an unknown recipient by Epstein, which prompted a response from the unknown recipient about the elimination of "poor people as a whole", in document EFTA01156952.

== Filmography ==
He was a producer in all films unless otherwise noted.

=== Film ===
Year	Film	Credit
1991	Ricochet	Executive producer
1991	The Last Boy Scout	Executive producer
1999	Wild Wild West	Executive producer
2000	The Crew	
2002	Big Trouble	
2002	Like Mike	
2004	The Ladykillers	
2005	Hide and Seek	
2007	Enchanted	
2009	Aliens in the Attic	
2010	Life as We Know It	
2014	Someone Marry Barry	
2016	Dirty Grandpa	
2022	Disenchanted	
2025	Kiss of the Spider Woman	

Thanks

Year	Film	Role
1994	Swimming with Sharks	Special thanks

=== Television ===
Year	Title	Credit	Notes
1987	An Evening with Bobcat Goldthwait: Share the Warmth	Executive producer	Television special
1989	The Diceman Cometh	Executive producer	Television special
1989	Rick Ducommun: Piece of Mind	Executive producer	Television special
1990	Parker Kane		Television film
1991−92	Tales from the Crypt	Co-producer	
1998	Maximum Bob	Executive producer	
1998−99	Fantasy Island	Executive producer	
1999	Partners	Executive producer	Television film
2000	Secret Agent Man	Executive producer	
2001−02	The Tick	Executive producer	
2004	The Great Domestic Showdown		Television film
2004	Pat Croce: Moving In	Executive producer	
2005−17	Bones	Executive producer	
2005	Head Cases	Executive producer	
2007	Nurses	Executive producer	Television film
2012	The Finder	Executive producer	
2012	Scent of the Missing	Executive producer	Television film
2014−15	Turn: Washington's Spies	Executive producer	
2015	Edge	Executive producer	Television pilot
2016−19	The Tick	Executive producer	
2017−19	Ultraviolet	Executive producer	

As an actor

Year	Title	Role
2013	On Story	—N/a

As writer

Year	Title
2000	Secret Agent Man

Miscellaneous crew

Year	Title	Role
2019	On Story	Moderator

Thanks

Year	Title	Role
2012−16	On Story	Special thanks
