= Rachel Covey =

American actress

- Born: June 15, 1998 (age 28)
- Education: Northwestern University
- Occupations: playwright; composer
- Years active: 2005–present
- Website: raecovey.com

Rachel Covey (born June 15, 1998) is an American playwright and composer.

As a child actress, she was known for her roles in the 2005 film Duane Hopwood alongside David Schwimmer and the 2007 Disney movie Enchanted alongside Patrick Dempsey and Amy Adams. For her role in the latter film, she received a nomination for "Young Actress Age Ten or Younger" at the 29th Young Artist Awards. Her first musical, Painting Faye Salvez, joined the New York Musical Festival (NYMF) in July, 2017 Her second musical, Noise, received a workshop production at The Tank in 2022. Her work has been performed at Joe's Pub, Utah's Tuacahn Theater, and other venues.

== Career ==
In 2005, Covey appeared in the film Duane Hopwood as Katie Hopwood, the daughter of David Schwimmer's character.

In 2007, she appeared in the Disney film Enchanted as Morgan Philip, the young daughter of Patrick Dempsey's character. For Covey's performance in the film, she received a nomination for "Young Actress Age Ten or Younger" at the 29th Young Artist Awards, but lost to Bailee Madison from Bridge to Terabithia.

In 2014, Covey joined the cast of the Radio City Spectacular, Heart and Lights, though the production was delayed and subsequently rewritten.

Painting Faye Salvez, a full-length musical written and scored by Covey, joined the New York Musical Festival (NYMF)'s 2017 Festival. Covey was also listed in Playbill's "11 Women Creatives You Need to Know at NYMF This Year." Noise, Covey's second full-length musical received an off-Broadway run at The Tank in 2022.

Although she was no longer pursuing acting by the time Disenchanted, the sequel to Enchanted, was filmed, Covey made a cameo in the film as a native of Monrolasia.

== Personal life ==
Covey was born on June 15, 1998. She graduated from The Dalton School in 2016 and Northwestern University in 2020.

== Filmography ==
=== Film ===
Year	Film	Role
2005	Duane Hopwood	Kate
2007	Enchanted	Morgan Phillip
2022	Disenchanted	Monrolasia girl

=== Television ===
Year	Television	Role	Notes
2016	What Would You Do?	Bullied teen	Episode: "Drunk Cab Driver"
