= Bill Kelly (writer) =

American screenwriter

- Born: Elk Grove Village, Illinois, U.S.
- Occupation: Screenwriter
- Years active: 1995–present

Bill Kelly (born in Elk Grove Village, Illinois) is an American screenwriter. He is best known for writing the Disney film Enchanted.

== Filmography ==
- 2007: Enchanted
- 2007: Premonition
- 1999: Blast from the Past
