= Disenchanted (soundtrack) =

2022 soundtrack album by Alan Menken and Stephen Schwartz

Disenchanted (Original Soundtrack)

Soundtrack album by Alan Menken and Stephen Schwartz
- Released: November 18, 2022
- Recorded: 2021–2022
- Studios: Newman Scoring Stage, 20th Century Studios, Los Angeles
- Genres: Film score; soundtrack
- Length: 49:41
- Label: Walt Disney
- Producers: Alan Menken; Stephen Schwartz; Matt Sullivan

Alan Menken chronology
Aladdin (2019)	Disenchanted (Original Soundtrack) (2022)	Beauty and the Beast: A 30th Celebration (2022)

Singles from Disenchanted (Original Soundtrack)
- 1. "Love Power (End Credits Version)" Released: November 17, 2022

Disenchanted (Original Soundtrack) is the soundtrack to the 2022 film of the same name directed by Adam Shankman. The sequel to Enchanted (2007), the film's original music included songs written and produced by composer Alan Menken and lyricist Stephen Schwartz, both of whom wrote the music for the first film. Menken also composed the incidental underscore for the film. Menken's longtime collaborator Michael Kosarin conducted the songs and score. Unlike the first film's soundtrack, the sequel was intended to have more songs, and all those tracks were performed by the film's cast members, including Amy Adams, Patrick Dempsey, James Marsden, Idina Menzel, Gabriella Baldacchino, Maya Rudolph, Griffin Newman, James Monroe Iglehart, Ann Harada, and Michael McCorry Rose.

The album features 14-tracks, with the end credits version of "Love Power", sung by Menzel, released as a single on November 17, 2022. The soundtrack album was released by Walt Disney Records a day later on November 18, 2022, alongside the film's release on Disney+ and received praise for the musical numbers.

== Background ==
In January 2018, director Adam Shankman revealed that the film would feature more songs than that of the first film. By that March, Shankman revealed that Alan Menken and Stephen Schwartz, who scored music for Enchanted (2007) would return for the sequel, while in April 2020, Menken said that he and Schwartz are writing the film's songs. On the film's music, Menken had said "we start in the world of early Walt [Disney] animation, and this animated princess has a spell put on her and is thrown into Times Square, where she's totally unequipped to deal with what happens. The score grows up with her, as she begins to adapt to this world. And in the new version, she longs for that world. There's no happily ever after in our world, unlike in an animated ending, and she longs for that, so she makes this wish that throws us into this amazing storyline, which has all this fun in it because of what happens from that wish." Menken added that instead of writing for the music for the individual actors, he and Schwartz wrote for the characters and storyline, hence the songs and themes fit well with the actors.

In an interview with Variety magazine in late April 2021, Patrick Dempsey revealed that he will be singing. In May 2021, Schwartz said that the film will have seven songs and reprises, including two songs for Nancy (played by Idina Menzel). Menken had recalled in a November 2022 interview, that Menzel had two songs for Enchanted which were cut from the film. The score and song underscoring of the film was recorded at the Newman Scoring Stage on August 29, 2022, with Matt Sullivan working on the scoring process.

An interview with Entertainment Weekly revealed that one of the songs, sung by Giselle (played by Amy Adams), would be called "Fairy Tale Life", and that one of Nancy's songs will be called "Love Power". Adams, who recorded the track during her quarantine period had described on returning to her character, and recall singing, saying that "Giselle has such a music to her voice. She still definitely has the Giselle-isms, but when we meet her in the first movie, she's just so of the world of Andalasia. When we meet her in this movie, she hasn't lost her magic, but she's definitely lived in this world now for a period of time. But she still is Giselle — and magic, it's still there."

The soundtrack includes extended versions of "Andalasia", "Even More Enchanted" (the extended version is also heard over the end credits), "The Magic of Andalasia" (the cut verse was previously shown in the trailer), and "Love Power".

== Release ==
During "Disney+ Night" on Dancing with the Stars, host Tyra Banks announced the soundtrack for Disenchanted would be released on November 18, 2022. On November 16, 2022, Menzel announced that the end credits version of the song "Love Power" would be released on the following day. Walt Disney Records released the soundtrack digitally on November 18, followed by a physical release on December 9.

== Track listing ==
All songs are composed by Alan Menken with lyrics by Stephen Schwartz. All scores composed and produced by Menken. All songs produced by Menken, Schwartz, Michael Kosarin, Frank Wolf, and Matt Sullivan except track 14 produced by Lindgren and Ryan Tedder

No.	Title	Performer(s)	Length
1.	"Andalasia"	Griffin Newman	4:30
2.	"Even More Enchanted"	Amy Adams	2:57
3.	"The Magic of Andalasia"	James Marsden & Idina Menzel	2:54
4.	"Fairytale Life (The Wish)"	Adams	2:54
5.	"Fairytale Life (After the Spell)"	Adams, Gabriella Baldacchino, Patrick Dempsey & the Disney Chorus	4:03
6.	"Perfect"	Baldacchino, Ann Harada, James Monroe Iglehart & Michael McCorry Rose	3:14
7.	"Badder"	Adams & Maya Rudolph	3:21
8.	"Love Power"	Menzel	4:16
9.	"Love Power (Reprise)"	Adams	1:50
10.	"Even More Enchanted" (Finale)	Adams & the Disney Chorus	1:37
11.	"Disenchanted Score Suite"	Alan Menken	7:44
12.	"Hard Time for Heroes" (Demo)	Dempsey, Harada, Iglehart & Rose	3:47
13.	"Something Different This Year" (Demo)	Baldacchino & Kolton Stewart	3:36
14.	"Love Power" (End Credits Version)	Menzel	2:58
Total length:			49:41

== Additional music ==
In addition to the original songs, the album features five songs from the predecessor: "True Love's Kiss", "Happy Working Song", "That's How You Know", "Mustering the Vermin" and "Ever Ever After". The film also features two songs from the animated film Beauty and the Beast (1991): "Be Our Guest" and "Beauty and the Beast".

== Reception ==
Alexander Navarro of MovieWeb mentioned the soundtrack as "joyful". Amelia Emberwing of IGN "the music in Disenchanted doesn't have the same kind of timeless feel as Enchanted did and there's only so much the renowned Idina Menzel's Nancy can do with silly lyrics". Reviewing for PhilStar Life, Marielle Fatima Tuazon wrote "New songs are added to the repertoire with most of the cast singing, making for a well-rounded soundtrack we're yet to see if it's able to hold a candle to the classic Enchanted songs of our childhood."

Jen Chaney of Vulture, opined on the film's music saying: "The songs have that same quality. "I've got a feeling that maybe today / Just 'round that corner or out by the bay / Some kind of change could be coming my way," sings Baldachinno as Morgan. She sounds lovely, but nothing about the lyrics she's crooning matches the wry, self-aware quality that made the music in Enchanted such a delight. These songs, like so much in Disenchanted, aren't mocking Disney tunes so much as melodically touching on all the tropes in Disney movies. But simply acknowledging those tropes isn't the same as lightheartedly mocking them, which is what Enchanted did so brilliantly."

Marya E. Gates of RogerEbert.com wrote "Longtime collaborators Alan Menken and Stephen Schwartz know the formula for the perfect Disney song, having nabbed three Oscar nominations for their work on "Enchanted." Here each song serves its purpose for the narrative, but there is nary a catchy earworm. There is one showstopper, performed by Menzel, who did not sing in the previous film. Her song "Love Power" may have a woefully generic name, but her voice is as powerful and spine-tinglingly beautiful as ever." About the song "Fairytale Life", Gates mentioned "the song here is wonderfully bittersweet, with Adams bringing a tinge of sorrow to her shining voice". However, Ross Bonaime of Collider said "Even though the film reunites the Enchanted team of Alan Menken and Stephen Schwartz, the songs feel like a combination of overused platitudes and obvious statements, even though the pair do have fun throwing in some Disney references—and a few Disney Broadway stars in for good fun." Kevin Maher of The Times called the songs as "screechy and generic".

== Charts ==
Chart performance for Disenchanted (Original Soundtrack)
Chart (2022)	Peak position
UK Album Downloads (OCC)	79
US Kid Albums (Billboard)	13

== Release history ==
Release dates and formats for Disenchanted (Original Soundtrack)
Region	Date	Format(s)	Label	Ref.
Various	November 18, 2022	Digital download; streaming	Walt Disney	
Various	December 9, 2022	CD	Walt Disney	
