= Happy Working Song =

2007 song by Alan Menken and Stephen Schwartz

Song by Amy Adams

from the album Enchanted
- Released: November 20, 2007
- Recorded: 2007
- Genre: Show tune
- Length: 2:09
- Label: Walt Disney
- Composer: Alan Menken
- Lyricist: Stephen Schwartz
- Producers: Alan Menken; Stephen Schwartz; Robbie Buchanan

"Happy Working Song" is a song written by composer Alan Menken and lyricist Stephen Schwartz for Walt Disney Pictures' musical film Enchanted (2007). Recorded by American actress Amy Adams in her starring role as Giselle, the uptempo pop song both parodies and pays homage to a variety of songs from several Disney animated feature films, particularly "Whistle While You Work" from Snow White and the Seven Dwarfs (1937). Produced by Menken, Schwartz and Danny Troob, the song appears on the film's soundtrack, Enchanted (Soundtrack from the Motion Picture).

"Happy Working Song" takes place in Robert's untidy apartment in Manhattan, New York, in which Giselle spends her first night in the city after having been magically transported there from the fictional Andalasia. The next morning, Giselle awakens to find the apartment in a state of neglect and decides to clean it, summoning several animals to her aid. Additionally, the musical number references similar scenes from Disney's Snow White and the Seven Dwarfs and Cinderella (1950). Based on 1950s music, "Happy Working Song"'s bridge deliberately references the song "Belle" from Disney's Beauty and the Beast (1991).

Musically, "Happy Working Song" shares similarities with the songs "Heigh-Ho" from Snow White and the Seven Dwarfs, "The Work Song" from Cinderella and "Something There" from Beauty and the Beast. The song has garnered vastly positive reviews, with both film and music critics praising its humorous, witty lyrics, allusions and references to previous Disney films and songs, as well as Adams' performance. "Happy Working Song" was nominated for the Academy Award for Best Original Song at the 80th Academy Awards in 2008 alongside Enchanted's own "That's How You Know" and "So Close", making the film one of only four to achieve this feat. Ultimately, the song lost to "Falling Slowly" from Once (2007), while the Academy of Motion Picture Arts and Sciences subsequently decided to limit the total number of Best Original Song nominations to only two per film.

== Background, writing and references ==
Veteran Disney composer, Alan Menken, became actively creatively involved with Enchanted in 2006, subsequently inviting his longtime collaborator, lyricist Stephen Schwartz, with whom Menken had previously worked on Disney's Pocahontas (1995) and The Hunchback of Notre Dame (1996), to co-write the songs and musical numbers for Enchanted alongside him. Menken said of the general songwriting process, "the first challenge for us was finding that musical palette and lyrical palette and performance palette that really spoke to everybody and said that we are in the world of early Walt and to have that place to start."

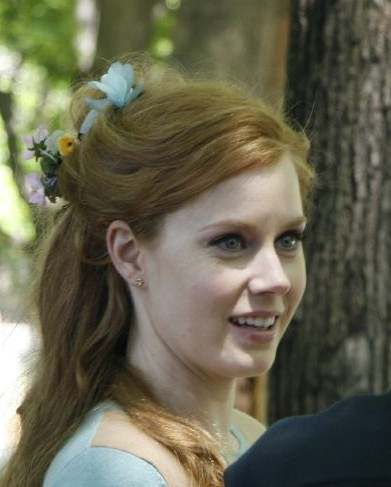
Actress Amy Adams in costume as the live-action rendition of her character Giselle on the set of Enchanted. Adams utilized a Broadway musical-style voice when recording "Happy Working Song".

When it came to writing "Happy Working Song", Menken and Schwartz were directly influenced by the song "Whistle While You Work" from Disney's first full-length animated feature film Snow White and the Seven Dwarfs (1937), with Schwartz describing "Happy Working Song" as a "spoof" and "one of the funniest sequences of the film". According to Schwartz, "Happy Working Song" was written rather quickly, having come "[to the songwriters] really fast". Schwartz elaborated, "'Happy Working Song' is ... pretty much out of Snow White and 'Whistle While You Work' and that little thing where they do the dishes and Dopey with the soap bubbles and everything." In addition to this, "Happy Working Song" features references to both the musical number "The Work Song" and "the busy little mice" from Disney's Cinderella (1950), but to a significantly lesser extent. Lyrically, Schwartz decided to approach the song comically as demonstrated by its phrase "Even though you are vermin."

Conceptually, Menken explained that "As the characters become sort of three dimensional, songs become more contemporary." Ultimately, Menken believes that, melodically, "Happy Working Song" is very much similar to the songs "Belle" and "Something There" from Beauty and the Beast. Additionally, orchestrator and arranger Danny Troob revealed the bridge of "Happy Working Song" is directly based on the bridge of "Belle", particularly serving as "a deliberate reference on [the songwriters'] part." Addressing the musical similarities between "Happy Working Song" and "Something There", Troob explained that the former occupies a different "drive" and "attitude", additionally sounding "a little bit more brisk ... because [Giselle is] working." Troob elaborated, "Beauty and the Beast was, for its time, very forward-looking, and 'Happy Working Song' is deliberately retro." Troob decided to alter and deliberately steer the song away from Menken and Schwartz's original 1970s-inspired musical arrangement in an attempt to "make it feel like the 1950s" by "manipulating instruments [sic] textures."

American actress, Amy Adams, who portrays Giselle, had previously "worked in musical theater before [she] moved to Los Angeles" in order to pursue a career as a film actress, and was therefore "very comfortable with the idea of singing". Citing both actress and singer Julie Andrews and several Disney Princesses as musical inspiration, Adams decided to perform the film's first song, "True Love's Kiss", in the style of an operetta before eventually replacing this with a more Broadway musical-style voice for "Happy Working Song".

== Context, scene and analysis ==
Having just recently arrived in New York City after having been magically transported there from her fantastical world of Andalasia, a lost and hopelessly confused Giselle is discovered wandering around by Robert, a single father and divorce attorney, and his daughter Morgan. Robert decides to offer his assistance to Giselle by inviting her to spend a night's shelter in the safety of their apartment. The following morning, Giselle awakens to find Robert's apartment in a complete state of disarray. During the "Happy Working Song" musical sequence, described as one of the film's "large scale production numbers", Giselle, who is very much appalled by the untidy state of Robert's Manhattan apartment, decides to "repay ... the favour" by taking the liberty of confronting and cleaning up the apartment's mess herself. By performing a brief aria and "utilizing her animal-charming abilities", Giselle musically "summons the city's animals" in order "to help her tidy it up". This gesture and scene serves as a reference to similar scenes and musical sequences from preceding Disney animated fairy tale films such as Snow White and the Seven Dwarfs (1937) and Cinderella (1950).

Demonstrating and suggesting "that Giselle really does have some magical power, even in [the real world]", – according to Sean Axmaker of the Seattle Post-Intelligencer, "When she breaks into song ... sewer rats and cockroaches arrive to help with the housework" – the aria is immediately responded to by several animals, creatures and "vermin" typically associated with New York City, including rats, pigeons, roaches, and flies – visually meant to represent "makeshift 'forest friends'" – "as opposed to the woodland critters of the movie's opening animated segment." According to film critic Brent Simon of Shared Darkness, the comedic gag serves as one of the film's "amusing ways to contrast the two worlds" of Giselle's fictional Andalasia and the real-life New York City.

Several professional film critics have allotted a variety of different terms and nicknames to the animals who appear during the "Happy Working Song" sequence. Neil Smith of BBC Online described the animals who appear during the scene as "a grotesque menagerie of CG vermin", while the Orlando Sentinel's Roger Moore jokingly referred to them as New York's own "woodland creatures", writing, "the rats and pigeons are merely the cuddlier ones". Manohla Dargis of The New York Times coined the creatures "urban critters."

== Composition and inspiration ==
"Happy Working Song" is a "vibrant", uptempo pop song. Reminiscent of and influenced by a variety of "archetypal Disney" and "classical-sounding" musical numbers, the musical theater-inspired song runs a total length of two minutes and nine seconds. Incorporating into its lyrical structure a variety of "clever" words including "toilet", "hairball" and "vermin", while rhyming humorous terms such as "hum" and "scum" with "dum dum dum" and "vacu-um", "Happy Working Song"'s use of "comical", "tongue-in-cheek lyrics", according to Filmtracks.com, both describe and add narration to Giselle's "attempts to conjure an ultra happy tune while scrubbing floors and toilets in the real world" upon deciding "to clean her new home with the help of ... cockroaches and flies". Its musical instrumentation is heavily reliant on the use of the harpsichord, with Filmtracks.com additionally describing "Happy Working Song" as a "harpsichord-laced" song. Troob purposefully included the harpsichord in the song's instrumentation and orchestration in order to provide it with a more accurate "period setting".

According to Common Sense Media, "Happy Working Song" shares similarities with and is also inspired by "Heigh-Ho" from Snow White and the Seven Dwarfs, in addition to "Whistle While You Work" from Snow White and the Seven Dwarfs and "The Work Song" from Cinderella. Additionally, the song is reminiscent of "Belle" and "Something There" from Beauty and the Beast, specifically when it comes to its bridge and "staccato quality". Written in the key of D major in alla breve cut common time, "Happy Working Song" is structured around a "lilting", Broadway musical-inspired melody. According to the song's official sheet music, published at Musicnotes.com by Walt Disney Music Publishing, "Happy Working Song" follows an upbeat, "perky and live" tempo of 88 beats per minute. In portrayal of Giselle, Adams performs the song using an "earnest", "tart ... soprano voice". Her high soprano vocal range spans approximately two octaves, from the low note of G♯_{3} to the high note of D_{5}. The song's lyrics begin, "Come, my little friends, as we all sing a happy little working song, merry little voices clear and strong."

== Reception ==
=== Critical reviews ===
"Happy Working Song" has garnered widespread critical acclaim. Filmtracks.com hailed "Happy Working Song" as Menken and Schwartz's "best work together in Enchanted" Describing "Happy Working Song" as a "loving, well-crafted homage ... to Disney classics", Elisabeth Vincentelli of Amazon.com wrote, "tellingly, the lovely 'Happy Working Song' ... sounds like it could have been lifted from any number of Disney movies—and that's meant as a compliment." Drawing similarities between the song and "Heigh-Ho", Jacqueline Rupp of Common Sense Media commented, "the 'Hi-Ho'[sic]-inspired 'Happy Working Song' will have kids giggling and dancing." Jeff Swindoll of Monsters and Critics wrote that "Happy Working Song" successfully "ap[es]'Whistle While You Work' most amusingly." The New York Times' Manohla Dargis called "Happy Working Song" "brilliantly surrealistic".

The hilarious "Happy Working Song" production number ... encapsulates the joys of Enchanted — an unironic affection for classic Disney fairy tales of old, salted with modern smarts about how the non-Disney world really works for single parents, kids, working women, divorce lawyers, and cockroaches.

— Film critic Lisa Schwarzbaum of Entertainment Weekly's very positive review of "Happy Working Song".

Lisa Schwarzbaum of Entertainment Weekly described "Happy Working Song" as a "hilarious ... production number" that successfully "encapsulates the joys of Enchanted". The Wall Street Journal's Joe Morgenstern enthusiastically praised both the song and the sequence, hailing the latter as "magical" while describing "Happy Working Song" as a "gleeful variation on theme of 'Whistle While You Work'". Similarly, Todd McCarthy of Variety called "Happy Working Song" "a hilarious variation on 'Whistle While You Work'". Sun Media's Kevin Williamson hailed the musical number as one of the film's "stand-outs", elaborating, "[']Happy Working Song[' is] a crowd-pleaser." The Mountain Xpress' Ken Hanke allotted particular praise to Adams', writing that when the actress is "singing her 'Happy Working Song' with her makeshift 'forest friends' ... she is the perfect cartoon heroine made flesh". Kerry Lengel of The Arizona Republic jokingly lauded "Happy Working Song" as "the funniest - and grossest - set piece in the film." Calling the sequence the "film's highlight", Carrie Rickey of The Philadelphia Inquirer commented, "The song, like the movie, is cheerfully gross enough to get boys - and their fathers - into theater seats for a story every tween and her mother will love."

Film critics who generally disliked Enchanted tended to have mostly positive things to report about "Happy Working Song". Peter Bradshaw of The Guardian, who assigned the film a negative score of two out of five stars, in contrast gave "Happy Working Song" a positive review, describing it as "a funny opening song". Additionally, Bradshaw drew similarities between the musical number and scenes from Snow White and the Seven Dwarfs and Disney's Mary Poppins (1964).

One of the song's few negative reviews was written by Mary F. Pols of the Contra Costa Times, who opined, "a cleaning crew of vermin and cockroaches is just real enough to be crass rather than funny".

Empire ranked "Happy Working Song" third on its list of the "10 Great Musical Numbers" of the decade, writing that although "Shrek set the benchmark for Disney song parodies at Everest levels ... it's Amy Adams calling on New York's creatures of the forest to tidy up Patrick Dempsey's apartment that pulls it off to perfection."

=== Academy Award nomination and aftermath ===
"Happy Working Song" was nominated for the Academy Award for Best Original Song at the 80th Academy Awards in 2008 alongside Enchanted songs "That's How You Know" and "So Close", ultimately dominating the category. However, the song was generally not favored to win by the media in spite of the fact that it was vastly a critical success. According to a poll conducted by Billboard in anticipation of the ceremony, when the magazine asked 155 of its readers "Who gets your vote for best original song in a motion picture at the Academy Awards?"; only 5% of them voted in favor of "Happy Working Song" winning the award while 10% voted for "So Close" and 24% voted for "That's How You Know". In addition to this, 6% of readers voted for August Rush's "Raise It Up" and 22% voted for Glen Hansard and Marketa Irglova's "Falling Slowly" from Once (2007). Ultimately, "Happy Working Song" lost to "Falling Slowly". Menken believes that his compositions did not win the Best Original Song award because three of them had been nominated at once.

Famously, Enchanted became the fourth out of only four films in the history of the Academy Awards to receive three separate Academy Award nominations in the Best Original Song category, having been preceded by Disney's own Beauty and the Beast and The Lion King (1994) at the 64th and 67th Academy Awards in 1992 and 1995, respectively, and Dreamgirls (2006) at the 79th Academy Awards in 2007. In anticipation of the 81st Academy Awards occurring the following year in 2009, the Academy of Motion Picture Arts and Sciences ultimately decided to prohibit and prevent this rare feat from reoccurring at upcoming ceremonies by limiting the maximum number of Best Original Song nominations from any one film to a total of only two per film.

== Live performance and Kristin Chenoweth controversy ==
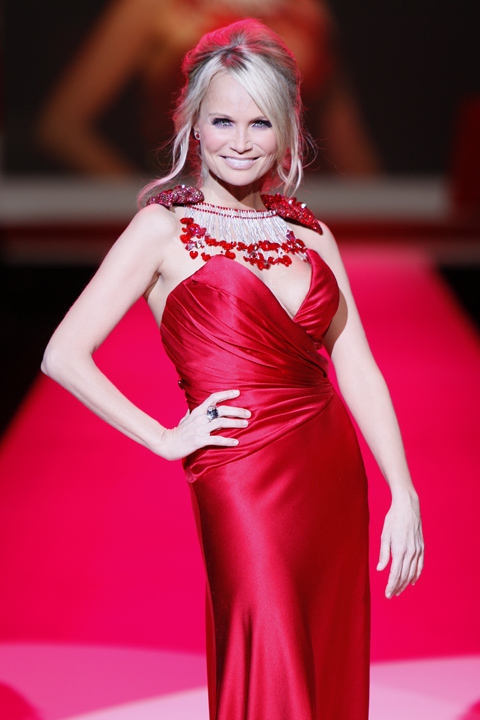
The decision to have Kristin Chenoweth perform "That's How You Know" was met with some mild criticism and controversy.

Adams' first live performance of "Happy Working Song" was at the 80th Academy Awards ceremony in 2008. Performing at approximately 6:01 pm local time, Adams was reportedly very nervous during and after her performance, revealing to The Huffington Post, "I don't know how I did that. It's the thing that was the most terrifying that I've ever done, and the thing I'm most proud of in my career." Subsequently, Adams told Vulture.com that she would likely perform at the Academy Awards again "As long as [she] wasn't doing it by [her]self".

Adams' live rendition of "Happy Working Song" was generally well-received by critics. George Lang of The Oklahoman described it as a "perky" performance, additionally commenting, "[Adams is] great ... and she should have already racked up her first Oscar for acting by now." The Boston Globe's Wesley Morris wrote, "Watching Amy Adams sing ... makes you appreciated [sic] the magic of the movies." However, the performance generated some mild controversy revolving around the fact that while Adams was selected to perform "Happy Working Song", Broadway actress and singer Kristin Chenoweth was hired to sing "That's How You Know" live at the ceremony. When questioned about this, Disney executives told the Los Angeles Times that "it's best [Adams] sing 'Happy Working Song' because it has so many parallels to Julie Andrews in Mary Poppins".

However, some critics and journalists have argued that the decision stemmed from Disney and the Academy of Motion Picture Arts and Sciences' belief that Adams, predominantly a film actress, would ultimately not be able to perform "That's How You Know" as adequately as the more experienced Chenoweth. Additionally, critics noted that while Chenoweth's Academy Award performance was staged and choreographed as a large, extravagant number featuring "dozens of colorfully costumed dancers", Adams performed by herself on a mostly barren stage highlighted by a "single spotlight". Vulture.com commented about the performance, "Adams didn't do terribly, but she's no Broadway star, and we felt kind of awful for her." During an interview, Adams told the New York Post that she was not upset by the Academy's decision, instead feeling that "That's How You Know" was "perfect" for Chenoweth to perform.
