= 80th Academy Awards =

- Official poster by Drew and Christian Struzan
- Date: February 24, 2008
- Site: Kodak Theatre; Hollywood, Los Angeles, California, U.S.
- Hosted by: Jon Stewart
- Preshow hosts: Samantha Harris; Regis Philbin; Shaun Robinson
- Produced by: Gil Cates
- Directed by: Louis J. Horvitz

Highlights
- Best Picture: No Country for Old Men
- Most awards: No Country for Old Men (4)
- Most nominations: No Country for Old Men and There Will Be Blood (8)

TV in the United States
- Network: ABC
- Duration: 3 hours, 21 minutes
- Ratings: 31.7 million; 18.7% (Nielsen ratings)

The 80th Academy Awards ceremony, presented by the Academy of Motion Picture Arts and Sciences (AMPAS), honored the best films of 2007. The award ceremony took place on February 24, 2008, at the Kodak Theatre in Hollywood, Los Angeles. During the ceremony, AMPAS presented Academy Awards (commonly referred to as Oscars) in 24 categories. The ceremony was televised in the United States by ABC, and produced by Gil Cates and directed by Louis J. Horvitz. Comedian Jon Stewart hosted the show for the second time, having previously presided over the 78th ceremony held in 2006. On February 9, at the Beverly Wilshire Hotel in Beverly Hills, the Academy Awards for Technical Achievement were presented by host Jessica Alba.

No Country for Old Men won four awards, including Best Picture. Other winners included The Bourne Ultimatum with three awards, La Vie en Rose and There Will Be Blood with two, and Atonement, The Counterfeiters, Elizabeth: The Golden Age, Freeheld, The Golden Compass, Juno, Michael Clayton, Le Mozart des Pickpockets, Once, Peter & the Wolf, Ratatouille, Sweeney Todd: The Demon Barber of Fleet Street, and Taxi to the Dark Side with one. The telecast garnered 31 million viewers, making it the least watched Oscar broadcast since 1974, when Nielsen began keeping records of viewership.

== Winners and nominees ==
The nominations were announced on January 22, 2008, at the Samuel Goldwyn Theater in Beverly Hills, California by Sid Ganis, president of the Academy, and actress Kathy Bates. No Country for Old Men and There Will Be Blood tied for the most nominations with eight each. Cate Blanchett became the eleventh performer to receive two acting nominations in the same year, as well as being the first actress and fifth performer overall to be nominated for portraying the same character in two different films, by virtue of her nomination for her role as Elizabeth I of England in Elizabeth: The Golden Age (she had previously been nominated for playing Elizabeth I in 1998's Elizabeth). At age 82, Best Supporting Actor nominee Hal Holbrook became the oldest male acting nominee in Oscar history at the time.

Best Director winners Joel and Ethan Coen became the second pair of directors to win the award for the same film, after Jerome Robbins and Robert Wise for 1961's West Side Story). This was the second time in Oscar history that none of the four acting winners was American (the first being the 37th Academy Awards). Daniel Day-Lewis became the eighth person to win Best Actor twice, while Best Actress winner Marion Cotillard became the fifth person to win for a non-English language performance, the second Best Actress winner to do so after Sophia Loren (1961's Two Women), and the first to win for a French-language performance. Robert F. Boyle became the oldest recipient of the Academy Honorary award at the age of 98.

=== Awards ===
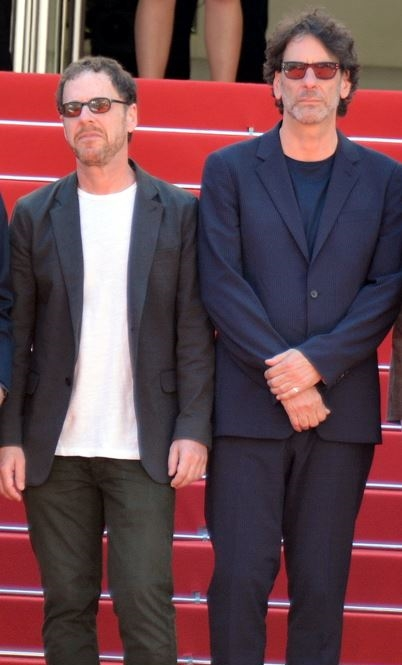
Coen brothers, Best Picture, Best Director and Best Adapted Screenplay winners

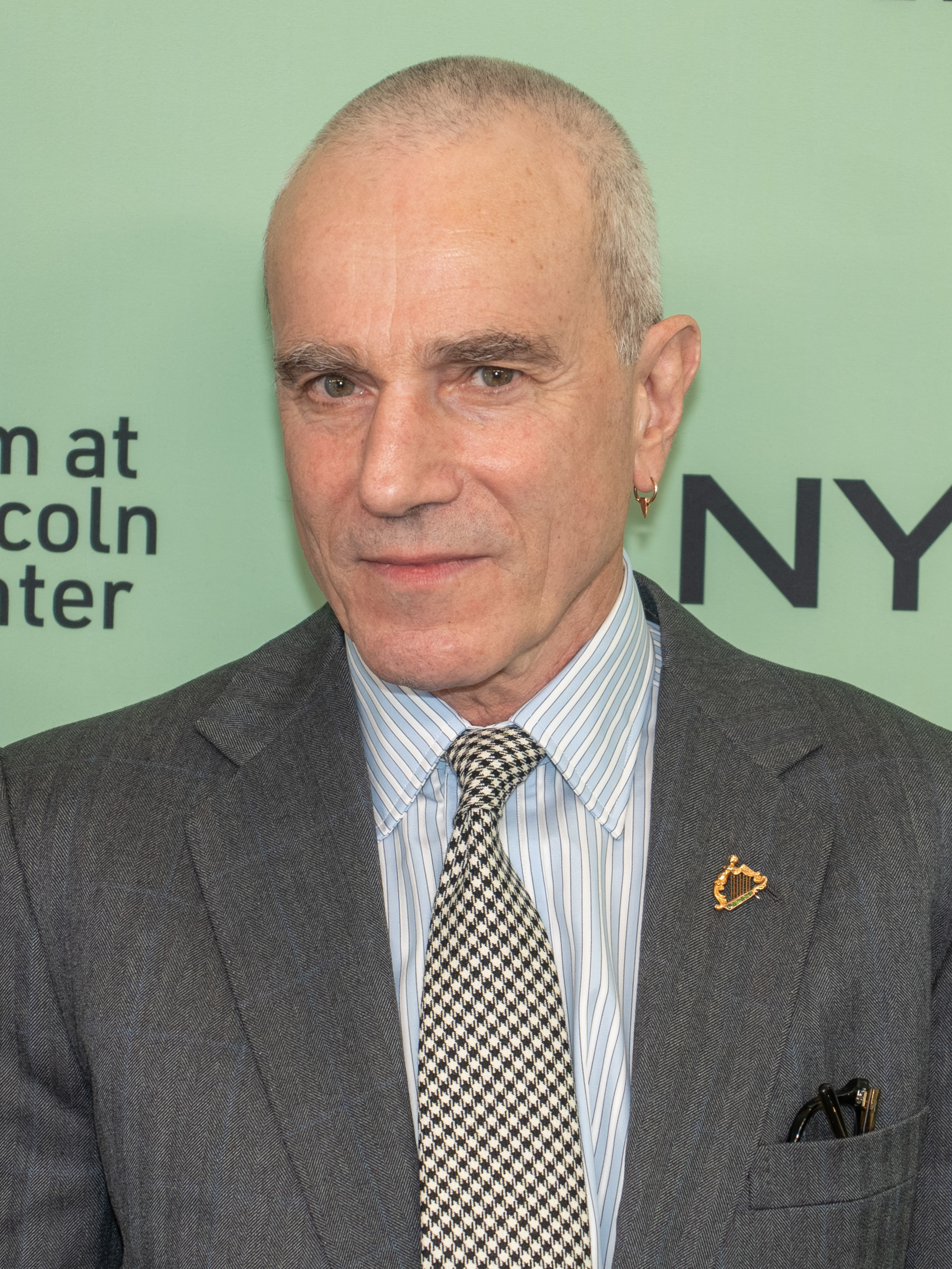
Daniel Day-Lewis, Best Actor winner

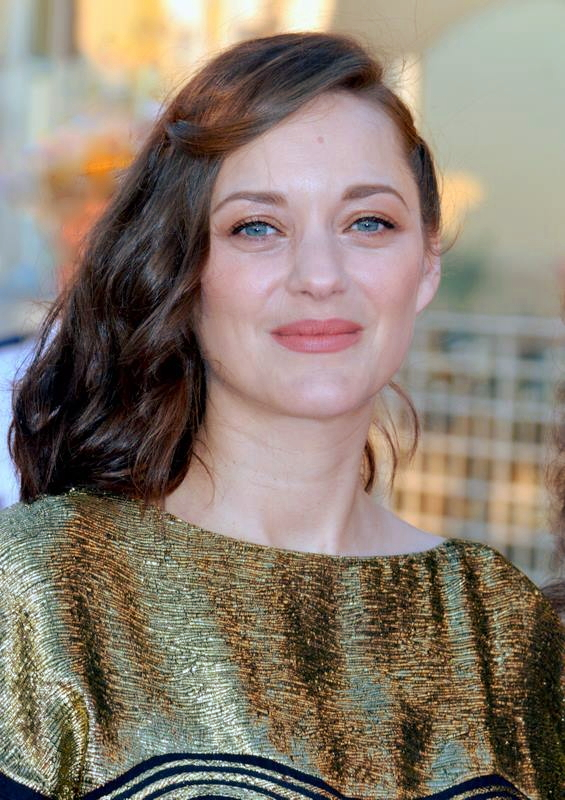
Marion Cotillard, Best Actress winner

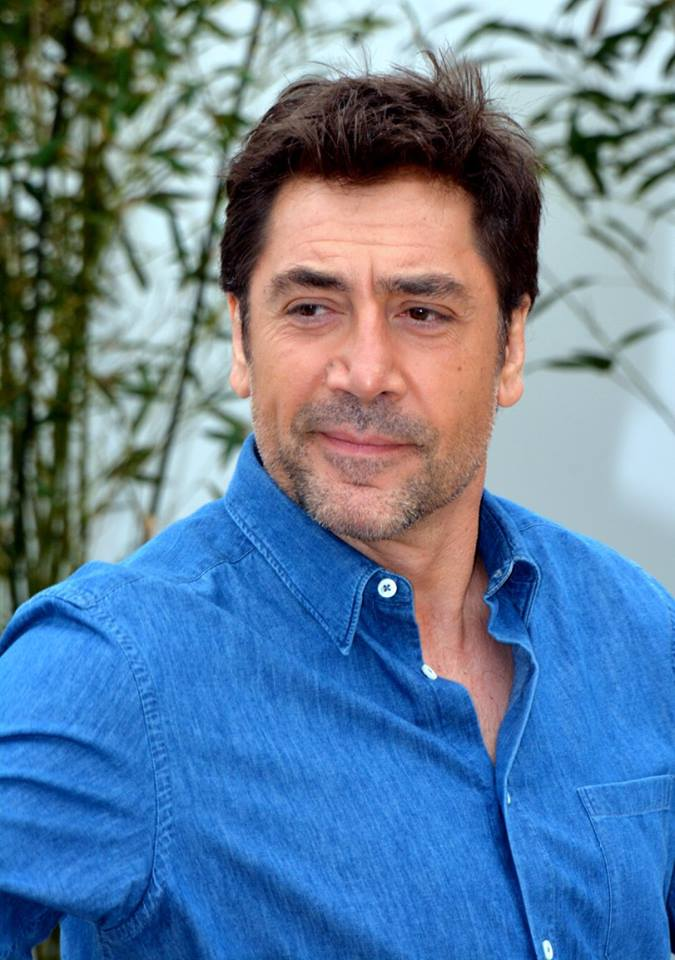
Javier Bardem, Best Supporting Actor winner

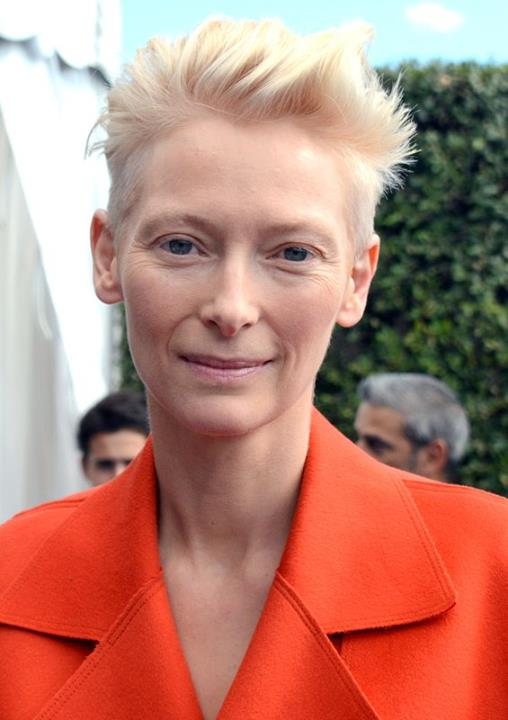
Tilda Swinton, Best Supporting Actress winner

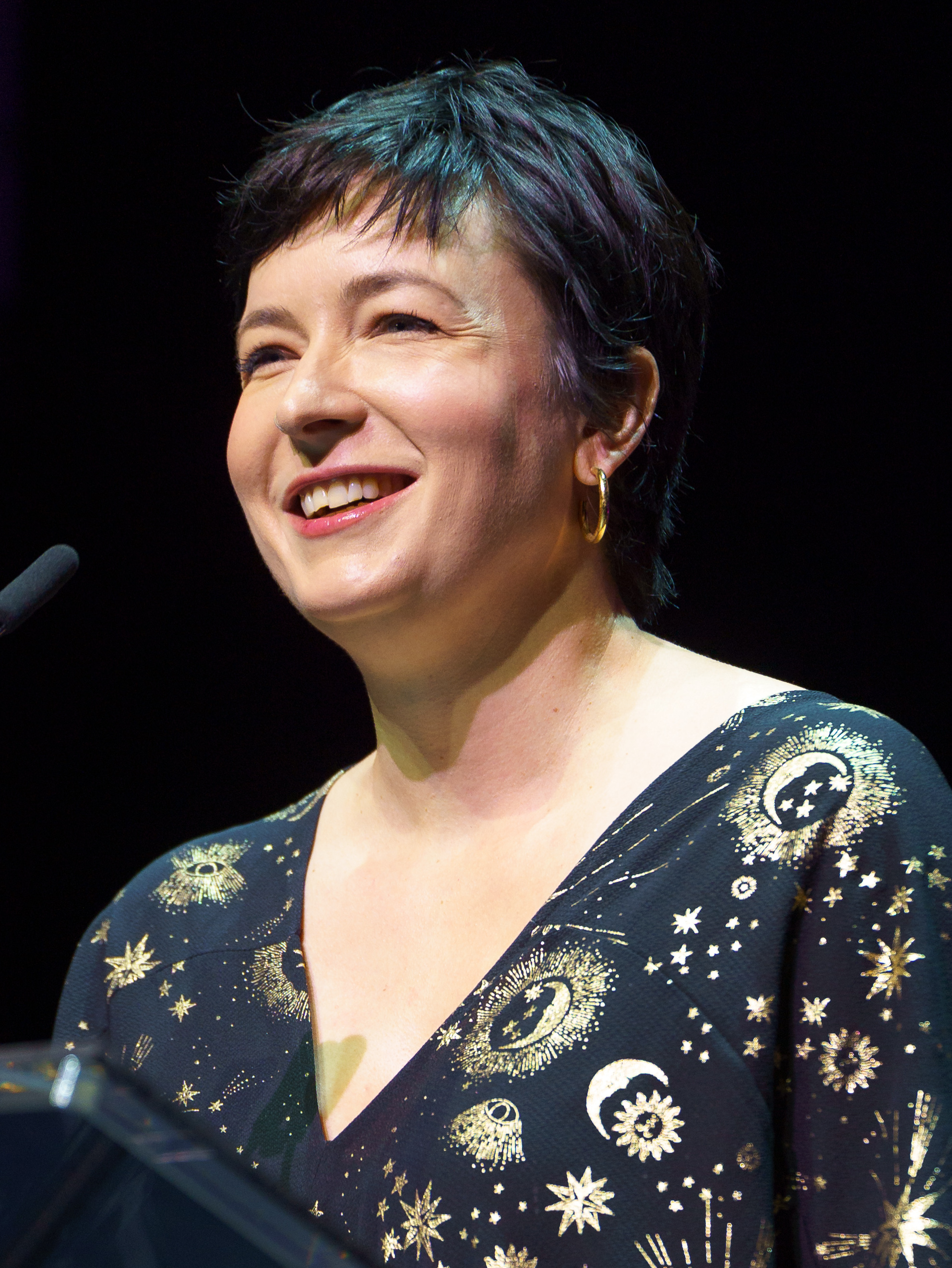
Diablo Cody, Best Original Screenplay winner

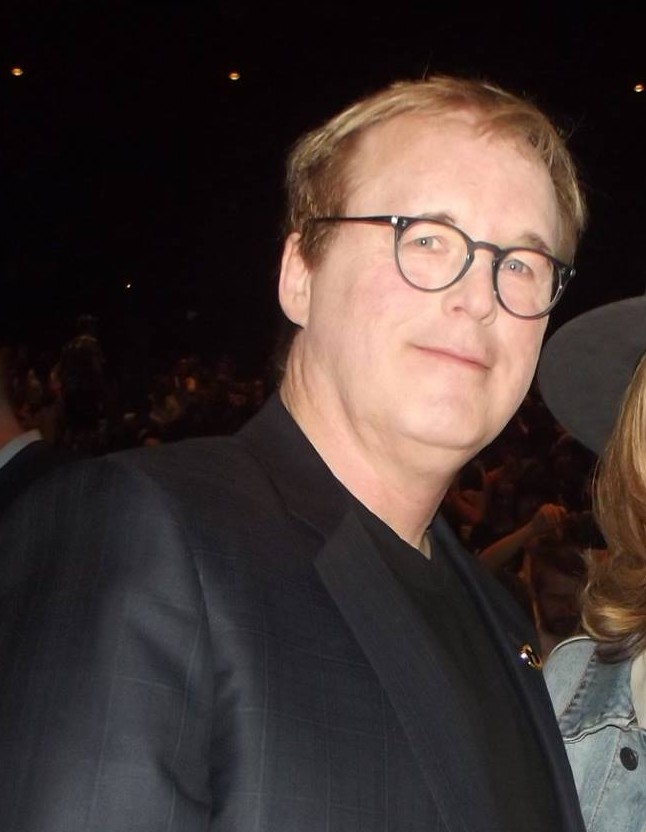
Brad Bird, Best Animated Feature winner

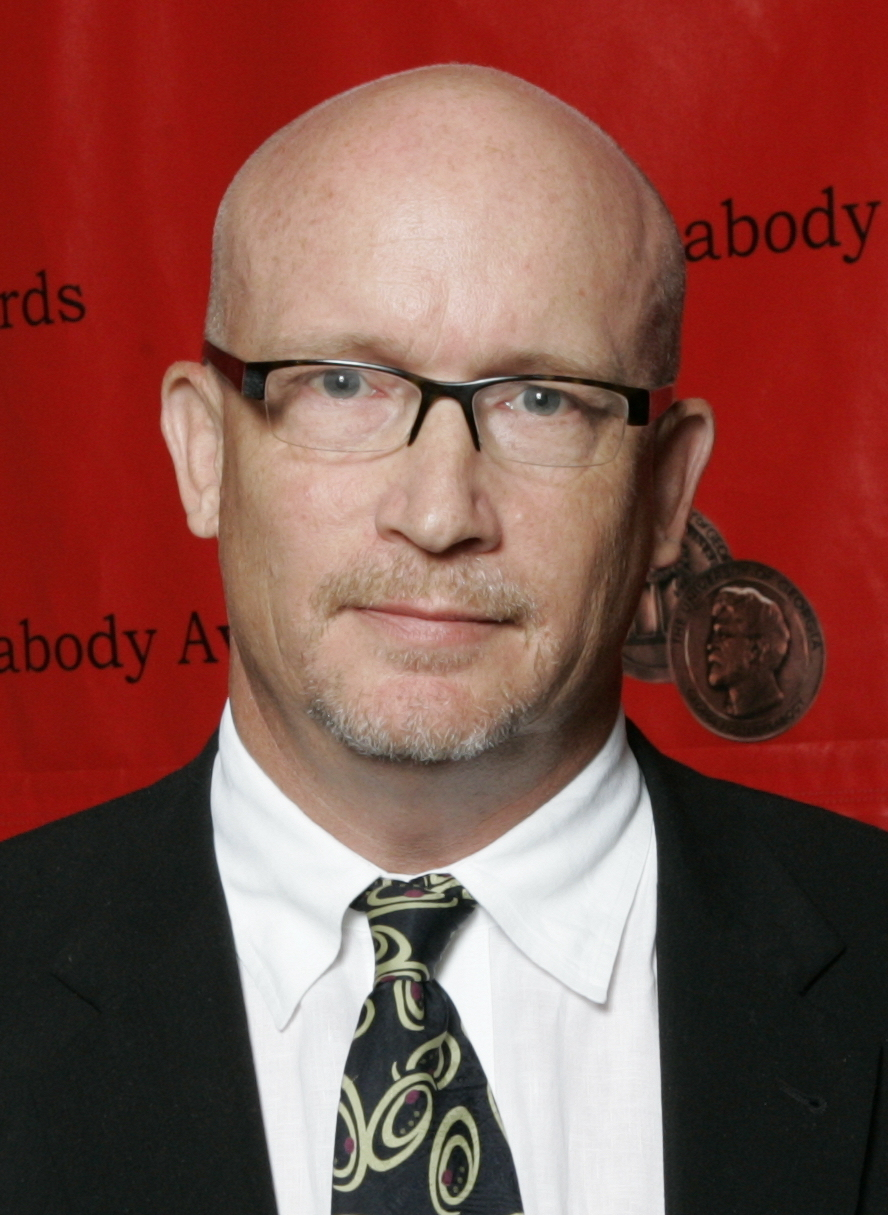
Alex Gibney, Best Documentary Feature co-winner

Winners are listed first, highlighted in boldface, and indicated with a double dagger (‡).

**Best Picture**: **No Country for Old Men – Scott Rudin, Ethan Coen and Joel Coen, producers**‡; Atonement – Tim Bevan, Eric Fellner and Paul Webster, producers; Juno – Lianne Halfon, Mason Novick and Russell Smith, producers; Michael Clayton – Sydney Pollack, Jennifer Fox and Kerry Orent, producers; There Will Be Blood – JoAnne Sellar, Paul Thomas Anderson and Daniel Lupi, producers	**Best Directing**: **Joel Coen and Ethan Coen – No Country for Old Men**‡; Julian Schnabel – The Diving Bell and the Butterfly; Jason Reitman – Juno; Tony Gilroy – Michael Clayton; Paul Thomas Anderson – There Will Be Blood
**Best Actor in a Leading Role**: **Daniel Day-Lewis – There Will Be Blood as Daniel Plainview**‡; George Clooney – Michael Clayton as Michael Clayton; Johnny Depp – Sweeney Todd: The Demon Barber of Fleet Street as Benjamin Barker / Sweeney Todd; Tommy Lee Jones – In the Valley of Elah as Hank Deerfield; Viggo Mortensen – Eastern Promises as Nikolai Luzhin	**Best Actress in a Leading Role**: **Marion Cotillard – La Vie en Rose as Édith Piaf**‡; Cate Blanchett – Elizabeth: The Golden Age as Queen Elizabeth I; Julie Christie – Away from Her as Fiona Anderson; Laura Linney – The Savages as Wendy Savage; Elliot Page (Note: Nominated as Ellen Page. Page underwent a gender transition and name change in 2020.) – Juno as Juno MacGuff
**Best Actor in a Supporting Role**: **Javier Bardem – No Country for Old Men as Anton Chigurh**‡; Casey Affleck – The Assassination of Jesse James by the Coward Robert Ford as Robert Ford; Philip Seymour Hoffman – Charlie Wilson's War as Gust Avrakotos; Hal Holbrook – Into the Wild as Ron Franz; Tom Wilkinson – Michael Clayton as Arthur Edens	**Best Actress in a Supporting Role**: **Tilda Swinton – Michael Clayton as Karen Crowder**‡; Cate Blanchett – I'm Not There as Jude Quinn; Ruby Dee – American Gangster as Mama Lucas; Saoirse Ronan – Atonement as Briony Tallis; Amy Ryan – Gone Baby Gone as Helene McCready
**Best Writing (Original Screenplay)**: **Juno – Diablo Cody**‡; Lars and the Real Girl – Nancy Oliver; Michael Clayton – Tony Gilroy; Ratatouille – Screenplay by Brad Bird; Story by Jan Pinkava, Jim Capobianco and Brad Bird; The Savages – Tamara Jenkins	**Best Writing (Adapted Screenplay)**: **No Country for Old Men – Joel Coen and Ethan Coen based on the novel by Cormac McCarthy**‡; Atonement – Christopher Hampton based on the novel by Ian McEwan; Away from Her – Sarah Polley based on the short story "The Bear Came Over The Mountain" by Alice Munro; The Diving Bell and the Butterfly – Ronald Harwood based on the memoir by Jean-Dominique Bauby; There Will Be Blood – Paul Thomas Anderson based on the novel Oil! by Upton Sinclair
**Best Animated Feature Film**: **Ratatouille – Brad Bird**‡; Persepolis – Marjane Satrapi and Vincent Paronnaud; Surf's Up – Ash Brannon and Chris Buck	**Best Foreign Language Film**: **The Counterfeiters (Austria) in German – Stefan Ruzowitzky**‡; 12 (Russia) in Russian – Nikita Mikhalkov; Beaufort (Israel) in Hebrew – Joseph Cedar; Katyń (Poland) in Polish – Andrzej Wajda; Mongol (Kazakhstan) in Russian – Sergei Bodrov
**Best Documentary (Feature)**: **Taxi to the Dark Side – Alex Gibney and Eva Orner**‡; No End in Sight – Charles H. Ferguson and Audrey Marrs; Operation Homecoming: Writing the Wartime Experience – Richard E. Robbins; Sicko – Michael Moore and Meghan O'Hara; War/Dance – Andrea Nix Fine and Sean Fine	**Best Documentary (Short Subject)**: **Freeheld – Cynthia Wade and Vanessa Roth**‡; La Corona – Amanda Micheli and Isabel Vega; Salim Baba – Tim Sternberg and Francisco Bello; Sari's Mother – James Longley
**Best Short Film (Live Action)**: **Le Mozart des Pickpockets (The Mozart of Pickpockets) – Philippe Pollet-Villard**‡; At Night – Christian E. Christiansen and Louise Vesth; (Il Supplente) The Substitute – Andrea Jublin; Tanghi Argentini – Guido Thys and Anja Daelemans; The Tonto Woman – Daniel Barber and Matthew Brown	**Best Short Film (Animated)**: **Peter & the Wolf – Suzie Templeton and Hugh Welchman**‡; Even Pigeons Go to Heaven (Même les pigeons vont au paradis) – Samuel Tourneux and Simon Vanesse; I Met the Walrus – Josh Raskin; Madame Tutli-Putli – Chris Lavis and Maciek Szczerbowski; My Love (Moya Lyubov) – Alexander Petrov
**Best Music (Original Score)**: **Atonement – Dario Marianelli**‡; 3:10 to Yuma – Marco Beltrami; The Kite Runner – Alberto Iglesias; Michael Clayton – James Newton Howard; Ratatouille – Michael Giacchino	**Best Music (Original Song)**: **"Falling Slowly" from Once – Music and Lyrics by Glen Hansard and Markéta Irglová**‡; "Happy Working Song" from Enchanted – Music by Alan Menken; Lyrics by Stephen Schwartz; "Raise It Up" from August Rush – Music and Lyrics by Jamal Joseph, Charles Mack and Tevin Thomas; "So Close" from Enchanted – Music by Alan Menken; Lyrics by Stephen Schwartz; "That's How You Know" from Enchanted – Music by Alan Menken; Lyrics by Stephen Schwartz
**Best Sound Editing**: **The Bourne Ultimatum – Karen Baker Landers and Per Hallberg**‡; No Country for Old Men – Skip Lievsay; Ratatouille – Randy Thom and Michael Silvers; There Will Be Blood – Christopher Scarabosio and Matthew Wood; Transformers – Ethan Van der Ryn and Mike Hopkins	**Best Sound Mixing**: **The Bourne Ultimatum – Scott Millan, David Parker and Kirk Francis**‡; 3:10 to Yuma – Paul Massey, David Giammarco and Jim Stuebe; No Country for Old Men – Skip Lievsay, Craig Berkey, Greg Orloff and Peter Kurland; Ratatouille – Randy Thom, Michael Semanick and Doc Kane; Transformers – Kevin O'Connell, Greg P. Russell and Peter J. Devlin
**Best Art Direction**: **Sweeney Todd: The Demon Barber of Fleet Street – Art Direction: Dante Ferretti; Set Decoration: Francesca Lo Schiavo**‡; American Gangster – Art Direction: Arthur Max; Set Decoration: Beth Rubino; Atonement – Art Direction: Sarah Greenwood; Set Decoration: Katie Spencer; The Golden Compass – Art Direction: Dennis Gassner; Set Decoration: Anna Pinnock; There Will Be Blood – Art Direction: Jack Fisk; Set Decoration: Jim Erickson	**Best Cinematography**: **There Will Be Blood – Robert Elswit**‡; The Assassination of Jesse James by the Coward Robert Ford – Roger Deakins; Atonement – Seamus McGarvey; The Diving Bell and the Butterfly – Janusz Kamiński; No Country for Old Men – Roger Deakins
**Best Makeup**: **La Vie en Rose – Didier Lavergne and Jan Archibald**‡; Norbit – Rick Baker and Kazuhiro Tsuji; Pirates of the Caribbean: At World's End – Ve Neill and Martin Samuel	**Best Costume Design**: **Elizabeth: The Golden Age – Alexandra Byrne**‡; Across the Universe – Albert Wolsky; Atonement – Jacqueline Durran; La Vie en Rose – Marit Allen (posthumous nomination); Sweeney Todd: The Demon Barber of Fleet Street – Colleen Atwood
**Best Film Editing**: **The Bourne Ultimatum – Christopher Rouse**‡; The Diving Bell and the Butterfly – Juliette Welfling; Into the Wild – Jay Cassidy; No Country for Old Men – Roderick Jaynes; There Will Be Blood – Dylan Tichenor	**Best Visual Effects**: **The Golden Compass – Michael L. Fink, Bill Westenhofer, Ben Morris and Trevor Wood**‡; Pirates of the Caribbean: At World's End – John Knoll, Hal Hickel, Charles Gibson and John Frazier; Transformers – Scott Farrar, Scott Benza, Russell Earl and John Frazier

=== Honorary Award ===
- To Robert Boyle in recognition of one of cinema's great careers in art direction.

=== Films with multiple nominations and awards ===
The following 21 films received multiple nominations:

Nominations	Film
8	No Country for Old Men
8	There Will Be Blood
7	Atonement
7	Michael Clayton
5	Ratatouille
4	The Diving Bell and the Butterfly
4	Juno
3	The Bourne Ultimatum
3	Enchanted
3	La Vie en Rose
3	Sweeney Todd: The Demon Barber of Fleet Street
3	Transformers
2	3:10 to Yuma
2	American Gangster
2	The Assassination of Jesse James by the Coward Robert Ford
2	Away from Her
2	Elizabeth: The Golden Age
2	The Golden Compass
2	Into the Wild
2	Pirates of the Caribbean: At World's End
2	The Savages

The following four films received multiple awards:

Awards	Film
4	No Country for Old Men
3	The Bourne Ultimatum
2	La Vie en Rose
2	There Will Be Blood

== Presenters and performers ==
The following individuals presented awards or performed musical numbers.

=== Presenters ===
Name(s)	Role
Tom Kane; Randy Thomas	Co-announcers for the 80th annual Academy Awards
Jennifer Garner	Presenter of the award for Best Costume Design
George Clooney	Presenter of the Academy Awards history montage
Steve Carell; Anne Hathaway	Presenters of the award for Best Animated Feature Film
Katherine Heigl	Presenter of the award for Best Makeup
Jon Stewart	Introducer of the performance of Best Original Song nominee "Happy Working Song"
Dwayne Johnson	Presenter of the award for Best Visual Effects
Cate Blanchett	Presenter of the award for Best Art Direction
Jennifer Hudson	Presenter of the award for Best Supporting Actor
Keri Russell	Introducer of the performance of Best Original Song nominee "Raise It Up"
Owen Wilson	Presenter of the award for Best Live Action Short Film
Barry B. Benson	Presenter of the award for Best Animated Short Film
Alan Arkin	Presenter of the award for Best Supporting Actress
Jessica Alba	Presenter of the segment of the Scientific and Technical Awards and the Gordon E. Sawyer Award
Josh Brolin; James McAvoy	Presenters of the award for Best Adapted Screenplay
Sid Ganis	Presenter of a special segment explaining the Oscar selection process
Miley Cyrus	Introducer of the performance of Best Original Song nominee "That's How You Know"
Jonah Hill; Seth Rogen	Presenters of the awards for Best Sound Editing and Best Sound Mixing
Forest Whitaker	Presenter of the award for Best Actress
Colin Farrell	Introducer of the performance of Best Original Song nominee "Falling Slowly"
Jack Nicholson	Presenter of the Best Picture winners montage
Renée Zellweger	Presenter of the award for Best Film Editing
Nicole Kidman	Presenter of the Honorary Academy Award to Robert F. Boyle
Penélope Cruz	Presenter of the award for Best Foreign Language Film
Patrick Dempsey	Introducer of the performance Best Original Song nominee of "So Close"
John Travolta	Presenter of the award for Best Original Song
Cameron Diaz	Presenter of the award for Best Cinematography
Hilary Swank	Presenter of the "In Memoriam" segment
Amy Adams	Presenter of the award for Best Original Score
Tom Hanks; Spc. Charles Highland; Sgt. Andrea Knudsen; Officer 3rd Class Joseph Smith; Lt. Curtis Williamson; Sgt. Kenji Thuloweit	Presenter of the award for Best Documentary Short Subject
Tom Hanks	Presenter of the award for Best Documentary Feature
Harrison Ford	Presenter of the award for Best Original Screenplay
Helen Mirren	Presenter of the award for Best Actor
Martin Scorsese	Presenter of the award for Best Director
Denzel Washington	Presenter of the award for Best Picture

=== Performers ===
Name(s)	Role	Performed
Bill Conti	Musical Arranger; Conductor	Orchestral
Amy Adams	Performer	"Happy Working Song" from Enchanted
Impact Repertory Theatre; Jamia Simone Nash	Performers	"Raise It Up" from August Rush
Kristin Chenoweth; Marlon Saunders	Performers	"That's How You Know" from Enchanted
Glen Hansard; Markéta Irglová	Performers	"Falling Slowly" from Once
Jon McLaughlin	Performer	"So Close" from Enchanted

== Ceremony information ==
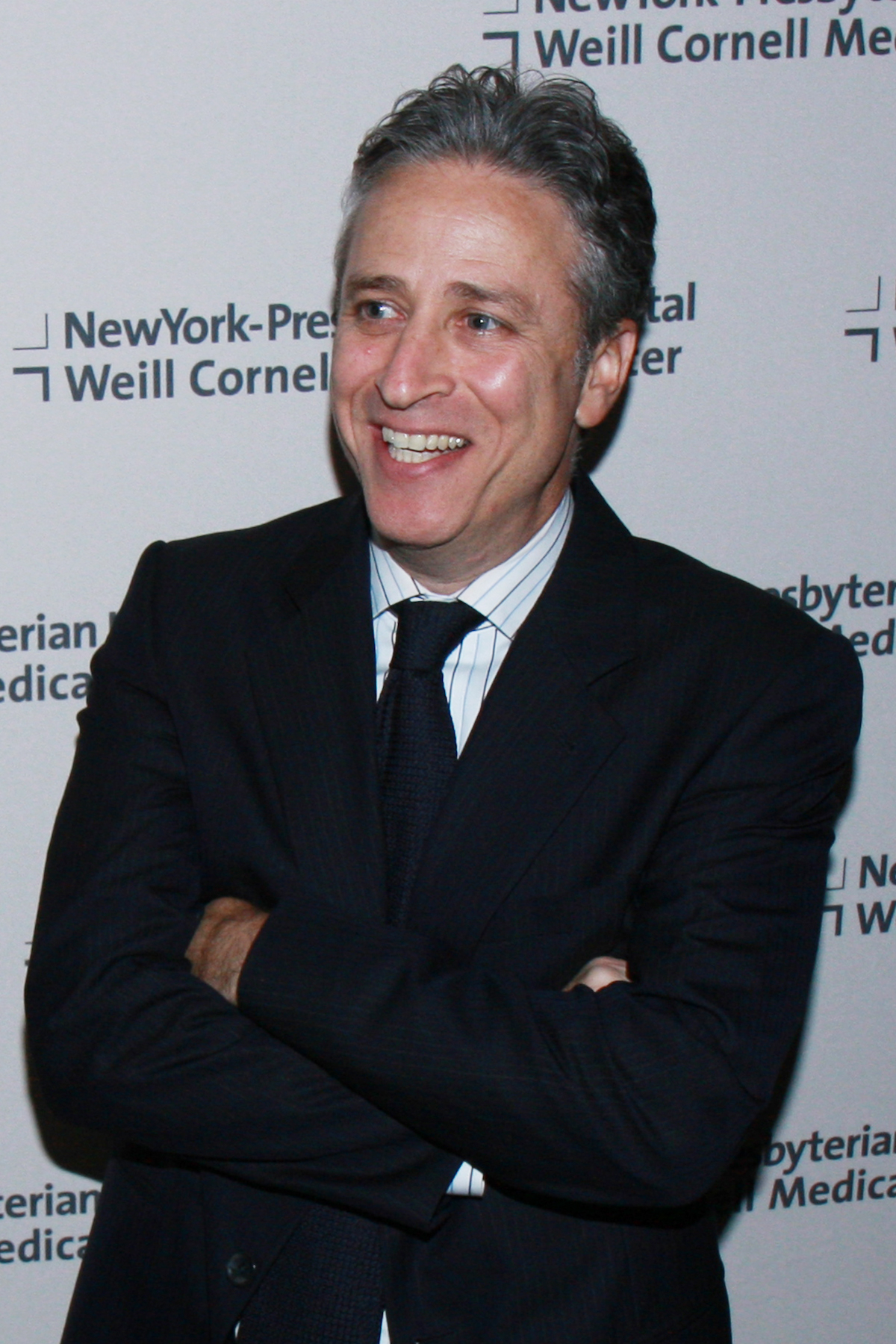
Jon Stewart hosted the 80th Academy Awards.

In September 2007, the Academy hired Gil Cates to oversee production of the telecast for a record 14th time. Ganis explained his decision to hire Cates as producer stating, "He's so talented...so creative and inventive, and so enormously passionate about the Oscars. All of that will again translate into a night that people can't wait to experience." Immediately, Cates selected actor, comedian, and talk-show host Jon Stewart as host of the 2008 ceremony. "Jon was a terrific host for the 78th Awards," Cates said about Stewart in a press release. "He is smart, quick, funny, loves movies and is a great guy. What else could one ask for?"

Furthermore, the 2007–08 Writers Guild of America strike affected the telecast and its surrounding events. Over a month after the labor dispute began, the striking Writers Guild of America (WGA) denied a waiver requested by the Academy of Motion Picture Arts and Sciences in connection with film clips and excerpts from previous award ceremonies to be shown at the 2008 awards. The material could have been used, as the denial only affected the conditions under which the clips are shown. Previously, the 60th ceremony held in 1988 occurred 37 days after that year's writers strike began. At the time, material was already completed in anticipation for the strike, and actors were in full attendance of the ceremony.

In anticipation that the strike would continue through Oscar night, AMPAS developed a Plan B show that would not have included actors accepting their awards. It would have included the musical numbers, but would have relied heavily on historic film clips, emphasizing the 80th anniversary of the awards. However, both the WGA and Alliance of Motion Picture and Television Producers (AMPTP) reached an agreement effectively ending the strike on February 12, 2008, and the ceremony proceeded under its normal format.

=== Box office performance of nominated films ===
Continuing a trend in recent years, the field of major nominees favored independent, low-budget films over blockbusters. The combined gross of the five Best Picture nominees when the Oscars were announced was $217 million; the average gross per film was $43.3 million.

None of the five Best Picture nominees was among the top ten releases in box office during the nominations. When the nominations were announced on January 22, Juno was the highest earner among the Best Picture nominees with $87.1 million in domestic box office receipts. The film was followed by No Country for Old Men ($48.9 million), Michael Clayton ($39.4 million), Atonement ($32.7 million), and finally There Will Be Blood ($8.7 million).

Out of the top 50 grossing movies of the year (prior to announcement), 29 nominations went to 12 films on the list. Only Ratatouille (9th), American Gangster (18th), Juno (31st), Charlie Wilson's War (39th), and Surf's Up (41st) received nominations for Best Picture, Best Animated Feature, directing, acting, or screenwriting. The other top-50 box office hits that earned nominations were Transformers (3rd), Pirates of the Caribbean: At World's End (4th), The Bourne Ultimatum (7th), Enchanted (20th), Norbit (29th), The Golden Compass (37th), and 3:10 to Yuma (45th).

=== Critical reviews ===
The show received a mixed reception from media publications. Some media outlets were more critical of the show. The Washington Post television critic Tom Shales quipped that the ceremony was "Overstocked with clips from movies -- from this year's nominees and from Oscar winners going back to 1929 -- that it was like a TV show with the hiccups." Columnist James Poniewozik of Time commented that Stewart was "an Oscar host–sometimes a funny one, but a pretty conventional one, whose routine was loaded up with kiss-up softballs about how hot Colin Farrell is, what range Cate Blanchett has and what a tomcat Jack Nicholson is." Of the show itself, he wrote, "What we got instead was a show that half the time seemed like the show the Academy would have put on if there had been a strike, chockful of montages. The other half of the time, it was an typical-to-dull Oscars." Columnist Robert Bianco of USA Today said, "Has it ever felt like more of a padded bore than it did Sunday night? If so, blame the writers' strike, which left the producers with only a few weeks to prepare for the ABC broadcast and persuaded them to lean less on the host and more on old clips." He also observed that numerous film montages seemed to diminish Stewart's job as host.

The majority of other media outlets received the broadcast more positively. Television critic Matthew Gilbert of the Boston Globe gave an average critique of the ceremony but praised Stewart writing that "It was good to see Jon Stewart being Jon Stewart. He is shaping up to be a dependable Oscar host for the post-Billy Crystal years. He's not musical, but he's versatile enough to swing smoothly between jokes about politics, Hollywood, new media, and, most importantly, hair." Variety columnist Brian Lowry lauded Stewart's performance noting that he "earned his keep by maintaining a playful, irreverent tone throughout the night, whether it was jesting about Cate Blanchett's versatility or watching Lawrence of Arabia on an iPhone screen." Frazier Moore from the Associated Press commended Stewart's improvement from his first hosting stint commenting, "He proved equal to the challenge posed by Oscarcast's quick turnaround. His crash-deadline material worked. And even when it didn't, he was genial, relaxed, and seemed utterly at home." In addition, he quipped that although there was a lack of surprise amongst the winners, he marveled "The evening was plenty elegant. The stage setting was handsome. The orchestra sounded full and lush. Everyone behaved."

=== Ratings and reception ===
The American telecast on ABC drew in an average of 32 million people over its length, which was a 21% decrease from the previous year's ceremony. An estimated 64 million total viewers watched all or part of the awards. The show also earned lower Nielsen ratings compared to the previous ceremony with 18.7% of households watching over a 29 share. In addition, it garnered a lower 18–49 demo rating with a 10.7 rating over a 26 share among viewers in that demographic. Many media outlets pointed out that the Writers Guild strike and the niche popularity amongst the field of major nominees contributed to the low ratings. It earned the lowest viewership for an Academy Award telecast since figures were compiled beginning with the 46th ceremony in 1974.

In July 2008, the ceremony presentation received nine nominations at the 60th Primetime Emmy Awards. Two months later, the ceremony won two of those nominations for Outstanding Art Direction (Roy Christopher and Joe Celli) and Outstanding Directing for a Variety, Music, or Comedy Program (Louis J. Horvitz).

== "In Memoriam" ==
The annual In Memoriam tribute, presented by actress Hilary Swank, honored the following people:

- Roscoe Lee Browne – Actor
- Barry Nelson – Actor
- Kitty Carlisle Hart – Actress, TV personality
- Betty Hutton – Actress
- Calvin Lockhart – Actor
- Jane Wyman – Actress
- Melville Shavelson – Writer
- Curtis Harrington – Director
- Jack Valenti – Executive
- Michael Kidd – Dancer
- Michelangelo Antonioni – Director
- Delbert Mann – Director
- Montague "Monty" G. Westmore – Makeup artist
- Peter T. Handford – Sound
- Bud Ekins – Stuntman
- Bernard Gordon – Writer
- Dabbs Greer – Actor
- Jean-Claude Brialy – Actor
- Harold Michelson – Art director
- Laraine Day – Actress
- Jean-Pierre Cassel – Actor
- Lois Maxwell – Actress
- László Kovács – Cinematographer
- Robert Clark – Director
- George Jenkins – Art director
- Johnny Grant – Executive
- Frank E. Rosenfelt – Executive
- Martin Manulis – Producer
- Donfeld – Costume designer
- Sembène Ousmane – Director
- Freddy Fields – Agent
- Robert Lantz – Agent
- Ray Kurtzman – Executive
- Miyoshi Umeki – Singer, actress
- Suzanne Pleshette – Actress
- Deborah Kerr – Actress
- Peter Ellenshaw – Visual effects
- Peter Zinner – Film editor
- Freddie Francis – Cinematographer
- Ingmar Bergman – Director
- Ray Evans – Music
- William Tuttle – Makeup
- Heath Ledger – Actor

== See also ==
- 14th Screen Actors Guild Awards
- 28th Golden Raspberry Awards
- 50th Grammy Awards
- 60th Primetime Emmy Awards
- 61st British Academy Film Awards
- 62nd Tony Awards
- 65th Golden Globe Awards
- List of submissions to the 80th Academy Awards for Best Foreign Language Film

== Bibliography ==
- Terrance, Vincent (2013). Television Specials: 5,336 Entertainment Programs, 1936–2012 (5 ed.). Jefferson, North Carolina, United States: Ballantine Books, McFarland & Company. ISBN 978-1-4766-1240-9. OCLC 844373010.
