= Tevin Thomas =

American musician

Tevin Thomas is a U.S. musician, composer, keyboard artist, producer and educator.

He graduated with an Educational Technology Masters Degree from the New York Institute of Technology, he has been teaching music at PS.811x Bronx, New York, where he performs with autistic students.

Tevin was born in Kansas City, Missouri and also grew up in Tulsa, Oklahoma. Thanks to his music teacher Richard Wilson, he had his first gig at the age 14, playing sax and keyboards in a jazz band at the Tulsa YMCA with Robert and Charlie Wilson, Ken Collier and Troy Hanson. Since then, he has performed all over the US and abroad working with 802, Aisha Wonder, Ashford & Simpson, Babyface, Bloodstone, Bobbi Humphrey, Craig Harris, Dionne Warwick, Gary Bartz, Gary Byrd, Impact Repertory Theatre, Jay-Z, Jeff Redd, Mary J. Blige, Nile Rodgers, Reverend Run and Roberta Flack. He is one of the very few pianists having performed with the godfather of avant-garde jazz Ornette Coleman.

Thomas co-wrote the song "Raise It Up" with Jamal Joseph, Charles Mack and IMPACT Repertory Theatre, who performed in the 2007 film August Rush. "Raise It Up" was nominated in 2008 Oscars in the Best Original Song category. Tevin performed with Impact and Jamia Simone Nash at the 80th Academy Awards. In 2009 the August Rush soundtrack was nominated for Grammy Award.

Tevin moved to Strasbourg, France in 2014. Tevin toured with The Sun Ra Arkestra from 2018 to 2022.
