= Love Power (Disenchanted song) =

"Love Power (End Credit Version)"

Single by Idina Menzel

from the album Disenchanted
- Released: November 17, 2022
- Genre: Pop
- Length: 2:57
- Label: Walt Disney
- Composer: Alan Menken
- Lyricist: Stephen Schwartz
- Producers: Lindgren; Ryan Tedder

Idina Menzel singles chronology
"The Loud Mouse Song" (2022)	"Love Power (End Credit Version)" (2022)	"Move" (2023)

Lyric video
- "Love Power (End Credit Version)" on YouTube

"Love Power" is a song written by composer Alan Menken and lyricist Stephen Schwartz for Disney's musical fantasy film Disenchanted (2022), the sequel to the 2007 film Enchanted. The song is performed by American actress and singer Idina Menzel, who plays Nancy Tremaine in both films. It is a Broadway-inspired power ballad, with lyrics advocating for the strength that love and memories have to overcome challenges. Menzel also recorded a pop version of the song, entitled "Love Power (End Credit Version)", for the film's closing credits, which Walt Disney Records released as its soundtrack's lead single in November 2022.

Despite her musical experience, Menzel does not sing in Enchanted due to the non-musical nature of her character, which Disney had hoped to correct in the sequel. Menken composed "Love Power" with references to Menzel's signature songs – "Let It Go" from Frozen (2013) and "Defying Gravity" from Wicked (2003) – in mind, and included allusions to the latter at the behest of Schwartz, its songwriter. Due to the COVID-19 pandemic, the singer recorded it in her home during lockdown, and most of her demo's vocals were retained for the final version. In the sequel, Nancy – now the Queen of Andalasia – encourages Morgan to use cherished memories of her stepmother, Giselle, to undo a curse that has turned her wicked.

Most of the song takes place during an animated sequence set in the fictional kingdom of Andalasia. Actress Amy Adams, who plays Giselle, briefly reprises the song a cappella during the film's climax. "Love Power" received mixed reviews from critics upon release, most of whom praised Menzel's performance but found the song unmemorable. Many reviewers also compared it to Menzel's previous work from Wicked and Disney's own Frozen franchise.

== Background and release ==
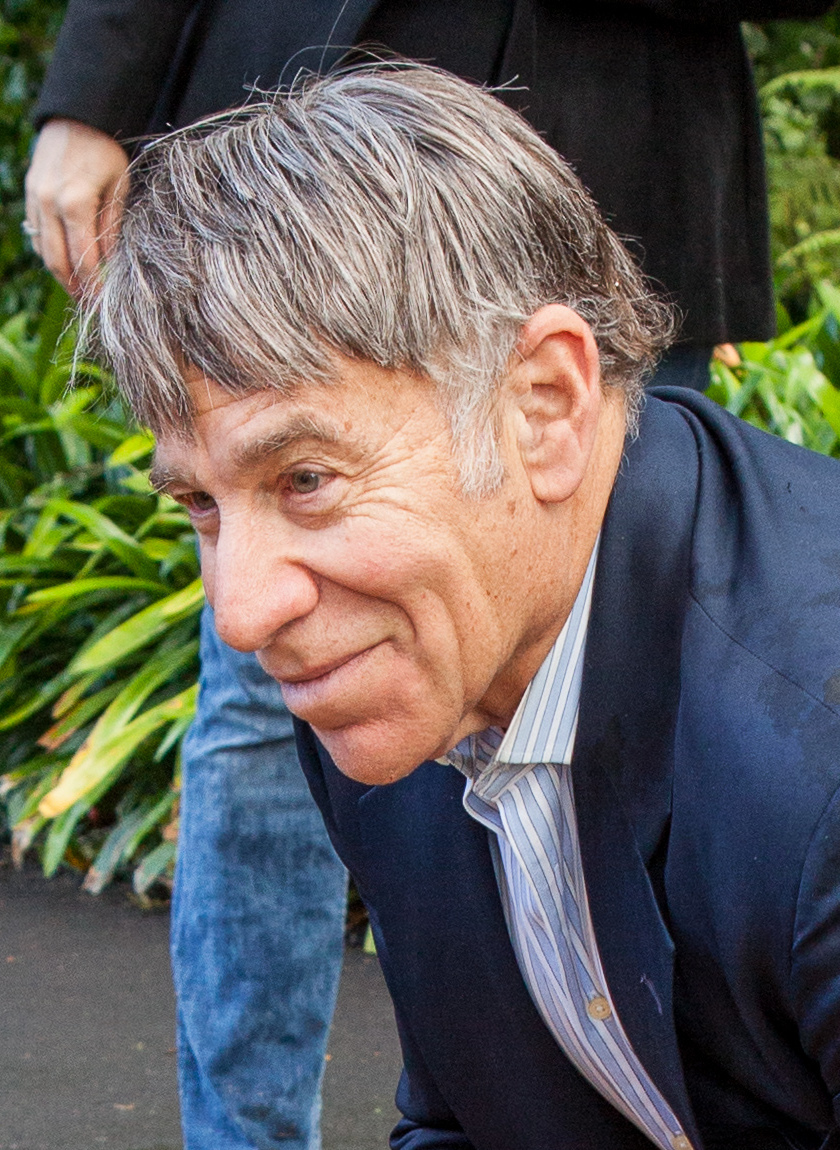
"Love Power" references "Defying Gravity", a song lyricist Stephen Schwartz had written for the stage musical Wicked (2003).

American actress and singer Idina Menzel first played Nancy Tremaine, Robert's (Patrick Dempsey) fiancé, in Disney's musical fantasy film Enchanted in 2007. Despite her extensive Broadway and singing careers, Menzel does not sing in the film, by which some critics and fans were disappointed. Composer Alan Menken and lyricist Stephen Schwartz, the latter of whom had previously worked with Menzel on the Broadway musical Wicked (2003), had written at least two songs intended for Nancy to sing in Enchanted, including a duet with Prince Edward (James Marsden) called "Enchanted". Both songs were ultimately omitted from the final film because the creative team found them superfluous. At the time, Menzel explained that it would have made little sense for her character, a non-musical New York native, to sing in Enchanted, but expressed interest in singing in a potential sequel as early as 2007.

Actress Amy Adams, who plays Giselle and also co-produced the sequel, described Menzel's lack of musical performances in Enchanted as the film's "grossest oversight", which they hoped to correct. Shortly after Disenchanted was announced, Menzel confirmed that she would finally have her own song written by Menken and Schwartz called "Love Power", which she predicted fans would appreciate. Although Menken stated he rarely writes music intended for a specific artist or voice, he had "Let It Go" from Frozen (2013) and "Defying Gravity" from Wicked – both songs performed by Menzel – in mind when composing "Love Power". Menken incorporated references to "Defying Gravity" at the behest of its songwriter, Schwartz. Lisa Laman of Collider theorized that, following the global success of Disney's Frozen in 2013, "there was no way Menzel would get left on the musical sidelines like she was in Enchanted".

"Love Power" is one of two songs Menzel recorded for Disenchanted, the other being a duet with Marsden's character, Edward. Due to the COVID-19 pandemic lockdowns, Menzel recorded the song in the closet of her own home while communicating with producers via Zoom. Most of her vocals from the original demo were retained for the final version. Menzel found "Love Power" to be vocally demanding, describing it as a song she could potentially struggle to perform live. She also recorded a pop version of the song, which plays during the film's closing credits. It was digitally released by Walt Disney Records as the soundtrack's lead single on November 17, 2022.

The single was produced by Lindgren and Ryan Tedder, and mixed by Curtis Douglas. Blake Taylor of Looper reported that the single harkens back to Disney's tradition of commissioning pop singers to record radio-friendly covers of their film's theme songs, such as Celine Dion and Michael Bolton for Beauty and the Beast (1991) and Hercules (1997), respectively, as well as Menzel's own songs from the Frozen franchise. In November 2022, Disney released a trailer for the film, which features Menzel singing "Love Power" interspersed with footage from the sequel. On January 6, 2023, a remix and extended version by Dave Audé was released digitally by Walt Disney Records.

== Use in Disenchanted ==
"Love Power" is used as the film's theme song. When Giselle's wish for a "fairy tale life" inadvertently turns her into a wicked stepmother, she sends her stepdaughter Morgan (Gabriella Baldacchino) to the animated kingdom of Andalasia to seek help reversing the spell. Upon reuniting with family friend Nancy, now Andalasia's queen, the character encourages Morgan to harness her most cherished memories of Giselle to restore her stepmother's true nature. Eventually, Nancy and Morgan return to the "real world" to help save Giselle from her own curse. Within the context of the film, "Love Power" serves as Disenchanted's 11th-hour song, described by Taylor as "the big rally cry that elevates the hero's lowest point into the trajectory of their triumph". It is also the emotional climax of Morgan's character arc. According to Disenchanted producer Barry Josephson, "Love Power" provides an opportunity to develop Morgan as a character while strengthening her relationship with Giselle.

Adams reprises the song during the film's "emotional climax" as she and Morgan reconcile towards its ending. With Morgan kneeling by her side, Giselle sings an abridged version of the song a cappella as she seemingly perishes. Ultimately, Giselle is revived by Morgan's undying love for her. Taylor found the sequence reminiscent of similar scenes from previous Disney films in which a main character or love interest seemingly dies, such as the Beast in Beauty and the Beast and Flynn Rider in Tangled (2010), although Disenchanted's central relationship is familial rather than romantic.

"Love Power" was the first scene Menzel shot for the film, for which she lip synced to the vocals she had recorded in her closet. She found the experience poignant for both herself and the crew after having been isolated without human interaction due to lockdown measures. The scene contains references to several other Disney projects; Morgan's tattered dress is magically transformed into a blue ballgown, a deliberate reference to the transformation sequence from Disney's Cinderella (1950). Micaela Pérez Vitale, a writer for MovieWeb, noticed that the restoration powers of love and memories are also integral to the plot of Frozen II (2019), which also starred Menzel.

== Music and lyrics ==
Written by Menken and Schwartz, "Love Power" is a power ballad. According to Kayla Laguerre-Lewis of Screen Rant, it is reminiscent of Broadway musicals, such as Schwartz and Menzel's work on Wicked. According to the song's official sheet music from Walt Disney Music Publishing, "Love Power" is performed in the key of C major, at a slow tempo of 96 beats per minute. Menzel's vocal range on the song spans exactly two octaves, from F3–F5. The singer belts throughout the track, particularly during its chorus, with Taylor describing her final sustained note as "nearly guaranteed to be the longest you'll hear in any tune this year". Featuring a repetitive refrain, the song's title is a double entendre about "those who love power and those who understand and can use the power of love". The phrase "love power" is repeated throughout, and its lyrics reassure listeners about "the power of love and memories of loved ones". According to Shrishty of Collider, the line "Just remember the memories that show us the power of love" ultimately serves as the key to undoing the enchantment that has turned Giselle evil. The song also features an orchestral chord progression that serves as an Easter egg to the Beauty and the Beast score, which was also composed by Menken.

Menzel described "Love Power" as a soaring, romantic anthem. She sings about how the love and memories people create with each other are truly among the most powerful forces. The singer described "Love Power" as a "reminder of everything that matters most", such as moments and memories. "It is about understanding that life is not perfect, but when we go through struggles and traverse roads together, that's true love." Lyrically and musically, the song references several earlier Disney ballads, including Menzel's own "Let it Go" from Frozen with its line "Let it grow/let it glow". According to Digital Spy contributor Ian Sandwell, the ballad combines "Let it Go" with Wicked's "Defying Gravity". Benjamin Lee of The Guardian summarized the song as "a brassy attempt to get a returning Idina Menzel to deliver a Frozen-esque number about the power of love". While the film version spans 4:15 in duration, the remixed single lasts a shorter 2:57.

== Reception ==
"Love Power" was met with mixed reviews from critics, most of whom praised Menzel's vocals. According to Ross Bonaime of Collider, Menzel predictably received the film's best song due to her post-Frozen popularity. Writing for TheWrap, Elizabeth Weitzman said Menzel "knocks [the song] out of the park" vocally, while Ella Kemp of Little White Lies called the track worthy of her career and talent. For RogerEbert.com, Marya E. Gates described Menzel's voice as "powerful and spine-tinglingly beautiful as ever", despite the song's generic title. The Indian Express contributor Rohan Naahar said the performer "runs away with the show-stopping number", which he deemed an earworm. Caleb Johnson of the Northern Star called "Love Power" an uplifting highlight, appreciating it for correcting Disney's mistake of not using Menzel's singing voice in Enchanted. Similarly, Tori Brazier of Metro said the ballad corrects Disney's oversight by finally allowing Menzel to "do exactly what she does best".

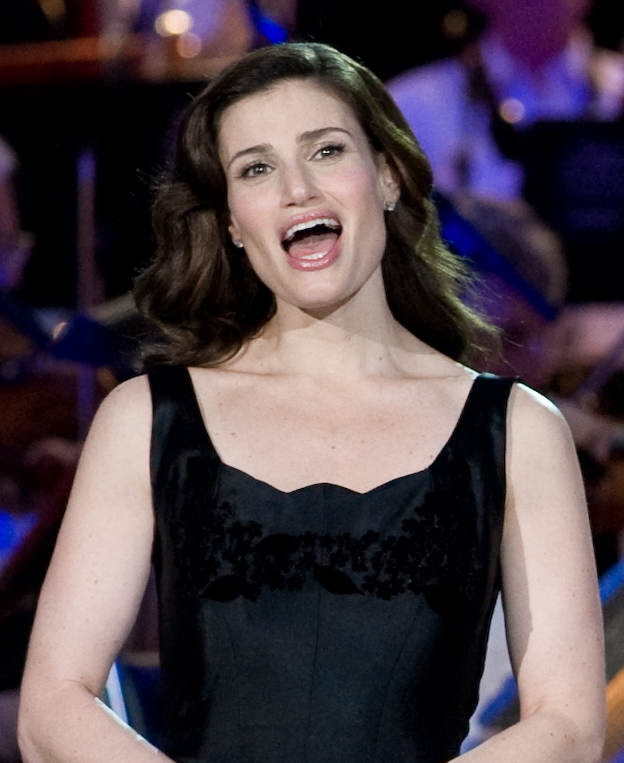
Critics praised Menzel's performance, comparing it to her work in Frozen and Wicked.

Several critics compared the song to Menzel's previous work for Disney, namely "Let it Go" from Frozen, as well as "Defying Gravity" from the stage musical Wicked. Other critics, such as Claudia Lin of The Rice Thresher, considered the song to be a stronger inclusion on a soundtrack they otherwise found unimpressive. Variety film critic Owen Gleiberman said "Love Power" confirms "we couldn’t be more in awe of her pipes and couldn’t be less invested in the goofy scattershot story". The Hollywood Reporter's Lovia Gyarkye said the song "almost recreate[s] the magic of Enchanted".

Reviewers were less receptive towards the quality of the song itself. Liz Curtin of The Spectator called "Love Power" catchy, despite not being "a very good song" in their opinion, and appreciated hearing Menzel's voice. Although Kristy Puchko of Mashable thanked Disney for having Menzel sing, they found the song underwhelming and repetitive. Both Vanity Fair's chief film critic Richard Lawson and Theresa DeLucci of Den of Geek dismissed it as inferior to "Let it Go", while the staff of Moviefone said it fails to "move the needle" despite Menzel's impressive performance. Writing for Paste, Abby Olcese said "Love Power" lacks "actual meaning", despite a heartfelt performance from Menzel. Lee of The Guardian dismissed its lyrics as "so slapdash that one wonders if it was improvised". In a negative review, Polygon's Petrana Radulovic accused "Love Power" of wasting Menzel's talent, calling it "incredibly generic and corny". Radulovic also criticized the inferior animation quality, which "undermines what could be a moving moment" between Menzel and Baldacchino.

Ranking "Love Power" the film's second-best song, Laguerre-Lewis of Screen Rant praised Menzel's performance, calling it "the power ballad [fans] have been waiting for" with potential to become "a modern Disney classic." Despite ranking the film version as Disenchanted's third-best song, Taylor of Looper ranked the end-credits version as the film's worst, despite Menzel's "impressive" vocals. Laman of Collider ranked "Love Power" the seventh best song from Disenchanted, describing it as lyrically forgettable despite Menzel's performance and criticizing its reference to "Let it Go" as "eye-roll worthy".

== Charts ==
Weekly chart performance for "Love Power"
Chart (2022)	Peak position
UK Singles Downloads (OCC)	96

== Track listing ==
Digital download - Single

1. "Love Power" (End Credit Version) - 2:57

Digital Download - Remixes

1. "Love Power" (Davé Aude Remix) - 3:04
2. "Love Power" (Davé Aude Extended Mix) - 3:50

== Credits and personnel ==
Credits for "Love Power (End Credit Version)" adapted from AllMusic:

- Reuben Cohen – mastering engineer
- Curtis Douglas – mixing
- Melanie Fontana – vocals (background)
- Lindgren – producer
- Gavin Lurssen – mastering engineer
- Alan Menken – composer
- Idina Menzel – primary artist
- Ryan Tedder – producer

== Release history ==
Release dates and formats for "Love Power"
Region	Date	Format(s)	Version	Label(s)	Ref.
United States	November 17, 2022	Digital download; Streaming	End Credit Version	Walt Disney	
United States	January 6, 2023	Digital download; Streaming	Davé Aude Remixes	Walt Disney	
