= True Love's Kiss (song) =

2007 song by Alan Menken and Stephen Schwartz

Song by Amy Adams and James Marsden

from the album Enchanted
- Released: November 20, 2007
- Recorded: 2007
- Genre: Pop
- Length: 3:13
- Label: Walt Disney
- Composer: Alan Menken
- Lyricist: Stephen Schwartz
- Producers: Alan Menken; Stephen Schwartz; Robbie Buchanan

"True Love's Kiss" is a song from the Disney film Enchanted (2007), written and composed by Stephen Schwartz and Alan Menken, and performed by Amy Adams and James Marsden.

== Production ==
"True Love's Kiss" is written as an homage to, and parody of, the "I Want" songs of early Disney princess films from the 1930s–1950s. Menken deemed it "the pivotal assignment ... because there were so many preconceptions with that number". It was a challenge to make it a satisfactory spoof of the songs from princess films, and it was hard to create a piece of music that satisfied Lima, Schwartz, and him. In creating this "Walt era reference", the songwriting duo thought about how the early princess movies were "musicalized"; Schwartz "tried to channel the classic Walt Disney sensibility and then just push it a little bit further in terms of choices of words or certain lyrics". The songwriters and director Kevin Lima originally struggled with how to create the "classic Walt" sound required for the send-up of Cinderella-era music – each person had a differing vision, and the music genre could not be settled on. Eventually, Lima was flown to Menken's New York studio where they worked on the song until the final piece of music was chosen.

The eight-minute animated sequence sees the innocent girl Giselle sing about her desire for true love's kiss; a prayer that is answered by Prince Edward. The tune is "reminiscent of "I'm Wishing/One Song" and "Someday My Prince Will Come". The song is intended to be a parody of the trope of the three oldest Disney princess movies: Snow White, Cinderella and Sleeping Beauty, where the two protagonists meet, sing a song, then get married the following day.

At the very end of Carrie Underwood's "Ever Ever After" (the song sung during the credits), a line from the song is sampled.

== Context ==
The song takes place during the animated portion at the very beginning of the film, where Giselle and Edward sing separately about love, bump into each other (after she is attacked by a troll), then sing about love together.

The point of the song is to show that for both characters "the goal of True Love’s Kiss [is] a bit more important than actually being with a person they love."

== Critical reception ==
The Telegraph deemed it "pure parody – a sly dig at Disney's musty conventions", and added that the "wistful" number "belongs in a 19th-century operetta". Catholic News called it "an intentionally gooey duet", while SplashMagazine thought the song would earn a Best Original Song nomination at the Oscars. FilmTracks liked Amy Adam's performance, but disliked the song's lack of memorability. MovieMusicUK described the "opening ditty" as "a sweeping prototypical Disney affair", and JewishJournal deemed it a "sweet opening".
