= Paul Castro =

American screenwriter and educator

Paul Castro is an American screenwriter and educator. He is best known for the musical fantasy, August Rush.

== Early life ==
Castro graduated #1 from UCLA's film school and before that attended military school during his high-school years. He later wrote a script about a nun he met in grade school named Sister Eileen. Castro was a world-class soccer player, earned a full soccer scholarship to college and played in Brazil.

== Career ==
Castro received his master of fine arts from the UCLA School of Theater, Film, and Television in 2000, where he graduated first in his class. While pursuing his degree, Castro was a finalist for the Coca-Cola Refreshing Filmmaker's Award for directing and producing his original screenplay Healing, and landed a three-picture screenwriting deal worth $1 million. After graduating from UCLA, Castro became a professional screenwriter in Los Angeles. His movies have starred Robin Williams, John Travolta, and other A-List movie stars.

=== August Rush ===
Castro won and accepted a Movie Guide for being the creator and original writer of August Rush. The romantic musical drama, with music by Mark Mancina, was released November 21, 2007, by Warner Bros. The film is directed by Oscar-nominee Kirsten Sheridan, and stars Freddie Highmore, Keri Russell, Jonathan Rhys Meyers, Terrence Howard and Robin Williams.

August Rush grossed $65.3 million, and received mixed to negative reviews from film critics. In a review by USA Today, Claudia Puig commented, "August Rush will not be for everyone, but it works if you surrender to its lilting and unabashedly sentimental tale of evocative music and visual poetry." The Hollywood Reporter reviewed the film positively, writing "the story is about musicians and how music connects people, so the movie's score and songs, created by composers Mark Mancina and Hans Zimmer, give poetic whimsy to an implausible tale."

Castro signed a deal with Warner Bros. to bring August Rush to Broadway as a stage musical. August Rush premiered on May 3, 2019, at the Paramount Theatre in Aurora, Illinois. The book was written by Glen Berger, the music was composed by Mark Mancina, and the lyrics were written by both Berger and Mancina. The play was directed by John Doyle.

== Teaching ==
Following his Hollywood successes, Castro taught screenwriting at UCLA, and created the online course The Million Dollar Screenplay.

Castro created the online screenwriting course, INSPIRATIONAL SCREENWRITING, on udemy. INSPIRATIONAL SCREENWRITING and his other course THE BUSINESS OF SCREENWRITING has over 12,000 students in 137 different countries.

Castro was a tenured associate professor at Elon University.

== Personal life ==
For seven years in Los Angeles, Castro volunteered as a suicide prevention counselor. He holds black belts in Tang Soo Do and Jiu-Jitsu.

=== Military service ===
Castro left Hollywood after 9-11 and was commissioned as a Navy officer, where he graduated from officer candidate school. He was then ordered to Naval Special Warfare Command and became the PAO of the Navy SEAL Teams. There, he participated in the center's Superfrog Triathlon. The Navy SEALs awarded Paul Castro "Honorary Frogman" honors. After his service, Castro returned to Hollywood.

== Filmography ==
Year	Title	Role	Notes
2007	August Rush	Story by	With Nick Castle and James V. Hart
2009	Dixon's Girl	Story by	Short film
2018	Speed Kills		With David Aaron Cohen and John Luessenhop
2018	Wedding of Dreams	Written by	TV movie, with Nicole Baxter
