= Enchanted (soundtrack) =

2007 soundtrack album by Alan Menken and Stephen Schwartz

Enchanted: An Original Walt Disney Records Soundtrack

Soundtrack album by Alan Menken and Stephen Schwartz
- Released: November 20, 2007
- Recorded: 2007; Hollywood Studio Symphony
- Studios: Todd AO Scoring Stage, Right Track Studios
- Genre: Show tunes
- Length: 54:27
- Label: Walt Disney
- Producers: Alan Menken; Stephen Schwartz; Mark Bright; Blake Neely

Enchanted: An Original Walt Disney Records Soundtrack is the soundtrack to the 2007 Disney film of the same name. Released on November 20, 2007, by Walt Disney Records, it contains 15 audio tracks, including five original songs used in the film, all of which were composed by Alan Menken and Stephen Schwartz. The film's score, composed by Menken, is also included on the soundtrack. Orchestrated by Kevin Kliesch, Danny Troob, and Blake Neely, the score and songs were conducted by Menken's longtime collaborator Michael Kosarin, and performed by the Hollywood Studio Symphony. Although Menken and Schwartz's "Ever Ever After", performed by country singer-songwriter Carrie Underwood, was not released as a single, a music video of the song was made and is included on the CD.

== Track listing ==
All songs are composed by Alan Menken with lyrics by Stephen Schwartz except track 15 written by Jack Brooks and Harry Warren. All scores composed and produced by Menken. All songs produced by Menken and Schwartz except track 5 produced by Mark Bright and track 15 produced by Blake Neely

No.	Title	Recording artist(s)	Length
1.	"True Love's Kiss"	Amy Adams and James Marsden	3:13
2.	"Happy Working Song"	Amy Adams	2:11
3.	"That's How You Know"	Amy Adams and Marlon Saunders	3:49
4.	"So Close"	Jon McLaughlin	3:49
5.	"Ever Ever After" (Record Version)	Carrie Underwood	3:31
6.	"Andalasia" (Score)	Alan Menken	1:47
7.	"Into the Well" (Score)	Alan Menken	4:42
8.	"Robert Says Goodbye" (Score)	Alan Menken	3:16
9.	"Nathaniel and Pip" (Score)	Alan Menken	4:03
10.	"Prince Edward's Search" (Score)	Alan Menken	2:24
11.	"Girls Go Shopping" (Score)	Alan Menken	1:41
12.	"Narissa Arrives" (Score)	Alan Menken	1:34
13.	"Storybook Ending" (Score)	Alan Menken	10:44
14.	"Enchanted Suite" (Score)	Alan Menken	4:36
15.	"That's Amore"	James Marsden	3:05
Total length:			54:27

== Charts ==
=== Weekly charts ===
Chart (2007–08)	Peak position
US Billboard 200	39
US Soundtrack Albums (Billboard)	5

=== Year-end charts ===
Chart (2008)	Position
US Billboard 200	135
US Soundtrack Albums (Billboard)	13

== Certifications ==
Region	Certification	Certified units/sales
United States (RIAA)	Gold	500,000^{‡}
^{‡} Sales+streaming figures based on certification alone.
