= Falling Slowly =

Single by Glen Hansard and Markéta Irglová

from the album Once soundtrack
- Released: 21 April 2006 (The Swell Season); 4 September 2006 (Beauty in Trouble soundtrack); 22 September 2006 (The Cost); 22 May 2007 (Once soundtrack); February 2008 (radio single)
- Genre: Indie folk; indie rock
- Length: 4:50 (album Version); 4:04 (soundtrack version); 4:35 (The Frames version)
- Label: Overcoat
- Songwriters: Glen Hansard; Markéta Irglová
- Producer: Glen Hansard

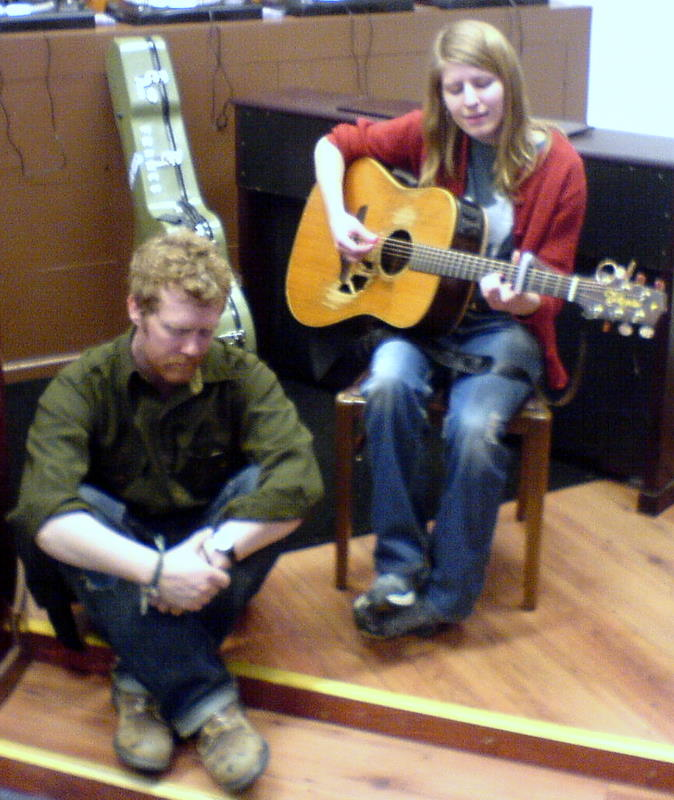
Glen Hansard and Markéta Irglová during a show in Derry, Northern Ireland in April 2006.

"Falling Slowly" is an indie folk/indie rock song written, composed and performed by Glen Hansard and Markéta Irglová. It was featured on the soundtrack of the 2007 Irish musical romance film Once, which starred Hansard and Irglová, and for which it won the Academy Award for Best Original Song at the 80th Academy Awards. The song was also recorded by Hansard's band The Frames.

== History ==
The song was written and composed while Once was in production. The film's director and screenwriter, John Carney, developed the script around songs which Hansard and Irglová had provided to him. In the movie, the duo play the song in the Waltons Music shop across from the George's Street Arcade in Dublin, with Hansard on guitar and Irglová on piano. The couple performed it at gigs in various European venues over the next two years. Versions appeared in 2006 on two albums: The Cost, which Hansard's band The Frames recorded and released, and The Swell Season, an album on which Hansard and Irglová collaborated.

According to the "First Showing" article:

After almost getting her acceptance speech skipped and almost not getting to say a word for her acceptance at the 2008 ceremony after their Oscar win, Irglova made a speech about the song in which at the end of the speech she says, "This song was written from a perspective of hope, and hope at the end of the day connects us all, no matter how different we are..."

== Charts ==
The song charted at #16 in the Irish Singles Chart when The Frames first released it. The Glen Hansard and Markéta Irglová version charted at #28 in December 2007, before peaking at #2 in March 2008, following the song's Oscar win. It sold 944,000 digital downloads in the United States.

Chart (2008)	Peak position
Irish Singles Chart	2
Canadian Hot 100	8
US Billboard Hot 100	61

== Awards ==
"Falling Slowly" was nominated for a 2008 Grammy, for Best Song Written For Motion Picture, Television Or Other Visual Media; it lost to "Love You I Do" from Dreamgirls.

The song won the Academy Award for Best Original Song on 24 February 2008, beating out the choral gospel song "Raise It Up" from August Rush and three songs from the Disney musical Enchanted. The win marked the fourth consecutive year that the Oscar-winning song was not nominated for the Golden Globe Award for Best Original Song.

The song's Oscar eligibility had been disputed because it was performed and recorded prior to the release of Once and it was even the title song of the movie Beauty in Trouble released in 2006. The Academy of Motion Picture Arts and Sciences ruled, however, that because the song had been written and composed for the movie, and because any public exposure during the long movie development had been minimal, it remained eligible. (Note: The Academy had ruled consistently on a similar dispute involving 2005 Best Original Song nominee "In the Deep.")

== Cover versions ==
"Falling Slowly" appears on the original cast album of the stage adaptation of Once, performed by Steve Kazee and Cristin Milioti; this album won the Grammy Award for Best Musical Theater Album.

It has been covered by synthpop group Joy Electric on their 2009 covers album, Favorites at Play.

In Season 1 of "The Voice" duo Elenowen sang Falling Slowly for their Blind Audition

In season 8 of American Idol, Kris Allen covered the song during a night titled "Songs from the Cinema".

Derek Webb recorded a cover of the song on his democratically selected cover album Democracy, Vol. 2.

The song also has been covered by the operatic pop group Il Divo on their album Wicked Game as a Spanish rendition, as “Falling Slowly (Te Prometo)”.

It is covered it on Celtic Thunder's Voyage album in 2012.

Josh Groban covered it on his 2013 album All That Echoes, and sang with Idina Menzel in 2018.

Louise Dearman and Shayne Ward released a version on 17 February 2014.

Australians Kate Ceberano and David Campbell released a version on 17 December 2014.

English boy band Collabro covered the song on the special edition of their Stars album on 15 August 2014.

Welsh singer John Owen-Jones featured the song on his most recent album, Rise, released in March 2015.

In April 2015, as a one-time promotional event for the Toronto stage production of Once, Mirvish Productions invited local guitarists to perform the song with the cast. Producers predicted about a hundred participants; ultimately 926 guitarists performed in the event.

The song was covered by husband and wife duo, actors Nathan West (who performs under the name East of Eli) and Chyler Leigh, who released the song, under the name "Westleigh", to their production studio, Modern Machine's SoundCloud.

It has also been covered by member of K-pop group Exo, Park Chanyeol, on his Instagram account a couple of times.

In season 13 of The Voice, the song is covered by Addison Agen and Adam Levine.

During The Yogscast 2017 Christmas charity live streams, husband and wife duo Alex and Briony Turner covered the song.

The song is covered in Season 2, Episode 6 of Good Trouble, "Twenty-Fine", by cast members Emma Hunton and Josh Pence.

Jung Yonghwa from CNBLUE covered the song several times, on the reality show We Got Married with his virtual wife Seohyun from SNSD, the KBS2 variety show Win Win, MBC Radio Star, SBS Strong Heart, KBS Star Golden Bell, the Beautiful Morning with KCW Radio program, and on CNBLUE's One More Time arena tour in Hiroshima in 2013. Yonghwa stated that it is one of his favorite songs. Lea Michele and Darren Criss played the song multiple times as part of their setlist on their LMDC tour in 2018.

The song was covered as a duet by Minnesota artists Joe Vitullo and Adrianne Prettyman on the album "Got It Covered" released in 2022.

== Critical reception ==
Response to "Falling Slowly" was generally positive. Glen Hansard's and Marketa Irglova's performances of "Falling Slowly" on screen and on stage led to Bob Dylan asking them to be his opening act on his World Tour.

== In popular culture ==
Adam Levine and Addison Agen, the 2017 finalist on the thirteenth season of the U.S. The Voice performed the song as a duet in the 2017 Top 4 finalist stage of the performances.

The song was featured prominently on the Fox show, Last Man on Earth sung by Jason Sudeikis and Will Forte.

The song was featured on Power Ballad, as the main character Rick Power wanders Dublin streets and walks past a busker that sings it, in a clear reference to the film Once.
