= Jazzhole =

American musical group

- Origin: New York City, U.S.
- Genres: Acid jazz, hip-hop, electronica, R&B, nu jazz, soul
- Years active: 1994–present
- Labels: Beave Music, Mesa/Bluemoon, Atlantic
- Members: Marlon Saunders; Warren Rosenstein; John Pondel; Lord KCB; David Inniss; Mark Robohm; Rosa Russ; Michelle Lewis
- Past members: Ahmed Best; Ronnie Russ; Kevin DiSimone; Jack Ruby Jr. Peter Mark
- Website: jazzhole.com

Jazzhole is an American acid jazz, soul, and hip-hop collective formed in New York City in 1994. Originally founded by vocalist Marlon Saunders and keyboardist/producer Warren Rosenstein, the group quickly established a permanent core songwriting and production trio with the addition of guitarist John Pondel. The band combines acid jazz, hip-hop, electronica, and R&B, with later albums incorporating acoustic soul and downtempo bossa nova elements.

While Jazzhole operates as an evolving collective of live and studio musicians, several contributors have been central to their recordings over the decades. Actor and musician Ahmed Best provided co-writing, co-production, vocals, and percussion across the band's first three albums. Other prominent recurring members include rapper Lord KCB (formerly of Us3), bassist David Inniss, drummer Mark Robohm, and vocalists Rosa Russ, Michelle Lewis, and Kaïssa.

The band's name is an allusion to the "Jazz Hole" club from The Simpsons.

== Band members ==
Core members

- Marlon Saunders – lead vocals, vocal arrangements
- Warren Rosenstein – keyboards, production, engineering
- John Pondel – guitar, composing

Recurring members and collaborators

- Lord KCB – vocals, rap
- David Inniss – bass
- Mark Robohm – drums
- Rosa Russ – vocals
- Michelle Lewis – vocals
- Kaïssa – vocals

Former members and early contributors

- Ahmed Best – co-writing, co-production, vocals, percussion
- Ronnie Russ – vocals
- Kevin DiSimone – keyboards, vocals, trumpet
- Jack Ruby Jr. – vocals
- Peter Mark – percussion

== Discography ==
- The Jazzhole (Mesa/Bluemoon, 1994)
- …And the Feeling Goes Round (Mesa/Bluemoon, 1995)
- The Beat Is the Bomb! (Mesa/Bluemoon, 1996)
- Blackburst (Beave Music, 2000)
- Circle of the Sun (Beave Music, 2003)
- Poet's Walk (Beave Music, 2006)
- Blue 72 (Beave Music, 2014)
- Moonlight Mile (Beave Music, 2025)
