= Speed Kills =

2018 crime film by Jodi Scurfield

- Theatrical release poster
- Directed by: Jodi Scurfield
- Screenplay by: David Aaron Cohen; John Luessenhop
- Story by: Paul Castro; David Aaron Cohen; John Luessenhop
- Based on: Speed Kills by Arthur J. Harris
- Produced by: Oscar Generale; Richard Rionda Del Castro
- Starring: John Travolta
- Cinematography: Andrzej Sekula
- Edited by: Randy Bricker
- Music by: Geronimo Mercado
- Production company: Saban Films
- Distributed by: Lionsgate
- Release dates: August 16, 2018 (Netherlands); November 16, 2018 (limited)
- Running time: 102 minutes
- Country: United States
- Languages: English; Spanish
- Budget: $15 million
- Box office: $5,812

Speed Kills is a 2018 American crime drama film directed by Jodi Scurfield and starring John Travolta. It is based on Arthur J. Harris's book of the same name about the life of Donald Aronow, fictionalized as "Ben Aronoff."

== Plot ==
Speedboat racing champion and multimillionaire Ben Aronoff leads a double life that lands him in trouble with the law and drug lords.

== Cast ==
- John Travolta as Ben Aronoff
- Katheryn Winnick as Emily Gowen
- Jennifer Esposito as Katherine Aronoff
- Michael Weston as Shelly Katz
- Jordi Mollà as Jules Bergman
- Amaury Nolasco as Agent Lopez
- Matthew Modine as George H. W. Bush
- James Remar as Meyer Lansky
- Kellan Lutz as Robbie Reemer
- Charlie Gillespie as Andrew Aronoff
- Moran Atias as Contessa
- Tom Sizemore as Dwayne Franklin
- Mike Massa as "Knocky" House
- Luis Da Silva as "Panama"
- Keith Hudson as "Dutch" Kramer

== Reception ==
The film has a 0% approval rating on Rotten Tomatoes based on 17 reviews, with an average rating of 2.5/10. Barbara Shulgasser-Parker of Common Sense Media awarded it one star out of five. Simon Abrams of RogerEbert.com awarded it half a star. Powerboat Racing World website told their readers to 'prepare for disappointment'.
