= The Swell Season (album) =

2006 studio album by the Swell Season

Studio album by The Swell Season
- Released: 21 April 2006
- Recorded: Sono, Prague, December 2005
- Genre: Folk
- Label: Overcoat

The Swell Season chronology
The Swell Season (2006)	Strict Joy (2009)

Professional ratings
Review scores
Source	Rating
AllMusic	3.5/5 stars
Sputnikmusic	5/5 stars
RTÉ	4/5 stars

The Swell Season is the self-titled, debut album by the Swell Season, (Glen Hansard and Markéta Irglová), released in 2006. The song "Falling Slowly" went on to be nominated for a Grammy and won the Academy Award for Best Original Song in 2008.

== Track listing ==
1. "This Low" (Glen Hansard)
2. "Sleeping" (Hansard)
3. "Falling Slowly" (Hansard, Markéta Irglová)
4. "Drown Out" (Hansard, Irglová (chorus only))
5. "Lies" (Hansard, Irglová)
6. "When Your Mind's Made Up" (Hansard)
7. "The Swell Season" (Irglová)
8. "Leave" (Hansard)
9. "The Moon" (Hansard, Irglová (chorus only))
10. "Alone Apart" (Irglová, Hansard (guitar only))

== Personnel ==
- Glen Hansard – guitar, vocals
- Markéta Irglová – piano, vocals
- Marja Tuhkanen – violin, viola
- Bertrand Galen – cello
