= Jamia Simone Nash =

American singer and actress

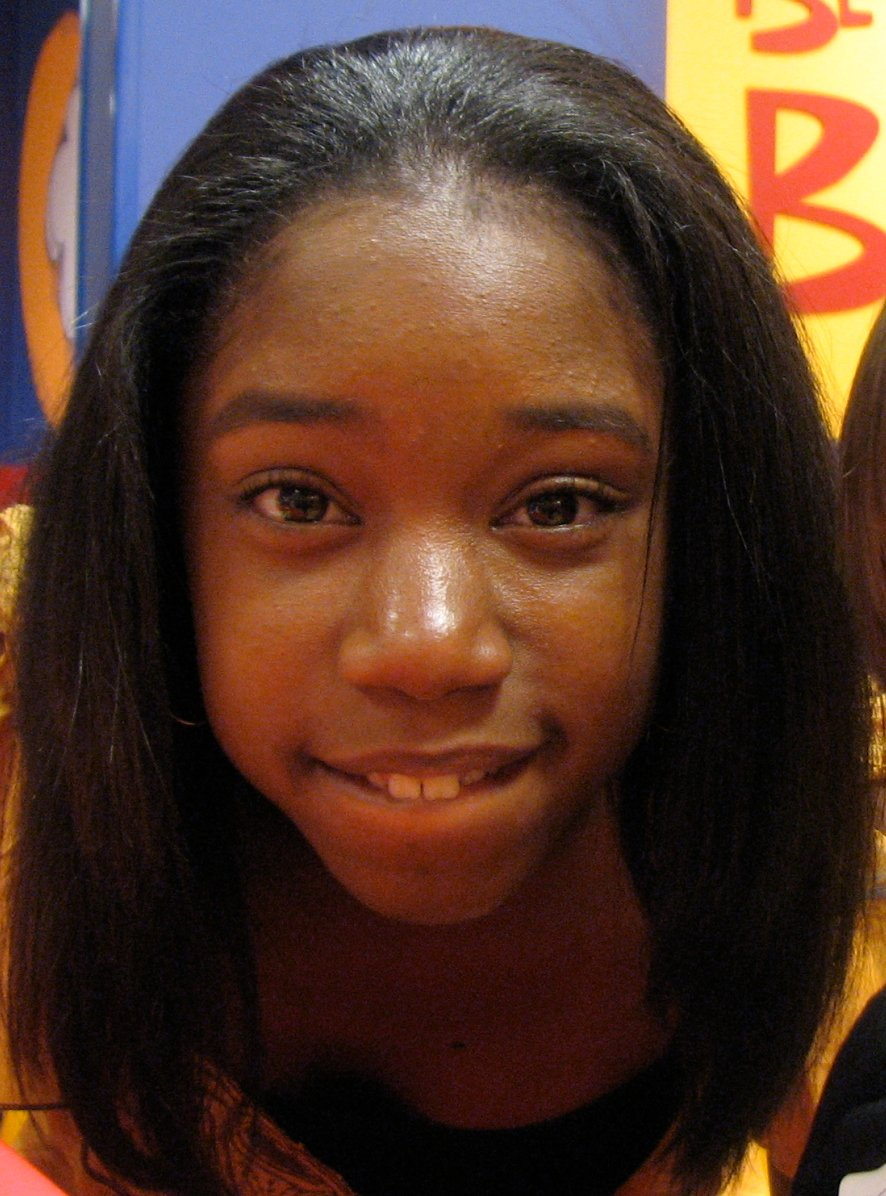
- Nash in 2009
- Other name: Jamia
- Occupations: Actress, singer
- Years active: 2000–present
- Website: instagram.com/thisisjamia

Jamia Simone Nash, also known simply as Jamia, is an American singer and actress.

== Career ==
Nash's first national appearance was in Love & Basketball in 2000 in which she played Quincy and Monica’s baby. Her first major performance was at 6, when she won a singing competition hosted by McDonald's. She performed at Showtime at the Apollo in 2002, where she sang the Alicia Keys song "Fallin'". She performed at the 2003 Essence Awards, singing William "Smokey" Robinson's song "Who's Lovin' You" in honor of Mary J. Blige. She and her younger sister Olivia sing the hook in the song "Black Girl Pain" on Talib Kweli's 2004 album The Beautiful Struggle.

She played a ten-year-old Fantasia Barrino in the 2006 Lifetime Original Movie Life Is Not a Fairytale: The Fantasia Barrino Story, a biographical film about the 2004 American Idol winner.

In the 2007 film August Rush, Nash's character "Hope" is the lead vocalist on the song "Raise It Up", which was nominated for the Academy Award for Best Original Song.

Nash performed "Raise It Up" from August Rush at the 2008 Academy Awards, making her the youngest ever to perform on an Academy Awards telecast. Also at the Academy Awards, she was shown on stage playing tennis via Wii Sports with the host Jon Stewart until he noticed the crowd behind her and she ran off stage. Her latest appearance was on July 18, 2009, in the Kennedy Center. She sang Celine Dion's song "Let's Talk About Love" as a tribute for the Apollo program's 40th anniversary.

Nash appeared on CBS' daytime television soap opera, The Young and the Restless as Ana Hamilton in 2008.

Billed as MC Lily, Nash sang and rapped about the alphabet on Nick Jr. Her song "Bongo Bird" (sung to the tune of "Bingo") was featured as a video on the Noggin series Jack's Big Music Show. She was the original singing voice of the character Uniqua on the first three seasons of The Backyardigans. She has also acted in episodes of 7th Heaven, Romeo!, My Wife and Kids, The Young and the Restless, and appeared as herself on The Tony Danza Show, Half & Half and Big Time. She also performed the United States national anthem at Citi Field.

Nash, credited as 'Jamia', is featured on the song "Haunted" from the Deluxe version of Fantasia Barrino's album Side Effects of You (2013).

On March 28, 2017, Nash independently released her debut EP, "Simply Jamia."

== Personal life ==
Nash is from Atlanta. Her parents are both gospel singers and musicians.

== Discography ==
- Simply Jamia EP (2017)

== Filmography ==
- Half & Half (2003) – Jamia
- 7th Heaven (2003) – Haley Michaels
- My Wife and Kids (2003) – Aretha
- Romeo! (2004) – Chantel
- The Backyardigans – Uniqua (singing voice from 2004 to 2009)
- Jack's Big Music Show (2005) – Herself (Episode: “The Bongo Bird”) (Short Film: The Bongo Song)
- Life Is Not a Fairytale: The Fantasia Barrino Story (2006) – Young Fantasia Barrino
- August Rush (2007) – Hope
- The Young and the Restless (2008–2012) – Ana Hamilton
