= Marlon Saunders =

American singer-songwriter

- Born: Marlon Derrick Saunders
- Origin: Chestertown, Maryland, U.S.
- Genres: Contemporary R&B; neo soul
- Occupations: Singer-songwriter; record producer; choir director; music educator
- Labels: Black Honey, Beave Music, Bluemoon
- Formerly of: Jazzhole
- Website: marlonsaunders.com

Marlon Derrick Saunders is an American singer, songwriter, and record producer. He is best known for his vocal performances on the Sega-published video games Sonic Adventure (1998) and Sonic Adventure 2 (2001), as well as Burning Rangers (1998), Phantasy Star Online (2000) and Nights Into Dreams (1996).

Saunders is also a vocal coach, choir director and music educator. He was a guest vocalist for the 2007 song "That's How You Know" — performed by Amy Adams from the accompanying soundtrack for Disney's Enchanted — which was nominated for Best Song Written for Motion Picture, Television or Other Visual Media at the 51st Annual Grammy Awards. Saunders has served as a faculty member for the Clive Davis Institute of Recorded Music at New York University, Berklee College of Music and the School of Jazz and Contemporary Music program at the New School.

== Career ==
In 1994, Saunders formed the acid-jazz group Jazzhole, which signed with Rhino Entertainment and released seven albums. Originally formed as a duo, it later grew into a band ensemble. In the late 1990s, Saunders worked with video game company Sega to provide vocal work for their video games. He remains best known for his performances on both versions of the theme song for Knuckles, "Unknown From M.E." in Sonic Adventure (1998) and Sonic Adventure 2 (2001). Saunders also performs on the soundtrack to the Burning Rangers (1998) game on one of the ending songs, "We are Burning Rangers", as well as the Christmas a cappella version of "Dreams Dreams", the theme from Nights into Dreams.

From 2015–2017, Saunders toured with Stevie Wonder on the Songs in the Key of Life Tour, as choir director. He has since served as vocal contractor for Sam Smith, Bastille, Logic, Mondo Cozmo and Andrea Bocelli. Marlon has worked with countless major artists such as The Lumineers, Michael Bublé, Sting, Cynthia Erivo, Michael Jackson, Billy Joel and Bobby McFerrin.

In 2019, he began working with the Afrobeats-soul band, Iqram & The Immigrant Groove.

== Discography ==
=== Solo albums ===
- Enter My Mind (2003)
- A Groove So Deep (2005)

=== Jazzhole albums ===
- The Jazzhole (February 22, 1994, Mesa/Blue Moon Recordings)
- …And the Feeling Goes Round (August 29, 1995, Mesa/Blue Moon Recordings)
- The Beat Is the Bomb! (Remixes) (June 18, 1996, Mesa/Blue Moon Recordings)
- Blackburst (February 29, 2000, Beave Music)
- Circle of the Sun (November 1, 2002, Beave Music)
- Poet's Walk (July 13, 2006, Beave Music)
