= Even Pigeons Go to Heaven =

Even Pigeons Go To Heaven
- Mr Moulin getting a sneak preview of "Heaven"
- Directed by: Samuel Tourneux
- Written by: Karine Binaux; Olivier Gilbert; Samuel Tourneux
- Produced by: BUF
- Music by: Regis Santaniello
- Release date: 2007
- Running time: 9 minutes
- Country: France
- Language: French

Even Pigeons Go To Heaven (French: Même les pigeons vont au paradis) is a short film directed by Samuel Tourneux and released in 2007. It was nominated for the 2007 Academy Award for Best Animated Short Film.

== Plot ==
Mr. Moulin is an elderly miser living by himself. He climbs a stack of books on top of a stepstool in order to reach a bottle of spirits. The precarious stack collapses, sending him falling to the ground. He brings the bottle with him, along with a red sock containing his savings. A priest arrives just in time to stop his fall.

Using the fall as an excuse, the priest promises Moulin that he has a device to ensure his salvation. He tries to get Moulin to sign over his savings to him, but Moulin wants to see the device in action first. The priest reveals a tank with several port holes. Moulin gets inside, and the priest puts on a show to simulate a trip to Heaven, exploiting Moulin's poor eyesight.

Convinced by the hoax, Moulin signs over his savings to the priest, who sits counting his take when there is a knock at the door. The Grim Reaper is somewhat flummoxed and explains he is late in collecting a Mr. Moulin who died in a fall involving a red sock. Thinking quickly, Moulin points to the priest, who is holding the sock with his money. The Grim Reaper advances on the terrified priest and slashes him with his scythe, splattering blood across Moulin's face.

Alone with the priest's contraption, Moulin enters and pushes a red button, which closes and locks the door, trapping him inside.
