= August Rush =

- Theatrical release poster
- Directed by: Kirsten Sheridan
- Screenplay by: Nick Castle; James V. Hart
- Story by: Paul Castro; Nick Castle
- Produced by: Richard Barton Lewis
- Starring: Freddie Highmore; Keri Russell; Jonathan Rhys Meyers; William Sadler; Terrence Howard; Robin Williams
- Cinematography: John Mathieson
- Edited by: William Steinkamp
- Music by: Mark Mancina
- Production companies: Southpaw Entertainment; CJ Entertainment
- Distributed by: Warner Bros. Pictures (North America); Odyssey Entertainment (International)
- Release date: November 21, 2007
- Running time: 114 minutes
- Countries: United States; South Korea
- Language: English
- Budget: $25 million
- Box office: $65.3 million

August Rush is a 2007 musical drama film directed by Kirsten Sheridan and produced by Richard Barton Lewis. The screenplay is by Nick Castle and James V. Hart, with a story by Paul Castro and Castle. It tells the story of an 11-year-old musical prodigy living in an orphanage who runs away to New York City. He begins to unravel the mystery of who he is, while his mother is searching for him and his father is searching for her. The many sounds and rhythms he hears throughout his journey culminate in a major instrumental composition that concludes with his score, "August's Rhapsody". The film premiered at two festivals in the United States: HATCHfest Film Festival on October 6, 2007, followed by the Chicago International Film Festival on October 18, 2007.

== Plot ==
In 1995, Lyla Novacek is a cellist studying at the Juilliard School. Louis Connelly is the lead singer of an Irish rock band. They meet and have a one-night stand but are unable to maintain contact. Lyla discovers that she is pregnant. Following an argument with her overbearing father, she is struck by a car, forcing her to prematurely give birth. While Lyla is unconscious, her father secretly puts the baby up for adoption, telling Lyla that her son died.

Eleven years later, the baby, named Evan Taylor, is living in a boys' orphanage where he is assigned to a social worker named Richard Jeffries. Evan is a musical genius and displays savant-like abilities and perfect pitch. Convinced that his parents will find him, he runs away to New York City, "following the music" with the hope that it will lead him to his family.

He finds a boy named Arthur busking in Washington Square Park and follows him to his home in a condemned theater, where Evan is introduced to "Wizard" Wallace, a vagrant musician who teaches homeless, orphaned, and runaway children to be street performers. Wizard gives Evan a spot in Washington Square Park, assigns him the stage name "August Rush" and tries to market him to clubs. When he sees the posters that Jeffries has placed for the runaway Evan, Wizard destroys them, hoping to keep Evan for his own gain.

Louis now lives in San Francisco as a talent agent, while Lyla is a music teacher in Chicago. Louis reconnects with his brothers and decides to try to find Lyla. Lyla is called to her father's deathbed, where he confesses that her son is alive. She then abandons her father to his fate and immediately begins to hunt for her son.

Arriving at Lyla's apartment in Chicago, Louis talks to one of her neighbors, who erroneously says that she is on her honeymoon. Despairing, he ends up in New York, where he regroups his band. After Jeffries meets Wizard and Arthur on the street and becomes suspicious, the police raid the derelict theater in which Wizard and his children are living. Evan (now "August") takes refuge in a church, where he befriends a little girl named Hope, who introduces him to the piano and written music. Hope brings August and his abilities to the attention of the parish pastor, who takes August to the Juilliard school, where he impresses the faculty. A rhapsody takes shape from August's notes and homework.

In New York, Lyla goes to Jeffries's office, and Jeffries identifies August as her son. While looking for him, she starts playing the cello again and accepts an offer to perform with the New York Philharmonic at a series of concerts in Central Park. August is selected to perform at the same concert. However, Wizard interrupts the rehearsal and, claiming to be his father, pulls August out of the school.

On the day of the concert, August returns to his spot in Washington Square, while Wizard makes plans to smuggle him around the country to perform. August meets Louis and, unaware of their blood relationship, they have an impromptu guitar duet. That evening, with help from Arthur, August escapes from Wizard through the subway and heads for his concert. Louis, after his own performance with his reunited band, sees Lyla's name on a banner and also heads for the park. Jeffries finds a flyer for "August Rush" with a picture and goes to the concert.

August arrives in time to conduct his rhapsody, which attracts Lyla and Louis to the audience, where they reunite. August finishes his rhapsody and, as he turns to discover his parents, smiles, knowing that he has been right all along.

== Cast ==
- Freddie Highmore as Evan Taylor / "August Rush"
- Keri Russell as Lyla Novacek, Evan's mother
- Jonathan Rhys Meyers as Louis Connelly, Evan's father
- Terrence Howard as Counselor Richard Jeffries
- Robin Williams as Maxwell "Wizard" Wallace
- William Sadler as Thomas Novacek, Lyla's father and Evan's maternal grandfather
- Marian Seldes as Alice MacNeil
- Mykelti Williamson as Reverend James
- Leon Thomas as Arthur
- Aaron Staton as Nick
- Alex O'Loughlin as Marshall Connelly, Louis's older brother and Evan's paternal uncle
- Jamia Simone Nash as Hope
- Ronald Guttman as The Professor
- Bonnie McKee as Lizzy
- Timothy Mitchum as Joey
- Becki Newton as Jennifer
- Michael Drayer as Mannix
- Tablo as Clarinet player (uncredited cameo)
- Koo Hye-sun as Girl on couch (cameo)

== Music ==
- "Moondance": written by Van Morrison; performed by Jonathan Rhys Meyers
- "This Time": written by Chris Trapper; performed by Jonathan Rhys Meyers
- "Bari Improv": written by Mark Mancina and Kaki King; performed by Kaki King
- "Ritual Dance": written by Michael Hedges; performed by Kaki King
- "Raise It Up": written by Impact Repertory Theatre; performed by Jamia Simone Nash and Impact Repertory Theatre; nominated for an Academy Award for Best Original Song
- "Dueling Guitars": written by Heitor Pereira; performed by Heitor Pereira and Doug Smith
- "Someday": written by J. Stephens; performed by John Legend
- "King of the Earth": written and Performed by John Ondrasik
- "God Bless the Child": written by Arthur Herzog Jr. and Billie Holiday; performed by Chris Botti and Paula Cole
- "La Bamba": performed by Leon Thomas III
- "August's Rhapsody"; written by Mark Mancina

The final number with Lyla and Louis begins with Lyla playing the Adagio-Moderato from Edward Elgar's Cello Concerto in E Minor.

Except for "Dueling Guitars", all of August's guitar pieces are played by American guitarist-composer Kaki King. King's hands are used in closeups for August Rush.

Composer Mark Mancina spent more than a year and a half composing the score of August Rush. "The heart of the story is how we respond and connect through music. It's about this young boy who believes that he's going to find his parents through his music. That's what drives him." The final theme of the movie was composed first. "That way I could take bits and pieces of the ending piece and relate it to the things that are happening in (August's) life. All of the themes are pieces of the puzzle, so at the end it means something because you've been subliminally hearing it throughout the film." The score was recorded at the Todd-AO Scoring Stage and the Eastwood Scoring Stage at Warner Bros.

== Production ==
In March 2003, it was announced Nick Castle had been hired to write August Rush from an idea by producer Richard B. Lewis and screenwriter Paul Castro for Ovation Entertainment. In September 2004, Kirsten Sheridan was announced as director, as well as providing a rewrite of the script. Filming began in February 2006.

== Reception ==
August Rush received mostly unfavorable reviews from film critics. The film holds a 37% approval rating on the review aggregator Rotten Tomatoes, based on 122 reviews, with an average rating of 4.83/10. The site's consensus reads: "Though featuring a talented cast, August Rush cannot overcome the flimsy direction and schmaltzy plot." On Metacritic, the film has an average score of 38 out of 100, based on 27 critics, indicating "generally unfavorable" reviews.

In a review by USA Today, Claudia Puig commented, "August Rush will not be for everyone, but it works if you surrender to its lilting and unabashedly sentimental tale of evocative music and visual poetry."

The Hollywood Reporter reviewed the film positively, writing, "The story is about musicians and how music connects people, so the movie's score and songs, created by composers Mark Mancina and Hans Zimmer, give poetic whimsy to an implausible tale."

Pam Grady of the San Francisco Chronicle called the film "an inane musical melodrama". Grady said that "the entire story is ridiculous" and that the coincidences pile on, behavior and motivations defy logic, and the characters are so thinly drawn that most of the cast is at a loss".

Edward Douglas of comingsoon.net said that it "does not take long for the movie to reveal itself as an extremely contrived and predictable movie that tries too hard to tug on the heartstrings".

Roger Ebert of the Chicago Sun-Times gave the movie three stars out of 4, calling it "a movie drenched in sentimentality, but it's supposed to be. The movie also came to a very sudden end, leaving it unfinished."

A few critics suggested that the film is essentially a musical adaptation of Oliver Twist.

=== Awards ===
Despite the mostly unfavorable reception, August Rush was praised for its music. The song "Raise It Up" was nominated for Best Original Song at the 80th Academy Awards, but lost to Falling Slowly from Once.

== Stage adaptation ==
A musical theater adaptation of August Rush premiered on May 3, 2019, at the Paramount Theatre in Aurora, Illinois. The book was written by Glen Berger, the music was composed by Mark Mancina, and the lyrics were written by both Berger and Mancina. The play was directed by John Doyle.

August Rush: A New Musical, with a new book by Nick Blaemire and new music by Tom Kitt, Van Hughes, and Bonnie McKee, was announced in 2025. A workshop presentation of the musical was presented at Open Jar Studios in December 2025. The musical's pre-Broadway run will premiere at San Diego's Old Globe Theatre in Spring 2027. It will be directed by Kathleen Marshall.
