= Raise It Up (August Rush song) =

"Raise It Up" is a 2007 song featured in the motion picture August Rush

Song by Jamia Simone Nash and IMPACT Repertory Theatre

from the album August Rush (Music from the Motion Picture)
- Released: November 13, 2007
- Genre: Gospel
- Length: 2:29
- Label: Columbia, Sony Music Soundtrax
- Songwriters: Jamal Joseph; Charles Mack; Tevin Thomas
- Producers: Jamal Joseph; Charles Mack

"Raise It Up" is a 2007 song written by Jamal Joseph, Charles Mack and Tevin Thomas for the motion picture August Rush. "Raise It Up" is performed in the film by Jamia Simone Nash and the IMPACT Repertory Theatre, an African-American youth theatre division of the New Heritage Theatre Group based in Harlem. The song was produced by Joseph and Mack.

In the film, August Rush (Freddie Highmore) wanders into Harlem and is drawn to a church by the voice of a young soloist named Hope (Nash) singing this song, which inspires him. Hope ultimately brings him to the attention of her pastor, Reverend James (Mykelti Williamson), who helps August further develop his talent.

"Raise It Up" was nominated for the Academy Award for Best Original Song at the 80th Academy Awards; however, the nomination announcement originally said "Nominees to be determined". The production notes credit the song to the Impact Repertory Theatre as a whole; however, Oscar rules allow no more than three individuals to be credited with the song for nomination purposes. (This was the same rule that prevented Beyoncé Knowles from sharing in the Oscar nomination for her 2006 song "Listen" from Dreamgirls, even though she co-wrote it.) The next day, the Academy updated its list to show Joseph, Mack and Thomas as the nominees.

The song was performed at the 80th Academy Awards by members of the Impact Repertory Theatre. On July 24, 2008, on The Young and the Restless, the characters Devon Hamilton and Ana Hamilton (played by August Rush's Nash) sang the song at a gala.
