= That's How You Know (Disney song) =

2007 song by Alan Menken and Stephen Schwartz

Song by Amy Adams

from the album Enchanted
- Released: November 20, 2007
- Genre: Pop; calypso
- Length: 3:49
- Label: Walt Disney
- Composer: Alan Menken
- Lyricist: Stephen Schwartz
- Producers: Alan Menken; Stephen Schwartz; Robbie Buchanan

"That's How You Know" is a musical number from the 2007 Disney film Enchanted, with music composed by Alan Menken and lyrics by Stephen Schwartz. It is performed by the film's lead actress, Amy Adams, and features the vocals of Marlon Saunders and other singers in the background chorus. The song appears on the soundtrack of Enchanted, which was released on November 20, 2007 in the United States.

Like the film, the song was written as an homage to and a self-parody of past Disney works, specifically such big production numbers as "Under the Sea" from The Little Mermaid and "Be Our Guest" from Beauty and the Beast, both also composed by Alan Menken.

Since its release, "That's How You Know" has been met with critical acclaim from critics and audiences alike, with many calling it the best number in the whole film. The song was nominated for Best Song at the 13th Critics' Choice Awards, Best Original Song at the 65th Golden Globe Awards, and at the 80th Academy Awards in the Best Original Song category, in which two other songs from the film were also nominated. It was also nominated at the 51st Grammy Awards in the category of Best Song Written for Motion Picture, Television or Other Visual Media. In March 2023, the song was certified Gold by the RIAA.

== Context ==
In the film, the song is performed by Giselle. During their walk through Central Park, Giselle questions Robert's (Patrick Dempsey) view on love after finding out that he has been with his girlfriend, Nancy (Idina Menzel), for five years and has yet to propose to her. She spontaneously starts to sing in order to explain to him how he should show his affection for Nancy. As Giselle sings and dances through the park, she is joined by other people in the park including buskers, a steelband, elderly dancers, Bavarian dancers, a mariachi band, and rollerbladers. They follow her to Bethesda Fountain, where they finish the song. In addition to the aforementioned Disney numbers, "That's How You Know" is played out like big numbers from other musical films such as "Thank You Very Much" from Scrooge and Consider Yourself from Oliver! (the latter also featuring dances from various people including butchers and fishmongers before ending in a flashmob).

== Chart performance ==
Chart (2008)	Peak position
US Bubbling Under Hot 100 (Billboard)	3
Canada Hot 100 (Billboard)	99

== Certifications ==
Region	Certification	Certified units/sales
United States (RIAA)	Gold	500,000^{‡}
^{‡} Sales+streaming figures based on certification alone.
