= Ever Ever After =

2007 song by Alan Menken and Stephen Schwartz

Song by Carrie Underwood

from the album Enchanted
- Released: November 20, 2007
- Recorded: 2007
- Genre: Country pop; pop rock
- Length: 3:31
- Label: Walt Disney
- Composer: Alan Menken
- Lyricist: Stephen Schwartz
- Producer: Mark Bright

Music video
- "Enchanted - Carrie Underwood - Ever Ever After" on YouTube

"Ever Ever After" is a song by American singer Carrie Underwood, written by composer Alan Menken and lyricist Stephen Schwartz for Enchanted (2007). The song, which was the last of several written for the film, appears as the fifth track on its soundtrack album. A mid-tempo country pop ballad that incorporates elements of both pop and rock music, the lyrics of "Ever Ever After" speak of falling in love and discovering one's happily ever after, as well as several other traditional elements that are often associated with fairy tales.

"Ever Ever After" was written by Menken and Schwartz to replace a duet by actors Idina Menzel and James Marsden that was meant to take place during the film's narrative. "Ever Ever After" appears as a voiceover following the film's climax. Most music critics have received the song with enthusiasm, praising its catchy melody and Underwood's vocals.

== Background ==
The musical numbers featured in Enchanted are meant to serve as plot devices, gradually progressing and modernizing in terms of style, theme and composition as the film approaches its end, evolving from a traditional musical or Broadway score into a more contemporary one. The final song to appear in the film, composer Alan Menken described "Ever Ever After" as the most modern of Enchanted's musical numbers. Actress Amy Adams, who portrays the film's heroine Giselle, commented, "we end up with Carrie Underwood's 'Ever Ever After' which is a country rock ballad. So the music continues to evolve in the film".

"Ever Ever After" was the last song to be written for Enchanted. Originally, a traditional "Disney-style" musical number titled "Enchanted" was written by Menken and Schwartz, scheduled to appear in the film as a duet between Broadway performer Idina Menzel, who portrays the character Nancy Tremaine, and actor James Marsden, who portrays Prince Edward. However, the filmmakers got the impression that the duet only succeeded in slowing down the pace of film. Menken explained, "it was just really extremely difficult that late in the game to deliver that kind of song." Ultimately, the songwriters decided to replace it with country singer Carrie Underwood's voiceover performance "Ever Ever After" that occurs following the film's climax. In the film, the song is first heard after Giselle and Robert finally confess their love for each other after they defeat Queen Narissa. While Giselle and Robert reunite with Robert's daughter Morgan during the montage, Edward and Nancy, who were both at one point affianced to Giselle and Robert respectively, are shown deciding to marry each other.

== Composition ==
"Ever Ever After" is a country power ballad, described by lyricist Stephen Schwartz as "a grown-up, contemporary pop number". The song also incorporates some elements of country rock. According to Musicnotes.com, "Ever Ever After" is written in common time in the key of G major at a moderately fast tempo of 112 beats per minute. The song's instrumentation includes both guitar and piano, as well as a combination of both lead and background vocals.

== Critical reception ==
"Ever Ever After" has been positively received by music critics. Entertainment Weekly's Joy Piedmont described the song as both "catchy" and listenable. She also praised Underwood's vocal performance, writing, "she sounds great singing it." Jacqueline Rupp of Common Sense Media wrote, "Carrie Underwood's power ballad, 'Ever Ever After' will have widespread appeal for all ages". Allmusic commented, "Carrie Underwood steals the show with her rapturous pop tune". Amazon.com reviewer Elisabeth Vincentelli wrote, "Carrie Underwood brings us back into the 21st century with the single 'Ever Ever After'".

Filmtracks.com reacted less favorably towards the song, describing it as "stale" and "a bit too grating in its instrumentation and vocalization".

== Music video ==
Carrie Underwood as her animated counterpart in the music video for "Ever Ever After."

The release of "Ever Ever After" was accompanied by a music video, in which Underwood appears as its protagonist. The video was directed by Roman White, who has directed the majority of Underwood's music videos, and borrows its visual style from Enchanted by combining both animated and live-action sequences and "interspersing them with scenes from the film." In the video, Underwood first appears as an animated version of herself in the fictional kingdom of Andalasia, eventually transporting into the live-action world of present-day Manhattan, New York, much like Giselle does in the film. Once in New York, Underwood enamors a young man who pursues her as she makes her way through the city, all-the-while singing the song's lyrics that appear to have a positive influence on many of city's residents. The video concludes with Underwood finally uniting with her pursuer. They finally get married in Andalasia, imitating a scene from the film.

Critical reception towards the video, although generally taciturn, has been mostly mixed. PopSugar wrote, "as ridiculous as the video is, it definitely made me giggle". Joy Piedmont of Entertainment Weekly questioned the video's logic. The reviewer also felt that Underwood is less expressive than her animated counterpart.
