= So Close (Enchanted song) =

2007 song by Alan Menken and Stephen Schwartz

Song by Jon McLaughlin

from the album Enchanted
- Released: November 20, 2007
- Genre: Orchestral pop
- Length: 3:49
- Label: Walt Disney
- Composer: Alan Menken
- Lyricist: Stephen Schwartz
- Producers: Menken; Schwartz; Robbie Buchanan

"So Close" is a song written by composer Alan Menken and lyricist Stephen Schwartz for the musical fantasy film Enchanted (2007), recorded by American singer Jon McLaughlin. In the film, the song is performed by McLaughlin as himself, a band vocalist, musically accompanying main characters Giselle and Robert as they dance together at a costume ball. The song's lyrics describe both their relationship with each other, as well as Giselle's journey and growth as a character.

Enchanted's songs become more contemporary in style as Giselle matures into a modern-day young woman, with "So Close" resembling the style of music featured in Disney films during the 1990s, a theme similarly reflected by the character's choice of wardrobe during the scene. A romantic pop ballad, Menken and Schwartz based "So Close" on the title song from Disney's Beauty and the Beast (1991), a song Menken himself had written the music for, while its cinematography was designed to evoke the camera movement in Beauty and the Beast's famous ballroom sequence. The track was arranged and produced by Robbie Buchanan, who had previously arranged pop versions of the theme songs from Beauty and the Beast, Aladdin (1992) and Pocahontas (1995).

The song has received generally negative reviews from film and music critics, who were unimpressed with its slow tempo. "So Close" was one of three songs from Enchanted nominated for an Academy Award for Best Original Song at the 80th Academy Awards. McLaughlin's live performance during the telecast was met with critical acclaim, and is credited with introducing the singer to a wider audience while bolstering sales of his own material.

== Writing and recording ==
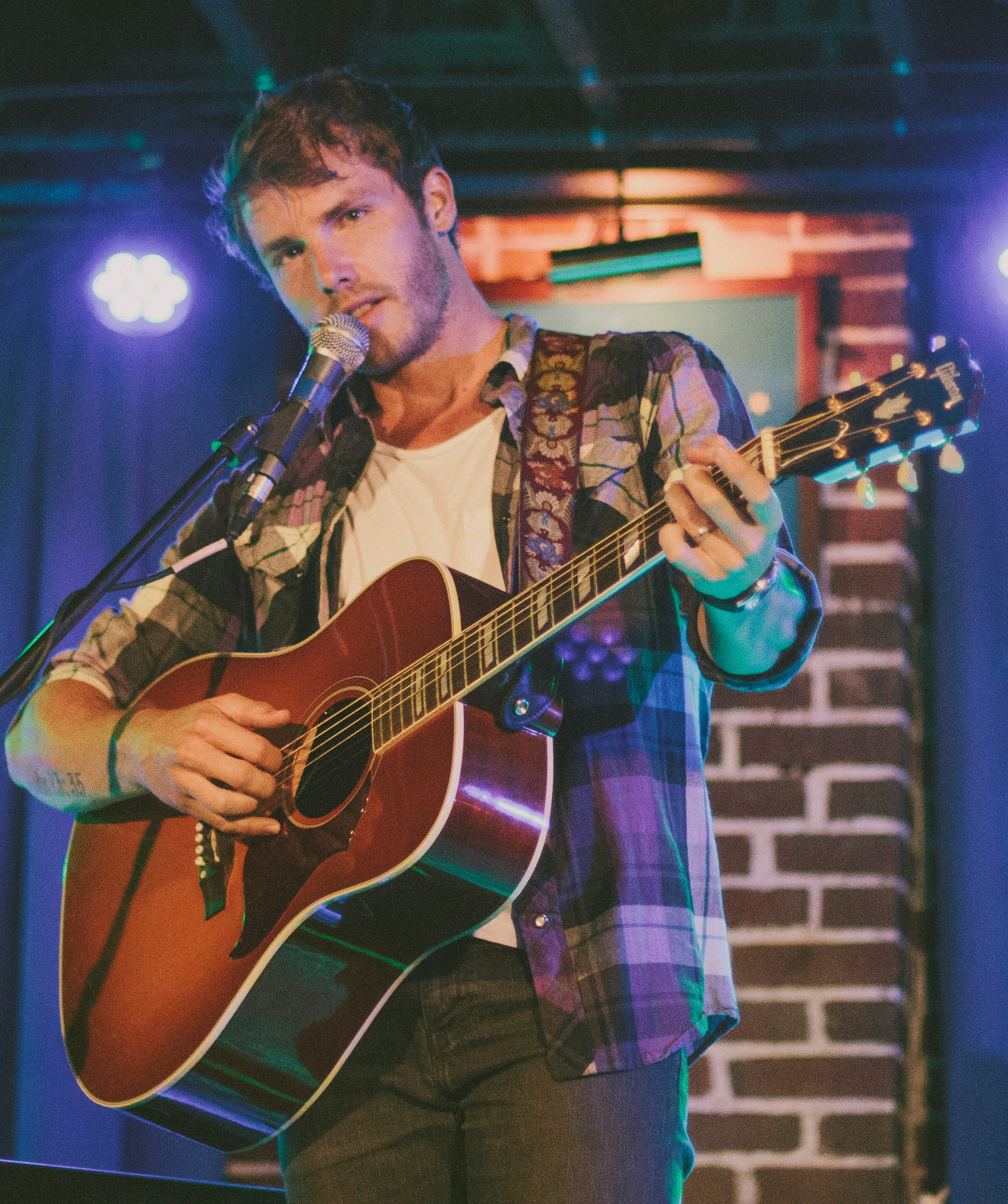
American pop rock singer Jon McLaughlin (pictured).

"So Close" was written by composer Alan Menken and lyricist Stephen Schwartz. Menken and Schwartz based "So Close" on the title song from Beauty and the Beast (1991), a song Menken himself had written the music for. In addition to conceiving the song's title, director Kevin Lima specifically asked that the song's final lyrics be "So close and still so far" to mirror the idea that this appears to be Enchanted's main characters Giselle and Robert's final moment together. The songwriters enlisted Robbie Buchanan to produce the track; Buchanan had previously arranged and produced the single version of "Beauty and the Beast", as well as "A Whole New World" and "Colors of the Wind" from Aladdin (1992) and Pocahontas (1995), respectively.

Menken recorded an early demo version of the song before it was forwarded to Buchanan, who created its backing track. In addition to Buchanan, many musicians contributed to the track before it was finally returned to the producer, and then Menken. Menken proceeded to use Buchanan's track to orchestrate the song while developing an instrumental "middle section" during which the characters would dance. Menken and Schwartz co-produced. Although arranger Danny Troob contributed some orchestration to the song, he attributes the majority of its arrangement to Buchanan. "So Close" was recorded by singer-songwriter Jon McLaughlin, who was recruited from his record label by the film's music supervisor after Menken and Schwartz began searching for a suitable singer. Instrumentalists on the track include bassist Neil Stubenhaus, drummer John Robinson and guitarist Michael Landau, while Buchanan himself contributed both piano and synthesizer.

Menken had written an alternative version of "So Close", which the filmmakers enjoyed but ultimately rejected in favor of the final version used in the film. Additionally, a song originally written for the villain Queen Narissa (Susan Sarandon) was eliminated from the film because Lima felt that the musical number would occur too close to "So Close", wanting to prevent the film from becoming a "full out" musical. The song was released on November 20, 2007, as part of the film's soundtrack.

== Context ==
=== Background ===
Stylistically, the songs in Enchanted progress and become more modern over the course of the film, with Amy Adams describing "So Close" as "a lot more poppy" than previous songs "Happy Working Song" and "That's How You Know". Schwartz explained that the score grows increasingly modern as Giselle develops into "a contemporary young woman", likening "So Close" to the 1990s era of Disney musicals, such as Beauty and the Beast and Pocahontas. The decision to have the song performed by an "outer voice" as opposed to a main character was derived from the reality of this particular moment in the film, and the songwriters agreed that it would be more appropriate to "have somebody sing it right in that ball." Troob observed that, although the actors pretend that the song is being performed by a professional singer, the track is "a pop record with a pop orchestra playing behind it." Patrick Dempsey initially protested the idea of singing a small portion of the song, but Schwartz insisted. The sequence was deliberately choreographed to reference the camera movement and angles used in the famous ballroom sequence from Beauty and the Beast, as Lima had envisioned replicating the scene in live-action.

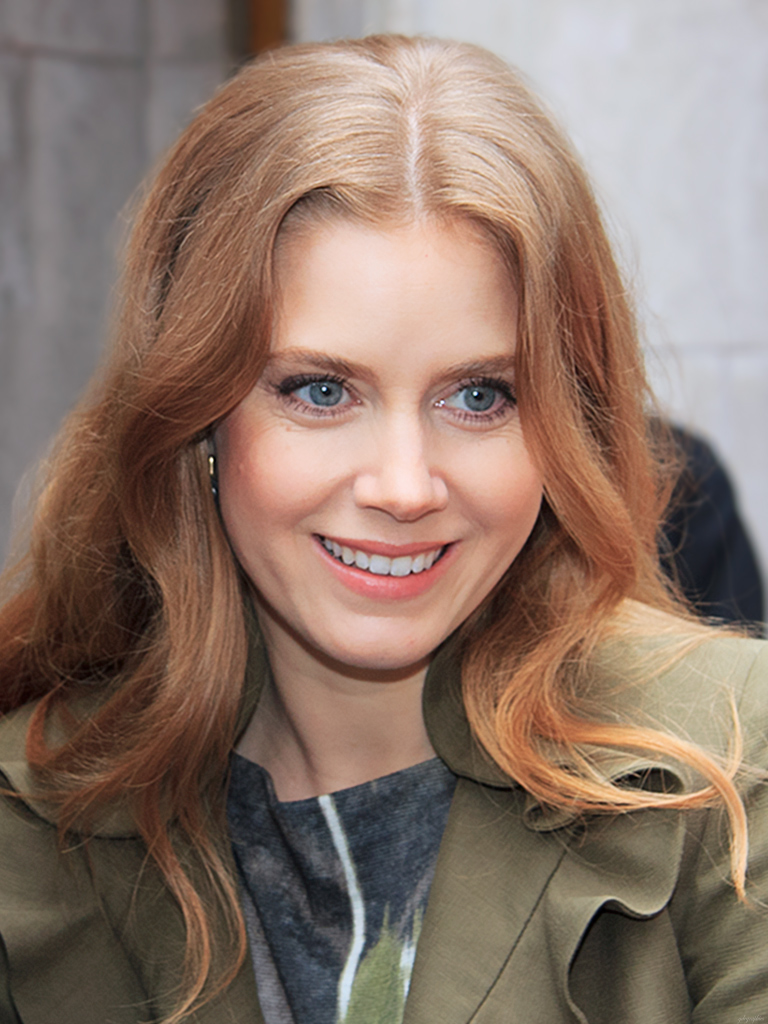
Actress Amy Adams, who portrays Giselle, initially found it difficult to trust co-star Patrick Dempsey (Robert) until taking several dance classes together to prepare for the ballroom sequence.

Adams and Dempsey attended several dance classes together prior to filming the scene. Despite already having experience as a solo dancer, Adams found the process unusual as she was required to "break down some of my own barriers" in order to learn how to dance with a partner for the first time. She was initially reluctant to allow Dempsey to lead, describing herself as "stubborn" and suffering the loss of a few toenails in the process. Adams found it difficult to adjust until a professional ballroom dancer reviewed their progress and advised her to "surrender" to Dempsey, reminding her "that you are dancing your own dance even though you are being led". The actors rehearsed several times before they finally trusted each other. Adams received this as an important "life lesson" that can be applied to real-life relationships and situations: "working with Patrick ... was really important ... I had to learn to trust him fully to lead me backwards through a crowd of people and I think really helped us form communication and trust on set, because we were forced to tell each other what we really needed.”

Giselle's transition from a fairy tale character into a "real woman" is exemplified by her wardrobe choices. The purple gown Adams wears during the ball sequence was designed by costume designer Mona May, who drew inspiration from costumes used in 1930s musical films, specifically gowns worn by actress Ginger Rogers, as well as several concept drawings of early Disney Princesses. However, the costume designer also wanted the dress to resemble an outfit purchased from Bergdorf Goodman, explaining, "it's so important to be slick and modern, to be not fairy tale anymore, because we've seen the fairy tale ... She's now a modern girl. She's deciding to stay here to really understand this world, to know her feelings and who she is", an idea she believes is supported by the gown's silhouette and color. May described Giselle's final look as "completely modern", devoid pouf and curls in her hair. Identifying Giselle as one of Disney's first princesses "to save the prince", May also wanted her gown to demonstrate the character's "feminine strength". Although Giselle is shown undergoing a makeover during a shopping montage, the filmmakers avoided showing Giselle trying on different outfits to ensure that her final selection remains a surprise. Adams helped design the "glass slippers" her character wears during the scene, which were custom made to allow her to dance. Meanwhile, Roberts' outfit pays homage to the Beast's tuxedo in Beauty and the Beast.

Executive producer Chris Chase decided to set the scene in the Woolworth Building, a skyscraper in Manhattan, because he believes that the building "is such a medieval-looking castle", containing gargoyles in addition to being "very decorated." He described it as "a modern-day reflection of a castle", thus adhering to the film's theme of both reflecting and contrasting traditional fairy tales.

=== Use in Enchanted ===
The sequence is preceded by a shopping montage, in which Giselle (Adams) is treated to a shopping spree by Robert's daughter Morgan (Rachel Covey) to update her wardrobe in preparation for The King & Queen's Ball. The dress Giselle ultimately wears is meant to signify her "transformation into a contemporary New Yorker", as opposed to a more opulent outfit. Giselle and her betrothed, Prince Edward (James Marsden), arrive at The Kings & Queens Ball, a costume ball where they meet Robert (Dempsey) and his fiancé Nancy (Idina Menzel). Nancy appears to be the only character aware of the undeniable chemistry and romantic tension between Robert and Giselle. For "The King and Queen's Waltz", the conductor invites all gentlemen to ask a lady with whom they did not attend the ball dance, requiring the attendees to switch partners. Edward immediately invites Nancy to dance and, after a moment of hesitation, Robert asks Giselle to do the same, allowing the two to "finalize [their] bond" with each other. In the film, McLaughlin plays himself and performs "So Close" diegetically as a band vocalist, accompanied by an orchestra. The singer was not expecting to also appear in the film.

The song offers "an outer voice that mirrors Giselle's inner emotional journey." While Giselle and Robert dance, the other couples vacate the center of the ballroom floor, allowing them more room. Robert quietly sings a few of the song's lines to Giselle, prior to which he had vehemently refused to sing for much of the film. The couples dance in quadruple meter. Nancy eventually interrupts them, reuniting with Robert as Edward prepares to leave the ball (and New York) with Giselle. Earlier in the film, Giselle had promised to Edward that they will return to Andalasia after the ball. While Edward retrieves Giselle's wrap, she gazes at Robert completing their dance with Nancy as the song concludes. Menken described "So Close" as "a heartfelt, emotional moment" in the film. According to Jordan Iacobucci of Screen Rant, the ballad "tells the entire story of Enchanted in the span of three minutes", with Giselle and Robert realizing how close they were to finding their happy ending with each other, before it was ultimately taken away.

== Composition ==
According to the song's official sheet music published by Walt Disney Music Publishing on Musicnotes.com, "So Close" was written in the key of E major, performed "slowly" in common time. The track lasts a duration of three minutes and forty-nine seconds. According to The Musical Theater of Stephen Schwartz: From Godspell to Wicked author Paul R. Laird, the song is performed in 4/4 time "with a prevailing triplet motion", thus the ballad is not a waltz since it is not written in 3/4 time. Filmtracks.com identified the song as a "modern ... contemporary pop" ballad. Musically, "So Close" resembles Menken's "era of Disney songwriting", with the composer himself describing the track as "a more contemporary, adult ballad" and agreeing that the song is "really in my ballad style". Troob described "So Close" as a "very straight-ahead pop ballad" reminiscent of music popular during the 1980s and 1990s. Peter Knegt of IndieWire described the ballad as "mid-1990s slow dance sounding". In addition to being a pop song, the track employs heavy pop orchestration; instruments such as bass, drums, guitar, piano and synthesizer can be heard throughout the piece. Laird described Menken's composition as "a flowing tune with a wide range that takes [McLaughlin's] tenor to a d-flat", which he performs in falsetto. Performing the track using a "melancholic voice", McLaughlin's vocal range on the song spans three octaves, from B_{3}-Db_{6}.

"So Close" is a love song. Lyrically, the track is about "the bittersweet emotion of finding love that may be slipping away at the fingertips", according to Megan Forrester of The Panther. The song features lyrics that mirror the film and Giselle's relationship with Robert, beginning with "You're in my arms/And all the word is gone/The music playing on/for only two/so close together" and ending "...So close, and still/So far..." to indicate that there is still separation between the two, despite how close they've grown. This last line refers to the characters' close physical proximity to each other but different fates. McLaughlin's raspy, sentimental vocals and melody contradict with the song's cynical lyrics. Laird observed that, in addition to conveying the song's dual message, Schwartz is less reliant on rhyming words, but nonetheless uses lyrics such as "happy end" instead of "happy ending" in order to rhyme with "pretend". The ballad's lyrics also consist of puns.

== Reception ==
Critical reception towards "So Close" has been generally negative. Filmtracks.com described the song as "stale". The Houston Chronicle's Amy Biancolli criticized its slow tempo, writing that "musical nitpickers ... might wish that [the] climactic ballroom 'waltz' had actually been in three-four time." Golderby writer Andrew Carden dismissed "So Close" as "a real snooze". Jared Johnson, writing for The Sojourn, conversely described the track as "a beautiful love ballad", and Anvita Singh of The Indian Express called it a blast.

"So Close" was nominated for an Academy Award for Best Original Song at the 80th Academy Awards in 2008, in addition to "Happy Working Song" and "That's How You Know" from Enchanted. "So Close" was the only nominated song from Enchanted not performed by Adams. The three songs had collectively sold 177,000 digital downloads prior to the awards ceremony. Although Peter Knegt of IndieWire enjoyed Enchanted's songs, he felt that "So Close" was undeserving of a nomination. Billboard polled its readers, asking them which of the five nominees they hoped would win Best Original Song, 10% of whom voted for "So Close". "So Close" is ranked as McLaughlin's most streamed song on Spotify, having accumulated more than 16 million streams as of January 2019.

In 2020, Ross Tanenbaum of Screen Rant ranked "So Close" Disney's fourth most underrated song, describing it as a charming ballad with "good lyrics, an enchanting melody, and a soothing vocal performance." The same publication ranked "So Close" the best song from Enchanted.

== Live performances and covers ==
McLaughlin performed "So Close" live at the 80th Academy Awards in 2008, where the song had been nominated for Best Original Song. The performance was introduced by Dempsey, and dancers dressed as the film's main characters recreated the ballroom scene on stage. McLaughlin's performance received critical acclaim. Considered to be his breakthrough as a recording artist, the performance is credited with establishing McLaughlin as "an overnight sensation" and introducing his music to a wider audience. Following McLaughlin's performance, Amanda Valentovic of Bandsintown deemed the song a "classic". McLaughlin's debut studio album Indiana experienced a 1,514% sales increase on Amazon overnight, resulting in the album peaking at number-one on its Movers & Shakers chart. AllMusic biographer Marisa Brown said the singer "used the resulting momentum to drum up support for his third studio album, OK Now". Charlee Vaughan and Jared Johnson, both critics for The Sojourn, lamented the fact that the singer excluded the song from his 2012 and 2013 performances at the Phillippe Performing Arts Center, which Vaughan found unusual considering its popularity.

In 2009, Schwartz included the song in his set list for his concert Defying Gravity: The Music of Stephen Schwartz and Friends, in which it was covered by singer Scott Coulter. Singer John Barrowman and actress Jodie Prenger covered the song as a duet for the former's 2010 eponymous studio album. Barrowman had met Prenger when she auditioned for the British talent competition I'd Do Anything in 2008, and asked her to record "So Close" with him in September 2009, to which she immediately agreed. Prenger was the first artist Barrowman considered for the duet. Adrian Edwards of BBC wrote that their rendition failed to leave "any lasting impression."

Japanese singer Koda Kumi covered the song in 2017 for the Japanese cover album, Thank You, Disney. Like the rest of the songs from the album, she retained the English lyrics, although the musical arrangement became pop and jazz influenced.
