= Caladrius =

Mythical bird with healing capabilities

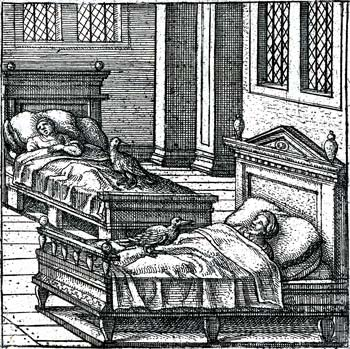
An illustration of the Caladrius' prophecies from the 1588 edition of the Physiologus. Copperplate by Pieter van der Borcht (I).

The caladrius (or charadrius), also known as the dhalion in Greek, according to Christian mythology in the Physiologus, is a snow-white bird that lives in the king's house. It is said to be able to take the sickness into itself and then fly away, dispersing the sickness and healing both itself and the sick person. The caladrius legend formed part of medieval bestiary materials, which typically provided a Christian moralization for the animals they discussed.

== Origin ==
It has been theorized that the caladrius is based on a real bird. Due to descriptions of it being completely white with no black on it, it is possible that it was based on the dove, or possibly some sort of water bird such as the heron. The art historian Louis Réau believed it was most likely a white plover.

== In medieval bestiaries ==
Medieval interpretations focused on the diagnostic potential of the bird: if it looks into the face of a sick person, the person will live; if it looks away, the person will die. This is compatible with the idea that the Caladrius' look draws the sickness into itself; the bird is then said to fly up to the sun, where the disease is burned up and destroyed. In the Christian moralization, the Caladrius represents Christ, who is pure white without a trace of the blackness of sin. The bird shows how Christ turns away from unrepentant sinners and casts them off; but those to whom he turns his face, he makes whole again. Sometimes this moral is used specifically against the Jews to describe how, because the Jews did not believe, Christ turned his face from them and toward the Gentiles, taking away and carrying their sins to the cross.

== In popular culture ==
In the Saturday Night Live sketch, "Theodoric of York, Medieval Barber", the title character (played by Steve Martin), uses a caladrius (portrayed by a live bird, most likely some form of dove or pigeon) in an attempt to diagnose a patient. The difficulties of using live animals on live television provided most of the humor for the few seconds of the bird's appearance.

In the video game Age of Mythology: The Titans, a myth unit available to the Atlanteans is the Caladria, which serves as a flying scout and healer, though it more closely resembled an angel than a bird.

A song dedicated to the Caladrius ("Pasărea Calandrinon") appears on the album "Cantafabule", released in 1975 by Romanian rock group Transsylvania Phoenix.

Caladrius is a demon in the Megami Tensei video game series.

The Japanese light novel Redo of Healer mentions it as a monster which is considered a God by a demon race tribe. It has the power to devour diseases and also spread them.

In Hollow Earth (2012), by John and Carole Barrowman, the first book of the Hollow Earth Trilogy, the caladrius is a mythical bird that can see the future.

Caladrius is the name of a minor character in the video game Dragon Age: Origins. He is associated with a plot that involves healers addressing a mysterious new plague actually using this as cover for their illegal slave trade in stolen "patients".

In "Brute of All Evil" by Devon Monk, a doctor is a caladrius. She takes human form and serves as the town's supernatural doctor as well as taking care of humans.

Caladrius birds and medicinal uses of their tears are an element of the novel Just Stab Me Now by Jill Bearup. They are described as moody creatures that look like the mix of a swan and a peacock, with pearly-white feathers.

The capture of the rare mythical bird as part of a Birder of the Year competition serves as a major plot point of the 2024 historical romance novel, The Ornithologist’s Field Guide to Romance by India Holton.

In the InCryptid series by Seanan McGuire, a caladrius named Dr. Morrow is a minor character who works at a cryptid hospital.
