= Another Side (John Barrowman album) =

Studio album by John Barrowman
- Released: 12 November 2007
- Recorded: Cardiff (vocals) and London (band)
- Genre: Easy listening
- Length: 48:15
- Label: Sony BMG
- Producer: Graham Stack

John Barrowman chronology
Aspects of Lloyd Webber (1997)	Another Side (2007)	Music Music Music (2008)

Another Side is an album released on 12 November 2007 by John Barrowman under the Sony BMG label. The album is composed entirely of chosen cover songs. Speaking of his decision to release his solo album, Barrowman stated that it wasn't about launching a pop career, but about giving people a chance to see "Another Side" to him as an entertainer. The album reached number 22 on the UK Album Charts and was certified gold on 11 January 2008; Barrowman was subsequently presented with a 'Gold Disc' to acknowledge this on The Alan Titchmarsh Show in February of that year.

== Track listing ==
No.	Title	Writer(s)	Original artist	Length
1.	"All Out of Love"	Graham Russell, Clive J Davis	Air Supply	3:53
2.	"You're So Vain"	Carly E Simon	Carly Simon	3:53
3.	"She's Always a Woman"	Billy Joel	Billy Joel	3:21
4.	"Time After Time"	Cyndi Lauper, Robert Andrew Hyman	Cyndi Lauper	3:57
5.	"Weekend in New England"	Randy S Edelman	Barry Manilow	3:45
6.	"Every Little Thing She Does Is Magic"	Sting	The Police	2:31
7.	"If You Leave Me Now"	Peter P Cetera	Chicago	3:41
8.	"Your Song"	Elton John, Bernie Taupin	Elton John	3:17
9.	"Please Remember Me"	Rodney Crowell, Will Jennings	Rodney Crowell	4:20
10.	"Heaven"	Bryan Adams, James Douglas Vallance	Bryan Adams	4:03
11.	"Being Alive"	Stephen Sondheim	Dean Jones, in Company	3:12
12.	"Feeling Good"	Leslie Bricusse, Anthony George Newley	Cy Grant, in The Roar of the Greasepaint - The Smell of the Crowd	3:57
13.	"All by Myself"	Sergei Rachmaninoff, Eric Carmen	Eric Carmen	4:25
