= Barrowman =

Barrowman is a surname. Notable people with the surname include:

- Andrew Barrowman (born 1984), Scottish footballer
- Carole Barrowman (born 1959), Scottish-American writer, professor, and columnist.
- Doug Barrowman (born 1965), Scottish businessman whose companies promoted schemes to contractors now pursued by HMRC for tax avoidance
- John Barrowman (born 1967), Scottish-American actor
- Mike Barrowman (born 1968), American swimmer
