= Songs I Wrote and Later Recorded =

EP by Jon McLaughlin
- Released: 2005
- Recorded: 2005
- Genre: Pop rock
- Length: 38:46
- Label: Independent

Jon McLaughlin chronology
Jon McLaughlin (2004)	Songs I Wrote and Later Recorded (2005)	Industry (2007)

Songs I Wrote and Later Recorded is an independent EP by Jon McLaughlin, released in the United States in May 2005 before signing with Island Records. The second track, "Anthem for American Teenagers" was later rerecorded and used on McLaughlin's Island Records album debut, Indiana.

== Track listing ==
1. "Conversations"
2. "Anthem for American Teenagers"
3. "Spot in Line"
4. "The Whole World"
5. "Love"
6. "One of Four"
7. "Places I Already Know"
8. "A Song You Might Hear At a Wedding"
