= Bone Quill =

2013 novel by John Barrowman and Carole Barrowman

- First edition
- Author: John and Carole Barrowman
- Illustrator: Andrew Pinder
- Language: English
- Genre: Young Adult/Fantasy
- Publisher: Buster Books
- Publication date: 2013
- Publication place: United Kingdom
- Pages: 329
- ISBN: 9781780550312
- Preceded by: Hollow Earth
- Followed by: The Book of Beasts

Bone Quill is the sequel to Hollow Earth from sibling writing pair John Barrowman and Carole Barrowman, published in February 2013.

== Plot ==
In this book the two young adventurers try to find the bone quill to help them in their quest along with the book of beasts to a) find their father and b) save everything.
