= Promising Promises =

Studio album by Jon McLaughlin
- Released: May 22, 2012
- Recorded: 2011–2012
- Genre: Piano pop, pop rock
- Length: 58:16
- Label: Razor & Tie
- Producer: Jon McLaughlin

Jon McLaughlin chronology
OK Now (2008)	Promising Promises (2012)	Holding My Breath (2013)

Singles from Forever If Ever
- 1. "What I Want" Released: April 2011

Singles from Promising Promises
- 1. "Summer Is Over" Released: January 10, 2012

Alternative cover
- Forever If Ever artwork

Promising Promises is the third full-length studio album by American singer-songwriter Jon McLaughlin. The album was released on May 22, 2012 in the United States. Promising Promises was preceded by its first single, "Summer is Over" (featuring Sara Bareilles), in January 2012.

McLaughlin originally released Forever If Ever on September 6, 2011, in which he financed and self-released the album. He received a new contract with Razor & Tie where his collection of songs from Forever If Ever were re-released with the omission of three old songs and an addition of three new songs.

== Track listing ==
As confirmed by Amazon.com:

Forever If Ever
No.	Title	Length
1.	"Without You Now"	4:08
2.	"A Little Too Hard (And A Little Too Fast)"	3:29
3.	"Summer is Over"	5:03
4.	"Promising Promises"	4:46
5.	"If Only I"	5:25
6.	"Maybe It's Over" (featuring Xenia Martinez)	4:14
7.	"What I Want"	3:51
8.	"I'll Follow You"	4:32
9.	"You Are What I'm Here For"	5:25
10.	"I Brought This On Myself"	3:23
11.	"My Girl Tonight"	3:53
12.	"These Crazy Times" (includes hidden track "Wool Over Eyes")	9:57
13.	"Forever If Ever" (bonus track)	4:21
Total length:		62:27

Promising Promises
No.	Title	Length
1.	"Promising Promises"	4:44
2.	"You Never Know"	4:30
3.	"Summer is Over" (featuring Sara Bareilles)	5:00
4.	"The Atmosphere"	3:49
5.	"What I Want"	3:49
6.	"I'll Follow You"	4:33
7.	"Maybe It's Over" (featuring Xenia Martinez)	4:15
8.	"If Only I"	5:26
9.	"Falling"	4:12
10.	"Without You Now"	4:10
11.	"My Girl Tonight"	3:55
12.	"These Crazy Times" (includes hidden track "Wool Over Eyes")	9:54
Total length:		58:16

iTunes Store deluxe edition
No.	Title	Length
13.	"Without You Now" (Stripped & Unplugged)	4:12
14.	"Maybe It's Over" (Stripped & Unplugged)	5:24
15.	"What I Want" (Stripped & Unplugged)	3:48
16.	"Summer is Over" (featuring Sara Bareilles) (music video)	4:10
17.	"The Making of Promising Promises" (video)	9:58
Total length:		85:48

Best Buy exclusive edition
No.	Title	Length
13.	"Promising Promises" (Piano Version)	5:10
14.	"Summer is Over" (Piano Version)	5:13
15.	"If Only I" (Piano Version)	5:09
16.	"These Crazy Times" (Piano Version)	4:46
Total length:		78:34

== Chart performance ==
Chart performance for Forever If Ever
Chart (2011)	Peak position
US Billboard 200	84
US Digital Albums (Billboard)	23
US Top Christian Albums (Billboard)	3
US Top Rock Albums (Billboard)	12

Chart performance for Promises Promises
Chart (2012)	Peak position
US Billboard 200	113
