= Music Music Music =

Studio album by John Barrowman
- Released: November 24, 2008
- Genre: Pop music, musical theatre
- Label: Sony BMG
- Producer: Graham Stack, Simon Franglen, Chris Braide

John Barrowman chronology
Another Side (2007)	Music Music Music (2008)	John Barrowman (2010)

Music Music Music is a 2008 album by John Barrowman preceded by the digital-only single "What About Us?", written by Gary Barlow and Chris Braide. The album consists mostly of cover versions and was produced by Simon Franglen (who has worked with Celine Dion, Whitney Houston, Barbra Streisand, The Ten Tenors) and Graham Stack (who has worked with Kylie Minogue, Tina Turner, Rod Stewart), with the exception of the first single "What About Us?" (UK #122) which was produced by Chris Braide. The album debuted and peaked at #35 in the UK, making it Barrowman's second top forty album, after the #22 peak of Another Side in 2007. The set also produced his first UK Top 75 charting single, "I Made It Through the Rain", which spent one week in the charts at #14 in August 2009.

== Track listing ==
Adapted from Discogs.

No.	Title	Writer(s)	Length
1.	"What About Us?"	Gary Barlow, Chris Braide	3:48
2.	"Can't Take My Eyes Off You"	Bob Crewe, Bob Gaudio	3:20
3.	"You'll Think Of Me"	Darrell Brown, Ty Lacy, Dennis Matkosky	3:57
4.	"I Made It Through the Rain"	Gerard Kenny, Drey Shepperd, Barry Manilow, Bruce Sussman, Jack Feldman	4:30
5.	"You Don't Have to Say You Love Me"	Vicki Wickham, Simon Napier-Bell, Pino Donaggio, Vito Pallavicini	2:41
6.	"Right Here Waiting"	Richard Marx	4:24
7.	"Uptown Girl"	Billy Joel	2:46
8.	"Both Sides Now"	Joni Mitchell	3:16
9.	"Angel"	Sarah McLachlan	4:31
10.	"I Know Him So Well" (duet with Daniel Boys)	Benny Andersson, Tim Rice, Björn Ulvaeus	4:03
11.	"I Am What I Am"	Jerry Herman	2:50
12.	"From A Distance"	Julie Gold	4:32
13.	"I Know Him So Well" (solo)	Andersson, Rice, Ulvaeus	4:02

== Personnel ==
- David Keary – guitar
- Martin Elliot – bass guitar
- Matthew Brind – piano
- Mark Pusey – drums
