= John Barrowman (album) =

Studio album by John Barrowman
- Released: 1 March 2010
- Genre: Pop music, musical theatre
- Label: Sony BMG, Arista
- Producer: TBA

John Barrowman chronology
Music Music Music (2008)	John Barrowman (2010)	You Raise Me Up (2014)

John Barrowman is the self-titled third studio album by musician and actor, John Barrowman. Released on 1 March 2010, the album entered the UK Albums Chart at number 11. This was the highest chart rating of any of Barrowman's albums to date.

== Track listing ==
No.	Title	Writer(s)	Length
1.	"When I Get My Name In Lights"	Peter Allen	2:16
2.	"One Night Only"	Lyrics by Tom Eyen, Music by Henry Krieger	3:24
3.	"Copacabana"	Barry Manilow	3:13
4.	"I Won't Send Roses"	Jerry Herman	3:24
5.	"Memory"	Andrew Lloyd Webber	5:21
6.	"The Kid Inside"	Craig Carnelia	3:38
7.	"My Eyes Adored You"	Bob Crewe	3:05
8.	"Don't Cry Out Loud"	Peter Allen	4:00
9.	"So Close" (duet with Jodie Prenger)	Lyrics by Stephen Schwartz, Music by Alan Menken	3:43
10.	"Unusual Way"	Maury Yeston	4:14
11.	"You'll Never Walk Alone"	Lyrics by Oscar Hammerstein II, Music by Richard Rodgers	3:36
12.	"The Winner Takes It All"	Benny Andersson, Björn Ulvaeus	4:57
13.	"Oh, What a Night"	Bob Gaudio	2:53
14.	"The Doctor and I" (exclusive iTunes bonus track) (reworking of "The Wizard and I"))	Stephen Schwartz, John Barrowman	4:06
