= Industry (EP) =

EP by Jon McLaughlin
- Released: February 20, 2007
- Recorded: 2006
- Genre: Pop rock
- Length: 16:34
- Label: Island
- Producer: Greg Wells

Jon McLaughlin chronology
Songs I Wrote and Later Recorded (2005)	Industry (EP) (2007)	Indiana (2007)

Industry (also known as Jon McL) is the first official release by American rock singer-songwriter Jon McLaughlin as a signed artist with Island Records. The four-song EP by Jon McLaughlin, released on February 20, 2007, contains songs from his May 2007-released debut album Indiana. The first single from the EP was the promoting "Industry". Though second single "Beautiful Disaster" appears on the EP too, it is considered as the first single from Indiana.

== Track listing ==
1. "Industry" – 4:01
2. "Beautiful Disaster" – 4:13
3. "Praying to the Wrong God" – 4:08
4. "Human" – 4:12
