= Beating My Heart =

Single by Jon McLaughlin

from the album OK Now
- Released: June 17, 2008
- Genre: Pop rock; electropop
- Length: 3:53
- Label: Island Def Jam
- Songwriter: Jon McLaughlin
- Producer: John Fields

Jon McLaughlin singles chronology
"Proud Father" (2007)	"Beating My Heart" (2008)	"What I Want" (2011)

Music video
- "Beating My Heart" on YouTube

"Beating My Heart" is a song by American singer and songwriter Jon McLaughlin. It was released on June 17, 2008, through The Island Def Jam Music Group as the lead and only single from his sophomore album, OK Now (2008).

== Critical reception ==
Chuck Taylor of Billboard praised the song, saying "[Beating My Heart] is a joyous uptempo romantic romp, featuring hook after hook, from tinkling piano to driving percussion and a start-and-stop bridge, alongside a joyous effortless vocal that soars with falsetto to the high heavens."

== Music video ==
The music video was shot in Malibu, California. It was directed by Ryan Travis and was released on July 7, 2008.

== Track listing ==
Digital download
No.	Title	Length
1.	"Beating My Heart"	3:53

== Charts ==
Chart (2008–09)	Peak position
US Adult Pop Airplay (Billboard)	18
US Hot Christian Songs (Billboard)	27

== Release history ==
Region	Date	Format	Label	Ref.
United States	June 17, 2008	Digital download	Island Def Jam	
United States	July 22, 2008	Top 40 radio	Island Def Jam	
