= Like Us =

Studio album by Jon McLaughlin
- Released: October 9, 2015
- Recorded: 2014–2015
- Genre: Piano pop, pop rock
- Label: Razor & Tie
- Producer: John Fields

Jon McLaughlin chronology
Holding My Breath (2013)	Like Us (2015)

Like Us is the fifth full-length studio album by American singer-songwriter Jon McLaughlin. The album was released on October 9, 2015, in the United States. It was preceded by the singles "Before You" and "I Want You Anyway".

== Track listing ==
As confirmed by Amazon.com:

Like Us
No.	Title	Length
1.	"The Beginning"	1:05
2.	"Before You"	3:44
3.	"Down in History"	4:20
4.	"I Am Always Going to Love You"	3:30
5.	"Don't Mess With My Girl"	3:26
6.	"I Want You Anyway"	3:52
7.	"Thank God"	3:50
8.	"More Than Me"	3:40
9.	"You and I"	2:57
10.	"Let Go"	4:36
11.	"Walk Away"	6:46

== Chart performance ==
=== Charts ===
Like Us	Peak	Sales
U.S. Billboard Top Rock Albums	45	TBA
