= Holding My Breath =

Studio album by Jon McLaughlin
- Released: September 24, 2013
- Recorded: 2013
- Genre: Piano pop, pop rock
- Length: 53:36
- Label: Razor & Tie
- Producer: Jon McLaughlin

Jon McLaughlin chronology
Forever If Ever (2011); Promising Promises (2012)	Holding My Breath (2013)	Like Us (2015)

Holding My Breath is the fourth full-length studio album by American singer-songwriter Jon McLaughlin. The album was released on September 24, 2013 in the United States. In July 2013, McLaughlin launched a campaign with PledgeMusic, allowing listeners to be involved actively with the making of the album, even releasing the track "Hallelujah" early to pledgers as an incentive on September 7, 2013.

== Track listing ==
As confirmed by Amazon.com.

No.	Title	Length
1.	"Above the Radio"	4:44
2.	"Hallelujah"	5:14
3.	"Doesn't Mean Goodbye"	3:47
4.	"Anybody Else"	5:33
5.	"Oh, Jesus"	3:32
6.	"Broken Hearted"	5:08
7.	"Fire Away"	4:33
8.	"Oh!"	3:55
9.	"Imaginary Tea"	4:22
10.	"The Truth"	4:42
11.	"Throw It on the Fire"	5:59
12.	"At Night"	2:07
Total length:		53:36

== Charts ==
Chart performance for Holding My Breath
Chart (2013)	Peak position
US Billboard 200	141
US Top Christian Albums (Billboard)	8
