= Jon McLaughlin (musician) =

American singer-songwriter

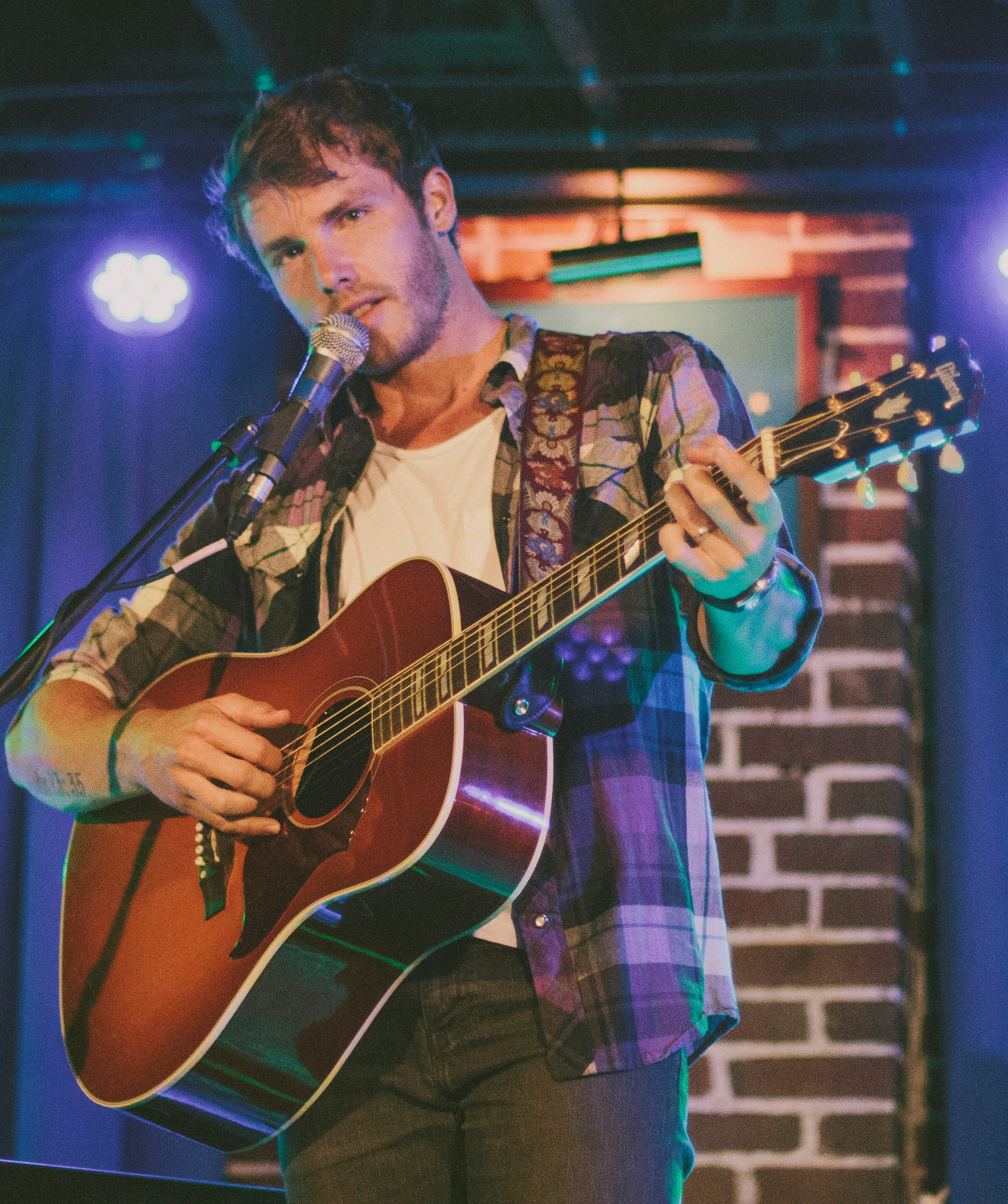
- McLaughlin performing at Duck Room on Blueberry Hill in 2013

Background information
- Born: Jonathan McLaughlin; September 27, 1982 (age 43)
- Origin: Anderson, Indiana, U.S.
- Genres: Pop; CCM; pop rock
- Occupations: Singer-songwriter, guitarist, pianist, record producer
- Instruments: Piano, guitar, vocals
- Years active: 2003–present
- Labels: Def Jam, Razor & Tie
- Website: www.jonmcl.com

Jonathan McLaughlin (born September 27, 1982) is an American pop rock singer-songwriter, record producer and pianist from Anderson, Indiana. His debut album Indiana was released on May 1, 2007, preceded by his first EP Industry, also known as Jon McL, in February 2007. His most successful song is the 2008 single "Beating My Heart", from his second album OK Now.

== Early life ==
McLaughlin grew up in Anderson, Indiana, playing piano since early childhood, though he disliked the lessons, and often sought to avoid them. While attending Highland High School, McLaughlin shattered both wrists in an accident that interrupted his musical career. Rediscovering "his muse," McLaughlin attended Anderson University to study music.

== Career ==
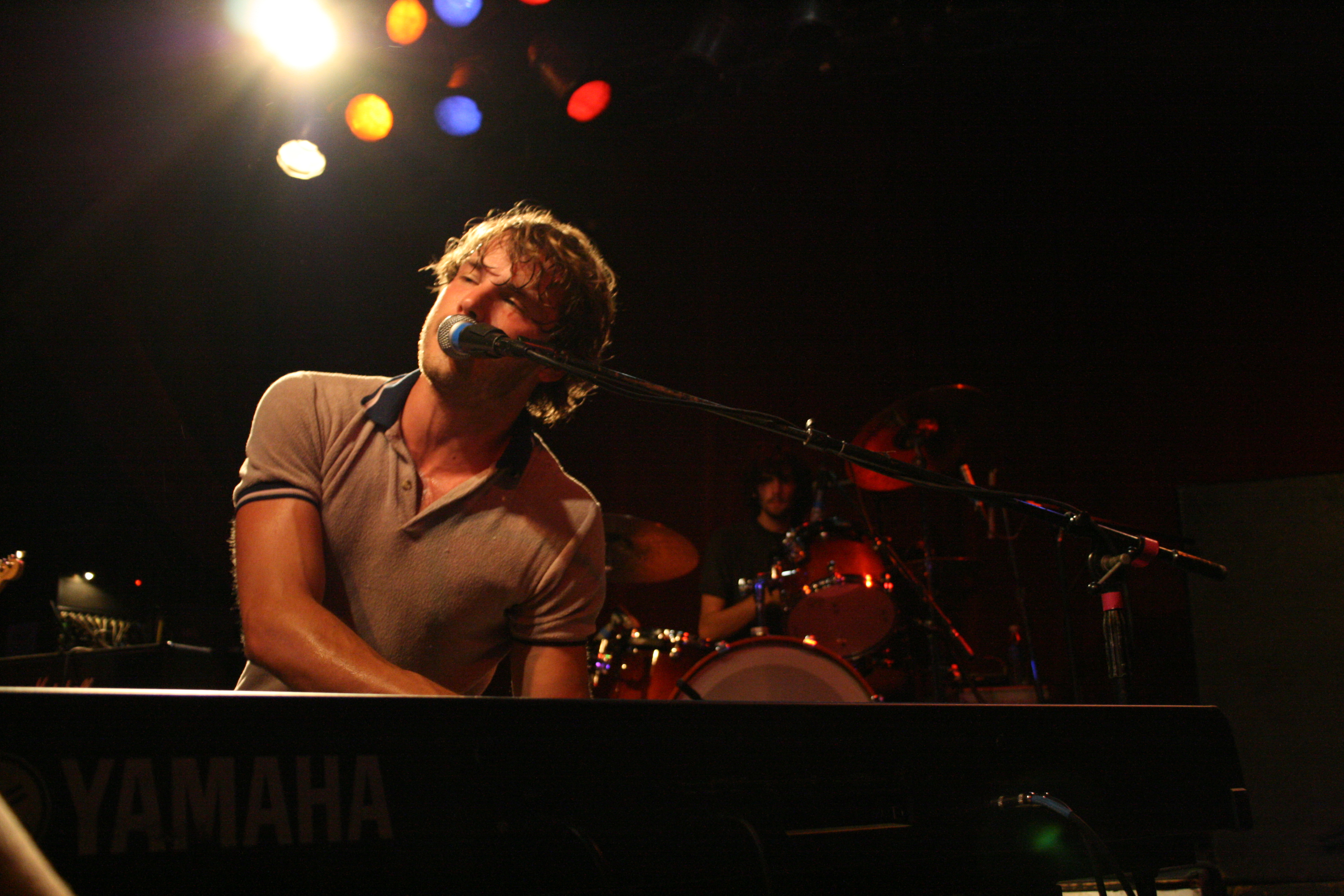
McLaughlin performing on Nashville, Tennessee in 2007

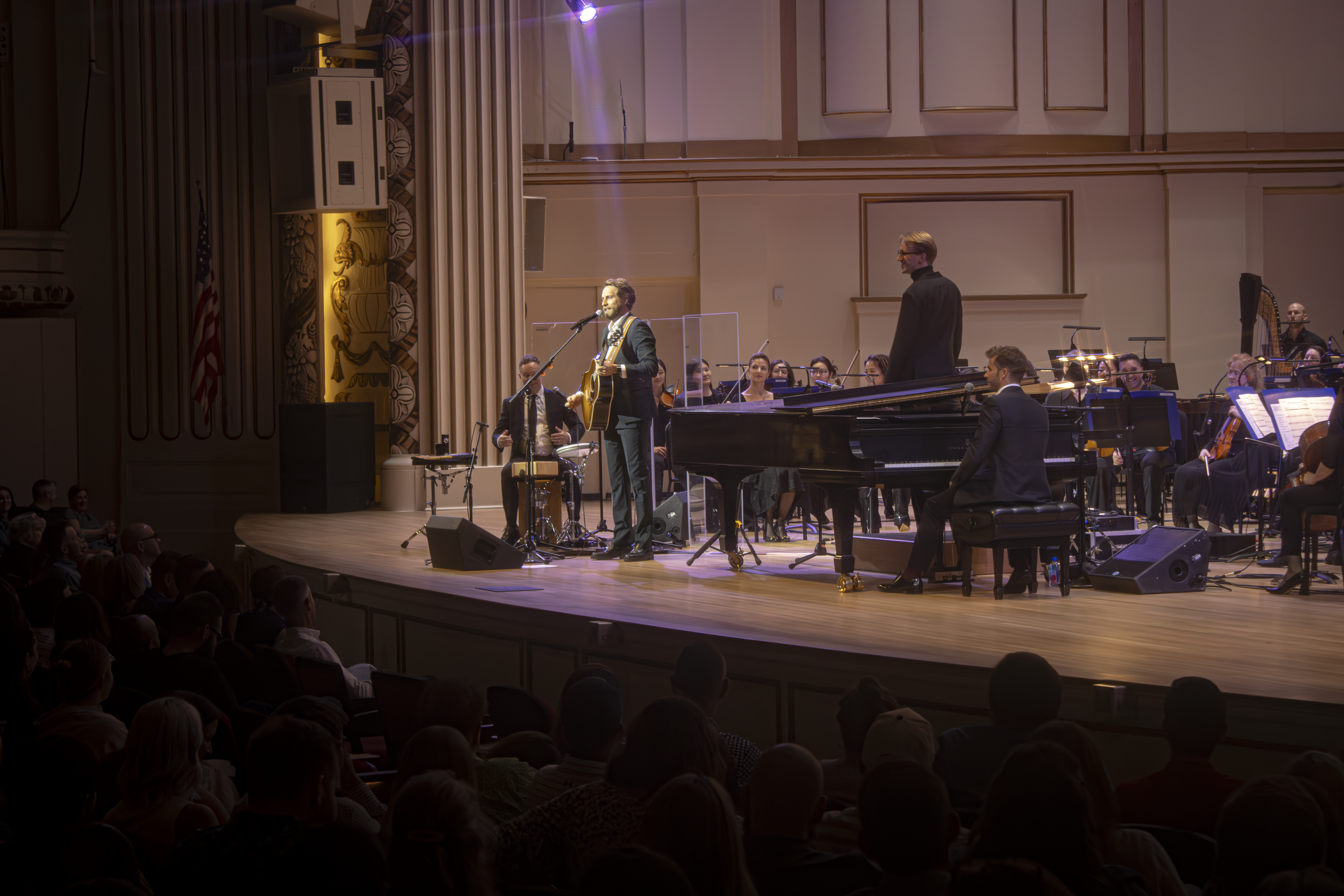
McLaughlin (seated at piano) performing with Ben Rector (center) for the Symphonies Across America Tour in 2026

In 2005, McLaughlin recorded an 8-song EP, Songs I Wrote and Later Recorded. Touring expanded to across the country as support continued to grow for the independent artist. He also increased his fan base by playing at Timber Wolf Lake, a Young Life camp, with his first album entitled Jon McLaughlin. He caught the attention of other independent artists and began touring with artists such as Dave Barnes and Matt Wertz.

In 2005, he signed with record label Island Records. Since then, McLaughlin increased his presence at well-established musical venues and festivals such as Feeling Better Than Everfine (Cleveland, OH), Waterfest (Oshkosh, WI), Milwaukee Summerfest (Milwaukee, WI), Northwest State College Fest (Archbold, OH) and Lollapalooza (Chicago, IL). He has toured with Kelly Clarkson, Adele, O.A.R., Sister Hazel, Cowboy Mouth, Paolo Nutini, and Marc Broussard.

=== Major label debut ===
After signing with Island Records, McLaughlin increased his public image by providing music for the NBC comedy Scrubs, episode "My Conventional Wisdom," on May 10, 2007. McLaughlin's song, "Human" was included in the episode. The same song appeared at the end of the episode "The Walk-In" of Ghost Whisperer. "Beautiful Disaster" can also be heard in the TV series A Little Thing Called Life in the season two episode titled "The Greatest and Worst Halloween Ever." "Beautiful Disaster" sold over 420,000 digital copies.

To date, three Hollywood-released films have included songs from McLaughlin. The song "Another Layer" appeared on the soundtrack for the motion picture Bridge to Terabithia and "Beautiful Disaster" is used in the 2007 film Georgia Rule. McLaughlin also made an on-screen appearance and performance of the song, "So Close" (written by Alan Menken and Stephen Schwartz) in the Oscar-nominated Disney film Enchanted.

The song received an Oscar nomination. This led to McLaughlin performing at the 80th Academy Awards, which he attended with his wife Amy.

=== Rising fame, collaborations, Academy Awards ===
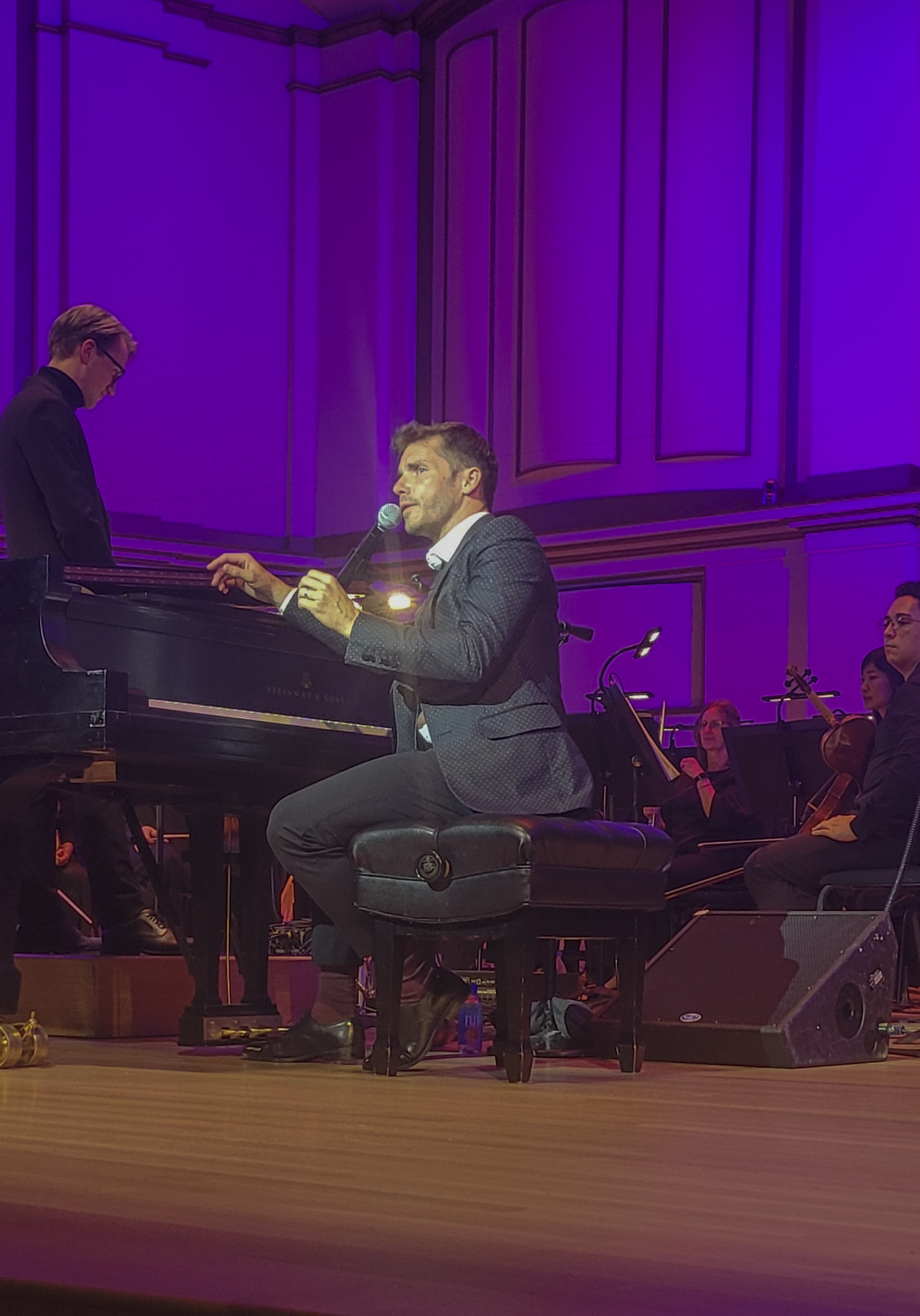
McLaughlin performing in 2026

McLaughlin opened on Kelly Clarkson's My December Tour beginning in October 2007, a role announced on The Tonight Show with Jay Leno on August 7, 2007. He has also toured extensively with similarly styled and popular singer-songwriter, Sara Bareilles.

He recorded a trio with Jason Mraz and Van Hunt for the Randy Jackson duets-album Randy Jackson's Music Club, Vol. 1. The track title is "Something to Believe In". McLaughlin's "Human" is also heard in TV Promos for CBS series' Flashpoint.

In 2007, McLaughlin appeared as himself in the film Enchanted starring Amy Adams and Patrick Dempsey singing "So Close", which led to a performance at the 2008 Academy Awards. In 2010, the song was used in Disney California Adventure's World of Color show.

McLaughlin's version of "Smack Into You", written and produced by The-Dream and Tricky Stewart, was leaked to the internet in 2008, but did not appear on OK Now. Beyoncé eventually covered the song and it was featured on her album I Am... Sasha Fierce, re-titled as "Smash Into You".

In June 2008, McLaughlin premiered "Beating My Heart", which was released to mainstream radio on July 22, 2008, prior to being sent to Hot Adult Contemporary (Hot AC) on June 10. "Beating My Heart", first single from his second studio album OK Now, is available with the rest of the album for download on iTunes and Amazon. The song was praised by Billboard single reviews editor Chuck Taylor, who wrote that "It's high time for singer/songwriter Jon McLaughlin to earn his due." He followed this with a description of the song as "a joyous uptempo romantic romp, featuring hook after hook, from tinkling piano to driving percussion and a start-and-stop bridge, alongside a joyous effortless vocal that soars with falsetto to the high heavens. The accompanying video is simple enough, but effectively illustrates McLaughlin's charms as a palatable sex symbol. "Heart" pumps with instantaneous hit potential, and proper promotion of it could propel the artist to superstar status."

McLaughlin co-wrote "Every Time You Lie" and "Falling Over Me" with Demi Lovato for Lovato's second album Here We Go Again in 2009. The latter was originally a duet, but the final version only featured McLaughlin's backing vocals.

=== Label changes, independent, and new ventures ===
McLaughlin self-financed and released his third studio album, Forever If Ever, on September 6, 2011. He later signed to record label Razor & Tie and re-released the album as Promising Promises on May 22, 2012, remastering all the tracks and adding three new songs. The first single from the album, "Summer is Over," featured Sara Bareilles and was released on January 10, 2012.

In July 2013, McLaughlin launched a campaign with PledgeMusic, allowing listeners to actively be involved with the making of his new album. The album, Holding My Breath, was released on September 24, 2013, and debuted at No. 26 on the Billboard Independent Albums and No. 141 Billboard 200 charts. It was preceded by the singles "Hallelujah" and "Doesn't Mean Goodbye."

Additionally, he released a set of short films on his YouTube channel ahead of the album's release.

On February 15, 2014, McLaughlin was the opening act for Billy Joel at The Palace of Auburn Hills, (Auburn Hills, Michigan) in addition to the Air Canada Centre in Toronto, Canada stop on March 9, 2014.

In 2015, he announced a new album Like Us with the premiere of his single "Before You" in July. A follow-up single "I Want You Anyway" was released in September. The album Like Us was released on October 9, 2015.

In 2017, he opened for Scott Bradlee's Postmodern Jukebox and Straight No Chaser's "Double Feature" Tour. He also began a new Patreon series called "Dueling Pianos." The following year, he announced a new single "Lost" which preceded his next album Angst & Grace which was released on November 9, 2018.

== Personal life ==
McLaughlin and his wife, Amy, have two daughters.

== Discography ==
=== Studio albums ===
Title	Album details	Peak chart positions			
Title	Album details	US	US Christ	US Rock	US Indep.
Indiana	Release date: May 1, 2007; Label: Island Def Jam Music Group; Formats: CD, digital download	81	5	25	—
OK Now	Release date: October 7, 2008; Label: Island Def Jam Music Group; Formats: CD, digital download	49	2	18	—
Forever If Ever	Release date: September 6, 2011; Label: Self-released; Formats: CD, digital download	84	3	12	10
Promising Promises	Release date: May 22, 2012; Label: Razor & Tie; Formats: CD, digital download	113	—	—	—
Holding My Breath	Release date: September 24, 2013; Label: Razor & Tie; Formats: CD, digital download	141	8	—	26
Like Us	Release date: October 9, 2015; Label: Razor & Tie; Formats: CD, digital download, Vinyl	—	—	45	—
Angst & Grace	Release date: November 9, 2018; Label: Jon McLaughlin; Formats: CD, digital download	—	—	—	—
All The Things I Say To Myself	Release date: November 19, 2021; Label: Jon McLaughlin; Formats: CD, digital download	—	—	—	—
Scenarios	Release date: October 24, 2025; Label: Jon McLaughlin; Formats: CD, digital download	—	—	—	—

=== Independent albums ===
Title	Album details
Up Until Now	Release date: 2003; Label: Self-released
Jon McLaughlin (The Early Recordings)	Release date: 2004; Label: Orangehaus Records
Songs I Wrote and Later Recorded	Release date: 2005; Label: Self-released

=== Extended plays ===
Title	Album details
Industry	Release date: February 20, 2007; Label: Island Def Jam Music Group; Formats: Digital download
Exclusive B-Sides (3 Song Bundle)	Release date: March 7, 2013; Label: Self-released; Formats: Digital download
Holding My Breath EP – (String Version)	Release date: November 12, 2013; Label: Razor & Tie; Formats: Digital download
The Christmas EP	Release date: November 11, 2014; Label: Self-released; Formats: CD, Digital download
Red and Green EP	Release date: November 17, 2017; Label: Self-released; Formats: CD, Digital download
Mood II - EP	Release date: May 8, 2020; Label: Self-released; Formats: CD, Digital download
Things I Say To Myself	Release date: August 28, 2020; Label: Self-released; Formats: CD, Digital download
Christmas Time EP	Release date: November 13, 2020; Label: Self-released; Formats: CD, Digital download

=== Singles ===
Year	Title	Peak chart positions			Album
Year	Title	US Adult	US Christ	US Rock Digital	Album
2007	"Industry"	—	—	—	Industry / Indiana
2007	"Beautiful Disaster"	28	—	—	Indiana
2007	"Human"	—	—	—	Indiana
2007	"So Close"	—	—	—	Enchanted soundtrack
2008	"Beating My Heart"	18	27	—	OK Now
2010	"Merry, Merry Christmas Everyone"	—	—	—	Non-album singles
2011	"What I Want"	—	—	—	Forever If Ever
2012	"Summer Is Over" (with Sara Bareilles)	—	—	32	Promising Promises
2014	"Honest-to-Goodness Indiana"	—	—	—	Non-album singles
2013	"Hallelujah"	—	—	—	Holding My Breath
2013	"Doesn't Mean Goodbye"	—	—	—	Holding My Breath
2015	"Before You"	—	—	—	Like Us
2015	"I Want You Anyway"	—	—	—	Like Us
2016	"Beautiful Lies"	—	—	—	Non-album singles
2018	"Lost"	—	—	—	Angst & Grace
2018	"You Don't Talk About Me"	—	—	—	Angst & Grace
2019	"So Emotional"	—	—	—	Non-album singles
2020	"Hiding"	—	—	—	Mood II - EP
2020	"Believing"	—	—	—	Mood II - EP
2020	"A Break Up Song"	—	—	—	Things I Say To Myself EP
2020	"Outta My Head"	—	—	—	Things I Say To Myself EP
2020	"Feeling Like Christmas"	—	—	—	Christmas Time EP
2021	"In & Out" (with Casey McQuillen)	—	—	—	Non-album singles
2021	"Why It Hurts"	—	—	—	All The Things I Say To Myself

=== Other charted songs ===
Year	Title	Peak chart positions		Album
Year	Title	US Christ Digital	US Rock Digital	Album
2012	"Maybe It's Over"	4	49	Promising Promises

=== Soundtrack ===
Year	Title	Song	Notes
2007	Bridge to Terabithia	"Another Layer"	
2007	Ghost Whisperer	"Human"	Episodes: "Dead to Rights" & "The Walk-in"
2007	Scrubs	"Human"	Episode: "My Conventional Wisdom"
2007	Georgia Rule	"Beautiful Disaster"	
2007	The Bold and the Beautiful	"Beautiful Disaster"	Episode: #1.5132
2007	Enchanted	"So Close"	
2008	Army Wives	"Beautiful Disaster"	Episode: "All in the Family"
2009	CSI: NY	"Always On My Mind"	Episode: "Help"
2012	90210	"Always On My Mind"	Episode: "Forever Hold Your Peace"
2012	A Thousand Words	"We All Need Saving"	
2015	Madam Secretary	"We All Need Saving"	Episode: "Tamerlane"
2014	Reckless	"Hymm for Her"	Episode: "I'll Follow You"
2015	Nashville	"Hymm for Her"	Episode: "Can't Let Go"

== Filmography ==
Year	Title	Role	Notes
2007	Enchanted	Ballroom Singer	
2012	Atlantians in America	Big W Foot	Direct-to-video
2013	My Life in Real Time		Short
