= The Making of Me (TV series) =

- Narrated by: Tracy-Ann Oberman
- Composer: Sheridan Tongue
- Country of origin: United Kingdom
- Original language: English
- No. of series: 1
- No. of episodes: 3

Production
- Executive producer: Danielle Peck
- Producer: John Holdsworth
- Editor: Lauri White
- Running time: 60 minutes

Original release
- Network: BBC One
- Release: 24 July – 7 August 2008

The Making of Me is a 60-minute miniseries on the BBC on BBC One, the first season was in 2008. As of 7 August 2008, there have been three episodes.

== Episode list ==
1. John Barrowman - John Barrowman challenges scientists to explain why he is gay. (24 July 2008)
2. Colin Jackson - Athlete Colin Jackson and scientists try to discover the secrets of his talents. (31 July 2008)
3. Vanessa-Mae - Violinist Vanessa-Mae asks if science can explain the secret of her success. (7 August 2008)
