= Superstar Dogs: Countdown to Crufts =

2014 game show hosted by John Barrowman

- Genre: Animals
- Presented by: John Barrowman
- Starring: John Leslie (trainer); Dave Ray (referee)
- Voices of: Jim Rosenthal
- Country of origin: United Kingdom
- Original language: English
- No. of series: 1
- No. of episodes: 15

Production
- Production location: Dock10 studios
- Running time: 30 minutes (inc. adverts)
- Production company: Tuesday's Child

Original release
- Network: Channel 4
- Release: 17 February – 6 March 2014

Superstar Dogs: Countdown to Crufts is a game show that aired on Channel 4 from 17 February to 6 March 2014 and was hosted by John Barrowman.
