= Hollow Earth (novel) =

2012 novel by John and Carole Barrowman

- Cover of Hollow Earth
- Author: John and Carole Barrowman
- Language: English
- Genre: Young Adult/Fantasy
- Publisher: Buster Books
- Publication date: 2 February 2012
- Publication place: United Kingdom
- Media type: Print (paperback)
- Pages: 336
- ISBN: 1-907151-64-8
- Followed by: Bone Quill

Hollow Earth is the debut novel from sibling writing pair John Barrowman and Carole Barrowman which was published in the United Kingdom on 2 February 2012 by Buster Books.

== Plot ==
The novel is about twins Matt and Emily ("Em") Calder who share an ability that allows them to make artwork come to life, due to their powerful imaginations. Their ability is sought after by antagonists who wish to use it in order to breach Hollow Earth—a realm in which all demons and monsters are trapped.

== Inspirations ==
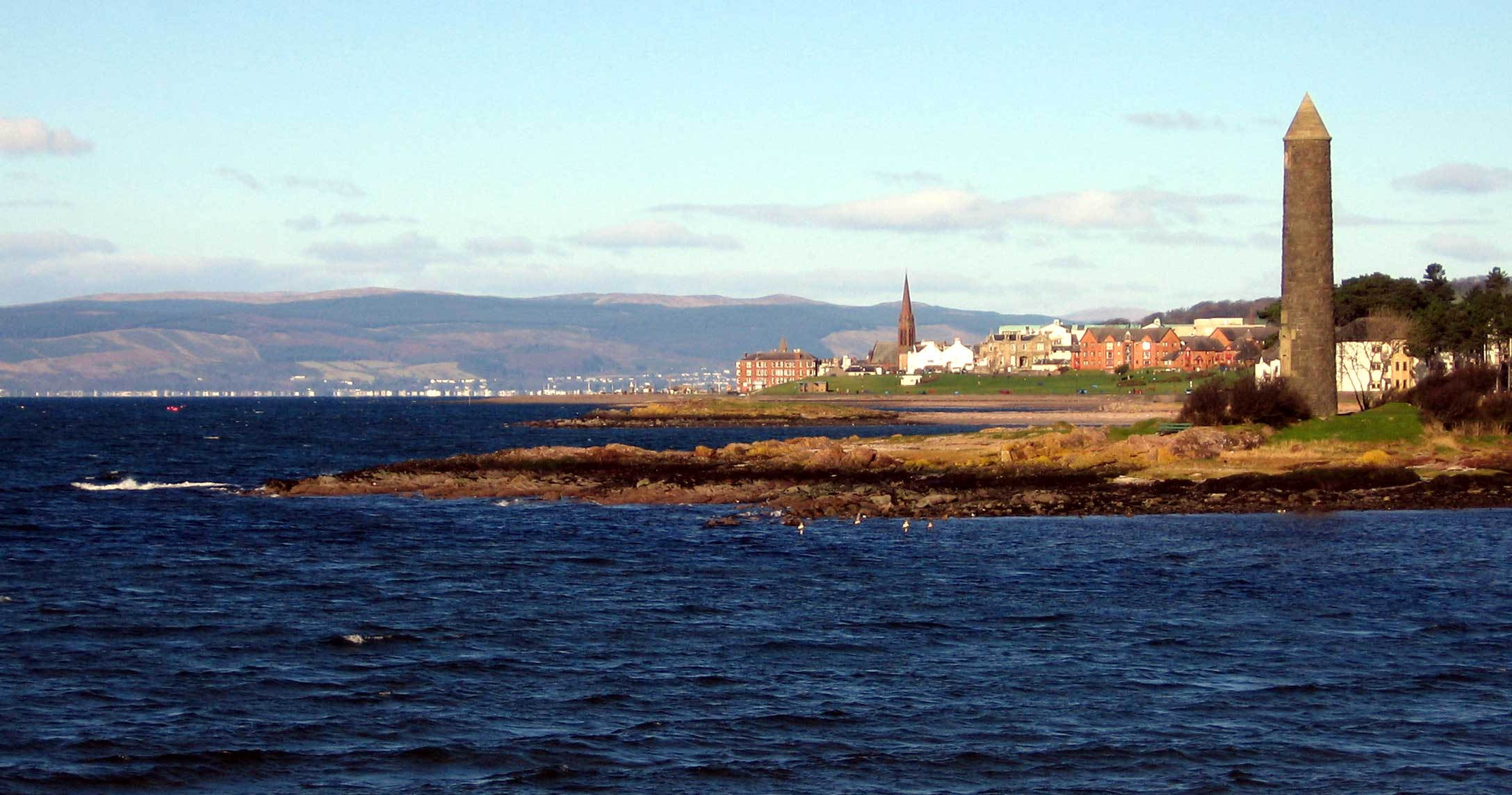
The "Pencil" monument commemorating the Battle of Largs, which stands just over 1 mile (1.6 km) south of the town centre.

Part of the novel is set on the fictitious island of Auchinmurn, which is inspired by the islands of Great Cumbrae and Little Cumbrae off the coast of Largs. The name Auchinmurn is a tribute to Carole and John's maternal grandmother Murn Butler. Other locations which feature in the novel include Glasgow's Kelvingrove Art Gallery and Museum and the "Pencil" Monument near Largs.

Since Art and artwork is an important theme in the novel, many of the paintings mentioned are based on or inspired by real-life works of art from artists such as Georges Seurat, William Blake, Vincent van Gogh, Henry Fuseli and Salvador Dalí.

The name of the female protagonist 'Emily' was chosen for being the middle name of author Carole Barrowman and also the Christian name of the Barrowmans' paternal Grandmother, Emily Barrowman. The name of male protagonist, 'Matt', was chosen because it is John Barrowman's favourite male Christian name.

== Reception ==
The book has been described by Sarah Swain of The Herald as a Scottish-style version of Harry Potter. Charles Kelly, writing for local news site S1Millport.com describes the book as a "brilliant read" which he devoured in one sitting, and expresses hope that the release of the book will increase tourism potential for the island.
