= Indiana (Jon McLaughlin album) =

Studio album by Jon McLaughlin
- Released: May 1, 2007
- Recorded: 2006–07
- Genre: Pop rock
- Length: 55:49
- Label: Island Def Jam
- Producers: Jamie Houston; Greg Wells

Jon McLaughlin chronology
Industry (2007)	Indiana (2007)	OK Now (2008)

Singles from Indiana
- 1. "Beautiful Disaster" Released: April 2007; 2. "Proud Father" Released: June 19, 2007

Indiana is the debut studio album by American singer and songwriter Jon McLaughlin. It was released on May 1, 2007, through The Island Def Jam Music Group. The album is a continuation of McLaughlin's extended play (EP), Industry (2007).

== Singles ==
The lead single from the album, "Beautiful Disaster", was released in April 2007. The song peaked at number 28 on the Billboard Adult Top 40 chart.

"Proud Father" was released digitally as the second single from the album on July 19, 2007.

== Critical reception ==
Professional ratings
Review scores
Source	Rating
AllMusic	3/5 stars
Christianity Today	4/5 stars
JesusFreakHideout	4/5 stars

Russ Breimeier of Christianity Today stated "Things are off to a strong start for 24-year-old singer/songwriter Jon McLaughlin from Anderson, Indiana. After opening for the likes of O.A.R., Live, and Marc Broussard, his debut album (named for his home state) released to the mainstream last May. Much like his friend and tour mate Matt Wertz, McLaughlin offers subtle expressions of faith, but they still inform his broad spectrum of songwriting. All of this is delivered with impressive piano pop reminiscent of Ben Folds and Gabe Dixon crossed with Scott Krippayne and Mark Schultz—the piano runs in 'People' and 'Industry' would impress even Bruce Hornsby. It's a nice alternative to all the Jack Johnson and John Mayer copycats out there. Though some of the pop songs are as predictable as average Christian adult contemporary, the strong production values by Greg Wells (Rufus Wainwright, Natasha Bedingfield) and Jamie Houston (Jessica Simpson, Macy Gray) helps elevate it. McLaughlin's considerable skills shine, enough so to make you glad that he's using his talents to reach a broader audience." JesusFreakHideout's Jessica Gregorious claimed "The debut from this Indiana-bred singer and songwriter is proof that he finished at the top of his class at Anderson University. A musician with this much talent needs not go unnoticed. Indiana is, if anything, a fresh take on a fairly overplayed genre. It was easy to fully expect another pop record with the same old thing we hear over and over, but this album offers much more than your typical ballads on love and life. Indiana is one everyone can relate to, young or old. If you were going to invest in a pop/rock record this year, look no further. Not only does Jon McLaughlin offer up piano-playing talent on a silver platter, he offers an acceptable and more artistic alternative to the likes of Gavin DeGraw and Josh Kelley." AllMusic said "Not to be confused with the innovative jazz guitarist of the same (differently spelled) name, Jon McLaughlin is a young singer-songwriter with a knack for catchy pop songs and earnest sentiments. McLaughlin's debut album Indiana, named after his home state, is packed with tunes that tackle love, loss, family, and friends with all the honesty and ardor of a young troubadour setting out to make his mark with nothing but a piano and some great pop hooks. Indiana is a promising first effort from an artist who should appeal to both pop aficionados and singer-songwriter fans."

== Track listing ==
Standard edition
No.	Title	Writer(s)	Length
1.	"Industry"	Jon McLaughlin	3:59
2.	"Beautiful Disaster"	Jamie Houston; McLaughlin	4:11
3.	"Just Give It Time"	Matthew Gerrard; McLaughlin; Robbie Nevil	3:45
4.	"Already In"	McLaughlin	3:54
5.	"For You from Me"	Lauren Christy; Graham Edwards; McLaughlin; Scott Spock	3:34
6.	"Human"	Kevin Griffin; McLaughlin	4:12
7.	"Indiana"	McLaughlin	3:48
8.	"Anthem for American Teenagers"	McLaughlin	5:53
9.	"People"	McLaughlin	3:46
10.	"Amelia's Missing"	Marcus Hummon; McLaughlin	2:48
11.	"Praying to the Wrong God"	Houston; McLaughlin	4:07
12.	"Perfect"	McLaughlin	4:22
13.	"Until You Got Love"	James Dean Hicks; Houston; McLaughlin	3:56

Christian retail edition
No.	Title	Writer(s)	Length
1.	"Industry"	McLaughlin	3:59
2.	"Beautiful Disaster"	Houston; McLaughlin	4:11
3.	"Just Give It Time"	Gerrard; McLaughlin; Nevil	3:45
4.	"Already In"	McLaughlin	3:54
5.	"For You from Me"	Christy; Edwards; McLaughlin; Spock	3:34
6.	"Human"	Griffiths; McLaughlin	4:12
7.	"Indiana"	McLaughlin	3:48
8.	"Anthem for American Teenagers"	McLaughlin	5:53
9.	"People"	McLaughlin	3:46
10.	"Proud Father"	McLaughlin	6:10
11.	"Praying to the Wrong God"	Houston; McLaughlin	4:07
12.	"Perfect"	McLaughlin	4:22
13.	"Until You Got Love"	Hicks; Houston; McLaughlin	3:56

Deluxe edition (15th Anniversary Edition)
No.	Title	Writer(s)	Length
14.	"Proud Father"	McLaughlin	6:10
15.	"Far for Home"	McLaughlin; Gabe Dixon	3:52
16.	"Indiana (Acapella)" (featuring Straight No Chaser)	McLaughlin	3:49

== Charts ==
Chart (2007)	Peak position
US Billboard 200	81
US Top Christian Albums (Billboard)	5
US Digital Albums (Billboard)	6
US Top Rock Albums (Billboard)	25

== Release history ==
Region	Date	Format	Label	Ref.
Australia	April 30, 2007	CD; digital download	Island Def Jam	
United Kingdom	April 30, 2007	CD; digital download	Island Def Jam	
United States	May 1, 2007	CD; digital download	Island Def Jam	
Germany	November 5, 2007	CD; digital download	Island Def Jam	
Various	October 7, 2022	Streaming; digital download	Island Def Jam	
