= OK Now =

Studio album by Jon McLaughlin
- Released: October 7, 2008
- Recorded: 2007–08
- Genre: Pop rock
- Length: 43:30
- Label: Island Def Jam
- Producer: John Fields; Christopher Stewart; Brett James; The-Dream

Jon McLaughlin chronology
Indiana (2007)	OK Now (2008)	The Early Recordings (2010)

Singles from OK Now
- 1. "Beating My Heart" Released: June 17, 2008

OK Now is the second studio album by American singer and songwriter Jon McLaughlin. It was released on October 7, 2008, through The Island Def Jam Music Group.

== Singles ==
The lead and only single from the album, "Beating My Heart", was released on June 17, 2008. The song peaked at number 18 on Billboard's Adult Top 40 chart and at number 27 on Billboard's Hot Christian Songs chart, respectively. The single is McLaughlin's most successful song to date.

== Critical reception ==
Professional ratings
Review scores
Source	Rating
Artistdirect	3.5/5 stars
AllMusic	3.5/5 stars
JesusFreakHideout	4/5 stars

Stephen Erlewine of AllMusic stated "The success of his song for Enchanted painted Jon McLaughlin as a Midwestern James Blunt, a simpering soul who wants nothing more than to bare his soul. To be sure, McLaughlin does a lot of that on his second album — and first since Enchanted — OK Now (it almost seems as if he forgot the 'What' in the title), often scrubbing those tunes so they can slip undetected into anonymous AAA airwaves. Where McLaughlin has strength is when he loosens up and gets into big, bright pop, the kind that ruled the airwaves in the mid-'80s, after new wave synthesized productions and before adult contemporary flattened them. This is certainly due in part to the presence of John Fields, the same producer who's given the Jonas Brothers a lively sheen not too dissimilar to what's heard on OK Now. OK Now is unapologetic mainstream pop that's not heard too much at the tail-end of the 2000s: hooky, oversized colorful tunes that drill into the subconscious almost immediately. All this makes McLaughlin's taste for the mawkish — which surfaces not just on those ballads, but on his plea to featherweight freshmen to just hold on through the 'Four Years' of high school — a bit of a buzzkill, bringing the album down to earth when it should soar. Of course, this is often a problem with mainstream pop albums, but at least the rest of OK Now illustrates that Jon McLaughlin has a greater gift for a big, bright hook than most of his pop singer/songwriter peers." JesusFreakHideout's Logan Leasure claimed "Around the time of his first full-length studio album release last year, no one really knew who Jon McLaughlin was. The winds of change blew quickly though. After a phenomenal and highly acclaimed performance of the song 'So Close' at the 80th Academy Awards, word spread like wildfire and led to the rapid release of his second album OK Now, and if anything's for sure, it's hot like wildfire too. There is one minor negative program note to mention, however. A track that was originally on the album, 'Smack Into You', was unfortunately cut and given to R&B artist Beyoncé, who later retitled it to "Smash Into You" and featured it on her album I Am Sasha Fierce. A low tempo ballad, the song literally defines Jon's entire musical substance and his record label would be smart to release it at some point, as there is no doubt it would be a fan favorite. Taking a risk doesn't always work out. OK Now is an exception to that. The new combination of Jon McLaughlin's original folk/piano rock sound with a new more pop spin heard here comes off as a clear winner and will unquestionably captivate fans until the next time around."

== Track listing ==
Standard edition
No.	Title	Writer(s)	Producer(s)	Length
1.	"Beating My Heart"	Jon McLaughlin	John Fields	3:52
2.	"Four Years"	McLaughlin	Fields	4:16
3.	"You Can Never Go Back"	McLaughlin	Fields	4:00
4.	"Things That You Say"	Brett James; McLaughlin; Troy Verges	Fields	3:12
5.	"The Middle"	McLaughlin	Fields	4:36
6.	"You Are the One I Love"	McLaughlin; Jason Reeves	Fields	3:54
7.	"Always On My Mind"	Alex Band; McLaughlin	Fields	3:17
8.	"Dance Your Life Away"	McLaughlin	Fields	3:01
9.	"Why I'm Talking to You"	McLaughlin	Fields	4:54
10.	"Throw My Love Around"	McLaughlin	Fields	4:32
11.	"We All Need Saving"	McLaughlin	Fields	3:56
Total length:				43:30

iTunes Store bonus track
No.	Title	Length
12.	"Good Enough"	3:22

== Charts ==
Chart (2008)	Peak position
US Billboard 200	49
US Top Christian Albums (Billboard)	2
US Digital Albums (Billboard)	11
US Top Rock Albums (Billboard)	18

== Release history ==
Region	Date	Format	Label	Ref.
United States	October 7, 2008	CD; Digital download	Island Def Jam	
Europe	October 20, 2008	CD; Digital download	Island Def Jam	
Australia	July 23, 2010	CD; Digital download	Island Def Jam	
