= John Barrowman =

Scottish-American actor, author, and singer (born 1967)

John Barrowman MBE
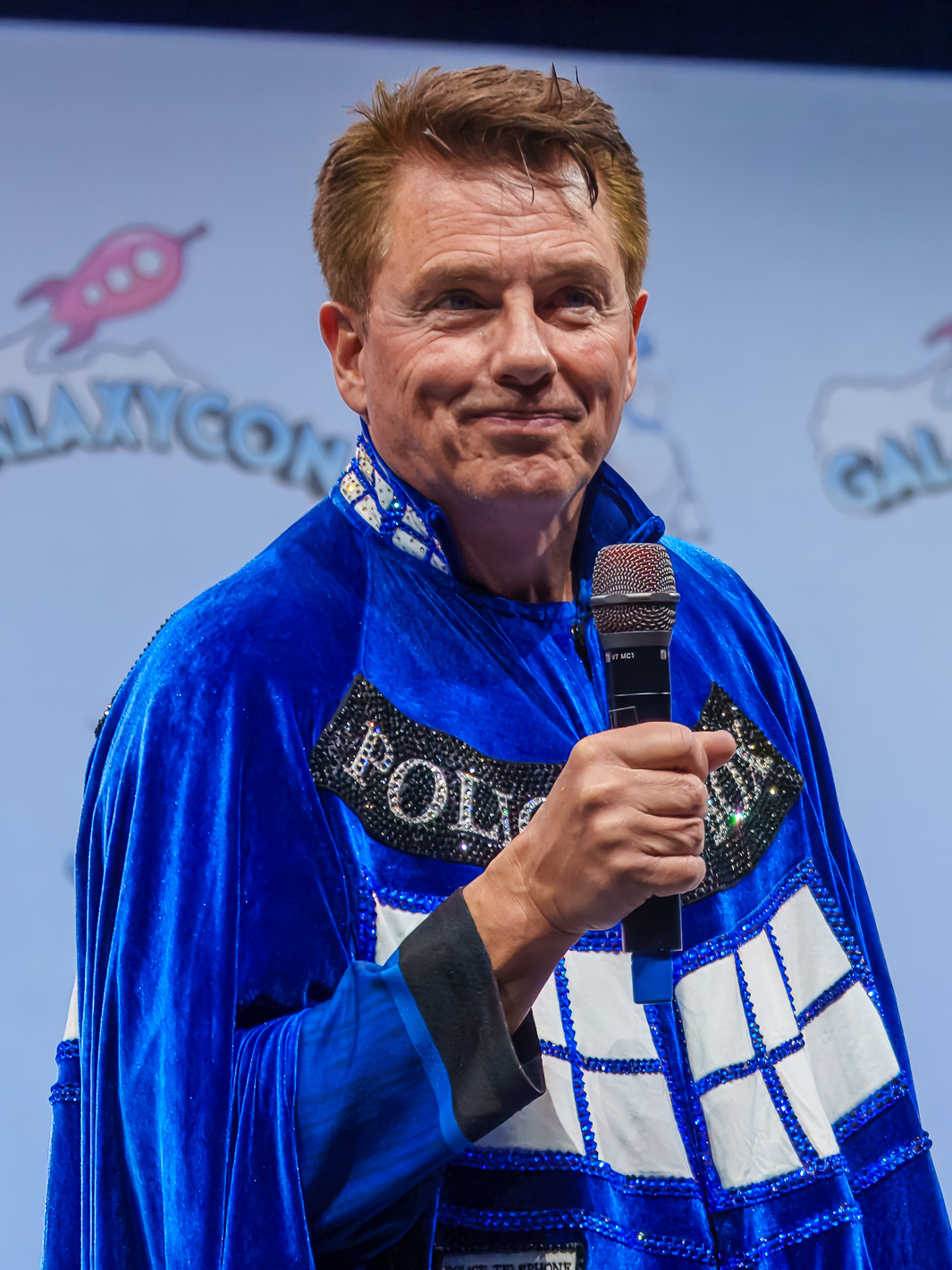
- Barrowman in 2025
- Born: John Scot Barrowman; 11 March 1967 (age 59); Glasgow, Scotland
- Citizenship: United Kingdom; United States
- Occupations: Actor; author; television judge; presenter; singer; comic book writer
- Years active: 1987–present
- Spouse: Scott Gill (m. 2013)
- Relatives: Carole Barrowman (sister)
- Website: johnbarrowman.com

John Scot Barrowman (born 11 March 1967) is a Scottish-American actor, author, presenter, singer and comic book writer. He is known for his roles as Captain Jack Harkness in Doctor Who (2005; 2007–2008; 2010; 2020–2021) and its spin-off Torchwood (2006–2011), and as Malcolm Merlyn in the Arrowverse (2012–2019).

Born in Glasgow, Barrowman moved to the US state of Illinois with his family at the age of eight. Encouraged by his high school teachers there, he studied performing arts at the United States International University in San Diego before landing the role of Billy Crocker in Cole Porter's Anything Goes in London's West End. Since his début, he has played a number of roles in various musicals both in the West End and on Broadway, including Miss Saigon, The Phantom of the Opera, Sunset Boulevard, and Matador. After appearing in Sam Mendes' production of The Fix, he was nominated for the 1998 Laurence Olivier Award for Best Actor in a Musical and, in the early 2000s, returned to the role of Billy Crocker in the revival of Anything Goes. His most recent West End credit was in the 2009 production of La Cage aux Folles.

Alongside his theatrical career, Barrowman has appeared in films such as the musical biopic De-Lovely (2004) and musical comedy The Producers (2005). Before venturing into British television, he featured in the American television dramas Titans and Central Park West, but is better known for his acting and presenting work for the BBC; this includes his work for CBBC in its earlier years, his self-produced entertainment programme Tonight's the Night, and his BAFTA Cymru-nominated role of Captain Jack Harkness in the 2005 revival of the sci-fi series Doctor Who and its spin-off Torchwood. Barrowman has also had a number of guest roles in television programmes both in the US and the UK. He appeared as a contestant on the first series of celebrity ice skating show Dancing on Ice while his theatrical background allowed him to become a judge on Andrew Lloyd Webber's musical talent shows How Do You Solve a Problem like Maria?, Any Dream Will Do and I'd Do Anything. With this experience, he joined the judging panel of Dancing on Ice for the 2020 to 2021 series. In 2006, he was voted Stonewall's Entertainer of the Year. He hosted the BBC One quiz show Pressure Pad in 2013 and 2014. Barrowman starred in The CW's Arrow and Legends of Tomorrow as Malcolm Merlyn.

Barrowman is also featured on many musical theatre recordings, including cover tunes found on his 2007 album Another Side and 2008's Music Music Music. Both albums accrued places on the UK Albums Chart, as did his self-titled John Barrowman (2010), which reached No. 11, his highest chart placing to date. He has published two memoirs and autobiographies, Anything Goes (2008) and I Am What I Am (2009), with his older sister Carole as co-author. The siblings also teamed up to write a series of young-adult fantasy novels, Hollow Earth. The second book in the series, Bone Quill, was released 2013, with the third, Book of Beasts published in 2014. A second trilogy, The Orion Chronicles, followed with Conjuror published in 2016, Nephilim in 2017, and Inquisitor in 2018.

== Early life and education ==
John Scot Barrowman was born in Mount Vernon, Glasgow, on 11 March 1967, the youngest of three children. His older sister, Carole, later became a university professor. He lived in Glasgow for the first eight years of his life. His mother was a singer who also worked in a record shop, while his father was employed by the Caterpillar heavy machinery company in nearby Uddingston. In 1975, his father's company relocated the family to the United States, where his father managed the Caterpillar tractor factory in Aurora, Illinois. The family settled in Joliet, Illinois, where Barrowman attended Joliet West High School in the heart of a "typical middle-class conservative town". His high school music and English teachers changed the future course of his life, with his music tutor instilling in him a love for performing, and his English teacher encouraging him to rise to his true artistic potential. His English teacher moved him into a programme for gifted children and coached him for the school's speech team. With the support of his teacher, he competed with other schools in statewide speech competitions, where he sharpened his skills reading scenes from plays.

After his classmates mocked his native Scottish accent, Barrowman learned to speak with a General American accent, one he says has alternatively been described as a kind of mid-Atlantic accent. As a freshman, he won parts in several musical productions; from 1983 to 1986, he performed in such musical productions as Oliver!, Camelot, Hello, Dolly!, Li'l Abner, and Anything Goes. Among his classmates in high school, who also participated in theater with him, were Anthony Rapp and Andy Dick. Rapp is reportedly a close friend of Barrowman. Barrowman has acknowledged that, without the support he received in high school, he would most likely "not now be appearing in royal command performances in the West End in front of the Royal family or having Stephen Sondheim ask [him] to play opposite Carol Burnett". Barrowman spent his senior year shovelling coal for an Illinois power company. His father had arranged the job (and similar jobs for his brother and sister) to give him the experience of manual labour. His father told him, "If you want to do manual labour for the rest of your life, you'll know that when you do it; it's a choice. But if you don't like it, you'll understand the importance of educating yourself and–if you decide what you want to do–being good at your craft or your skill." Barrowman worked for the power company for the entire summer, but did not like the job. Eventually, he convinced the company to move him to work in the storeroom.

Barrowman graduated from high school in 1985, and he later became a naturalised U.S. citizen while retaining his British citizenship. After he graduated from high school, he attended the University of Iowa for a semester to study drama and music. He then attended DePaul University, studying voice for a semester, before performing at the Opryland theme park in Nashville, Tennessee for two summer seasons. He then transferred to the United States International University in January 1988, where he studied performing arts. As part of a student exchange programme, he returned to the UK in the summer of 1989 to study Shakespeare for six months, but did not return to the USA

== Acting career ==
=== Theatre ===
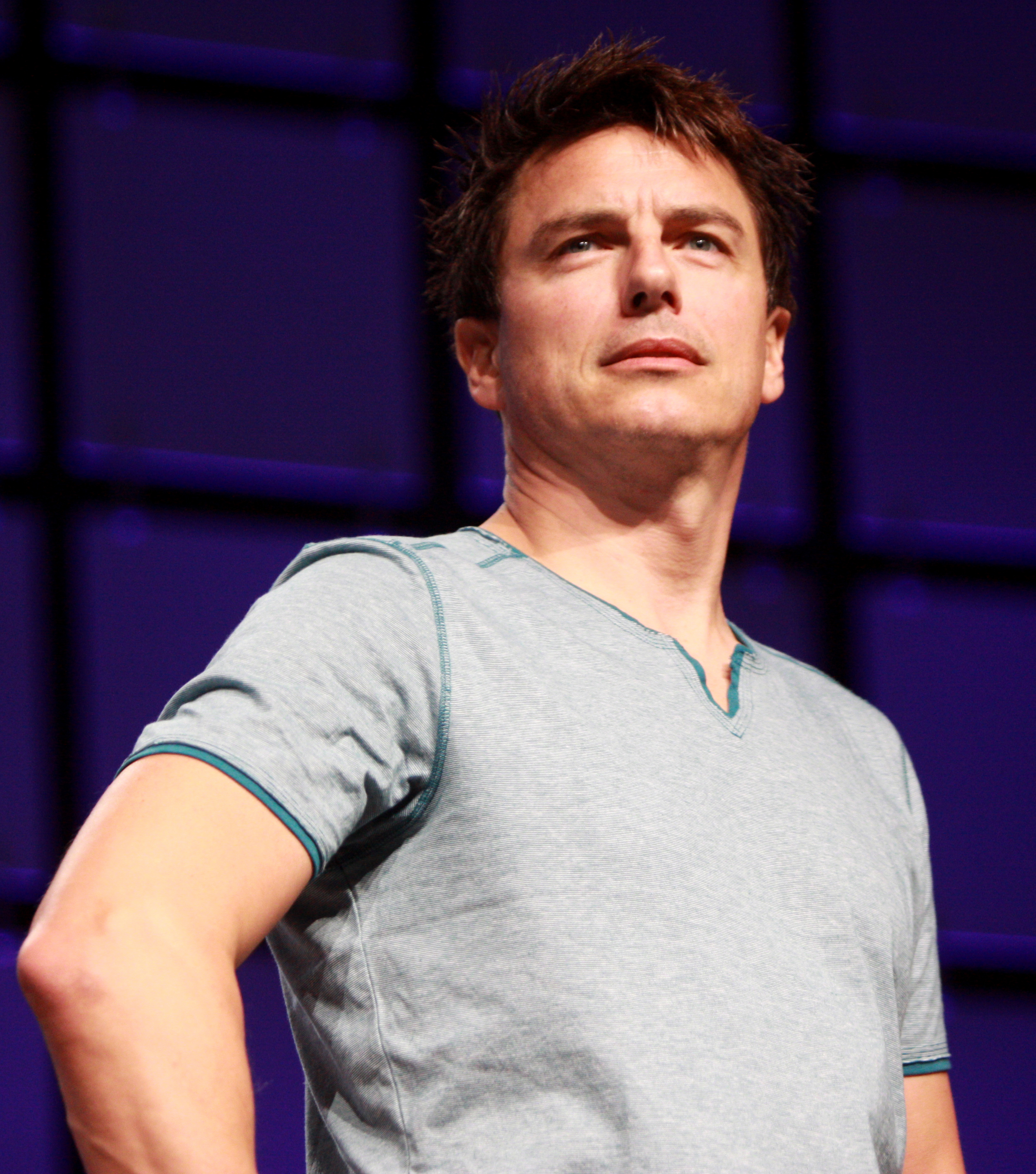
Barrowman at the 2013 Phoenix Comicon

Barrowman's professional acting career began in London's West End in October 1989, playing the role of Billy Crocker in Cole Porter's Anything Goes at the Prince Edward Theatre, alongside Elaine Paige as Reno Sweeney and Bernard Cribbins as Moonface Martin. He continued to appear in West End productions for the next decade, taking the title role of Domingo Hernandez in Matador at the Queen's Theatre in 1991; as Raoul in The Phantom of the Opera at Her Majesty's Theatre in 1992; as Claude in Hair at The Old Vic Theatre in 1993; as Chris in Miss Saigon at the Theatre Royal, Drury Lane in 1993; as Joe Gillis in Sunset Boulevard at the Adelphi Theatre from 1994 to 1995; and as Beast in Beauty and the Beast at the Dominion Theatre in 1999.

Barrowman was part of the musical Godspell in 1994, and was a soloist in two songs, "We Beseech Thee" and "On The Willows". He was lead vocalist on a rendition of Strike Up the Band in Who Could Ask for Anything More? A Celebration of Ira Gershwin at the Royal Albert Hall in 1996, and he was nominated for an Olivier Award for Best Actor in a Musical in 1998 for originating the role of Cal Chandler in The Fix, a performance he repeated in Cameron Mackintosh's 1998 gala concert Hey, Mr Producer!. Barrowman played Joe Gillis in Sunset Boulevard in the West End and, briefly, on Broadway. His only other Broadway credit is in the role of Barry in the Stephen Sondheim revue Putting It Together (1999–2000) at the Ethel Barrymore Theatre opposite Carol Burnett and George Hearn. In a review of Putting It Together, theatre critic Tom Samiljan noted Barrowman's "fine baritone voice and suave looks". In 2002, Barrowman appeared as Bobby in Sondheim's Company in the Kennedy Center's Stephen Sondheim Celebration.

On 23 March 2002, Barrowman took part in the 'Concert for Peace' along with 200 other performers in a gala show at Theatre Royal, Drury Lane, to express their opposition to the US-led war against Iraq. Barrowman sang 'Being Alive' from 'Company'. Other performers that night were David Tennant, Sir Ian McKellen and Dame Judi Dench.

Barrowman returned to the role of Billy Crocker in Trevor Nunn's 2003 West End revival of Anything Goes, and appeared in West End non-musical dramas, such as his role as Wyndham Brandon in Rope at the Minerva Theatre, Chichester in 1993, and he starred as Lieutenant Jack Ross opposite Rob Lowe in the 2005 production of A Few Good Men.

Barrowman starred in pantomime productions of Cinderella at the New Wimbledon Theatre (Christmas, 2005–06) and in Jack and the Beanstalk at Cardiff's New Theatre (Christmas, 2006–07). He played the title role in Aladdin at the Birmingham Hippodrome over Christmas 2007–8 and as a guest act for the Royal Variety Performance at the London Palladium in 2008. Barrowman played the lead in the Robin Hood pantomime at the Birmingham Hippodrome for the 2008–09 season. He presented Andrew Lloyd Webber's 60th birthday party in London's Hyde Park on 14 September 2008. Exactly one year later, Barrowman succeeded Roger Allam as Zaza/Albin in the West End revival of La Cage aux Folles, at the Playhouse Theatre.

=== Television presenter ===
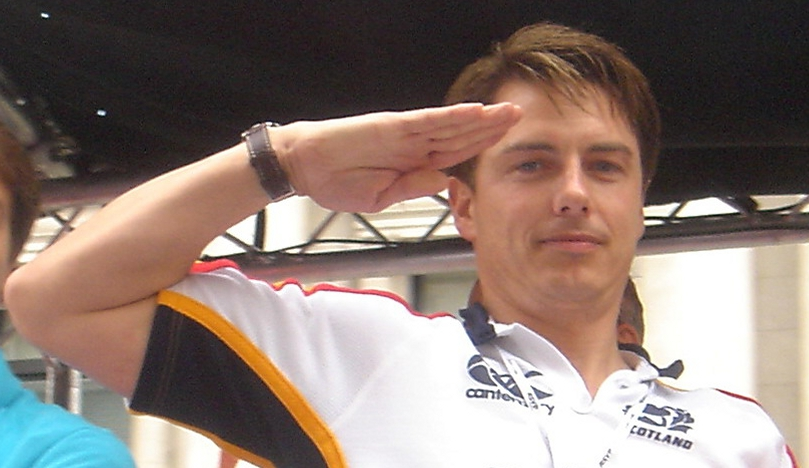
Barrowman saluting in the style of Captain Jack Harkness from a float at the 2007 London Gay Pride parade.

Barrowman was one of the original hosts of Live & Kicking, a children's Saturday morning variety show on the BBC. During this time, he became known for his catchphrase, "it's a dirty rat!", which he used during a phone-in game set in a haunted house. From 1993 to 1994, Barrowman reported on technology news as the host of the Electric Circus segment of the show. He appeared on the children's television game show, The Movie Game from 1994 to 1996, taking over from Jonathon Morris.

Barrowman was one of the regular presenters on Channel 5's afternoon show 5's Company from 1997 to 1999. Barrowman read bedtime stories on the CBeebies channel between 1 and 5 May 2006. That summer, Barrowman was on a Judges panel with Andrew Lloyd Webber, David Ian, and Zoë Tyler on BBC One's music talent show How Do You Solve a Problem like Maria?.

In the same year, Barrowman made two television appearances on New Year's Eve: He talked about spirituality and civil partnerships on BBC Television's Heaven & Earth, hosted by Gloria Hunniford, and he appeared as a guest on Graham Norton's one-off BBC Television programme, The Big Finish, teaming up with Craig Revel Horwood and Louis Walsh to take a lighthearted look at news stories in 2006. On 11 February 2007, Barrowman co-presented coverage of the BAFTA Film Awards, along with Ruby Wax for E!: Entertainment Television. On 11 and 18 February 2007, Barrowman guest-presented two editions of Elaine Paige on Sunday, a pre-recorded BBC Radio 2 weekly musical theatre and film music showcase.

In 2007, Barrowman was a judge on the BBC One TV series Any Dream Will Do, hosted by Graham Norton. The show searched for a new, unknown actor to play the role of Joseph in a West End revival of the Andrew Lloyd Webber musical Joseph and the Amazing Technicolor Dreamcoat, eventually choosing Lee Mead. He guested on the BBC Two comedy panel quiz show Never Mind the Buzzcocks (Series 19, Episode 5), challenging host Simon Amstell to a "gay-off". He also guested on Al Murray's Happy Hour, The Charlotte Church Show, and Friday Night with Jonathan Ross.

On 27 July 2007, Barrowman guest hosted The Friday Night Project, on Channel 4. In 2008 Barrowman presented a primetime BBC game show called The Kids Are All Right. On the show, four adults compete against seven "smart and sassy" children for cash in four rounds "testing their brainpower, knowledge and speed of response". On 16 and 23 February 2008, he presented the National Lottery Draw.

On 1 March 2008, Barrowman appeared as a panellist of the Eurovision Song Contest selection show, Eurovision: Your Decision on BBC One with Carrie Grant and Terry Wogan. From 29 April to 1 May, he presented This Morning. Barrowman began featuring as a judge on the Canadian version of How Do You Solve a Problem Like Maria? in June 2008. In 2008, Barrowman became the presenter for Animals at Work, a children's television show on CBBC that showcases "animals with extraordinary skills that make people's lives easier and safer"; Animals at Work began in 2009 with 26 episodes. In February 2010, Barrowman appeared as a guest host on UK shopping channel QVC

In 2011, Barrowman guest hosted the Christmas special of Never Mind the Buzzcocks (Series 25, Episode 12). In 2012, Barrowman guest presented three episodes of This Morning with Kate Thornton. In July 2012, Barrowman co-hosted the G4's 2012 Live Comic Con in San Diego with Candace Bailey. In 2013, Barrowman began hosting the BBC One game show Pressure Pad and in 2014, he hosted Channel 4 show Superstar Dogs: Countdown to Crufts, which began airing on 17 February 2014. In 2014, Barrowman hosted the Channel 4 programme Small Animal Hospital and in October 2016, he was a guest team captain for an episode of Celebrity Juice and he guest presented an episode of The One Show.

=== Prime time drama ===
Barrowman's television career began with several appearances in short-lived prime-time soap operas. Barrowman first starred as Peter Fairchild in Central Park West (1995) a show American film critic Ken Tucker calls "a tale of ritzy, ditsy New York City careerists—some struggling to make it, others plotting to retain their status and power." Television critic David Hiltbrand called Barrowman's character a "Prince Charming ... a virtuous, hardworking assistant DA who keeps getting distracted by women who swoon in his path." Tucker noted Barrowman's character of Peter Fairchild to be "physically an eye-widening cross between John Kennedy Jr. and Hugh Grant". The show lasted for two seasons on CBS, from September 1995 to June 1996. Barrowman then appeared as Peter Williams in Titans (2000). According to writer Joanna Bober, in Titans, Barrowman plays a "ruthless mogul" who gains "control of the family's private aviation company (a fleet of 'Titans') from his semi-retired father" while increasing the profitability of the company amidst a series of soap opera intrigues. Titans was cancelled after airing eleven episodes. Barrowman was also considered for the role of Will in Will & Grace, but the producers reportedly felt he was "too straight" and the role eventually went to straight actor Eric McCormack instead. Commenting on the decision, Barrowman remarked, "The sad thing is it's run by gay men and women."

On 25 March 2008, Barrowman made a guest appearance in episode 22 of the BBC's Hotel Babylon. Entertainment Weekly reported that Barrowman would appear in the 2010 season of Desperate Housewives, "for a minimum of five episodes, portraying Patrick Logan, the ex-boyfriend at the center of the Angie Bolen (Drea de Matteo) mystery." On 23 February 2010, Barrowman announced on The One Show that his contract had been extended to a total of six episodes.

Barrowman starred in the ABC drama series pilot Gilded Lillys created and produced by Shonda Rhimes.

Barrowman portrayed Malcolm Merlyn, one of the main antagonists in The CW series Arrow from 2012 to 2019. Barrowman was a recurring cast member for the first two seasons and was promoted to a main cast member beginning with the third season. By July 2016, he signed a deal that allows him to continue being a series regular on Arrow as well as the other superhero shows produced by Greg Berlanti, including The Flash and Legends of Tomorrow. In the Flash third-season episode "Duet", he plays gangster Cutter Moran in the dreamworld the Music Meister sets up. Despite announcing in May 2017 that he is leaving the Arrowverse television franchise, Barrowman returned as Malcolm Merlyn in the second part of the Elseworlds crossover.

=== Film and reality television ===
Barrowman appeared as Ben Carpenter in the low-budget film Shark Attack 3: Megalodon (2002). His musical abilities are featured in several film roles: as Jack in the Cole Porter biopic De-Lovely (2004), singing a duet with Kevin Kline on the song "Night and Day"; and as the lead tenor Stormtrooper in The Producers (2005), singing "Springtime for Hitler". Barrowman co-presented and performed in the BBC One series The Sound of Musicals (2006).

Barrowman took part in the reality television series Dancing on Ice on ITV1 in January and February 2006. Resembling a real ice skating competition, ice dancers Jayne Torvill and Christopher Dean trained celebrities to compete on the show. His skating partner was World Junior Gold Medalist and three-time Russian champion Olga Sharutenko. On 4 February, despite being one of the favourites to win, Barrowman and Sharutenko faced Stefan Booth and his partner Kristina Lenko in the skate off and were eliminated by the judges' by a vote of 3 to 2. He was one of five celebrity guests on the Strictly Come Dancing Christmas Special (2010), and achieved both the top score and also first place when the audience vote had been counted. His professional partner was Kristina Rihanoff and they danced the Quickstep. In September 2012 Barrowman was a guest host on Attack of the Show!.

On 12 November 2018, Barrowman was confirmed to be participating in that year's series of I'm a Celebrity...Get Me Out of Here!. He eventually finished third behind Emily Atack and Harry Redknapp.

Also in 2018, Barrowman provided the voice of the villainous Hollywood star Flex Dexter in Fireman Sam: Set for Action! a special of the Welsh long running children's animated series. He got the role when he was introduced to his friend's partner who was a Mattel employee at a restaurant in Palm Springs, California.

=== Doctor Who and Torchwood ===
Barrowman played recurring guest character Captain Jack Harkness, an omnisexual time traveller from the 51st century in the BBC science fiction drama Doctor Who when the series was revived in 2005. His first appearance as Harkness was in the two-part story "The Empty Child"/"The Doctor Dances". He went on to appear in the next three episodes, "Boom Town", "Bad Wolf" and "The Parting of the Ways". Jack became so popular, he was given his own show – Torchwood, a Doctor Who spin-off series featuring a team of alien hunters based in modern-day Cardiff, which premiered in 2006. American film and television critic Ken Tucker describes Barrowman's role on Torchwood as "dashing", "utterly fabulous", "celestially promiscuous", and "like Tom Cruise with suspenders, but minus the Scientology". In the show, Jack "tracks down—and occasionally beds—ETs with the help of his quartet of bedazzled groupies—slash—Experts in Their Fields: One's a doctor, one's a cop, one's a scientist, and one... makes coffee and late nights piping hot. It's like the Justice League of Extended-Pinkie Nerds."

Barrowman continued to guest star in Doctor Who in 2007, appearing in "Utopia", "The Sound of Drums", and "Last of the Time Lords". He also participated in a Doctor Who special on the BBC's The Weakest Link. In 2008, Barrowman appeared in the two-part 2008 series finale, "The Stolen Earth"/"Journey's End" and reprised the role of Captain Jack Harkness in the "Doctor Who: Tonight's the Night" special. In 2010, Barrowman returned to Doctor Who with a cameo in "The End of Time" along with other previous stars.

Series 3 of Torchwood was broadcast in July 2009 as a miniseries of five episodes called Children of Earth. Filming of Series 4 called Torchwood: Miracle Day began on 11 January 2011, primarily in Los Angeles, and in and around Cardiff, Wales. The first episode of Miracle Day aired on Starz Network in the United States on 8 July 2011, and was broadcast on BBC One in the UK on 14 July 2011. Both Doctor Who and Torchwood became popular in the United States on the BBC America network. In November 2013 he appeared in the one-off 50th anniversary comedy homage The Five(ish) Doctors Reboot. Since 2015 he has continued to appear in an ongoing series of Torchwood audio plays for Big Finish Productions. In January 2020, Barrowman made a surprise appearance in "Fugitive of the Judoon", the fifth episode of Doctor Who's twelfth series. He appeared again in the 2021 New Year's Day special "Revolution of the Daleks".

=== Other ===
In 2014, he performed in the opening ceremony of the 2014 Commonwealth Games in Glasgow, Scotland.

He was a judge on the ITV celebrity skating competition Dancing on Ice for two seasons in 2020 and 2021, joining a judging panel consisting of Ashley Banjo, Jayne Torvill, and Christopher Dean. At the end of 2021, it was confirmed he had left the show and he would not return for the 2022 season, being replaced by Oti Mabuse.

== Books ==
Barrowman's memoir and autobiography, Anything Goes, was published in 2008 by Michael O'Mara Books. His sister, English professor and journalist Carole Barrowman, helped write the book using her brother's dictations. In 2009, Barrowman published I Am What I Am, his second memoir detailing his recent television work and musings on fame.

Barrowman's first published work of original fiction was a Torchwood comic strip, titled Captain Jack and the Selkie, co-written with sister Carole. Commenting on the characterisation of Jack Harkness in the comic strip Barrowman states: "We'd already agreed to tell a story that showed a side of Jack and a part of his history that hadn't been explored too much in other media. I wanted to give fans something original about Jack." This was followed by a series of Torchwood comics, published by Titan Comics between 2010 and 2017. Barrowman's début fantasy novel titled Hollow Earth, co-written with his sister Carole, was published in the United Kingdom on 2 February 2012, by Buster Books. The novel is about twins Matt and Emily ("Em") Calder who share an ability that allows them to make artwork come to life, due to their powerful imaginations. Their ability is sought after by antagonists who wish to use it to breach Hollow Earth—a realm in which all demons and monsters are trapped. Two sequels from the same team concerning Hollow Earth followed – The Bone Quill (2013) and The Book of Beasts (2014). This was followed by a second trilogy (the Orion Chronicles) continuing the adventures of Matt and Em, in Conjuror (2016), Nephilim (2017) and Inquisitor (2018). They also published a novel featuring Captain Jack, Torchwood: Exodus Code in 2012. In 2018, John and Carole Barrowman teamed up with Legendary Comics and graphic novelist Erika Lewis to create Acursian, featuring a modern-day anti-hero dealing with Celtic mythology.

== Charity and activism ==
Barrowman worked with Stonewall, a gay rights organisation in the UK, on the "Education for All" campaign against homophobia in schools. In April 2008, the group placed posters on 600 billboards that read, "Some people are gay. Get over it!" Barrowman contributed his support to the project asking people to join him: "Help exterminate homophobia. Be bold. Be brave. Be a buddy, not a bully." That same month, Barrowman spoke at the Oxford Union about his career, the entertainment industry, and gay rights issues. The event was filmed for the BBC programme The Making of Me, in an episode exploring the science of homosexuality. He was voted Entertainer of the Year in 2006 by Stonewall, and placed on the "Out 100" list for 2008, an annual list of notable LGBTQ people compiled by Out magazine. In June 2010, Barrowman met with then-Conservative Party leader and Prime Minister David Cameron as a representative of the LGBT community.

Barrowman was one of 48 British celebrities who signed a public notice warning voters against Conservative Party policy towards the BBC prior to the 2010 general election. In the 2012 presidential election, he endorsed Democratic Party candidate Barack Obama, who was running for re-election. Barrowman publicly supported Scotland remaining in the United Kingdom in the 2014 Scottish independence referendum, and was one of 200 public figures who were signatories to a letter to The Guardian opposing Scottish independence.

== Personal life ==
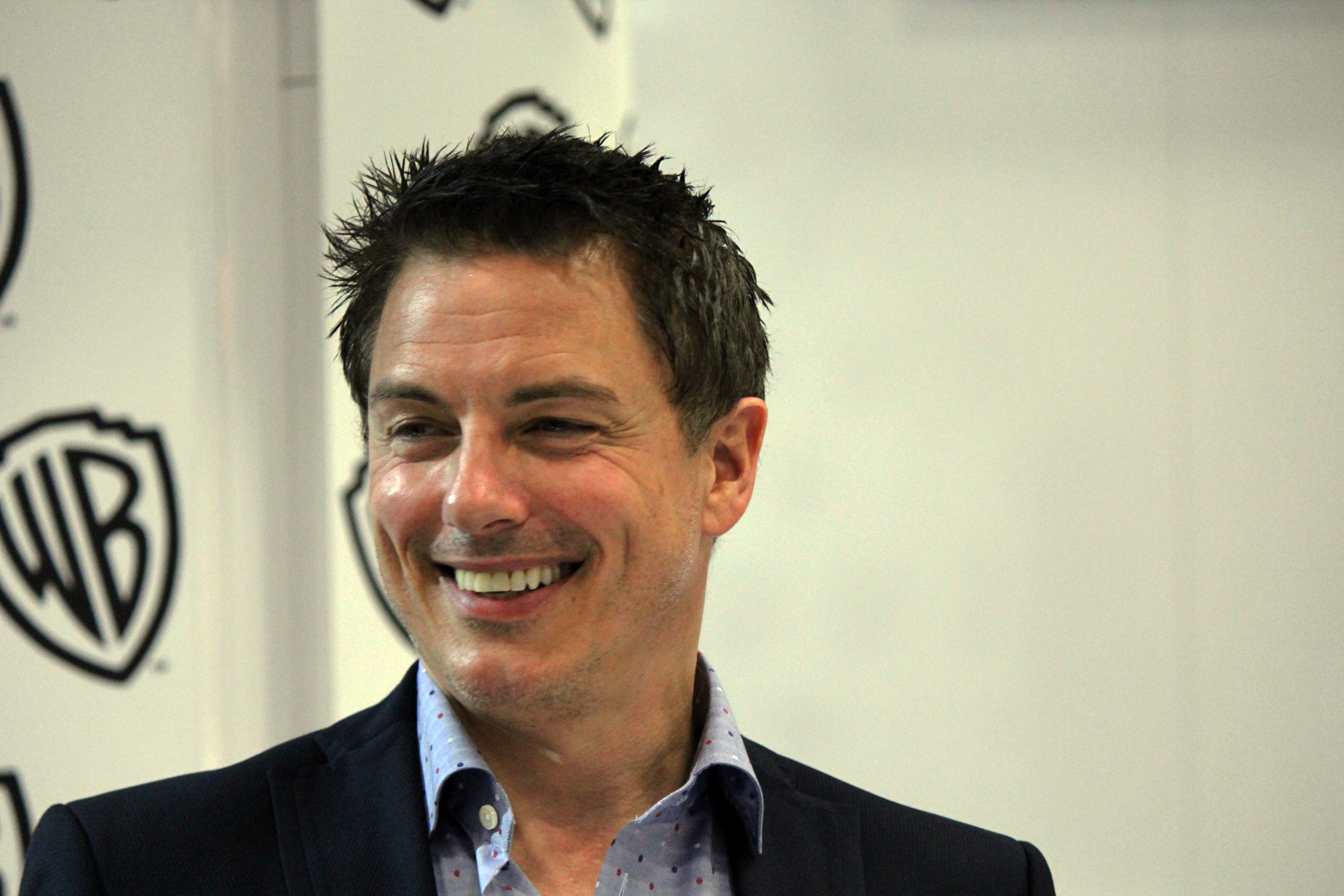
Barrowman in July 2014

Barrowman speaks with an American accent in public but switches to his original Scottish accent when with his family and when speaking to other Scottish people.

Barrowman met his husband, Scott Gill, after Gill came to see Barrowman in a production of Rope at the Chichester Festival Theatre in 1993. They split their time between homes in west London, Sully (near Cardiff), and Palm Springs, California. They entered into a civil partnership on 27 December 2006. A small ceremony was held in Cardiff with friends and family, with the cast of Torchwood and executive producer Russell T Davies as guests. The pair were legally married in California on 2 July 2013, following the Supreme Court's decision to deny an appeal against the reversal of California Proposition 8.

In 2011, Barrowman released his own skin care line, titled HIM.

In mid-March 2017, Barrowman and Gill held a "big bad garage sale" in their Palm Springs home, in which they sold Doctor Who and Torchwood memorabilia. Neighbours and fans showed up for the occasion, with Barrowman documenting most of the day on his social media accounts.

== Misconduct allegations ==
In February 2008, talking about Barrowman's on-set behaviour, Doctor Who co-star Freema Agyeman said in an interview to The London Paper newspaper, "John will walk about with his chap [penis] hanging out, having conversations with people."

On 30 November 2008, Barrowman exposed himself while on-air during an episode of Radio 1's Switch programme. The BBC and Barrowman subsequently apologised for any offence caused.

In a 2018 Playbill article, Barrowman publicly revealed that during a performance of Sunset Boulevard, he had exposed himself while standing behind a piano. Though hidden from the audience, it was in clear view of the actors on stage. This prompted a letter from the show's composer, Andrew Lloyd Webber, warning him not to "upstage the score with his appendage."

Following sexual harassment accusations made against Noel Clarke in April 2021, a video from a 2015 science-fiction convention surfaced wherein Clarke and Doctor Who co-stars Camille Coduri and Annette Badland discuss the 2005 episode "Boom Town" and reference Barrowman exposing himself. Julie Gardner, an executive producer on Doctor Who and Torchwood, confirmed that she received a complaint about Barrowman's on-set behaviour "around 2008", for which he was reprimanded at the time.

On 7 May 2021, Barrowman issued a statement that read:

My high-spirited behaviour which was only ever intended in good humour to entertain colleagues on set and back stage has been well-documented, including in my autobiographies and even in song. There were a couple of times during filming where I'd resort to tomfoolery, but none of this was ever intended nor interpreted as being sexual in nature.

With the benefit of hindsight, I understand that upset may have been caused by my exuberant behaviour and I have apologised for this previously. Since my apology in November 2008, my understanding and behaviour have also changed.

At no point was I ever made aware of any sexual harassment, bullying, or sexually predatory behaviour on set and I was certainly not aware of the allegations about Noel Clarke.

As a result of the allegations, a video featuring Barrowman was removed from the Doctor Who: Time Fracture theatre show, Big Finish removed the Torchwood release "Absent Friends" from pre-order and their release schedule, and Titan Comics shelved a graphic novel that was set to feature Captain Jack Harkness.

On 23 November 2021, Barrowman appeared on the daytime TV show Lorraine. With regard to the above, Barrowman stated:

I think if it was now, it would be crossing the line. Fifteen years ago was bawdy behaviour [...] the fact it was stories I've already told, haven't hidden anything [...] they've tried to turn them into sexual harassment which it absolutely is not. All the people that are making a fuss about it: they weren't there, they don't know the context of things that were done with my chap. Like I've said, I would never do it now.

In September 2024, Barrowman revealed that he became depressed, contemplating self-harm and suicide, following the accusations. Three months later, he stated that he had been "blackballed" and work had dried up, but then told Scotland Tonight that he regretted nothing.

== Filmography ==
=== Film ===
Year	Title	Role	Notes	Ref
1987	The Untouchables	Street person	Uncredited role	
2002	Shark Attack 3: Megalodon	Ben Carpenter		
2004	Dead Even aka Method	Timothy Stevens		
2004	De-Lovely	Jack		
2005	The Producers	Lead tenor stormtrooper	"Springtime for Hitler" production	
2012	Zero Dark Thirty	Jeremy		
2013	The Five(ish) Doctors Reboot	Himself	BBC Red Button webcast	
2013	All Stars	Matthew	Vertigo Films	
2018	Fireman Sam: Set For Action!	Flex Dexter	Voice	

=== Television ===
Year	Title	Role	Notes	Ref
1993–1995	Live & Kicking	Co–presenter		
1995–1996	Central Park West	Peter Fairchild	18 episodes	
1997	5's Company	Presenter		
2000–2001	Titans	Peter Williams	14 episodes	
2001	Putting It Together: Direct from Broadway	The Young Man	Television special	
2005	The Sound of Musicals	Presenter		
2005, 2007–2008, 2010, 2020–2021	Doctor Who	Captain Jack Harkness	Series 1, 3, 4 and 12; 13 episodes	
2006	Dancing on Ice	Contestant	Series 1	
2006	How Do You Solve a Problem like Maria?	Judge	British version	
2006–2008	Keys to the Castle	Presenter	2 series	
2006–2011	Torchwood	Captain Jack Harkness	Main cast; 41 episodes	
2006, 2012, 2019	This Morning	Guest co–presenter	12 episodes	
2007	Any Dream Will Do	Judge		
2008	Hotel Babylon	Simon		
2008	The Kids Are All Right	Presenter		
2008	How Do You Solve A Problem Like Maria?	Judge	Canadian version	
2008	The Making Of Me	Participant		
2009	Al Murray's Multiple Personality Disorder	Camp officer	2 episodes	
2009	My Family	The Doctor	Episode: "The Guru"	
2009–2011	Animals at Work	Presenter		
2009–2011	Tonight's the Night	Presenter	3 series	
2010	Desperate Housewives	Patrick Logan	Recurring role (5 episodes)	
2010	Strictly Come Dancing	Contestant	Christmas special; winner	
2010	The Super Hero Squad Show	Stranger	Voice only	
2010	So You Think You Can Dance?	Guest Judge	1 episode	
2012	Hustle	Dr. Dean Deville	Episode: "Eat Yourself Slender"	
2012	Gilded Lilys	Julius Ashford Lily	Unaired television pilot	
2012	BBC 999 Awards	Presenter		
2012	John Barrowman's Dallas	Presenter		
2012	Attack of the Show!	Presenter		
2012–2016	National Lottery Awards	Presenter	Annually	
2012–2019	Arrow	Malcolm Merlyn / Dark Archer / Ra's al Ghul	(Main: seasons 3–4; Recurring: seasons 1–2, 5; Special Guest: seasons 7–8)	
2013	Scandal	Fixer	Episode: "Any Questions?"	
2013–2014	Pressure Pad	Presenter		
2014	Superstar Dogs: Countdown to Crufts	Presenter		
2014	Sing Your Face Off	Presenter		
2014	Small Animal Hospital	Presenter		
2015, 2017	The Flash	Malcolm Merlyn, Cutter Moran	2 episodes	
2016	Reign	Lord Munro	Episode: "Intruders"	
2016	The One Show	Guest presenter		
2016–2017	Legends of Tomorrow	Malcolm Merlyn / Dark Archer	6 episodes	
2017	Battle of the Network Stars	Contestant	1 episode	
2018	DC Daily	Presenter	1 episode	
2018	I'm a Celebrity...Get Me Out of Here!	Contestant	Series 18	
2019–2022	All Star Musicals	Presenter		
2020	Holby City	Drew Nicholson-Heath		
2020–2021	QI	Himself	2 episodes	
2020–2021	Dancing on Ice	Judge	Series 12–13	
2024	Celebrity SAS: Who Dares Wins	Himself	Series 6	

=== Video games ===
Year	Title	Role	Notes	Ref
2015	Lego Dimensions	Captain Jack Harkness	Voice role	
2018	Lego DC Super-Villains	Malcolm Merlyn	Voice role	

== Theatre and concerts ==
Year(s)	Title	Role	Venue(s)	Location	Ref
1989–1990	Anything Goes	Billy Crocker	Prince Edward Theatre	West End	
1990–1991	Miss Saigon	Chris (alternate)	Theatre Royal, Drury Lane	West End	
1991	Matador	Domingo Hernandez	Queen's Theatre	West End	
1992	The Phantom of the Opera	Raoul	Her Majesty's Theatre	West End	
1993	Rope	Wyndham Brandon	Minerva Theatre, Chichester	Chichester	
1993	Hair	Claude	The Old Vic	London	
1993–1994	Miss Saigon	Chris	Theatre Royal, Drury Lane	West End	
1994–1996	Sunset Boulevard	Joe Gillis	Adelphi Theatre & Minskoff Theatre	West End & Broadway	
1996	Red Red Rose	Robert Burns	Musikhuset Aarhus	Denmark	
1996	Who Could Ask for Anything More? A Celebration of Ira Gershwin	Performer	Royal Albert Hall	London	
1997	Aspects of Love	Alex	Olympia Theatre, Dublin & Cork Opera House	Dublin & Cork	
1997	The Fix	Cal Chandler	Donmar Warehouse	Off-West End	
1997	Evita	Che	Oslo Spektrum	Oslo	
1998	Sondheim Tonight Charity Gala Concert	Performer	Barbican	London	
1998	Hey, Mr. Producer!	Cal Chandler	Lyceum Theatre	West End	
1998–1999	Putting It Together	The Younger Man	Mark Taper Forum & Ethel Barrymore Theatre	Los Angeles & New York	
1999–2000	Beauty and the Beast	The Beast / The Prince	Dominion Theatre	West End	
2002	Company	Bobby	Kennedy Center	Washington, D.C.	
2002–2003	It's Better with a Band	Young Man	Prince Music Theater	Philadelphia	
2003	Sondheim Celebration	Performer	Lincoln Center	New York	
2003	Love's Labour's Lost	Dumaine	National Theatre	London	
2003–2004	Anything Goes	Billy Crocker	Theatre Royal, Drury Lane	West End	
2004	The Beautiful and Damned	F. Scott Fitzgerald	Yvonne Arnaud Theatre	Guildford	
2004–2005	Chicago	Billy Flynn	Adelphi Theatre	London	
2005	Elegies – a Song Cycle	Performer	Arts Theatre	London	
2005	A Few Good Men	Lt Jack Ross	Theatre Royal Haymarket	London	
2005	West Side Story – a Tribute to Leonard Bernstein	Performer	Feldherrnhalle	Munich	
2005	Just So	Eldest Magician	Chichester Festival Theatre	Chichester	
2005–2006	Cinderella	Prince Charming	New Wimbledon Theatre	London	
2006–2007	Jack and the Beanstalk	Jack	New Theatre, Cardiff	Cardiff	
2007–2008	Aladdin	Aladdin	Hippodrome Theatre, Birmingham	Birmingham	
2008	Music Under the Stars: Faenol Festival	Performer	Faenol Estate	Wales	
2008	Andrew Lloyd Webber Birthday Concert	Host and performer	Hyde Park	London	
2008–2009	Robin Hood: The Pantomime Adventure	Robin Hood	Hippodrome Theatre	Birmingham	
2009	An Evening with John Barrowman – UK Concert Tour	Performer	—N/a	UK National Tour	
2009	Henley Festival	Performer	Main Stage	Henley on Thames	
2009	Barry Manilow – Proms in the Park	Special Guest Performer	Hyde Park	London	
2009–2010	Robin Hood: The Pantomime Adventure	Robin Hood	Hippodrome Theatre	Birmingham	
2010	La Cage aux Folles	Albin / Zaza	Playhouse Theatre	West End	
2010	Michael Feinstein in Concert	Special Guest Performer	London Palladium	West End	
2010	Proms in the Park	Performer	Buile Hill Park	Salford	
2010–2011	Aladdin	Aladdin	Clyde Auditorium	Glasgow	
2011	UK and Ireland Concert Tour	Performer	—N/a	UK and Ireland Tour	
2011–2012	Robinson Crusoe and the Caribbean Pirates	Robinson Crusoe	Clyde Auditorium	Glasgow	
2012	Gotta Sing, Gotta Dance	Performer	Hackney Empire	London	
2012–2013	Jack and the Beanstalk	Jack	Clyde Auditorium	Glasgow	
2013–2014	Dick Whittington	Dick	London Palladium	West End	
2014–2015	Cinderella	Buttons	Bristol Old Vic	Bristol	
2015	You Raise Me Up Concert Tour	Performer	—N/a	UK National Tour	
2016	Disney's Broadway Hits (also broadcast on TV and radio)	Host	Royal Albert Hall	London	
2016–2017	Dick Whittington	Dick	Hippodrome Theatre	Birmingham	
2018	John Barrowman in Concert	Performer	Hamer Hall, Melbourne	Melbourne	
2018	Broadway at Leicester Square	Performer	Leicester Square	London	
2019	One Night Only: Broadway Showstoppers	Performer	McCallum Theatre	Palm Desert	
2019	A Fabulous Tour	Performer	—N/a	UK National Tour	
2019	One Night Only – Brisbane	Performer	Queensland Performing Arts Centre	Queensland	
2019	A Fabulous Christmas Tour	Performer	—N/a	UK National Tour	
2024	Laid Bare	Performer	—N/a	UK National Tour	
2025	Camp as Christmas	Performer		UK National Tour	
2026	My Life In Musicals	Performer		UK National Tour	

== Discography ==
=== Studio albums ===
Title	Year	Label	Notes
Songs from Grease	1994	JAY Records	Consists of Grease songs
Aspects of Lloyd Webber	1997	JAY Records	Consists of songs by Andrew Lloyd Webber; Re-issued in 2007
Reflections from Broadway	2000	JAY Records	
Swings Cole Porter	2004	JAY Records	Reached No. 19 on the US Jazz Billboard Chart
Another Side	2007	Sony BMG	Reached No. 22 on the UK Albums Chart
Music Music Music	2008	Epic / Sony UK	Reached No. 35 on the UK Albums Chart
John Barrowman	2010	Arista	Debuted at No. 11 on the UK Albums Chart; highest album chart rating of Barrowman's to date
You Raise Me Up	2014	Barrowman Barker Productions	Funded by Pledge Music. Debuted at No. 16 on the UK Albums Chart
A Fabulous Christmas	2019	Decca	Reached No. 23 on the UK Albums Chart
Centre Stage	2022	WestWay Music	This album features The Royal Philharmonic Orchestra

=== Compilation albums ===
Title	Year	Label	Notes
The Essential John Barrowman	2008	Metro / Union Square	Consists of songs taken from albums recorded between 1994 and 2006; Reached No. 27 on the UK Budget Albums Chart
At His Very Best	2009	Metro / Union Square	Consists of songs taken from recordings between 1994 and 2006; Reached No. 19 on the UK Budget Albums Chart
Tonight's the Night: The Very Best Of	2011	Sony UK	Consists of two new songs, "I Owe It All to You" and "Tonight's the Night", and songs taken from Another Side (2007), Music Music Music (2008) and John Barrowman (2010); Debuted at No. 12 on the UK Albums Chart

=== Box set ===
Title	Year	Label	Notes
John Barrowman Collection	2010	Epic / Sony UK	Consists of Another Side (2007), Music Music Music (2008) and John Barrowman (2010); Reached No. 179 on the UK Albums Chart

=== Cast recordings ===
Title	Year	Label	Notes
Godspell	1997	JAY Records	1993 London cast recording
The Fix	1998	Relativity	Original London cast recording
Anything Goes	2003	First Night Records	2003 London cast recording
Just So	2006	First Night Records	World premiere cast recording

Performs two songs in The Flash episode, "Duet".

=== Soundtracks ===
Title	Year	Label	Notes
De-Lovely	2004	Columbia	Performs the song "Night and Day"
The Producers	2004	Sony BMG	Performs the song "Springtime for Hitler"

=== Other appearances ===
Title	Year	Label	Notes
Hey Mr Producer!	1998	First Night Records	Performs the song "One, Two Three" from The Fix
The Musicality of Andrew Lloyd Webber	2002	JAY Records	Performs the song "Any Dream Will Do" from Joseph and the Amazing Technicolor Dreamcoat
Essential Songs of Andrew Lloyd Webber	2002	Metro Music	Performs the song "High Flying, Adored" from Evita
Greatest Songs from the Musicals	2002	Soho	Performs the songs "Can You Feel the Love Tonight?" from The Lion King and "Grease" from Grease
Loving You	2002	JAY Records	Performs the song "Can You Feel the Love Tonight?" from The Lion King
HM The Queen's Diamond Jubilee Thames River Pageant	2012	BBC	Presenter
Commonwealth Games Opening Ceremony	2014	BBC	Performer. Broadcast in all Commonwealth countries

== Home DVD releases ==
- An Evening With John Barrowman (2009)
- John Barrowman: Live at the Royal Albert Hall (2010)
- John Barrowman: Collectors Edition- 2 disc DVD set

== Honours ==
- Barrowman was appointed Member of the Order of the British Empire (MBE) in the 2014 Birthday Honours for services to light entertainment and charity.
- In July 2011, Barrowman was awarded an honorary degree from the Royal Conservatoire of Scotland.
- Human Rights Campaign Visibility Award on 5 November 2016, for advocating on behalf of the LGBTQ community, including equality and justice for LGBTQ youth.

=== Awards and nominations ===
Year	Award	Nominated work	Result
1998	Laurence Olivier Award for Best Actor in a Musical	Cal Chandler in The Fix	Nominated
2007	BAFTA Cymru Award for Best Actor (Yr Actor Gorau)	Captain Jack Harkness in Torchwood	Nominated
2008	TV Quick Award for Best Actor	Captain Jack Harkness in Torchwood	Nominated
2010	TV Quick Award for Best Actor	Captain Jack Harkness in Torchwood: Children of Earth	Nominated
