= Carole Barrowman =

Scottish-American professor and writer (born 1959)

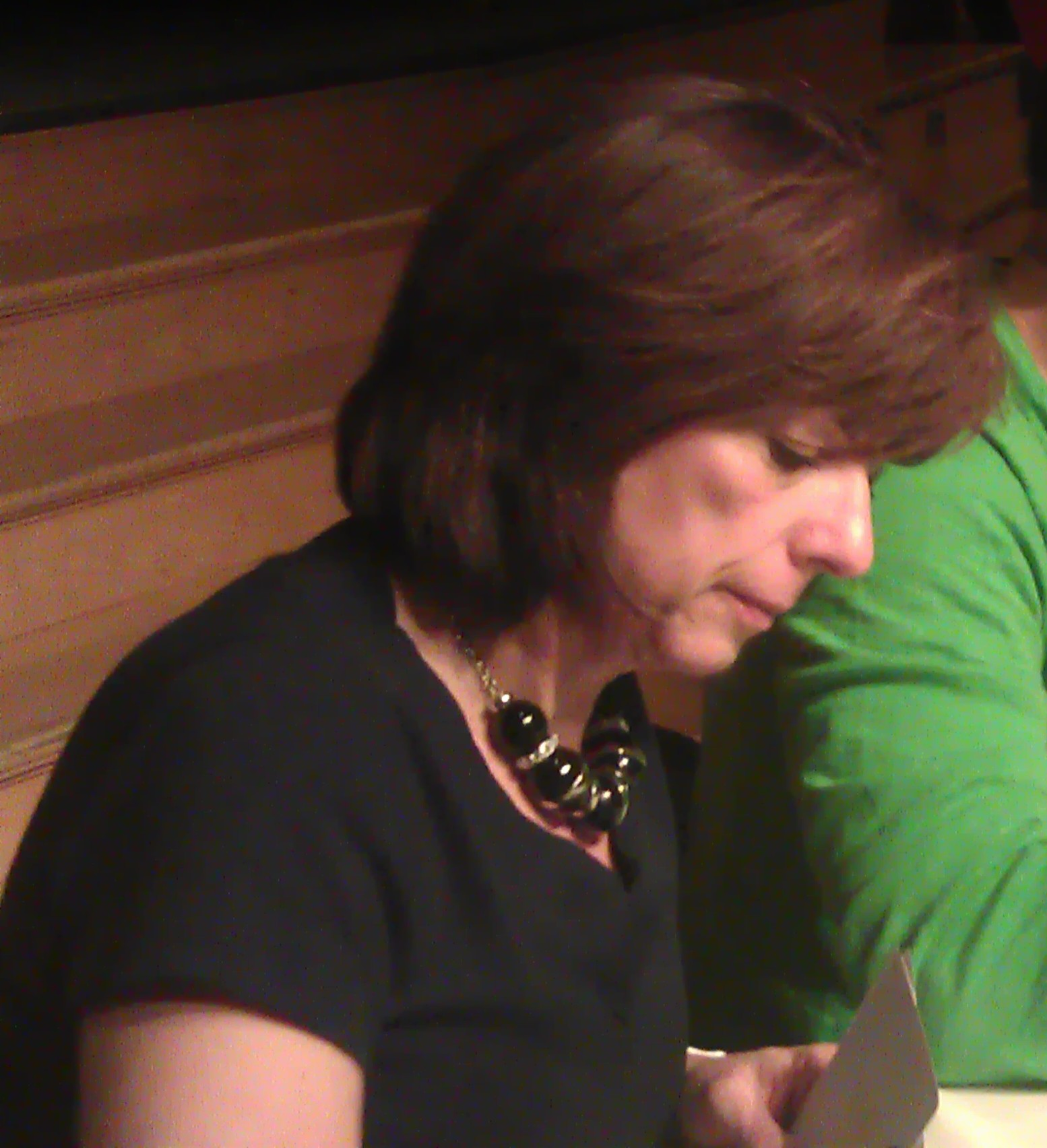
- Carole Barrowman signing copies of Hollow Earth at Alverno College in 2012
- Born: Carole Emily Barrowman; 20 April 1959 (age 67)
- Occupations: English professor; fiction reviewer; writer
- Relatives: John Barrowman (brother)
- Website: www.carolebarrowman.com

Carole Emily Barrowman (born 20 April 1959) is a Scottish-American writer and academic.

== Biography ==
She is Professor of English and Director of Creative Studies in Writing at Alverno College, Milwaukee, and a reviewer and crime fiction columnist for the Milwaukee Sentinel.

She is also known for her writing contributions with younger brother, actor, singer and dancer John Barrowman, best-known for his role as Jack Harkness in Doctor Who and Torchwood.

She was credited as co-author on her brother's memoir and autobiography, Anything Goes, which was published in 2008 by Michael O'Mara Books. Part of the writing process involved her transcribing her brother's dictations.

In 2009, John Barrowman published I Am What I Am, also featuring Carole as co-author. In addition to her brother's memoirs, the siblings co-wrote a Torchwood comic strip, featuring Jack Harkness, entitled Captain Jack and the Selkie. The Barrowman siblings' debut novel, titled Hollow Earth, was published in February 2012. In researching the novel, Carole traveled to the west coast of Scotland to visit some of the locations which she and her brother chose to feature in the book.

In addition to her published collaborations, she contributed an essay about her brother to the Hugo Award-winning non-fiction anthology Chicks Dig Time Lords.
