= New Heritage Theatre Group =

Theater and film production company

- Founded: 1964
- Founder: Roger Furman
- Type: Nonprofit
- Purpose: Black theatre, music, and film
- Location: New York City
- Region served: Harlem, New York
- Key people: Voza Rivers, Jamal Joseph
- Subsidiaries: IMPACT Repertory Theatre, New Heritage Films
- Website: https://www.newheritagetheatre.org
- Formerly called: New Heritage Repertory Theatre

New Heritage Theatre Group is the oldest active Black nonprofit theater company in New York City, established in 1964 by Roger Furman and later led by Voza Rivers and Jamal Joseph. Programs within the organization include the IMPACT Repertory Theatre, and the film production company New Heritage Films. Since its founding in 1964, the New Heritage Theatre Group has produced and presented theatrical, film, concert, and music productions.

== Early history ==
The New Heritage Theatre Group was established in 1964 as the New Heritage Repertory Theatre by Roger Furman, who was a playwright, director, and actor, initially as a street theatre company. Furman's theater career in Harlem began at the American Negro Theater in the 1940s, and he founded the New Heritage Repertory Theater with HARYOU-ACT, a federally financed social program in Harlem. Ruby Dee, Sidney Poitier, and Harry Belafonte joined the theatre as actors in its early location at a library on 130th Street. In 1966, Furman received a $48,000 youth theatre education grant from federal anti-poverty funds.

Plays produced under Furman's leadership include The Long Black Block (1972), which won an AUDELCO award for excellence in Black theater. Other productions in the more than 35 plays during his leadership of the organization include On Strivers Row, The Cat Walk, Fat Tuesday, Rashomon, and Monsieur Baptiste the Con Man.

=== New leadership and name change ===
In 1983 upon Furman's death, Voza Rivers took over leadership as the Executive Producer and changed the name of the organization to New Heritage Theatre Group. Katsuya Abe joined in 1987 and became the Director of International Relations. Jamal Joseph became the Executive Artistic Director in 1997. In December 2024, Daniel Beaty was named the creative producer.

== Divisions ==
=== IMPACT Repertory Theatre ===
IMPACT Repertory Theatre is the nonprofit youth division of New Heritage Theatre Group, which was founded in 1997 by artistic director Jamal Joseph, his wife Joyce Joseph, screenwriter Alice Arlen, and Voza Rivers. The program focuses on arts education and leadership training, as well as community service.

In 2008, the program received an Oscar award nomination for Best Original Song for their song Raise It Up from the movie August Rush starring Robin Williams. In December 2014, IMPACT performed a 20-minute piece in front of the Duke and Duchess of Cambridge alongside youth performers from youth empowerment organizations The Door and the CityKids Foundation.

Live performances have included the Plaza Hotel, the Green Haven Correctional Facility, and the Apollo Theater. IMPACT has also appeared on television programs broadcast on ABC, CBS, NBC, and Fox, and in the film Disappearing Acts.

=== New Heritage Films and the Harlemwood Film Festival ===
New Heritage Films and the Harlemwood Film Festival explores issues of the African diaspora through film. Annually, New Heritage Films features documentaries and films in the Harlem community from emerging and established filmmakers through the Harlemwood Film Festival.

New Heritage Fillms productions include Hughes' Dream Harlem (2002), Savoy King (2012), A-Alike (2003), Sonia Sanchez: Shake Loose Memories (2011) Percy Sutton: A Man for All Seasons, Da Zone, Drive By: A Love Story (1997), The Black New Yorkers, Burning Sands, The 95th Anniversary of the National Urban League, The 110th Anniversary of The Greater Harlem Chamber of Commerce, Harlem is...Music, Harlem is...Theater, and Harlem is... Gospel.

== International Programming ==
=== South Africa ===
In 1984, Phyllis Yvonne Stickney, an actress and co-producer at the New Heritage Theatre Group, worked with Duma Ndlovu to co-produce the New Heritage Theatre Group production of the play Woza Albert!, performed by South African actors including Percy Mtwa and Mbongeni Ngema, which was on tour in the United States.

In 1986, Ngema returned to the New Heritage Theatre Group with South African actors for a production of his play Asinamali! by Voza Rivers, Ndlovu and Andre Robinson Jr., several weeks after the local promoter of the show had been killed by a mob in South Africa. New Heritage Theatre Group additionally produced Sarafina! in 1987, and Rivers continued working with the playwrights and actors to develop an international tour for the show.

In 2014, the New York City organization Community Works expanded its historical exhibit about Black theatre to include the collaboration of New Heritage Theatre Group and the Lincoln Center with the South African playwrights, their plays, and the actors.

=== Japan ===
The connection between New Heritage Theatre Group and Japan began in 1986 when Voza Rivers and Katsuya Abe met at the Apollo Theater. From there, Abe worked with Harlem groups to coordinate then-Japanese Crown Prince Akihito's 1987 visit to Harlem. After that, Rivers and Abe developed the "Art of Black America" tour for Japan, which included music, theatre, and art, and Abe became the director of international relations at New Heritage Theatre Group. Rivers and Abe also produced events in New York City, including "Do Enka, East Meets West" at the Museum of the City of New York in 2010. In 2012, New Heritage Theatre Group produced the 100th anniversary of the Sakura Cherry Blossom Festival in Harlem.

== Collaborations ==
=== Shades of Truth Theatre ===
Shades of Truth Theatre and New Heritage Theatre Group have produced a variety of plays, including Camp Logan and Greenwood: An American Dream Destroyed by Celeste Bedford Walker. In 2019, the groups produced The Day Harlem Saved Dr. King, directed by Michael Green. In 2025, the groups produced Postal Madness with Michael Anthony Productions at the American Theatre of Actors in New York City.

Together they have also presented Jeff Stetson's The Meeting at venues throughout the Tri-State area and across the United States, as well as Black Wall Street: Ten Stories High, a series of short plays that chronicle the rise and fall of successful Black towns that were established during and post-reconstruction.

=== Take Wing and Soar Productions ===
Take Wing And Soar Productions is a nonprofit theatre company founded by Debra Ann Byrd to support women, youth, and classically trained actors of color, which joined with New Heritage Theatre Group to create the Harlem Shakespeare Festival in 2013. The annual Festival's mission is to foster understanding and unity in the arts by producing special events and plays with diverse casts and to create center stage opportunities for classically trained actors of color. Productions have included an all-female, multi-racial production of Othello: The Moor of Venice (2019).

New Heritage Theatre Group and Take Wing And Soar Productions also collaborated to produce Esther Armah's Savior? in 2011, and Oscar Wilde's The Important of Being Earnest in 2013, directed by Kevin Connell, which was nominated for five AUDELCO awards, including for Best Revival, as well as Lead Actress for Debra Ann Byrd.

== Community partners ==
City College of New York • Apollo Theatre Foundation • Columbia University Arts Initiative • Columbia University School of the Arts • Community Works NYC • El Museo del Barrio • Frank Silvera's Writers Workshop • Greater Harlem Chamber of Commerce • Harbor Conservatory for the Performing Arts • Harlem Arts Alliance • Harlem Jazz and Music Festival • Harlem Week • Museum of the City of New York • National Black Sports and Entertainment Hall of Fame • New Federal Theatre • The National Museum of Catholic Arts • Schomburg Center for Research in Black Culture • Tupac Amaru Shakur Center for The Arts

== Production Highlights (partial listing) ==
This list is a partial listing of productions New Heritage Theatre Group has produced or co-produced in conjunction with one or more of its collaborating partners.

=== Theatrical Productions ===
- Three Shades of Harlem (1964)
- Ruby Dee (1964)
- Hip, Black and Angry (1968)
- Another Shade of Harlem (1968)
- To Kill a Devil (1968)
- Wine in the Wilderness (1970)
- Madame Odum (1972)
- The Long Black Block (1972, 1973, 1975, 1995)
- Geraldine Fitzgerald's Three Penny Opera (1972)
- Mama Odun (1973)
- On Strivers Row (1973, 1974, 1984)
- Fat Tuesday (1976)
- Kingdom and the Ceremony (1977)
- Four O'Clock on a Rainy Afternoon (1978)
- The Legend of Deadwood Dick (1979)
- Roshamon (1979)
- Monsieur Baptiste the Con Man (1981)
- Clinton: An Urban Fairytale (1984)
- Casualties and Lesson Plans (1984)
- Zora (1984)
- Janin (1984)
- Woza Albert! (1984, 2004)
- When Chickens Come Home to Roost (1984, 2011)
- The Gimmick (1986)
- Asinimali! (1986)
- Sarafina! (1987)
- Township Fever! (1990)
- The Third Rhythm (1990)
- An Aftertaste of Sherry (1993)
- Madame CJ Walker (1995)
- Goddess City (1996)
- Spiritual Journey (1997)
- Five Stops on a Merry Go Round (2001)
- Tierno Bokar (2005)
- Winterkill (2005)
- Camp Logan (2006)
- Esther Armah: Can I Be Me? (2007)
- Martin, Malcolm and, Medgar (2008)
- Formerly Known as Sarah (2008)
- The Session (2008)
- Daniel Beaty: Resurrection (2008)
- Camp Logan (2008)
- Esther Armah: Forgive Me (2008)
- The Meeting (2009)
- Daniel Beaty: Tearing Down the Walls (2011)
- Lorey Hayes: Haiti's Children of God (2011)
- Massinissa (2011)
- Esther Armah: Savior? (2011)
- The Savoy King (2012)
- Daniel Beaty: Mr. Joy (2012)
- The Fannie Lou Hamer Story (2012)
- Circumstances (2012)
- Daniel Beaty: Through the Night (2012)
- Love to All Lorraine (2012)
- Daniel Beaty: Emergency (2012)
- Coriolanus: An African Warrior
- Adam (2012, 2013)
- The Importance of Being Earnest (2013, 2020)
- Harlem Shakespeare Festival (2013)
- Benefits (2013)
- The Firefighters (2014)
- IMPACT: Peace Warriors (2014)
- Sable Series (2014, 2018)
- Lissabon (2014)
- Whistle in Mississippi (2014)
- The People vs. Clarendon County (2014)
- The Kitchen (2014)
- Inamori Project: Prayer, Love and Peace (2012, 2014)
- Annual Harlem Shakespeare Festival (2013, 2014)
- Black Wall Street (2014)
- The Dawn of the Rooster (2015)
- A Double Encore Production (2015)
- Anne and Emmett (2015)
- Othello: The Moor of Venice (2015)
- Gravity of Love (2017)
- Holding On (2012-2019)
- Urge to Purge (2018)
- March On (2018)
- Unheard Noted (2018)
- Barbra Jordan (2018)
- Father's Day (2018)
- Mable Madness(2018)
- Harlem Saved a King (2018)
- Tales of Women (2018)
- Black Turns Gold (2018)
- The Meeting (2012-2018)
- Truebone (2016-2019)
- The Fannie Lou Hammer Story: Sick and Tired of Being Sick and Tired (2018-2019)
- Reading of FOUNDATION (2019)
- One Last Night Before Sempiternity (2019)
- Fifi Dalla The African Pearl (2019)
- Holding On (2019)
- My Harlem 'Tis of Thee (2019)
- It Can't Happen Here (2020)
- Turning 15 On The Road To Freedom (2020)
- Casting the Vote (2020)
- The Fannie Lou Hammer Story Live on Facebook and Instagram (2020)
- It is Africa (2020)
- Postal Madness (2025)

=== Concert Productions ===
- Let The Music Say Amen (1993)
- Roger Furman's 30th Anniversary Celebration (1994)
- 3 Guys Named Joe (1997)
- TriHarLenium Continues (2000)
- Higher Ground: Expression In Dance and Song (2001)
- IMPACT: 6th Anniversary (2002)
- Ken Hicks: Sings Avanti (2005)
- Jazz for Peace (2005)
- Harlem Ladies in Music (2006)
- Write On Rosie (2006)
- Ebony Stages A Celebration of Contemporary Black Theater, American Museum of Natural History (2006)
- Lee Olive Tucker, Museum of the City of New York (2006)
- Craig Harris' God's Trombones (2006)
- Kwanzaa Spirit, American Museum of Natural History (2006)
- Kwanzaa Celebration, American Museum of Natural History (2007)
- Late Great Ladies of Blues and Jazz (2007)
- IMPACT 10th Anniversary Gala and Screening of August Rush (2007)
- Voices for Peace (2007)
- Unheard Notes (2007)
- It's Always You, Lainie Cooke (2007)
- Kwanzaa, American Museum of Natural History (2008)
- Do Enka (2008)
- Berta's Jam (2008)
- Do Wop Love (2008)
- Pass the Torch Blues Tap and Swing (2008)
- All of Me, Lainie Cooke (2009)
- Artspeak with Tsidii (2009)
- Jazz for Peace (2009)
- IMPACT nominated for Academy Award for the song "Raise it Up", on the August Rush Soundtrack (2008)
- IMPACT: Raise it Up at 2008 Oscar Award Ceremony (2008)
- IMPACT: Raise it Up at the Apollo Theater (2008)
- Wild Women Don't Have the Blues (2009)
- IMPACT Vibe: Concert (2009)
- IMPACT: Raise It Up (2009)
- IMPACT: I Live (2010)
- It's Always You featuring Lainie Cooke (2010)
- The Sakura Cherry Blossom Festival (2010)
- Harlem 4 Japan Benefit Concert (2010)
- Message Behind the Music with Obediah Wright (2010)
- Do Enka Concert (2010)
- Kwanzaa 2010: The Legacy Continues with McCollough Invaders, and Kochegena (2010)
- Nothin' But the Blues (2010)
- The Sakura Cherry Blossom Festival (2010)
- Berta's Jam II (2011)
- IMPACT: Dream Keepers (2011)
- Saluting our Jazz Elders with Joey Morant and New Amsterdam Music Association and Randy Weston (2011)
- Speaking in Rhythm featuring IMPACT (2011)
- Removing the Bars (2012)
- Voices from Japan (2012)
- Do Enka II (2012)
- In the Spirit What's Your Groove (2012)
- IMPACT Repertory Theatre 15th Anniversary Celebration (2012)
- R&B & Blues: IMPACT Legacy, Kwame & The Uptown Shakedown (2012)
- First Fruits of the Harvest Kwanzaa Celebration featuring B Smith Restoration Theatre (2012)
- African American Musical Mosaic: First Corinthian Baptist Church Choir, Sandra Reeves Phillips, IMPACT with Darryl "DMC" McDaniels
- Stories We Tell: A Tribute to Storytellers (2012)
- Global Weekends: 35th Anniversary Celebration Kwanzaa at the American Museum of Natural History (2013)
- Focus on Peace: Art Exhibition and Taiko Japanese Drummers (2014)
- International Jazz Festival (2015)
- Tribute to Ben E King (December 2015)
- Lainie Cooke in Concert (2018)
- Musical Tribute to Hugh Masakela (2019)
- Biko Rising (2019)
- More or Less I am (2019)
- Harlem Celebrates Cuba and its Music (2019)
- It is Africa (2020)

=== Film Productions and Events ===
- Hughes' Dream Harlem (Film) (2002)
- International Black Panther Film Festival (2003)
- It's Always You: Lainie Cooke (2007, 2010)
- A Celebration of the Life and work of Lorraine Hansberry (2010)
- Harlem is… Gospel, Documentary (2011)
- Harlem is… Music, Documentary (2011)
- Harlem is… Theater, Documentary (2011)
- Black Panther Film Festival (2011)
- R&B & Blues: IMPACT Legacy, Kwame & The Uptown Shakedown (2012)
- "Tilai" : Harlemwood Film Festival (2012)
- Savoy King (2012)
- Screening, Premiere or ESPN 30 for 20 Series One Night in Vegas (2012)
- Elza, Screening (2012)
- We Remember Sassy with Mzuri Moyo (2013)
- Focus on Peace: Art Exhibition and Taiko Japanese Drummers (2013)
- "Anom Du Christ" Harlemwood Film Festival (2013)
- Yuri Kochiyama Memorial (2014)
- Finding Fela, Screening (2014)
- Twenty Feet From Stardom, Screening (2014)
- Chapter & Verse (2015)
- SummerStage Harlem (2019)
- True See (2019)
