= List of awards and nominations received by Gabourey Sidibe =

Gabourey Sidibe awards and nominations
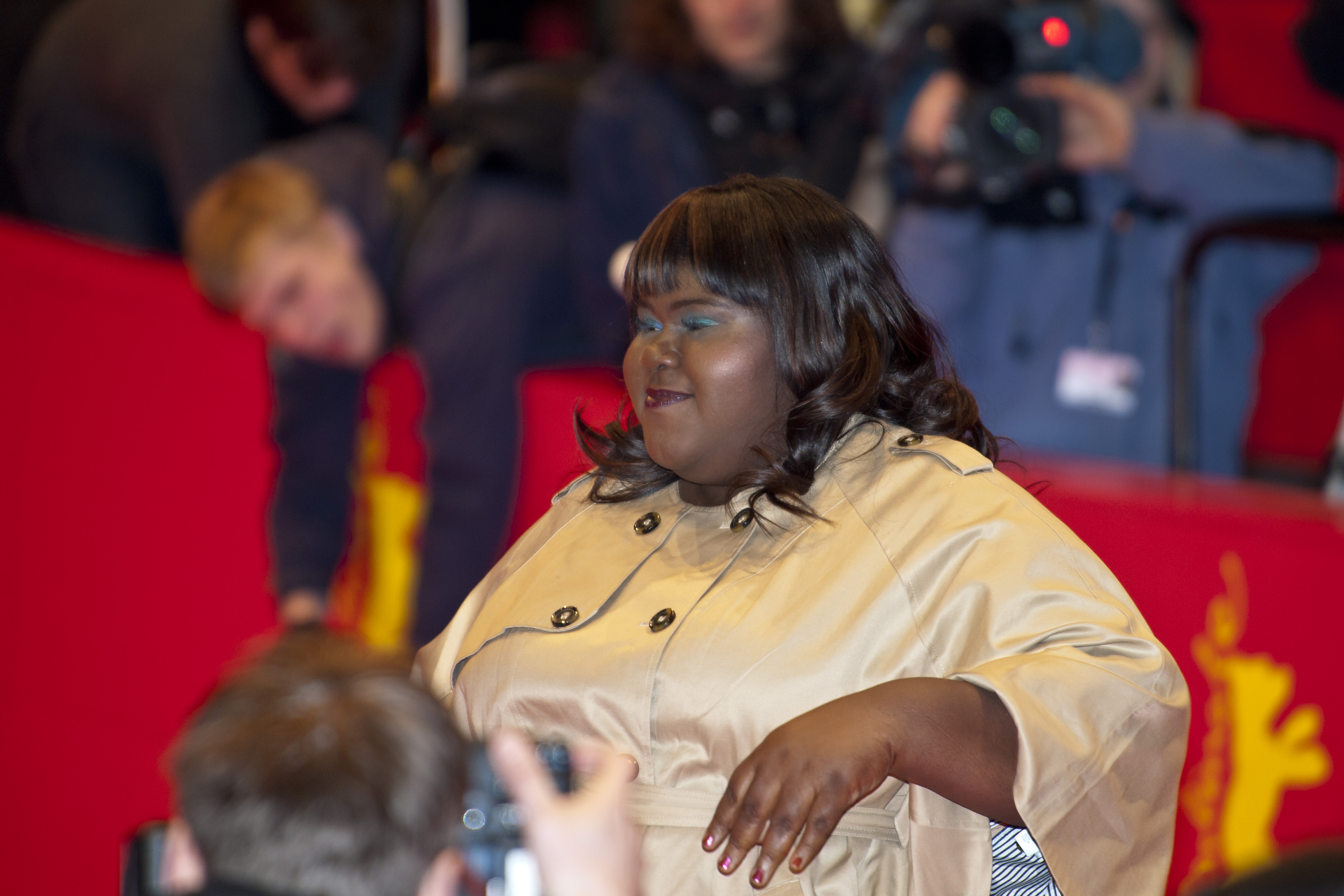
- Sidibe at the Berlin Film Festival in 2011
Awards and nominations
Award	Wins	Nominations
Academy Awards	0	1
British Academy Film Awards	0	1
Critics' Choice Awards	0	1
Golden Globe Awards	0	1
Screen Actors Guild Awards	0	2

Totals (Note: Certain award groups do not simply award one winner. They acknowledge several different recipients, have runners-up, and have third place. Since this is a specific recognition and is different from losing an award, runner-up mentions are considered wins in this award tally. For simplification and to avoid errors, each award in this list has been presumed to have had a prior nomination.)
- Wins: 16
- Nominations: 44

Gabourey Sidibe is an American actress. She has received several accolades for her roles across American film and television, including nominations for an Academy Award (Oscar), a British Academy Film Award (BAFTA), a Critics' Choice Award, a Golden Globe Award, and two Screen Actors Guild Awards (SAGs). Overall, she has won 16 awards from 44 nominations.

Sidibe is most acclaimed for her debut breakout role at the age of 26 in Precious: Based on the Novel "Push" by Sapphire (2009), a drama film about a young woman struggling against poverty and abuse. For Precious, she won the Independent Spirit Award for Best Female Lead, the National Board of Review Award for Breakthrough Performance and the NAACP Image Award for Outstanding Actress in a Motion Picture, and earned Best Actress nominations at the Academy Awards, BAFTA Awards, Critics' Choice Awards, Golden Globe Awards, and SAG Awards. She is the eighth black nominee for the Best Actress Academy Award and, as of 2025, one of fifteen black nominees. She was also nominated for the SAG Award for Outstanding Ensemble with the cast of Precious.

Sidibe received further accolades for roles including the comedy drama series The Big C (2010–2013), the satirical drama film Seven Psychopaths (2012), the anthology horror series American Horror Story (2013–2018) and its sequel American Horror Stories (2022), the comedy series Empire (2015–2020), and the horror thriller film Antebellum (2020). She won a Black Reel Award for directing The Tale of Four (2017), a film about four different women with four different paths whose lives interconnect. Her other commercially successful films include the heist comedy Tower Heist (2011) and the romantic comedy Top Five (2014).

== Major associations ==
Major awards and nominations received by Gabourey Sidibe
Association	Year	Category	Work	Result	Ref.
Academy Awards	2010	Best Actress	Precious	Nominated	
British Academy Film Awards	2010	Best Actress in a Leading Role	Precious	Nominated	
Critics' Choice Awards	2010	Best Actress	Precious	Nominated	
Golden Globe Awards	2010	Best Actress in a Motion Picture – Drama	Precious	Nominated	
Screen Actors Guild Awards	2010	Outstanding Performance by a Female Actor in a Leading Role	Precious	Nominated	
Screen Actors Guild Awards	2010	Outstanding Performance by a Cast in a Motion Picture	Precious	Nominated	

== Miscellaneous awards ==
Miscellaneous awards and nominations received by Gabourey Sidibe
Association	Year	Category	Work	Result	Ref.
Alliance of Women Film Journalists Awards	2009	Best Actress	Precious	Nominated	
Alliance of Women Film Journalists Awards	2009	Best Breakthrough Performance	Precious	Nominated	
Alliance of Women Film Journalists Awards	2009	Bravest Performance Award	Precious	Nominated	
Black Reel Awards	2010	Outstanding Actress	Precious	Won	
Black Reel Awards	2010	Outstanding Breakthrough Performance	Precious	Won	
Black Reel Awards	2019	Outstanding Short	The Tale of Four	Won	
Black Reel Awards	2021	Best Supporting Actress	Antebellum	Nominated	
BET Awards	2010	Best Actress	Precious	Nominated	
Independent Spirit Awards	2010	Best Female Lead	Precious	Won	
MTV Movie & TV Awards	2010	Best Breakout Star	Precious	Nominated	
NAACP Image Awards	2010	Outstanding Actress in a Motion Picture	Precious	Won	
NAACP Image Awards	2012	Outstanding Supporting Actress in a Comedy Series	The Big C	Nominated	
NAACP Image Awards	2013	Outstanding Supporting Actress in a Comedy Series	The Big C	Nominated	
NAACP Image Awards	2014	Outstanding Actress in a Television Movie, Mini-Series or Dramatic Special	American Horror Story	Nominated	
NAACP Image Awards	2021	Outstanding Supporting Actress in a Motion Picture	Antebellum	Nominated	
NAACP Image Awards	2023	Outstanding Guest Performance	American Horror Stories	Nominated	
National Board of Review Awards	2010	Breakthrough Performance	Precious	Won	
Satellite Awards	2009	Outstanding New Talent	Precious	Won	
Teen Choice Awards	2015	Choice TV Chemistry	Empire	Nominated	

== Critics associations ==
Critics awards and nominations received by Gabourey Sidibe
Association	Year	Category	Work	Result	Ref.
African-American Film Critics Association Awards	2009	Best Actress	Precious	Nominated	
Boston Society of Film Critics Awards	2009	Best Cast	Precious	Won	
Boston Society of Film Critics Awards	2012	Best Cast	Seven Psychopaths	Won	
Chicago Film Critics Association Awards	2009	Best Actress	Precious	Nominated	
Chicago Film Critics Association Awards	2009	Most Promising Performer	Precious	Nominated	
Detroit Film Critics Society Awards	2009	Best Actress	Precious	Won	
Detroit Film Critics Society Awards	2009	Best Breakthrough Performance	Precious	Won	
Detroit Film Critics Society Awards	2009	Best Ensemble	Precious	Nominated	
Florida Film Critics Circle Awards	2009	Best Actress	Precious	Won	
Florida Film Critics Circle Awards	2009	Pauline Kael Breakout Award	Precious	Won	
Houston Film Critics Society Awards	2009	Best Actress	Precious	Nominated	
Iowa Film Critics Society Awards	2010	Best Actress	Precious	Won	
Online Film Critics Society Awards	2010	Best Actress	Precious	Nominated	
San Diego Film Critics Society Awards	2012	Best Performance by an Ensemble	Seven Psychopaths	Nominated	
St. Louis Gateway Film Critics Awards	2009	Best Actress	Precious	Nominated	
Washington D.C. Area Film Critics Association	2009	Best Actress	Precious	Nominated	
Washington D.C. Area Film Critics Association	2009	Best Breakthrough Performance	Precious	Nominated	
Washington D.C. Area Film Critics Association	2009	Best Ensemble	Precious	Nominated	
Women Film Critics Circle Awards	2009	Best Young Actress	Precious	Won	

== See also ==
- List of black Academy Award winners and nominees
