= Lloyd A. Williams =

American community leader (1945–2025)

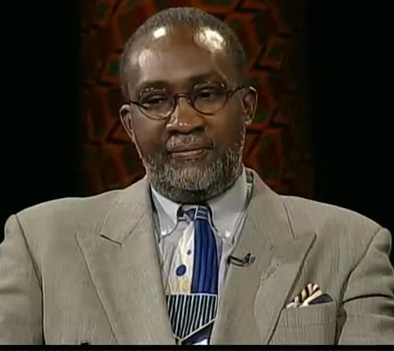
- Williams on CUNY TV's African American Legends, 1998

President of the Greater Harlem Chamber of Commerce
- In office 1983–2025

Personal details
- Born: Lloyd Ashburn Williams; January 16, 1945 Colony of Jamaica
- Died: August 6, 2025 (aged 80) Manhattan, New York, U.S.
- Spouse: Valorie Roberson-Williams
- Children: 1
- Occupation: Community leader
- Known for: Co-founding Harlem Week

Lloyd Ashburn Williams (January 16, 1945 – August 6, 2025) was an American community leader based in Harlem. He was president and chief executive officer of the Greater Harlem Chamber of Commerce and co-founded Harlem Week.

== Biography ==
Lloyd Ashburn Williams was born on January 16, 1945, in the Colony of Jamaica to Alfred, a chauffeur, and Violet, an evangelist, and emigrated to the United States with his family when he was two years old. Raised in Harlem, where some of his relatives lived in the past few decades, he lived in the section of 120th Street located between Lenox Avenue and Seventh Avenue. Malcolm X was his godfather, something he frequently talked with associates about. After attending George Washington High School and Brooklyn Technical High School, he became a business major at Syracuse University and subsequently an intern at Manufacturers Hanover Trust Company.

In 1973, Williams was recruited by Hope Stevens to be vice-president of programs at the Uptown Chamber of Commerce (now the Greater Harlem Chamber of Commerce/GHCC), where the latter was serving as president. He was promoted to executive vice president following Stevens's 1976 death, and eventually president in 1983. As president and chief executive officer of the GHCC till his death at the age of 80, he oversaw economic change and rising tourism throughout the neighborhood.

Alongside Manhattan Borough President Percy Sutton and close friend Voza Rivers, Williams was one of the co-founders of Harlem Week, which they did in 1974 – originally called Harlem Day – "to spread positivity during a difficult time for Harlem". They oversaw a long growth of the festival from a one-day event to a multi-day "major celebration of arts, culture and community", which Barbara Russo-Lennon of amNewYork called "one of the city's most iconic neighborhood events".

Williams also collaborated with local leaders to record the neighborhood's historical and cultural heritage, eventually producing the book Forever Harlem. Herb Boyd of the New York Amsterdam News recalled of Williams: "Very little transpired in Harlem without Williams' knowledge, and far too many instances without his imprimatur. When he called a meeting, the movers and shakers of Harlem showed up, along with several of the city's major players—and if anyone arrived late they knew a chastisement from him would be part of the minutes."

Williams was an advisor in several committees on both the national and local level. He was a founding member of the National Jazz Museum in Harlem, an editorial board member at NY Carib News, and a foundation board member at the University of the West Indies. In 2018, he received an honorary doctorate of law from UWI.

He was married to Valorie Roberson-Williams and had a son.

Williams died at his home in Manhattan from prostate cancer, on August 6, 2025, at the age of 80. The GHCC paid tribute to Williams and announced that the rest of that year's Harlem Week, into its fifth day at the time, would proceed as scheduled to honor his life and legacy. He also received a tribute from U.S. Representative Yvette Clarke.
