= Daniel Beaty =

American playwright, actor, singer

- Education: Yale University; American Conservatory Theater
- Occupations: Playwright, actor, singer, composer, producer
- Writing career
- Years active: 1998-present
- Genres: Theatre, film, poetry, music
- Notable awards: Obie Award, NAACP Theatre Awards
- Website: www.danielkoabeaty.com

Daniel Beaty is an American playwright, actor, singer, writer, composer and poet. Plays written by Beaty include Emergency, Resurrection, Through the Night, The Tallest Tree in the Forest, Mr. Joy, and the musical Breath & Imagination.

Books authored by Beaty include the 2013 children's book Knock Knock: My Dad's Dream for Me. Beaty also co-wrote and starred in the 2016 film Chapter & Verse. In 2024, Beaty was named creative producer of New Heritage Theatre Group.

== Early life and education ==
Daniel Beaty was raised in Dayton, Ohio, and began writing as well as giving public speeches in third grade. Beaty later won scholarships to private high school and then Yale University. Beaty studied English and music at Yale and completed a BA with Honors in 1998.

Upon graduating, Beaty was awarded the Louis Sudler Prize for Excellence in the Arts. During his undergrad, Beaty was granted a production at The Yale Cabaret. His original two-person play on the life of Paul Robeson remained the highest grossing production at the Yale Cabaret for several years.

Beaty holds an MFA in Acting from the American Conservatory Theater (ACT) in San Francisco. While training as an actor, Beaty was also pursued a course of study as a playwright and performance artist, performing productions of his solo plays.

== Career ==
Beaty moved to New York City from San Francisco two weeks before the September 11 attacks in 2001. During his early career in New York City, he taught in the Bronx and performed slam poetry.

=== Theatre ===
==== Emergence-See! and Emergency ====
In 2003, an Off-Off-Broadway festival performance by Beaty of an early version of his one-man show Emergence-See! was attended by Ruby Dee, who was moved by his performance to become an advisor and advocate for him, including to have the play produced by Larry Leon Hamlin at the National Black Theatre Festival. In 2006, Beaty premiered Emergence-See! at The Public Theater in New York, with Beaty playing more than 40 characters and directed by Kenny Leon. In 2008, the play was renamed Emergency, directed by Charles Randolph-Wright, and produced at the Geffen Playhouse in Los Angeles, where Beatty again performed the more than 40 characters in the play. In 2013, Beaty performed Emergency at the Cutler Majestic Theatre in Boston.

==== Resurrection ====
Beaty was awarded the 2007-08 AETNA American Voices Playwright-in-Residence position at Hartford Stage, which included workshopping his play Resurrection. His ensemble play Resurrection, featuring six Black male characters and directed by Oz Scott, premiered at Arena Stage in Washington, D.C., in 2008, which was followed by productions at Hartford Stage and the Suzanne Roberts Theatre in Philadelphia. In September 2009, Resurrection was produced at the ETA Creative Arts Foundation theater in Chicago and directed by Cheryl Lynn Bruce.

==== Through the Night ====
Beaty's solo play Through the Night first opened at the Riverside Theater in New York City, then was produced off-Broadway in 2010 at Union Square Theatre, directed by Charles Randolph-Wright with Beaty performing the multiple characters in the play. In 2012, the show was produced at the Cincinnati Playhouse in the Park, with Beaty playing the six characters, and the City Theatre in Pittsburgh, with Beaty directing and playing all of the roles. In 2016, the show was performed as an ensemble production at the Centre Stage theater in South Carolina, directed by Clark Nesbitt.

==== The Tallest Tree in the Forest ====
The Tallest Tree in the Forest was commissioned by the Tectonic Theatre Project, founded by Moisés Kaufman. Beaty wrote the solo-actor play with nearly 40 roles based on the life of Paul Robeson, and the play premiered at La Jolla Playhouse in 2014, with Beaty performing and directed by Kaufman. The play performed by Beaty and directed by Kaufman was also produced at the Brooklyn Academy of Music in 2015.

==== Mr. Joy ====
Beaty's solo-actor play Mr. Joy was inspired by his early experience in New York City as a customer of a Chinese immigrant who owned a local shoe repair shop. The play appeared at the Riverside Theatre in May 2012, directed by Sheryl Kaller, co-presented by the New Heritage Theatre Group. In 2015, the play was produced at the City Theatre in Pittsburgh, with actress Tangela Large performing all of the nine characters, directed by Lou Jacob. Large also performed the play in a 2015 production at ArtsEmerson in Boston, directed by the artistic director for ArtsEmerson, David Dower, while Beaty was an artist-in-residence at ArtsEmerson. A production was also staged in 2025 at the Chester Theatre Company in Massachusetts, performed by Godfrey Simmons and directed by Vernice Miller.

==== Breath & Imagination ====
Beaty wrote a musical titled Breath & Imagination, based on the life of Roland Hayes, the son of a former slave who became a classical vocalist who performed in Europe for royalty and became the first African-American to sing at Symphony Hall in Boston. In 2013, the musical was produced at Hartford Stage, starring the baritone Jubilant Sykes as Roland. While Beaty was an artist-in-residence at ArtsEmerson, he further developed Breath & Imagination, and the musical was produced at the Paramount Theatre in Boston in 2015, directed by David Dower. The musical was also performed in Boston in 2018, by The Lyric Stage Company and The Front Porch Arts Collective, directed by Maurice Emmanuel Parent.

==== New Heritage Theatre Group ====
By 2014, Beaty had developed five plays at the New Heritage Theatre Group in Harlem, and in 2024, Beaty was named the creative producer at the New Heritage Theatre Group.

=== Film ===
Beaty was seen on the third and fourth seasons of HBO's Russell Simmons Presents Def Poetry; as a guest artist on NBC's Showtime at the Apollo with Rueben Studdard; and on BET's 106 & Park.

Beaty was hired by Showtime to create an original half-hour series based on his play Emergency and by Spitfire Pictures to create an original screenplay about the life of George Moses Horton, an African-American poet born into slavery.

Beaty co-wrote and starred in the 2016 film Chapter & Verse, directed by Jamal Joseph.

=== Music ===
In October 2008, Daniel collaborated with composer and violinist Daniel Bernard Roumain on an orchestral work titled Darwin's Meditation for the People of Lincoln that premiered at the BAM Next Wave Festival and continues to tour nationally and internationally. His family musical Trippin’ was optioned by Disney and produced by Harlem Stage.

=== Teacher ===
After graduate school, Beaty began teaching acting, singing and writing in Brooklyn, Harlem, and the Bronx. Beaty has worked as an adjunct professor in the Graduate School of the Arts at Columbia University.

== Awards ==
- 2004 Grand Slam Champion at the Nuyorican Poet's Café
- 2007 Obie Award for Excellence in Off-Broadway Theater for Writing & Performing
- 2007 AUDELCO Award for Solo Performance
- 2007 New York Culture Award for Best in Theater
- 2007 Scotsman Fringe First Award for the best new writer at the Edinburgh Festival
- Lamplighter Award from the Black Leadership Forum in Washington, D.C.
- 2008 Edgerton Foundation's new American Play Award
- 2008 Helen Hayes Award nominations for the best in theater in Washington, D.C.
- 2008 winner of the Unique Theatrical Experience Award from the New Jersey Star Ledger
- 2009 NAACP Theater Awards including Best Actor
- 2010 NAACP Theater Award for Best Solo Show
- 2010 AUDELCO Award for Solo Performance
- 2010 Ovation Award for Best Leading Actor in a Play
- 2011 Peter Slenderize Memorial Award from Theater Communications Group

== Published works ==
- Emergency & Through the Night. Samuel French Inc. 2011. ISBN 9780573699528.
- Transforming Pain to Power, Unlock Your Unlimited Potential, Penguin Group, 2014, ISBN 9780425267486
- Knock Knock: My Dad's Dream for Me, Little Brown Books for Young Readers, 2013, ISBN 9780316400947
