= Chapter & Verse (film) =

2016 American drama film

- Film poster
- Directed by: Jamal Joseph
- Written by: Jamal Joseph; Daniel Beaty
- Produced by: Cheryl Hill; Jonathan Sanger
- Starring: Daniel Beaty; Omari Hardwick; Loretta Devine; Selenis Leyva
- Cinematography: John Wakayama Carey
- Edited by: Joel Davenport
- Music by: Charles Mack
- Production companies: The Bubble Factory; Harlem Film Company
- Distributed by: Paladin
- Release date: June 11, 2016 (Hartford Public Library)
- Running time: 97 minutes
- Country: United States
- Language: English

Chapter & Verse is a 2016 American drama film directed by Jamal Joseph and starring Daniel Beaty, Omari Hardwick, Loretta Devine and Selenis Leyva. Antoine Fuqua served as an executive producer of the film.

== Cast ==
- Daniel Beaty
- Loretta Devine
- Omari Hardwick
- Selenis Leyva
- Marc John Jefferies
- Khadim Diop
- Justin Martin
- Muhammad Cunningham
- Gary Perez
- Bryonn Bain

== Release ==
The film premiered at the Hartford Public Library on June 11, 2016. It was then released in theaters in New York City, Los Angeles, Chicago and Atlanta in February 2017.

== Reception ==
The film has an 88% rating on Rotten Tomatoes.

Glenn Kenny writes in a review for The New York Times, "The movie's wide-screen framing, ruthless plot reversals and say-what-you-mean writing sometimes recall a master of socially conscious cinema from another era, Sam Fuller. But this is a picture with its own strong voice."

In a review for the Los Angeles Times Michael Rechtshaffen writes, "Filmmaker and Columbia professor Joseph, and playwright Beaty, in his feature writing and acting debut, infuse the movie with an intense New York City realism and an evocative street poetry that conjure up early John Cassavetes and Spike Lee. But ultimately, it’s the voice of Baldwin, who more than 50 years ago observed, “All over Harlem, Negro boys and girls are growing into stunted maturity, trying desperately to find a place to stand,” that rings out clearly in this deeply affecting drama."

Nick Schager of Variety gave the film a positive review and wrote: "...despite its familiarity, Chapter & Verse manages to make its material both fresh and authentic."

Frank Scheck of The Hollywood Reporter also gave the film a positive review and wrote: "Resonating with an authenticity borne of the experiences of its director/co-screenwriter Jamal Joseph, Chapter & Verse movingly portrays the plight of a recently released ex-con striving to make a new life for himself on the mean streets of Harlem."
