= Phyllis Yvonne Stickney =

American actress and comedian

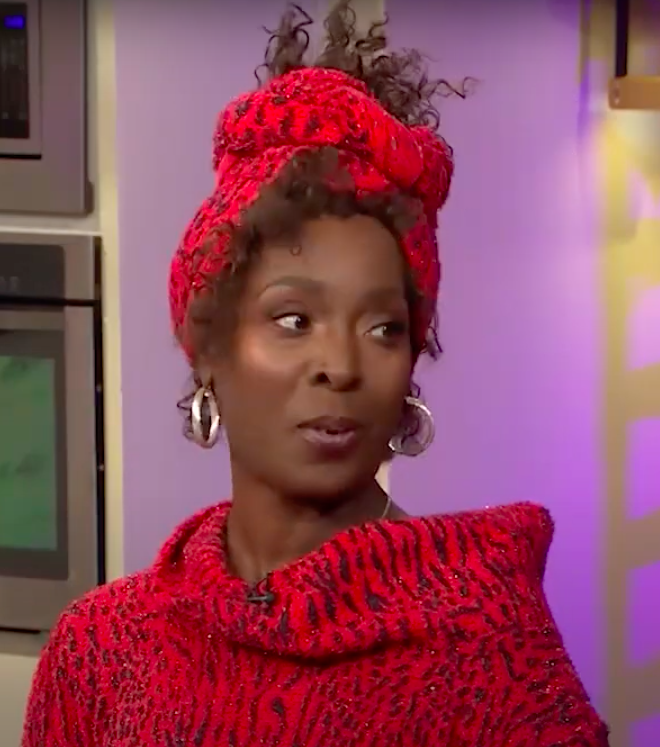
- Born: October 1, 1957 (age 68); Little Rock, Arkansas, U.S.
- Occupations: Actress; comedian; poet; playwright; producer; motivational speaker
- Years active: 1985–present

Phyllis Yvonne Stickney (born October 1, 1957) is an American actress and comedian. Stickney is known for her main role on the sitcom New Attitude (1990). She also has appeared in films including New Jack City (1991), Jungle Fever (1991), Malcolm X (1992), What's Love Got to Do with It (1993) and How Stella Got Her Groove Back (1998).

== Early life and education ==
Stickney was born and raised in Little Rock, Arkansas and is one of five siblings. She left home when she was 16 years old, moving to Los Angeles. She obtained a job with a management company by saying that she was 23. After two years there she moved to New York, where she attended video school and film school.

She initially worked at the University of Delaware as an associate in the theater department, and later studied at the Institute of New Cinema Artists.

== Career ==
Early in Stickney's career, she became involved with the New Heritage Theatre in Harlem, where she met Roger Furman, Ruby Dee and Ossie Davis. At one point, Dave Chappelle was her opener at the comedy venue Caroline's.

Stickney's performance in Tartuffe won an AUDELCO award in 1983.

== Acting credits ==
=== Film ===
Year	Title	Role	Notes
1985	Frederick Douglass: An American Life	Anna Douglass	Short
1991	New Jack City	Prosecuting Attorney Hawkins	
1991	Jungle Fever	Nilda	
1991	Talkin' Dirty After Dark	Aretha	
1992	Malcolm X	Honey	
1993	What's Love Got to Do with It	Alline Bullock	
1994	The Inkwell	Dr. Wade	
1995	My Teacher's Wife	Harvard Officer	
1995	Die Hard with a Vengeance	Wanda Shepard	
1996	Tendrils	-	Short
1998	How Stella Got Her Groove Back	Mrs. Shakespeare	
2002	Big Ain't Bad	Lauren Jordan	
2009	See Dick Run	Dr. LaCroix	
2010	Trapped: Haitian Nights	Ms. Edna	
2013	Haitian Nights	Ms. Edna	
2014	Gun Hill	Marva Stevens	TV movie
2014	Pound of Flesh	Mrs. Emeka	
2016	The Tale of Four	Saffronia's Mother	Short
2017	Dana's Story	Grandma Ladoux	Short

=== Television ===
Year	Title	Role	Notes
1987	The Cosby Show	Phyllis	Episode: "Hillman"
1989	The Women of Brewster Place	Cora Lee	Episode: "Part I & II"
1990	New Attitude	Yvonne St. James	Main Cast
1991	Great Performances	Topsy Washington	Episode: "The Colored Museum"
1993	Law & Order	Miss Lee	Episode: "Mother Love"
1994	New York Undercover	Baptise	Episode: "After Shakespeare"
1996	New York Undercover	Esther Rashad	Episode: "The Reckoning"
1996	ABC Afterschool Specials	Aunt Zed	Episode: "Daddy's Girl"
1999–2000	Linc's	Y'vetta	Recurring Cast: Season 2
2008	Sex Chronicles	Tracy	Episode: "Room 69"
2009	Glenn Martin, DDS	(voice)	Episode: "From Here to Fraternity"
2021	Shameless	Bev	Episode: "DNR"
2022	The Ms. Pat Show	Aunt Gwen	Episode: "Ding-Dong, The Bitch is Dead"

=== Theater ===
Year	Title	Role	Notes
2021	A Raisin in the Sun	Mama Lena	Production directed by Rajendra Maharaj
2022	School Girls; Or, the African Mean Girls Play	Headmistress	
2022	Laughter & Lyrics	Herself	
