= Black Theatre Alliance =

Defunct theater company federation in New York City

The Black Theatre Alliance (BTA) was a federation of African American theater companies in New York City that was founded in 1971 by playwrights Delano Stewart, Hazel Bryant, and Roger Furman. Duane Jones was executive director from 1976 to 1981. The organization sought to provide institutional support and resources to independent artists and touring companies. As one of seven subcontractors for the Cultural Council Foundation CETA Artist Project, which ran from 1978 to 1980, the Alliance was able to hire 35 actors, directors and playwrights, and mount performances throughout the city. The BTA had a national membership of over sixty black theater and dance companies before being reported as defunct in 1984.

The Black Theatre Alliance published the Black Theatre Resources Directory, which provided listings of theaters and services for playwrights, technicians and other industry professionals. It also sponsored an annual Black Theater Alliance Festival that took place at the Brooklyn Academy of Music.

Archival material relating to the organization's activities are contained in the Helen Armstead-Johnson Miscellaneous Theater Collections, 1818–1993, in the Manuscripts, Archives, and Rare Books Division, Schomburg Center for Research in Black Culture, New York Public Library. Additional information can be found in the Archives of the City of New York.
