= Bebe Drake =

American actress

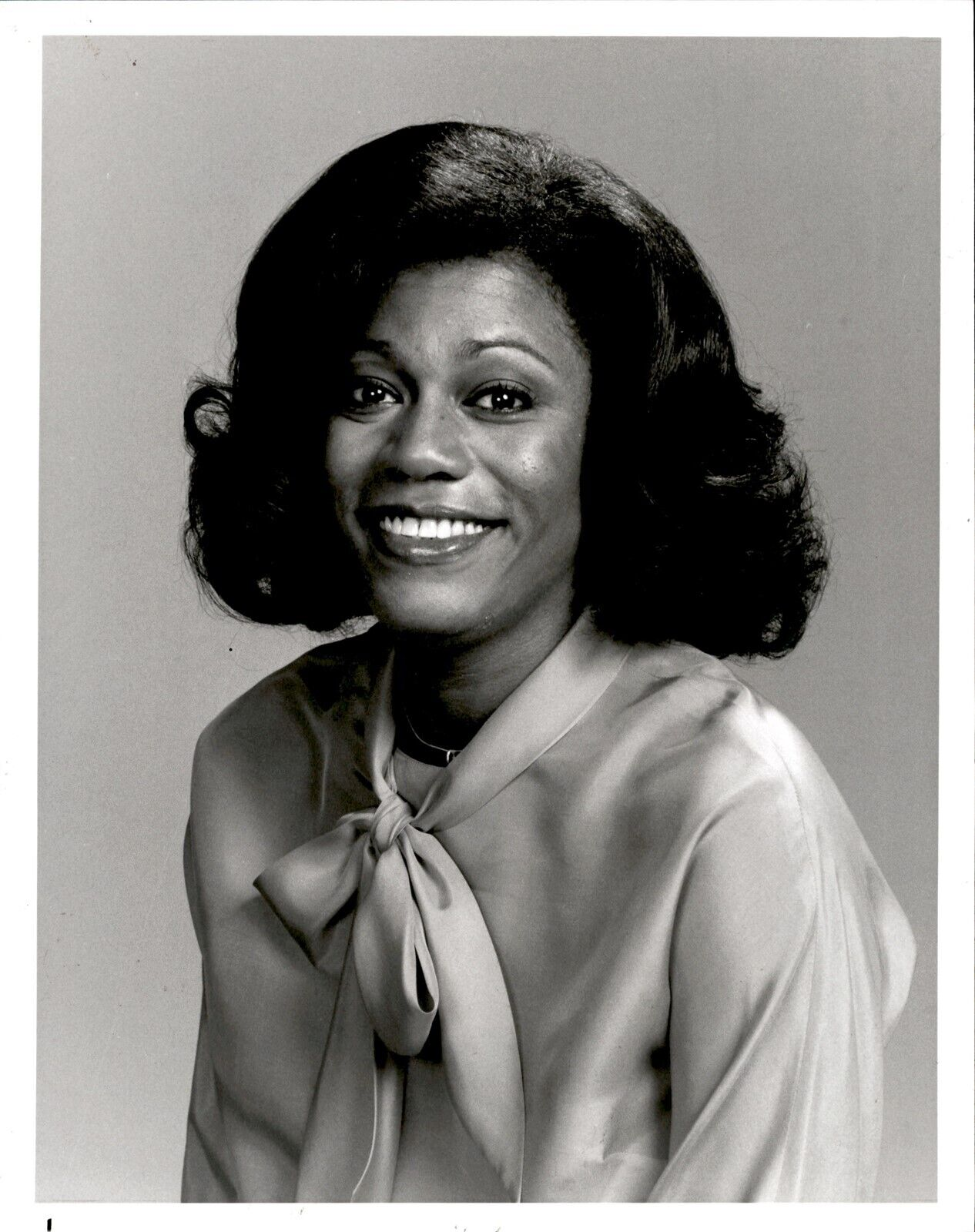
- Drake in Sanford Arms (1977)
- Born: Beatrice Drake; September 28, 1940 (age 85); Baltimore, Maryland, U.S.
- Other names: Bebe Drake Hooks; Bebe Drake Massey
- Occupation: Actress
- Years active: 1975–present

Beatrice "Bebe" Drake (born September 28, 1940) is an American actress. She has appeared in over 70 films and television series.

== Early life ==
Bebe Drake was born on September 28, 1940, in Baltimore, Maryland. Drake is one of four children born to Beatrice Lillian Hayes, a teacher, social worker and community activist, and Carl Everett Drake, a postal worker who later became the first African American practicing psychiatrist in Sacramento. She attended C. K. McClatchy High School, Sacramento City College, and California State University, Sacramento.

== Career ==
Drake made her Broadway debut in the 1975 Leslie Lee's play The First Breeze of Summer and the following year appeared in Great Performances production. She later was regular cast member on the two short-lived sitcoms: Snip (1976) and Sanford Arms (1977).

During her career, Drake appeared in more than 70 films and television series. She made her big screen debut in 1975 appearing in films Report to the Commissioner and Friday Foster, and in 1977 had supporting role opposite Richard Pryor in the comedy film Which Way Is Up?. In 1979 she co-starred in the miniseries Backstairs at the White House and the made-for-television movie The Cracker Factory. She made guest-starring appearances on television series such as Good Times, Welcome Back, Kotter, The Love Boat, The Jeffersons, Highway to Heaven, Thirtysomething, L.A. Law, The Jamie Foxx Show, The Steve Harvey Show, The Parent 'Hood, The Bernie Mac Show, and Martin.

Drake appeared in films such as The Last Married Couple in America (1980), Xanadu (1980), Oh, God! Book II (1980), First Monday in October (1981), Jo Jo Dancer, Your Life Is Calling (1986), Alien Nation (1988), House Party (1990), Across the Tracks (1991), Boomerang (1992), Jason's Lyric (1994), Space Jam (1996), How to Be a Player (1997), Anywhere But Here (1999), Leprechaun in the Hood (2000), Friday After Next (2002), Wild Hogs (2007) and Influence (2020).

Drake appeared in the 1980 made-for-television drama Scared Straight! Another Story, the 1987 thriller Billionaire Boys Club, and the 1989 miniseries The Women of Brewster Place She was regular cast member in the 1990 short-lived sitcom New Attitude. From 1989 to 1993, she had recurring role on A Different World playing Velma Gaines and later had recurring roles on Martin and Another Period playing Harriet Tubman.
