= Knock Knock: My Dad's Dream for Me =

2013 picture book by Daniel Beaty

- 1st edition cover
- Author: Daniel Beaty
- Illustrator: Bryan Collier
- Publisher: Little, Brown Books for Young Readers
- Publication date: December 17, 2013
- ISBN: 978-0-316-20917-5

Knock Knock: My Dad’s Dream for Me is a 2013 children’s picture book written by Daniel Beaty and illustrated by Bryan Collier. Published by Little, Brown and Company, the book follows a young African American boy as he copes with his father's absence. Knock Knock has been the subject of scholarship, especially regarding its use in educational settings. The book received critical acclaim for its storytelling and emotional depth and has been recognised with several awards, including a Coretta Scott King Illustrator Award.

== Background ==
Knock Knock is Beaty's debut children's book. Prior to its publication, Beaty described himself as a storyteller and worked as a poet, performer, and actor. The book is adapted from one of his autobiographical spoken-word poems, which drew Collier's attention after a performance circulated online. Collier was struck by the poem's emotional drive and sought to connect the message with millions of children who could relate to the topic. Collier introduced both Beaty and his poem to Alvina Ling, Editor-in-Chief at Little, Brown Books for Young Readers.

The original poem was based on Beaty’s childhood experience with familial incarceration. Beaty’s father, his primary caregiver, struggled with drug addiction and was incarcerated when Beaty was three years old. In adapting the story into a children’s book, Beaty broadened the narrative and omitted the specific reason for the father’s absence. He stated that, since abandonment for any reason evokes similar emotions, this choice was intended to allow a wider range of readers to identify with the story and its themes of resilience.

== Publication ==
Knock Knock: My Dad’s Dream for Me was published in December 2013 by Little, Brown for Young Readers. The book is intended for preschool through second-grade readers.

== Synopsis ==
The book opens with a knock-knock game between a young boy and his father. Every morning, the father knocks on his son’s bedroom door, attempting to wake him. The boy pretends to sleep until his father approaches his bed. Then, the boy jumps into his father’s arms. One day, his father never knocks. The boy processes this absence by writing a letter expressing his love and need for his father. Months later, he receives a response. His father tells him that he will never return, offers guidance, and encourages his son to achieve greatness: “Knock Knock down the doors that I could not” (p. 30). The father’s words overlay illustrations depicting the child becoming a man and a father himself.

== Illustrations ==
Collier’s illustrations feature watercolor and collage on 400-pound watercolor paper. He uses color to reflect the emotional mood with warm greens and blues fading to dull gray. After the father’s absence, Collier notes, “In the boy’s world you’ll notice that the sky is not as blue as it could be and the buildings all around are leaning and decaying, symbolizing that the boy’s world is crumbling around him, falling apart.” He also uses his illustrations to emphasize the text’s universality; as the boy floats above the ground, he is accompanied by faces etched into rooftops, reminding him that he is never alone and parental absence is not an isolated event.

The illustrations incorporate recurring motifs. In the boy’s room, a rainbow wallpaper decal falls when the father leaves. Elephants marching along the walls symbolize memory, and the father’s hat becomes a visual reminder of his presence. Urban decay represents the disintegration of the family unit, and the boy’s surroundings are only rebuilt once he establishes a loving family of his own. The closing image depicts the boy, now a grown man, hugging his father. The father is surrounded by a holographic outline, allowing readers to determine whether the father-son embrace is real or imagined.

== Analysis ==
=== Themes ===
Scholars have analyzed the protagonist's agency and character growth. When the protagonist imagines himself in flight, Melissa Jenkins, an English professor at Wake Forest University, interprets him as aspiring to transcend the burdens of poverty and parental absence. She argues that in African American literature, flight symbolizes activism rather than escapism; children's flight offers the broader perspective needed to create reform. Torri Shantal Bryant, a 2022 Ed.D candidate at East Texas A&M, also analyzes the protagonist’s agency, characterizing him as demonstrating high self-efficacy. In her study of multicultural picture books, Bryant identifies the character’s successful progression into adulthood and fatherhood as evidence of resilience despite early adversity.

=== Representation and cultural context ===
Scholars have also examined the book’s portrayal of race. The protagonist is an African American child, a depiction that is especially important given that this group has historically been underrepresented in children’s literature, either omitted or portrayed in derogatory ways. Tamara Robison, a 2022 Ed.D. candidate at East Texas A&M, argues that African American characters and multicultural literature teach students of color that they are valued and have a place in the world. Since Knock Knock’s author and protagonist share the same race and gender, Beaty can provide a genuine, culturally authentic account, strengthening the book’s racial representation. At the same time, Rhiannon Maton and colleagues writing for the Journal of Children's Literature, warn that, though underrepresented in children’s literature writ large, Black characters are overrepresented in picture books about incarceration. This disproportionate depiction may perpetuate discriminatory stereotypes.

== Pedagogical approaches ==
=== Rationale ===
Scholars have identified Knock Knock as a useful text in the classroom. By presenting a nonstereotypical family structure, scholars suggest the book counters bias and exposes students to a broader understanding of the family. The book recognizes a wider range of lived experiences, promotes inclusion, and creates windows and mirrors for students. Researchers have also noted its potential to reduce shame and stigma surrounding parental incarceration, supporting students through emotionally challenging situations. Incorporating Knock Knock into classrooms can help foster a safe, inclusive environment for children who may be embarrassed or self-conscious about their connection to the criminal system.

Knock Knock can also support educators, aiding them in providing informed care and instruction. Denise Esposto, an educator and 2023 Ed.D candidate at the University of Pittsburgh, found that early childhood educators in Pittsburgh lacked skills for recognising and addressing their students’ mental health. Responding to this inadequacy, she suggests Knock Knock as a resource for both teachers and students, providing scaffolding for conversations surrounding the trauma and experience of familial incarceration.

=== Strategies ===
Writing for The Reading Teacher Lisa Ciecierski and William Bints highlight how Knock Knock can support a student’s education in language arts, helping them develop inference skills, especially when taught in tandem with connected texts per Common Core standards. Kathryn Whitmore and fellow professors classify Knock Knock as a challenging text, one that grapples with uncommon topics, in an article published by the National Council of Teachers of English, United States. They recommend it to be taught through multimodal cordels, a practice inspired by Brazil street vendors where narrative is hung on a string to garner audience engagement with a text. For Knock Knock they describe a cordel that strings Collier's illustrations, statistics on systemic racism and incarceration, and symbolic artefacts, like a tie, throughout the classroom. This multimodal cordel encourages students to walk throughout the classroom, absorbing the text's significance. By incorporating physical activity and different media stimuli, cordels help make texts more accessible and meaningful for students.

== Reception ==
Reviews of Knock Knock have emphasized its emotional impact and cross-generational appeal. Glenda Carpio, writing in The New York Times, described the work as “a story of bereavement” that is also “a story of possibility and beauty,” adding that its intimacy and lyricism reflect W.H Auden’s observation that “‘there are no good books which are only for children.’” This interpretation is echoed by Darius Phelps, a poet, writer, and former elementary school teacher, who encountered Knock Knock as an adult and reported that the text resonated with his experience of grief following his grandfather’s death. Reading a book that reflected his family structure, Phelps said, “That’s when the feelings just started coming out.” Similar reactions were documented in the Louisiana Storybook Research Project, where scholars Tori Flint, Eliza Butler, and Ana Christiana da Silva Iddings read the book to incarcerated fathers and published their reactions in the National Council of Teachers of English, United States. One father, Reggie, “broke the silence and quietly said, “It’s us.” The others nodded in agreement, swiftly wiping away the beginnings of tears.”

Though Knock Knock has been praised by critics and readers, it was also included in the Journal of Intellectual Freedom and Privacy’s Winter 2021 Targets of the Censor report.

=== Awards ===
- 2014 Boston Globe-Horn Book: Honor Awards for Picture Books
- 2014 Notable Children’s Books in the Language Arts
- 2014 Coretta Scott King Illustrator Award
