= Jazz for Peace =

- Founded: 2002 by Rick DellaRatta in the United States
- Type: Non-profit; Jazz music group
- Location: Based in New York, NY
- Services: Music education, benefit concerts, and fundraising
- Fields: Promoting cooperation, nonviolence, and music education through jazz performance
- Website: www.jazzforpeace.org

Jazz for Peace is an American professional jazz organization with the goal of promoting unity and peace across cultures through the performance of music. They also seek to increase arts and music education in schools. Its motto is "Uniting People Through the Artform of Jazz". The organization was founded by jazz pianist and vocalist Rick DellaRatta.

== Background ==
Following the 9/11 terrorist attacks, DellaRatta wrote a poem he called "Jazz for Peace" as an outlet for his emotions. Shortly thereafter, DellaRatta formed a musical group under the same name. In October 2001, DellaRatta, saxophonist Paquito D'Rivera, bassist Eddie Gómez, and drummer Lenny White performed the first Jazz for Peace Concert in Troy Music Hall in New York. The concert scored positive reviews and led to further performances.

On 25 September 2002 Jazz for Peace earned national attention for their concert at the United Nations. This concert united Israeli, Palestinian, and American jazz musicians to perform in front of an international audience at the UN.

In May 2009, Jazz for Peace partnered with UNICEF to perform a jazz benefit concert in Rwanda. This appearance marked the first time Jazz for Peace performed in Africa. Their show was also the first time that an international jazz band performed with local musicians in Rwanda. The group performed two concerts in Kigali, the capital of Rwanda.

== Education series ==
In addition to raising funds for social causes, Jazz for Peace seeks to provide educational performances in schools across the United States. Their mission is to expose young people to the art form of jazz and promote the continuation and expansion of music and arts education in schools.

The education series is also seeking to raise funds to collect, repair and replace used instruments to donate to schools in need of musical instruments.

== Reviews and supporters ==
The organization has received praise and contributions from celebrities and politicians alike. Sen. John McCain, Ed Begley, Jr., Noam Chomsky, and Mayor Michael Bloomberg have all supported the organization's efforts. Jazz for Peace awarded Rep. Dennis Kucinich with their Honorary Ambassador Award for his exceptional support of the organization's efforts.

In November 2009, the organization partnered with the American Red Cross. A Red Cross spokesman said that the partnership with Jazz for Peace will allow "the community to experience world-class music, while raising much-needed funds."
