= Kwesi Armah =

Ghanaian politician and diplomat (1929–2006)

- Armah in April 1963.

Ghana High Commissioner to United Kingdom
- In office 1962–1965
- President: Kwame Nkrumah
- Preceded by: Edward Asafu-Adjaye

Minister for Overseas Trade
- In office 1965–1966
- President: Kwame Nkrumah

Personal details
- Born: 21 September 1929
- Died: 24 November 2006 (aged 77) Accra
- Party: Convention People's Party
- Other political affiliations: People's National Party
- Spouse: Esther Yaa Agyemang Armah
- Children: Esther Armah

Kwesi Armah (21 September 1929 – 24 November 2006) was a Ghanaian politician and diplomat. He was the High Commissioner (Ambassador) to the Court of St. James in London, England, and the Minister of Foreign Trade in the administration of Kwame Nkrumah before the military coup of 1966. He later served in the Council of State in the government of John Kufuor.

== Role in the Vietnam War ==
While he was High Commissioner, Armah led a delegation of diplomats sent by Nkrumah to Vietnam in 1965 to establish ties to the government in Hanoi following the rejection of a Commonwealth Peace Mission proposed earlier that year. That mission ended with President Ho Chi Minh personally thanking the delegation and Nkrumah for their concern, but still rejected the proposed mission as an American-driven "negotiated settlement" that was "fraudulent and sinister".

Despite this rejection, Nkrumah was determined to play a part in the conflict, and in February 1966 led another delegation with Armah to Vietnam. During this mission, however, military forces within Ghana instigated a coup d'état while the leaders were away. Armah was effectively exiled from Ghana, while his family was targeted by military forces and placed under house arrest. Armah was also targeted for extradition to Ghana on his return to London, ostensibly for misappropriation of £30,000 of government funds. Home Secretary for the United Kingdom Roy Jenkins determined that the charges were brought by Ghana for political crimes, and thus chose to decline the extradition request under the Fugitive Offenders Act. Although freed, he was tried at the Old Bailey and subsequently acquitted. Armah was separated from his family for two years, when they too were released from house arrest and allowed to return to their home in England.

=== Leadership and coup ===
Nkrumaist political parties were not permitted again until the establishment of the Third Republic of Ghana, allowed by Jerry Rawlings, who had led the Armed Forces Revolutionary Council (AFRC) in a June 1979 coup. Armah became a leader of the People's National Party (PNP) that rose to power in the republic's first—and only—election that brought Hilla Limann to the presidency. Two years later, yet another coup led by Jerry Rawlings overthrew the Limann government. Rawlings established the Provisional National Defence Council (PNDC), which oversaw a system of Public Tribunals that would not be "fettered by legal technicalities". Along with two other leaders of the PNP, Armah was charged and convicted of corruption, namely the bribery of former AFRC officers, and served seven years in prison. He was placed in administrative detention once more in 1991 "in the interest of national security" after writing an article in the Ghanaian newspaper Christian Chronicle critical of the ruling PNDC. He was not brought to trial until three months later.

== Death ==
Kwesi Armah died on 24 November 2006 in Accra. He was married and had five children, including the writer and analyst Esther Armah.

== Publications ==
- Africa's Golden Road, Heinemann Educational Books, 1965
- Ghana: Nkrumah's Legacy, London: Rex Collings, 1974
- Peace without Power: Ghana's Foreign Policy 1957-1966, Ghana Universities Press, 2004. ISBN 978-9964303006

Diplomatic posts
Preceded by Edward Asafu-Adjaye	High Commissioner to United Kingdom; 1962 – 65	Succeeded by ?
Political offices
Preceded by ?	Minister for Overseas Trade; 1965 – 66	dissolved
