= The Black Book (Morrison book) =

1974 non-fiction book by Toni Morrison

- Author: Various
- Language: English
- Subject: African-American history
- Publication date: 1974; 52 years ago
- Publication place: United States
- Media type: Print
- Pages: 198
- ISBN: 0394706226
- OCLC: 640804

The Black Book is a collage-like book compiled by Toni Morrison and published by Random House in 1974, which explores the history and experience of African Americans in the United States through various historic documents, facsimiles, artwork, obituaries, advertisements, patent applications, photographs, sheet music, and more.

As Hilton Als has noted, "[Morrison] wanted the largely visual work to be a kind of scrapbook, or panorama, of Black American life, largely free of language and thus cant, and valuable to the young. 'I was afraid that young people would come to believe that black history began in 1964,' she told an interviewer. 'Or that there was slavery, there was a gap, and then there was 1964.'"

The book was co-edited by Roger Furman, Middleton A. Harris, Morris Levitt, and Ernest Smith, and features an introduction by Bill Cosby. Toni Morrison, who was then an editor at Random House, was The Black Book's uncredited compiler, and a poem by her appeared on the book's slipcover. Morrison said it was important to include documents such as patents to demonstrate that African Americans were "busy, smart and not just minstrelized".

== Awards and legacy ==
The Black Book was nominated for a 1975 National Book Award, and received an award from the American Institute of Graphic Arts.

In 2009, Random House published a 35th-anniversary edition of The Black Book, containing Morrison's poem as the preface.
