= New Attitude (TV series) =

American sitcom

- Genre: Sitcom
- Based on: Beauty Shop by Shelly Garrett
- Developed by: Jack Elinson; Maiya Williams; Tom Straw; Ralph Farquhar
- Written by: Jack Elinson; Ralph R. Farquhar; Maiya Williams; Tom Straw
- Directed by: Oz Scott
- Starring: Sheryl Lee Ralph; Phyllis Yvonne Stickney; Karen Bankhead; Bebe Drake-Massey; Morris Day
- Opening theme: "New Attitude" performed by Sheryl Lee Ralph
- Composer: Kurt Farquhar
- Country of origin: United States
- Original language: English
- No. of seasons: 1
- No. of episodes: 8 (2 unaired)

Production
- Executive producers: Bill Boulware; Jack Elinson; Doug McHenry
- Producers: Clarence Avant; Ron Bloomberg; George E. Crosby; Al Gordon; George Jackson
- Running time: 30 minutes
- Production companies: Doug McHenry Film; Grio Entertainment Group; Castle Rock Entertainment

Original release
- Network: ABC
- Release: August 8 – September 7, 1990

New Attitude is an American sitcom that aired on ABC from August 8 to September 7, 1990. Based on the play Beauty Shop by Shelly Garrett, the series aired for six episodes during ABC's TGIF lineup on Fridays.

== Synopsis ==
The St. James sisters had sunk everything they could beg or borrow into their new business venture, "New Attitude" beauty salon. The partnership was 50-50: outrageous, try-anything Yvonne (Phyllis Yvonne Stickney) got them into trouble, and conservative, sensible Vicki (Sheryl Lee Ralph) got them out. Lamarr (Morris Day) is their colorful top hairdresser, the "prince of perms"; Taylor (Karen Bankhead), the ambitious but inept receptionist (she had flunked the beautician's exam 11 times); and Leon (Earl Billings), the landlord.

New Attitude aired a total of six episodes (eight were produced) before being canceled by ABC in September 1990.

== Cast ==
- Sheryl Lee Ralph as Vicki St. James
- Phyllis Yvonne Stickney as Yvonne St. James
- Karen Bankhead as Taylor
- Bebe Drake-Massey as BeBe
- Morris Day as Lamarr
- Larenz Tate as Chilly D.

== Episodes ==
No.	Title	Directed by	Written by	Original release date
1	"Pilot"	Oz Scott	Maiya Williams	August 8, 1990
2	"I'm Not a Crook"	Oz Scott	Maiya Williams	August 10, 1990
3	"The Case of the Missing Toupee"	Oz Scott	Pam Veasey	August 17, 1990
4	"Not Your Average Date"	Oz Scott	Peter Callay	August 24, 1990
5	"Advertise"	Oz Scott	Bill Boulware, Al Gordon	August 31, 1990
6	"A Star is Born"	Oz Scott	Sara Finney Johnson, Vida Spears	September 7, 1990
7	"Who's Bachin' Who?"	Oz Scott	TBD	Unaired
8	"Beauty School"	Oz Scott	TBD	Unaired

== Bibliography ==
- Tim Brooks and Earle Marsh, The Complete Directory to Prime Time Network and Cable TV Shows 1946–Present, Ninth edition (New York: Ballantine Books, 2007) ISBN 978-0-345-49773-4
