= Tupac Shakur Legacy =

2006 biography by Jamal Joseph

- Tupac Shakur Legacy book cover
- Author: Jamal Joseph
- Language: English
- Genre: Biography
- Publisher: Simon & Schuster
- Publication date: August 16, 2006
- Media type: Print (Hardcover)
- ISBN: 0-7432-9260-X
- OCLC: 138436160
- Dewey Decimal: 782.421649092 B 22
- LC Class: ML420.S529 J67 2006

Tupac Shakur Legacy is an official interactive biography of Tupac Shakur released on August 16, 2006. The author of the book is Jamal Joseph, a friend of the Shakur family, Shakur's godfather, and a former Black Panther Party member, now a professor of film at Columbia University. The book is published by Atria Books a division of Simon & Schuster. It features unseen family photographs, intimate stories, and over 20 removable reproductions of his handwritten song lyrics, contracts, scripts, poetry, and other personal papers.

The book includes a 60-minute interview CD with Tupac along with many reproductions. The reproductions include replicas of Tupac's personal notebooks, letters and written plans, along with directions to where Tupac's ashes were said to be spread.
