= Gabourey Sidibe =

American actress (born 1983)

- Sidibe in 2026
- Born: May 6, 1983 (age 43); New York City, U.S.
- Education: Borough of Manhattan Community College (AA)
- Occupation: Actress
- Years active: 2009–present
- Spouse: Brandon Frankel (m. 2021)
- Children: 2
- Mother: Alice Tan Ridley
- Relatives: Dorothy Pitman Hughes (aunt)
- Awards: Full list

Gabourey Sidibe (/ɡæˈbuˌreɪ sɪˈdiˌbeɪ/ gab-OO-ray sid-EE-bay; born May 6, 1983) is an American actress. She is known for starring in the drama film Precious (2009), which earned her a nomination for the Academy Award for Best Actress, making her the eighth black actress to be nominated in that category. She was also nominated for the BAFTA Award, Golden Globe Award, and Screen Actors Guild Award for Best Actress.

Sidibe has appeared in films such as the heist comedy Tower Heist (2011), the satirical drama Seven Psychopaths (2012), the romantic comedy Top Five (2014), and the thriller Antebellum (2020). Her television roles include the comedy drama The Big C (2010–2013), the anthology American Horror Story (2013–present), and the musical Empire (2015–2020). Outside of acting, Sidibe wrote the novel This Is Just My Face: Try Not to Stare and made her directorial debut with The Tale of Four, both released in 2017.

== Early life ==
Sidibe was born in New York City in the Bedford–Stuyvesant, Brooklyn neighborhood, and was raised in Harlem. Her mother, Alice Tan Ridley, was an American R&B and gospel singer who appeared on the fifth season of America's Got Talent, on June 15, 2010. Her father, Ibnou Sidibe, is from Senegal and is a cab driver. Growing up, Sidibe lived with her aunt, feminist activist Dorothy Pitman Hughes. She holds an associate degree from Borough of Manhattan Community College and attended but did not graduate from City College of New York and Mercy College. She was scheduled to attend for class at BMCC on September 11, 2001, but she woke up late to attend and she later became aware of the planes crash into the World Trade Center. She worked at The Fresh Air Fund's office as a receptionist before pursuing an acting career.

== Career ==
=== 2009–2015: Debut and breakthrough ===
Sidibe began acting in 2007; prior to her career, she was advised by Joan Cusack not to pursue the entertainment industry since "it's so image-conscious." She made her debut with Lee Daniels's drama film Precious. She plays the main character, Claireece "Precious" Jones, a 16-year-old mother of two (the result of Precious being raped by her father) who tries to escape abuse at the hands of her mother. The film won numerous awards, including two Academy Awards, a Golden Globe Award, and Sundance Film Festival Grand Jury Award. On December 15, 2009, she was nominated for a Golden Globe in the category of Best Performance by an Actress in a Motion Picture Drama for her performance in Precious. The next month she received an Academy Award nomination for Best Actress.

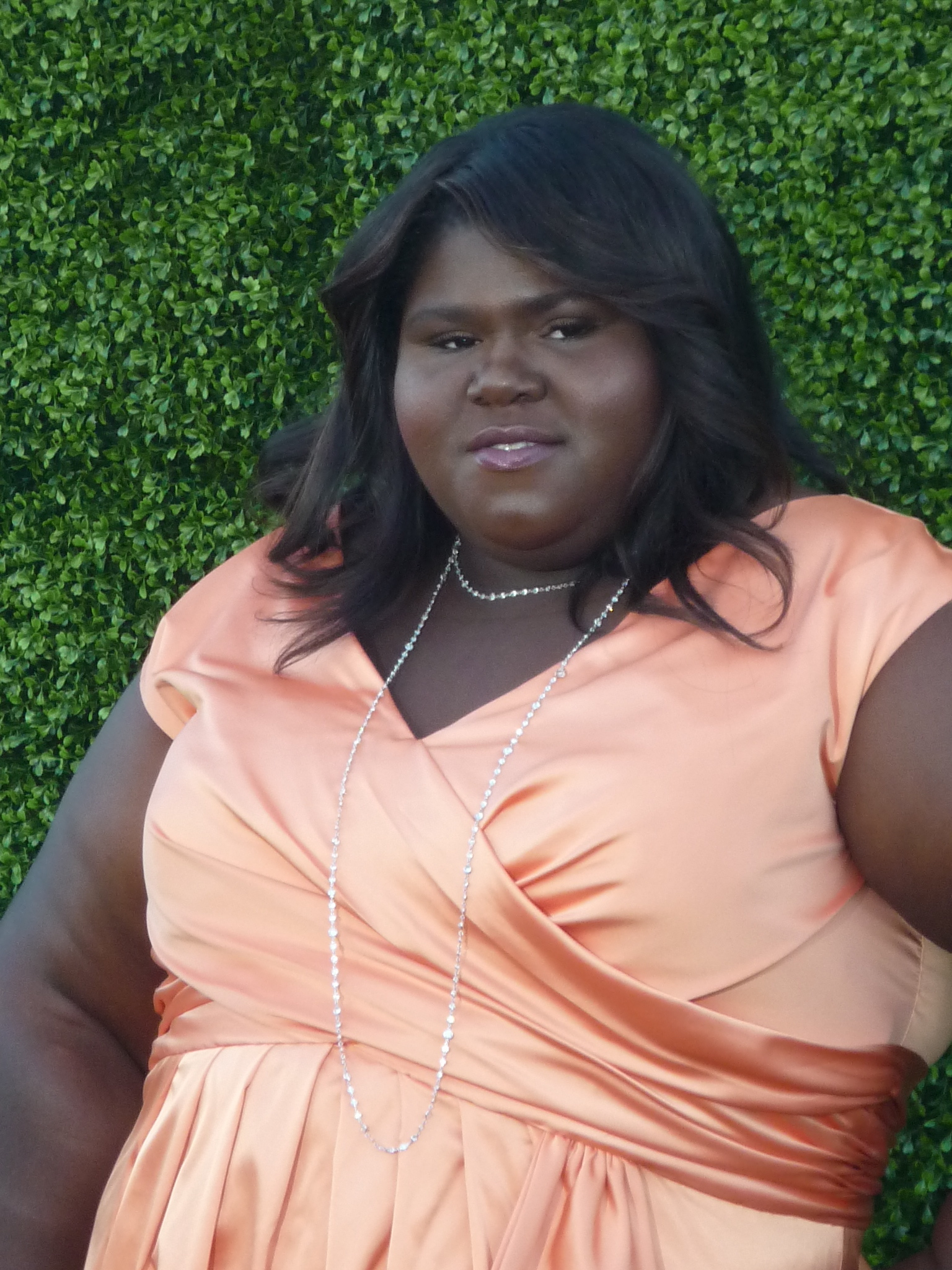
Sidibe in July 2010

Her next film was the Sundance Lab project Yelling to the Sky, directed by Victoria Mahoney and starring Zoë Kravitz, in which she played Latonya Williams, a bully. In 2011, Sidibe was in the film Tower Heist and voiced a character in "Hot Water", the first episode of season 7 of American Dad!. She appeared in the season 8 American Dad! episode "Stanny Tendergrass" early in 2013, and starred in the music video for "Don't Stop (Color on the Walls)" by the indie pop band Foster the People. Sidibe also appeared in the Showtime network series The Big C as Andrea Jackson.

By April 2013, Sidibe had joined the cast of American Horror Story season 3, portraying Queenie, a young witch. She returned to the series for its fourth season, American Horror Story: Freak Show as a secretarial school student, Regina Ross. From 2015, she stars in Lee Daniels' Fox musical series Empire as Becky Williams alongside Terrence Howard and Taraji P. Henson. Sidibe portrays the head of A&R in the Empire company. As of April 2015, Sidibe was promoted to a series regular in season 2. She also starred in the Hulu series Difficult People as Denise.

=== 2016–present: Memoir and current work ===
Sidibe's memoir, This Is Just My Face: Try Not to Stare, was released in 2017.

On January 6, 2016, Sidibe appeared in the penultimate episode of American Horror Story: Hotel, reprising her Coven role as Queenie, marking her third season in the series. After sitting out subsequent seasons Roanoke and Cult, Sidibe returned to American Horror Story in 2018, appearing once again as her character Queenie in its eighth season, Apocalypse.

In 2022, she appeared in the film All I Didn't Want for Christmas. In the same year she appeared as Jaslyn in an episode of the second season of American Horror Stories, a spin-off of American Horror Story in which each episode features a unique story.

In October 2025, Sidibe was confirmed to be returning for the thirteenth season of American Horror Story in 2026. This will mark her first season as part of the main cast.

Sidibe directed the 2026 drama/romance film Be Happy. It premiered on Lifetime on the 7th of February.

== Personal life ==
In March 2017, Sidibe revealed that she had been diagnosed with type 2 diabetes and underwent laparoscopic bariatric surgery in an effort to manage her weight.

In November 2020, Sidibe announced her engagement to Brandon Frankel, a talent manager with Cameo. The couple married in March 2021. In June 2024, she announced she had given birth to twins, one boy and one girl.

== Filmography ==
=== Film ===
Year	Title	Role	Notes
2009	Precious	Claireece Precious Jones	
2011	Yelling to the Sky	Latonya Williams	
2011	Tower Heist	Odessa Montero	
2012	Seven Psychopaths	Sharice	
2014	White Bird in a Blizzard	Beth	
2014	Life Partners	Jen	
2014	Top Five	Herself	
2015	Gravy	Winketta	
2016	Grimsby	Banu	
2017	The Tale of Four	—	Directorial debut
2019	Come as You Are	Sam	
2020	Antebellum	Dawn	
2021	Asking for It	Rudy	
2026	Be Happy	—	Director

=== Television ===
Year	Title	Role	Notes
2010	Saturday Night Live	Host	Episode: "Gabourey Sidibe/MGMT"
2010–2013	The Big C	Andrea Jackson	Main role
2011	Glenn Martin, DDS	Keisha	Voice, episode: "Date with Destiny"
2011	American Dad!	Herself	Episode: "Stanny Tendergrass"
2012	American Dad!	Party girl	Voice, episode: "Hot Water"
2013	Project Runway All Stars	Herself (guest judge)	Episode: "Keepin' It Classy"
2013–2014	American Horror Story: Coven	Queenie	12 episodes
2014	American Horror Story: Freak Show	Regina Ross	3 episodes
2015–2020	Empire	Becky Williams	Main role
2015–2017	Difficult People	Denise	Main role
2016	American Horror Story: Hotel	Queenie	Episode: "Battle Royale"
2016	Brad Neely's Harg Nallin' Sclopio Peepio	Various	Main role
2016	Drunk History	Ella Fitzgerald	Episode: "Legends"
2017	BoJack Horseman	Tamera	Voice, episode: "The Old Sugarman Place"
2017	Doc McStuffins	Hilary Mole	Voice, episode: "Toy Hospital: Mole Money, Mole Problems"
2018	American Horror Story: Apocalypse	Queenie	Recurring role; 5 episodes
2021	Santa Inc.	Goldie	Main role
2022	American Horror Stories	Jaslyn Taylor	Episode: "Aura"
2022	All I Didn't Want for Christmas	Emily Harris	Television film
2023	The Prank Panel	Herself	Host
2025	StuGo	Francis	Voice, main role
2025	Give Me Back My Daughter	Renee	Television film
2026	American Horror Story: 13	Queenie	Main role; 5 episodes

=== Video games ===
- High on Life (2023) – Mux

=== Music videos ===
- "Don't Stop (Color on the Walls)" (2011), by Foster the People
- "(I Wanna) Channing All Over Your Tatum" (2014), by Channing Tatum and Jamie Foxx

== Bibliography ==
- Sidibe, Gabourey (2017). This Is Just My Face: Try Not to Stare. Houghton Mifflin Harcourt. ISBN 978-0-544-78676-9.

== Accolades ==
Sidibe has been recognized by the Academy of Motion Picture Arts and Sciences for the following performances:

- 82nd Academy Awards: Best Actress, nomination, for Precious (2009)

Additionally, she has been nominated for a BAFTA Award, a Critics' Choice Award, a Golden Globe Award, and two Screen Actors Guild Awards.

== See also ==
- List of actors with Academy Award nominations
- List of black Academy Award winners and nominees
- List of black Golden Globe Award winners and nominees
