= Hazel Joan Bryant =

American actress, opera singer, director, and playwright

Hazel Joan Bryant (September 8, 1939 – November 7, 1983) was an American actress, opera singer, director, and playwright. She founded the Richard Allen Center for Culture and Art in 1969 and served as the executive director until 1983. Bryant died from a heart attack at her home in Manhattan at the age of 44, shortly after speaking at the United Nations.

== Education and training ==
Bryant studied and performed music at the Peabody Preparatory School of Music, the Oberlin Conservatory of Music, and the Mozarteum Orchestra Salzburg. Bryant received a degree in theater administration from the Columbia University School of the Arts.
