= Tower Heist =

2011 heist comedy film directed by Brett Ratner

- Theatrical release poster
- Directed by: Brett Ratner
- Screenplay by: Ted Griffin; Jeff Nathanson
- Story by: Bill Collage; Adam Cooper; Ted Griffin
- Produced by: Brian Grazer; Eddie Murphy; Kim Roth
- Starring: Ben Stiller; Eddie Murphy; Casey Affleck; Alan Alda; Matthew Broderick; Judd Hirsch; Téa Leoni; Michael Peña; Gabourey Sidibe
- Cinematography: Dante Spinotti
- Edited by: Mark Helfrich
- Music by: Christophe Beck
- Production companies: Imagine Entertainment; Relativity Media; Rat Entertainment
- Distributed by: Universal Pictures
- Release dates: October 24, 2011 (The Ziegfeld Theatre in New York City); November 4, 2011 (United States)
- Running time: 104 minutes
- Country: United States
- Language: English
- Budget: $75–85 million
- Box office: $152.9 million

Tower Heist is a 2011 American heist comedy film directed by Brett Ratner, written by Ted Griffin and Jeff Nathanson, based on a story by Bill Collage, Adam Cooper and Griffin and starring Ben Stiller and Eddie Murphy with Casey Affleck, Alan Alda, Matthew Broderick, Judd Hirsch, Téa Leoni, Michael Peña, and Gabourey Sidibe in supporting roles. The film marked one of Heavy D's final roles and the last to be released while he was still alive as he died on November 8, 2011, four days after its theatrical release.

The plot follows employees of an exclusive apartment building who lose their pensions in the Ponzi scheme of a Wall Street businessman and enlist the aid of a criminal, a bankrupt businessman, and an immigrant maid to break into his apartment and steal back their money while avoiding the FBI agents in charge of his case.

Tower Heist began development as early as 2005, based on an idea by Murphy that would star him and an all-black cast of comedians as a heist group who rob Trump International Hotel and Tower. As the script developed and changed into an Ocean's Eleven–style caper, Murphy left the project. Ratner continued to develop the idea into what would eventually become Tower Heist, with Murphy later rejoining the production. Filming took place entirely in New York City on a budget of $75 million (after tax rebates), with several buildings provided by Donald Trump used to represent the eponymous tower. The film's soundtrack album and musical score was composed by Christophe Beck and produced by Jake Monaco and was released on November 1, 2011, by Varèse Sarabande, Back Lot Music and Colosseum Records.

Prior to release, the film was involved in a controversy over plans by Universal Pictures to release it for home viewing on video on demand to 500,000 Comcast customers, only three weeks after its cinematic debut. Concern over the implementation's harming ticket sales and inspiring further films to follow suit resulted in several theater chains' refusal to show the film at all if the plan went ahead, forcing Universal to abandon the idea.

Tower Heist was theatrically released on November 4, 2011, in the United States by Universal Pictures. The film received mixed reviews from critics, with praise going to the cast, including Broderick, Leoni, and Stiller. Murphy's performance was repeatedly singled out, with critics feeling that he displayed a welcome return to the comedic style of his early career. Much of the criticism was focused on the plot, which was considered "formulaic", "rushed", "dull", and "laborious". (Note: Attributed to multiple references) The film failed to meet box-office expectations, earning only $152.9 million worldwide on a budget of $75–85 million.

== Plot ==
Josh Kovaks is the building manager of The Tower, an upscale apartment complex in New York City that has Wall Street billionaire Arthur Shaw as its penthouse tenant. Josh, friendly with Shaw, has asked him to manage the staff's pensions. One day, Shaw is placed under house arrest by the FBI for masterminding a Ponzi scheme, embezzling up to $2 billion.

Realizing they will lose their pensions, the staff members are distraught and the doorman Lester even attempts suicide. Josh, his brother-in-law and The Tower's concierge Charlie, and elevator operator Enrique are fired by general manager Mr. Simon after angrily confronting Shaw for his scheme. Claire Denham, the FBI agent in charge of the case, drunkenly suggests to Josh that Shaw has concealed $20 million as a reserve, and that he should steal it. Josh gets Charlie, Enrique, and evicted Tower tenant Mr. Fitzhugh to help him steal the money.

They supplement their inexperience by enlisting Josh's childhood friend Slide, a petty criminal, and The Tower's maid Odessa, who has locksmith experience. Denham informs Josh that Shaw is scheduled to attend court on Thanksgiving during the Macy's Thanksgiving Day Parade to avoid publicity. Josh and his team orchestrate this with a supposed call from the judge's clerk, so their plan to break into Shaw's apartment then is confirmed. Prior to this, Charlie is rehired as The Tower's new building manager. Uncomfortable with the plan, he warns Josh to abandon it or Charlie will turn him over to the police.

Slide attempts to betray the team by reaching the safe ahead of them and taking all of the money for himself, having tricked Odessa into giving him safe-cracking lessons. The team intercepts him at Shaw's apartment and breaks down a false wall, revealing Shaw's safe, which turns out to be empty. During the ensuing altercation, the group find gold underneath the paint of a Ferrari 250 GT Lusso which Shaw has displayed in his apartment, realizing that he invested his money in gold, turned it into car parts, and reassembled the car inside the apartment to hide the money in plain sight.

Fitzhugh estimates the car's value at $45 million. They then decide to lower it to Fitzhugh's old apartment using a window-washing platform. Charlie rejoins the team after realizing their presence and saves Fitzhugh from falling to his death. They push the car on top of one of the elevators, and Josh finds a ledger of Shaw's illegal finances in the car's glove compartment, detailing the latter's long history of fraud.

Shaw and the FBI return, realizing the Thanksgiving Day court date to be part of Josh's plan. Denham notes the missing car and Shaw's hidden safe, and forfeits Shaw's $10 million bail, remanding him into federal custody until his real court date for not informing the FBI of the safe even if it was empty. The FBI arrests Josh's conspirators (except Slide, who somehow manages to slip away) while Denham catches up to Josh in Central Park.

In the paddy wagon, Josh reveals to Shaw that he found the ledger. Shaw tries to negotiate a deal with them by giving them cash ten times the value of the gold car in exchange for their silence. Enrique reminds Shaw "we don't accept tips at The Tower".

At FBI headquarters, Denham mentions to Josh that they know about his friendship with Slide. Tower receptionist Miss Iovenko tells Director Mazin that she passed her bar exam three days before and will be Josh's attorney. She shows the FBI Shaw's ledger and tells them she will turn it over in exchange for everyone's freedom. Mazin accepts on the condition that Josh serves a minimal two-year sentence for masterminding the heist.

Slide leads the retrieval of the car from The Tower's swimming pool. Its various dismantled parts are sent to Tower employees to compensate for their lost pensions while splitting the remainder of the gold among themselves. Shaw is sentenced to life in prison after pleading guilty, while Josh enters his own cell with a satisfied smile slowly forming on his face.

== Cast ==
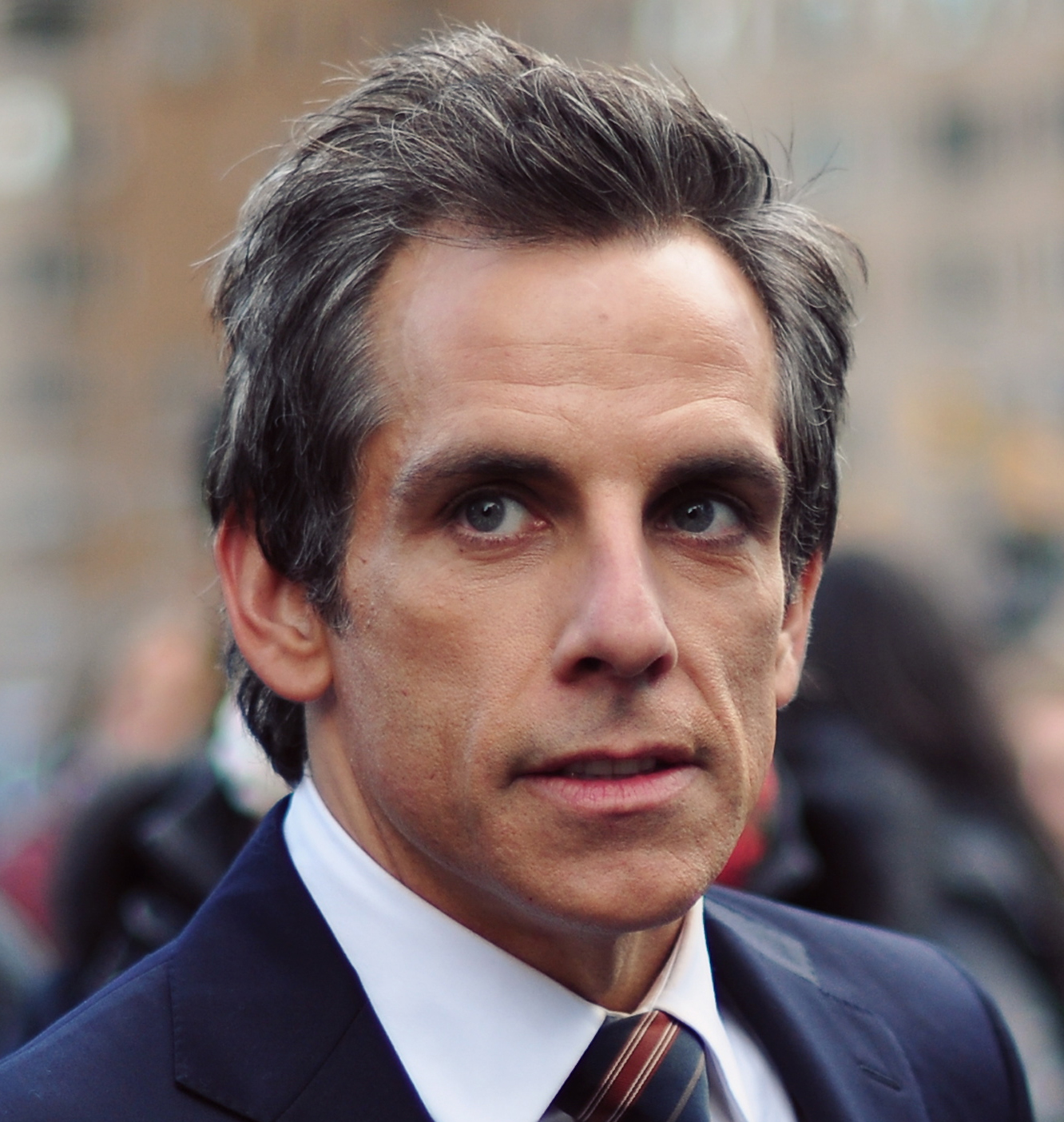
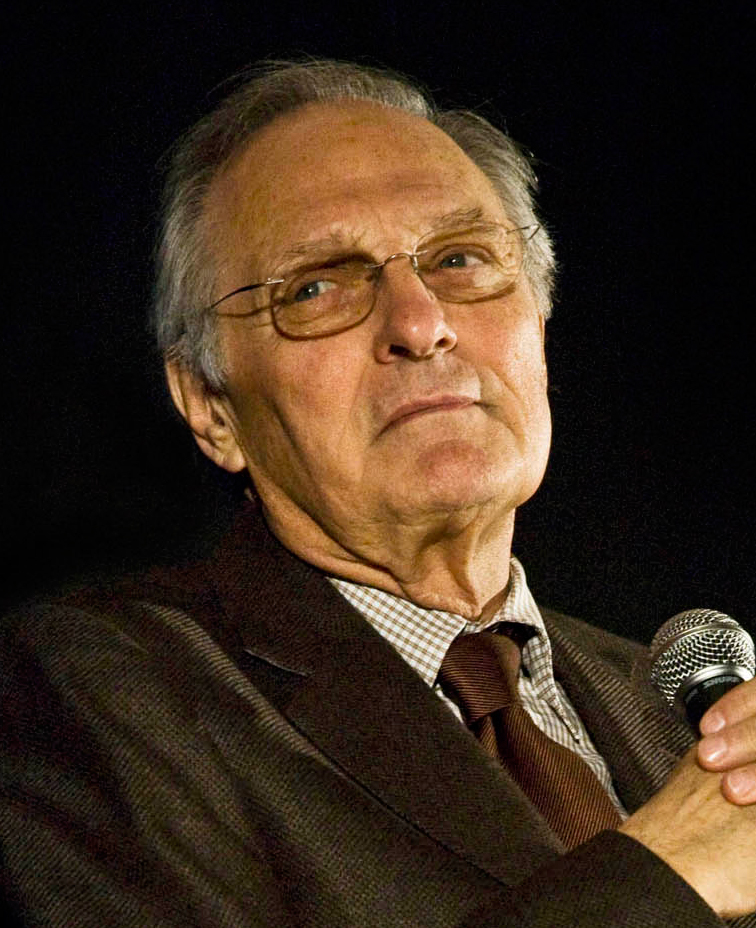
Top to bottom: Ben Stiller, Matthew Broderick, and Alan Alda star in the film.
- Ben Stiller as Josh Kovaks, the Tower's building manager.
- Eddie Murphy as Darnell "Slide" Davis, a petty crook and Josh's childhood friend to whom Josh turns for help.
- Casey Affleck as Charlie Gibbs, the Tower's concierge and Josh's brother-in-law.
- Alan Alda as Arthur Shaw, a Wall Street billionaire living at the Tower who was placed under house arrest for embezzling $2 billion and trying to flee the city with help from some men.
- Matthew Broderick as Mr. Fitzhugh, a bankrupt former Wall Street investor who aids Josh.
- Judd Hirsch as Mr. Simon, the Tower's general manager.
- Téa Leoni as Claire Denham, an FBI special agent assigned to Shaw's case and Josh's love interest.
- Michael Peña as Enrique Dev'reaux, the elevator operator and the newest employee of the Tower's staff.
- Gabourey Sidibe as Odessa Montero, a Jamaican-born maid at the Tower threatened with deportation by Shaw's theft.
- Stephen McKinley Henderson as Lester Day, the Tower's retiring doorman.
- Nina Arianda as Miss Iovenko, a receptionist at the Tower and lawyer-in-training.
- Marcia Jean Kurtz as Rose D'Amato, the personal assistant to Josh and Simon at the Tower.
- Juan Carlos Hernandez as Manuel, the Tower's head of security.
- Harry O'Reilly as FBI Special Agent Dansk, an FBI agent who guards the entrance to Shaw's apartment.
- James Colby as FBI Special Agent Huggins, an FBI agent working alongside Denham.
- Peter Van Wagner as Marty Klein, Shaw's attorney.
- Željko Ivanek as FBI Director Mazin, the head of the FBI's New York field office and Denham's boss.
- Robert Downey Sr. as Judge Ramos, a judge who resides in the Tower.
- Jessica Szohr as Sasha Kovaks-Gibbs, Charlie's pregnant wife and Josh's sister.
- Heavy D as a courthouse guard that informs Claire that Judge Hollingsworth is in Washington, D.C. visiting his daughter.
- Kate Upton as Mr. Hightower's mistress.

== Production ==
=== Development ===
The idea for Tower Heist began development as early as 2005, when Eddie Murphy pitched a concept to producer Brian Grazer and Brett Ratner concerning an all-star cast of black comedians including Chris Tucker, Kevin Hart, Dave Chappelle, Tracy Morgan, and Martin Lawrence, as a group of disgruntled employees who plan to rob Donald Trump and Trump International Hotel and Tower. The film was originally titled Trump Heist under this concept. A script was developed by Adam Cooper and Bill Collage and over the course of the next five years, the script was rewritten by several writers including Russell Gewirtz, Rawson Marshall Thurber, Ted Griffin, Leslie Dixon, Noah Baumbach, and Jeff Nathanson, with the bulk of the work – and credit – going to Griffin and Nathanson. On the development of the film, Grazer said "It's difficult to imagine that a casual conversation six years ago has grown into such a fully realized film that is so grand in scope. Plus, who could have known that, in this period of time, the global financial markets would teeter on the verge of collapse and the villain in our story would pale in comparison to some very real ones on Wall Street? Truth remains stranger than fiction."

Rewrites of the script gradually moved away from the ensemble of comedians and began to focus on two central characters, at which point Murphy left the project. The modified script reminded Ratner of the Ocean's Eleven remake, a project he had developed but for which he was unavailable due to his commitment to directing Rush Hour 2. The project remained in development for a period of years but Ratner remained committed to the project, having enjoyed the heist films of the 1970s including The Taking of Pelham One Two Three, The Hot Rock, and The Anderson Tapes, turning down the opportunity to direct other films such as Horrible Bosses, which he instead produced. Ratner also wanted to work with Murphy, whom Ratner partially credited as inspiring his Rush Hour films. As the script began to be finalized, Murphy was drawn back into the much changed project after being informed of Ben Stiller's participation, with Murphy being offered the role of Slide. Murphy rejoined as both a cast member and producer, alongside Grazer and Kim Roth. In late October 2010, the film was finally scheduled for release, being given a November 4, 2011, release date.

=== Writing ===
Feeling the original concept was too close to Ocean's Eleven, Ratner attempted to recruit Rush Hour screenwriter Nathanson to perform additional work on the Tower Heist script, but at that time Nathanson was unavailable. Ratner instead hired Griffin, a writer on the Ocean's Eleven remake. Griffin "brought the real motivation and the heart to the concept", moving away from the premise of performing an ensemble heist on a rich Donald Trump type, and focusing instead on a group of blue-collar employees who take on a corrupt, thieving Bernard Madoff like businessman who has embezzled their pensions. Ratner enjoyed the pitch and brought it to Grazer who gave his approval. After taking the script to Stiller and bringing him into the project, Ratner had Noah Baumbach perform specific rewrites for Stiller's character. Nathanson then came aboard the project and performed the final rewrites to Griffin's screenplay in October 2010, adding "the obstacles, complexities and specificities of the characters".

To help develop the script, the filmmakers and writers spoke with the resident managers of several high-profile New York hotels to learn of their experiences interacting with their clientele. This research gave Griffin the idea for Shaw's possessing a vehicle in his apartment, which Grazer and Ratner eventually decided would be a rare 1963 Ferrari 250 GT Lusso which once belonged to Steve McQueen. On his research, Nathanson said "It was informative, to say the least, to speak with the people who work in these buildings. I interviewed everyone from doormen to housekeepers to building managers. There's a whole underworld to the New York building scene that exists in the basements that most people are unaware of. They make it all possible, and you just never see it. It's fascinating."

=== Filming ===
Filming recreates the Macy's Thanksgiving Day Parade on location in New York City for the climax of the heist.

Filming began in November 2010, taking place entirely in New York City on a budget of $85 million ($75 million after tax rebates). Production designer Kristi Zea visited several upscale hotels and high-rise residences to research the design elements to incorporate into the opulent surroundings of the tower and Shaw's penthouse. Zea created an amalgamation of the elements she saw during her research to create a sophisticated lobby design for the tower. For Shaw's penthouse, Zea took inspiration from a top-floor apartment in the Trump International Hotel and Tower at Central Park West in Columbus Circle. Zea populated the apartment with an assortment of art pieces to represent Shaw's status, based on specific artists and works that Ratner suggested. Zea decided to use modern-classic reproduction designs by artists such as Pablo Picasso, Francis Bacon, Cy Twombly, and Andy Warhol. Explaining her decision, Zea said "These days, it seems wealthy people want to have wall power. They want to have art on their walls that means something and shows people, just like a car, that, 'I'm rich, I'm smart and I know what I'm doing.'"

Donald Trump allowed the production to use several of his own properties to portray the luxurious locales with the Trump International Hotel and Tower being used for exterior shots of the tower. Sections of the building were recreated on closed green screen sets for some of the film's visual effects. A foot and car chase sequence was filmed on Central Park West and Columbus Avenue. Some vehicle filming occurred on sound stages in Brooklyn. The burglary itself takes place during the Macy's Thanksgiving Day Parade, requiring the crew to film parts of the actual parade itself, and then recreate the event one week later for further filming.

For Shaw's Ferrari, it was decided that purchasing an actual model – of which only 350 exist and would cost at least $1 million – would be too expensive and the vehicle would be unsuitable for filming purposes. Instead, two replicas were commissioned, a process which took three months under the supervision of prop master Peter Gelfman. The replicas then received additional reinforcement for filming purposes from Steve Kirshoff and the special effects crew. After running camera tests on several authentic Ferrari colors, it was decided to paint the replicas bright red in order to create a lasting impression instead of using the actual metallic brown muted-coloring of McQueen's vehicle. Sidibe and Murphy performed the only improvised scene, in which they are cracking a safe together. Test screenings did not result in any scenes being cut from the film, with Ratner claiming that the theatrical version is his "director's cut". He did remove some scenes which he felt "didn't fit", or did not match the PG-13 rating the filmmakers were targeting.

In post-production, Universal decided to film a new scene for the ending that would feature a reunion between Stiller and Murphy's characters. Murphy refused to return unless he was paid a further $500,000 on top of his $7.5 million salary. The studio declined to pay the additional money and the scene was not shot.

== Music ==
The film's soundtrack album and musical score was composed by Christophe Beck and produced by Jake Monaco and was released on November 1, 2011, by Varèse Sarabande, Back Lot Music and Colosseum Records. It consists of 22 tracks with a runtime of 40 minutes.

== Release ==
The world premiere of Tower Heist took place on October 24, 2011, at the Ziegfeld Theatre in New York City. The film was theatrically released on November 4, 2011, in the United States by Universal Pictures and Relativity Media.

=== Video on demand boycott ===
On October 5, 2011, Universal Pictures announced that Tower Heist would be made available for home viewing via parent company Comcast's video on demand system three weeks after its theatrical debut at the rental cost of $59.99. The move was announced as a test case, to be conducted only in Atlanta and Portland. The move met with criticism from cinema chains over concern that the test and any further future implementation would impact ticket sales. The following day, Cinemark Theatres – the third largest cinema chain in the United States – threatened to not show the film at all if Universal proceeded with the test. On October 11, 2011, several independent theater chains, including Galaxy Theatres, Regency Theatres and Emagine Theatres, and small cinema houses representing approximately 50 screens across the country, also threatened not to play Tower Heist. The following day the chains were joined by 950-screen National Amusements theater chain. In response, Universal Pictures released a statement saying that they would no longer pursue the proposed test.

=== Box office ===
Tower Heist earned $78 million in the United States and Canada, and $74.9 million in other territories, for a worldwide gross of $152.9 million. Pre-release audience tracking in the United States indicated that the film had strong awareness among males of all ages, followed by older women. Universal Pictures projected opening takings of $25–30 million during the opening weekend – aiming below expectations due to a slow marketplace – with rival studios claiming that the film would need to make at least $30 million to be a success. In the United States and Canada, Tower Heist opened in 3,367 theaters. The film took $85,000 from midnight screenings and a total of $8.5 million opening Friday, becoming the number one grossing film for the day. Although the film had been expected to be the number one film for the weekend, it took $10.5 million on the opening Saturday, falling behind the animated film Puss in Boots ($15.3 million). Tower Heist became the number two film for the weekend with $24 million, behind Puss in Boots ($34 million), with 70% of the audience being over the age of 25—the largest segment, 27%, being over 50—and 56% male. The opening audience was ethnically diverse consisting of 48% Caucasian, 21% African American, and 21% Hispanic. Tower Heist was released on November 2, 2011, in the United Kingdom and opened in a total of 23 countries, including Germany, Spain, Hong Kong, and India, by November 4, 2011, at a total of 1,948 theaters. The opening weekend saw the film gross $9.5 million – an average of $5,000 per theater – with the largest earnings coming from the United Kingdom ($2.3 million at 416 theaters) where it was the number three film for the weekend, and Spain ($1.6 million at 300 theaters) where it was the number two film.

=== Home media ===
Tower Heist was released on DVD and Blu-ray Disc in the United States on February 21, 2012. The DVD and Blu-ray disc versions contain two alternate endings to the film, deleted and alternate scenes, a gag reel of mistakes made during filming, commentary on the film by Ratner, Griffin, Nathanson, and editor Mark Helfrich, and a behind the scenes film that details the development process of the film. The Blu-ray edition additionally contains film storyboards, three videos about the filmmaking process led by Ratner, and musical tracks from the film.

== Reception ==
=== Critical response ===
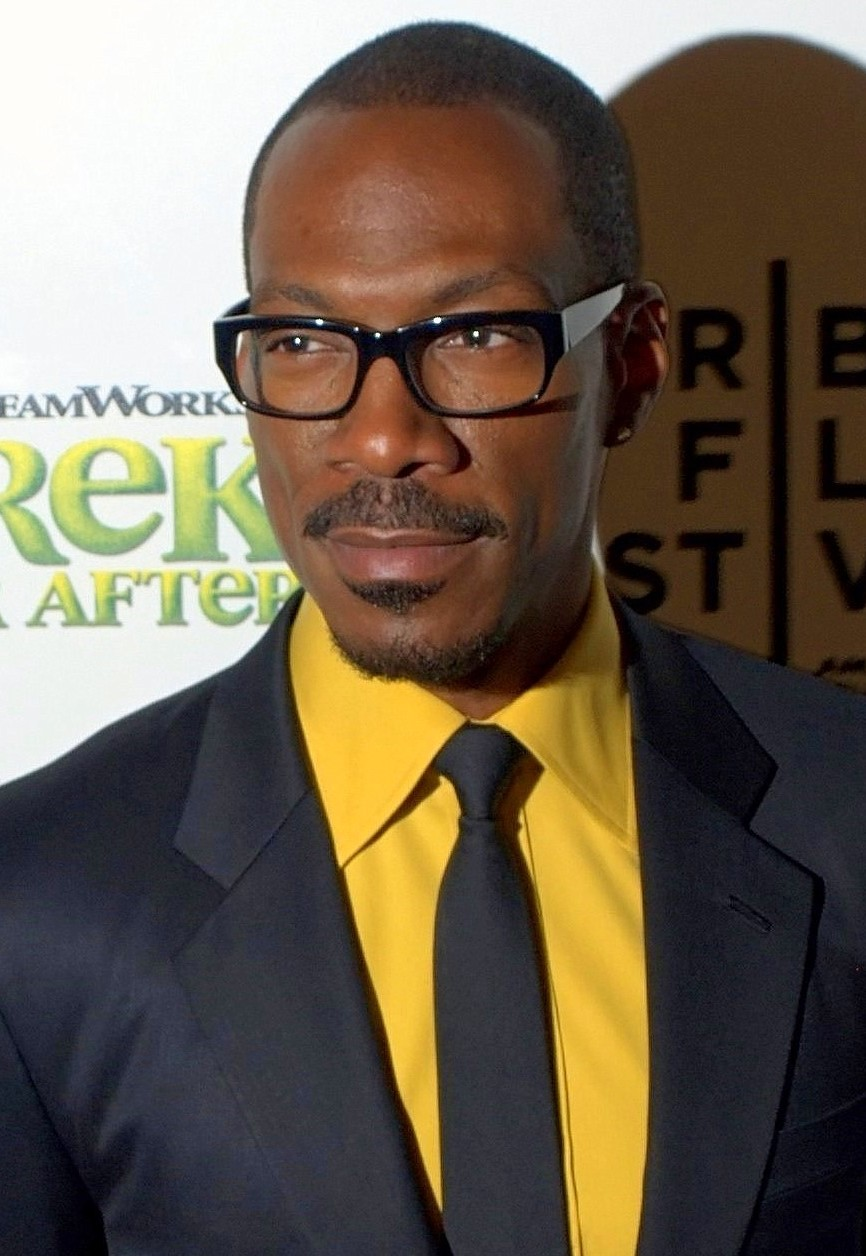
Eddie Murphy received praise from several critics who felt his performance was a return to his popular style of the 1980s, following a string of critical and commercial failures.

On Rotten Tomatoes, the film has an approval rating of 67% based on reviews from 198 critics, with an average rating of 6.20/10. The site's critics consensus reads: "Tower Heist is a true Brett Ratner joint: little brains to this caper, but it's fun fluff, exciting to watch, and showcases a welcome return to form for Eddie Murphy." Metacritic gave the film a weighted average score of 59 out of 100, based on reviews from 39 critics, indicating "mixed or average reviews". Audiences polled by CinemaScore gave the film an average grade of "B" on an A+ to F scale.

Tim Robey of The Daily Telegraph called the film "a tolerably enjoyable Brett Ratner movie", labeling it "brash, forgettable fun". He criticized Ratner for having the mostly white characters require the aid of a black character for the heist, saying "it's a little embarrassing that they can't conceive of doing this without bailing a black criminal out of jail but cultural sensitivity has never been Ratner's strong suit." The Hollywood Reporter's Todd McCarthy said that the film is "snappy, well cast and streetwise" but felt that it ignored the "contemporary economic issues at its core". McCarthy said that Murphy's performance was a return to form as "the rude, confrontational, wiseass Murphy audiences have nearly forgotten after all the silly kid comedies and heavy-makeup outings of recent years", and said that with his introduction "the film's energy and amusement level kick up a few notches", but that the enjoyment ebbs during the actual break-in, in which "Murphy becomes neutered ... and the logistics of the heist become too far-fetched and laborious."

New York's David Edelstein called it "a shameless but exuberantly well-done caper comedy", and praised the performances of Stiller, Murphy and Leoni, saying "Ben Stiller ... and Eddie Murphy ... show off two of the best fastballs in comedy, and Téa Leoni's best scene as an FBI agent – drunk, both sloppy and blunt – makes you wish she had more." Emanuel Levy called Tower Heist a "formulaic, haphazardly plotted action comedy ... whose best asset is its strong ensemble." Levy said "What makes the picture ... work is not its plot, which is overly familiar and utterly implausible, but the socio-psychological dynamics that prevail among the [characters]." Levy singled out Stiller as "well cast" and Sidibe as having "some of the picture's best lines", but gave individual praise to Murphy, saying that he "dominates the second half of the picture", rendering "a joyous performance that recalls his witty, charming, streetwise roles of the 1980s".

Empire's Nick de Semlyen awarded the film three out of five stars, calling it "fun if uneven stuff from Ratner", with a "fairly dull" opening act. Semlyen said it was "a welcome return to form for Eddie Murphy", but was critical that he is "sorely underused". Semlyen praised Alda, saying that it is his "smarm offensive that turns out to be the primary pleasure". The Village Voice's Nick Pinkerton said that the film "deserves credit as a clean, well-turned job, fleet and funny and inconsequential", and appreciated the cast, praising Leoni as the "best thing going", and Murphy's "inspired" contributions. Pinkerton was critical of the script, describing it as "amateur as its crooks: the audience isn't even fully aware of who's in on the job when it kicks off, while other threads are left dangling."

Roger Ebert awarded the film 2.5 out of 4, saying "This isn't a great heist movie for a lot of reasons, beginning with the stupidity of its heist plan and the impossibility of these characters ever being successful at anything more complex than standing in line", but appreciated that the comedy did not "go heavy on the excremental, the masturbatory and symphonies of four-letter words", calling it "funny in an innocent screwball kind of way". Lisa Schwarzbaum of Entertainment Weekly called the film "overblinged, eye-catching, and essentially tacky", and praised Murphy, saying "when Murphy is on screen, his comedic vigor ... gooses the movie's energy level ... but whenever Murphy wanders off, the movie's pulse rate drops. Tower Heist is in effect two movies: One belongs to Murphy, the other to the rest of the cast." Time Out London's Trevor Johnston said that "though it's hard to get excited by this amiable potboiler, Tower Heist is so at home with its limitations it's equally hard to dislike", but criticized the finale "which might have been a bit more tense had we been able to take it remotely seriously". Time Out New York's David Fear gave it 2 out of 5 stars, saying "one nail-biting moment and some much-missed Murphy mouthiness won't keep you from feeling like you're the one being ripped off."

The New Yorker's Anthony Lane criticized the plot, saying "toss everything you can find, starting with roughly diced plots, into the blender: such appears to be the method behind Tower Heist." Lane called the characters "unlikable people" but offered praise to Broderick, saying he "underplays [the character] so well". Lane lamented that "the notion of a theft from the thieves – from those who are lapped in lofty, screw you wealth – is a tempting one right now, but Tower Heist passes the buck." Variety's Peter Debruge was also critical, saying the film "goes wonky on the way to the bank, due to its lackluster pacing and shortage of the qualities that typically earn stars Ben Stiller and Eddie Murphy their paychecks – namely, laughs." Debruge felt that the opening 40 minutes were "a dull blue-collar drama populated entirely by stereotypes", and while the film "picks up some much-needed momentum" with the actual heist, the "resolution feels rushed". Debruge echoed praise for Murphy, calling his performance "a welcome return to the comic's irreverent, '80s-era persona", and lamenting his limited screen-time.

=== Accolades ===
Tower Heist received two NAACP Image Award nominations, for Outstanding Motion Picture and Outstanding Actor in a Motion Picture for Eddie Murphy.

Year	Award	Category	Recipients	Result
2012	Movies for Grownups Award	Best Comedy	Tower Heist	Nominated
2012	NAACP Image Award	Outstanding Motion Picture	Tower Heist	Nominated
2012	NAACP Image Award	Outstanding Actor in a Motion Picture	Eddie Murphy	Nominated
