= The Tale of Four =

2017 American short film

- Directed by: Gabourey Sidibe
- Written by: Ayanna McMichael; Kia Perry
- Based on: "Four Women" by Nina Simone
- Produced by: Lisa Cortes; Shannon Gibson
- Starring: Ledisi; Meagan Kimberly Smith; Dana Gourrier; Aisha Hinds
- Cinematography: Daniel Patterson
- Edited by: Dean Gonzalez
- Music by: Mark Batson
- Release date: September 2016 (USA)
- Running time: 23 minutes
- Country: USA
- Language: English

The Tale of Four is a 2016 United States short film directed by Gabourey Sidibe as her directorial debut and co-produced by Kia Perry, Lisa Cortes and Shannon Gibson. The shot revolves among four different women with four different paths where ironically all their lives interconnected. It is based on the song "Four Women" by singer and political activist Nina Simone.

The film stars Ledisi, Meagan Kimberly Smith, Dana Gourrier and Aisha Hinds in lead roles. The film received positive reviews and won several awards at international film festivals. The film had its premier in September 2016 in New York City, New York and then screened on 25 June 2017 at Nantucket Film Festival. It won the award for the Best Short at the 2017 Urbanworld Film Festival.

== Cast ==
- Ledisi as Aunt Sara
- Meagan Kimberly Smith as Saffronia
- Dana Gourrier as Sweet Thing
- Aisha Hinds as Peaches
- Brett Gray as Greg
- Jacob Berger as Officer Shields
- Daniel G. Cunningham as Jason
- Ta'Rhonda Jones as Sister
- Okema Moore as Jesse
- Jussie Smollett
- Phyllis Yvonne Stickney as Saffronia's mother
- Victoria Wallace as Quincy
