= Voza Rivers =

American producer of theater, film, music, and live events

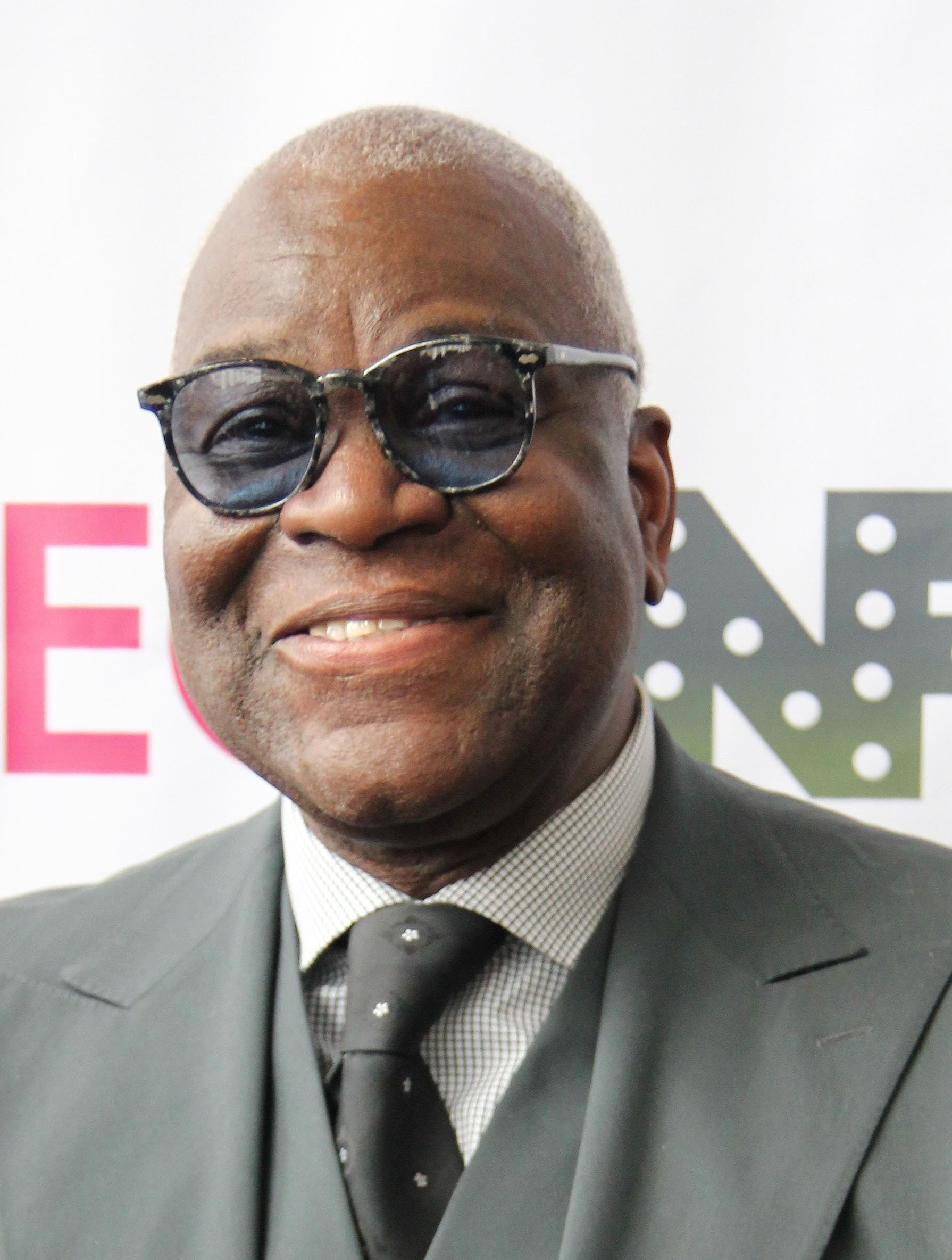
- Voza Rivers
- Born: December 27, 1942 (age 82); Harlem, New York, U.S.
- Occupation: Producer
- Years active: 1964–present
- Known for: Co-founder of the Harlem Arts Alliance

Voza Rivers is an American producer known for his work in theater, film, music, and live events. He was born in Harlem, New York.

Rivers's productions have been presented in various countries, including the United States, Japan, South Africa, Togo, Nigeria, Cuba, Canada, and the United Kingdom. He is the co-founder and chairman of the Harlem Arts Alliance, an arts services membership organization established in 2001. Rivers also serves as the executive producer and a founding member of the New Heritage Theatre Group, founded in 1964, and is the executive producer and co-founder of IMPACT Repertory Theatre, the youth and music division of the New Heritage Theatre Group.

In addition to his roles in theater, Rivers holds positions as the first vice president of the Greater Harlem Chamber of Commerce and is a co-founder and executive producer of HARLEM WEEK, an annual celebration of Harlem's economic, political, and cultural history that began in 1974. He is also the former chairman of the board of directors of Community Works, a nonprofit arts and education organization.
