= Esther Armah =

English playwright, radio host, political journalist

- Born: London, England
- Occupations: Playwright; Radio host; Political commentator
- Parents: Kwesi Armah; Esther Yaa Agyemang Armah

Esther Armah is a British-born playwright, radio host and political commentator living in Brooklyn, New York. She currently hosts The Spin, a talk show, for the African-American Public Radio Consortium.

== Biography ==
Armah was born in London, England, to Kwesi Armah, a Ghanaian politician and ambassador to the United Kingdom, and his wife, Esther Yaa Agyemang Armah. She was raised in both England and her homeland. She was in Ghana during the 1966 Ghana military coup while her father was on a diplomatic mission to Vietnam. She and the rest of her family were attacked by soldiers soon after the coup began, and her mother was nearly murdered. They spent two years under house arrest before being allowed to return to England.

In London, Armah hosted the current affairs radio program Talking Africa before becoming a researcher and reporter for BBC Radio and BBC World Service. She was a contributor to Crossing Continents and Law in Action. She was also a presenter for the BBC television series Black Britain and Panorama. At Panorama, she produced a program investigating the death of Damilola Taylor.

In New York City, she hosted WBAI's morning drive time program, Wakeup Call Mondays through Thursdays until August 2013. Previously she hosted that station's program Connections. She is also an occasional guest on the MSNBC weekend shows Up with Chris Hayes and Melissa Harris-Perry.

Armah has written an autobiography, Can I Be Me? (2006), as well as three plays: Forgive Me?, Entitled! and Saviour?. She has also written pieces for The Guardian and for Essence magazine. Armah's works and radio programs explore issues of social justice, race and gender, especially regarding the African diaspora in England and the United States.
