= Rick DellaRatta =

Rick Della Ratta
- Born: October 23, 1961 (age 64); Schenectady, New York, U.S.
- Genres: Jazz
- Occupation: Musician
- Instrument: Piano
- Years active: 1980s–present
- Labels: Stella, Origin
- Website: rickdellaratta.com

Rick DellaRatta is an American jazz singer, pianist. and composer.

== Career ==
The oldest of five children, DellaRatta studied at the New England Conservatory, earning a bachelor's degree in Piano Performance and a master's degree in Jazz Composition. He studied jazz piano with Jackie Byard, Kenny Werner, Charlie Banacos, and Richie Bierach and classical piano with Thomas Stumpf.

In 1997 Rick DellaRatta with Eddie Gomez, Dave Liebman, and Lenny White released the album Thought Provoking. In 2000 he was nominated for a MAC award for Recording of the Year

DellaRatta witnessed the 9/11 attacks from a rooftop in New York City. While watching the unfolding tragedy in front of him, he was inspired to write a poem which later became known as "Jazz for Peace". Rick didn't realise it at the time, but Jazz for Peace would become a worldwide movement promoting peace through jazz.

== Discography ==
- Take It or Leave It (Stella, 1995)
- Thought Provoking (Origin, 1997)
- Live in Brazil and the Blue Note (Origin, 1998)
- Alone Together (Origin, 2000)
- Jazz at Christmas Time (Origin, 2001)
- Jazz for Peace (Stella, 2003) Featuring Eddie Gomez, Lenny White, Paquito D'Rivera and The London Symphony Orchestra
