= Roger Furman =

American actor and playwright

Roger Furman (March 22, 1924 – November 27, 1983) was an African American actor, director, playwright, and producer. He is known for founding the New Heritage Repertory Theater, the oldest active theater company in Harlem, New York City, and taught drama at several universities.

== Early life ==
Roger Furman was born on March 22, 1924. His mother was Mary Furman.

== Career ==
Furman's career began in Harlem in the 1940s, when he worked as an actor with the American Negro Theater. In 1964, Furman founded the New Heritage Repertory Theater with HARYOU-Act.

He was also a founder of the Black Theatre Alliance, which was an organization of theatre groups.

Some of his plays were staged at the Brooklyn Academy of Music.

He worked in various roles on movies, including set designer for The Cool World (1963), actor in Maya Angelou's Georgia, Georgia (1972), casting assistant for Come Back, Charleston Blue (1972), and assistant director (to Ossie Davis) in Cotton Comes to Harlem.

In 1972, Furman directed the WPA Theater Company's production of The Threepenny Opera, starring Geraldine Fitzgerald.

He taught courses of black drama at New York University, Rutgers, and Hartford University.

== Publications ==
Furman co-edited The Black Book, a "self-described “scrapbook” of African American history," first published in 1974 and since published in several further editions, which was nominated for the 1975 National Book Award in the Contemporary Affairs category.

== Death and legacy ==
Furman died on November 27, 1983, at his home in Upper Manhattan, aged 59.

The Roger Furman Theatre (at the Schomburg Center for Research in Black Culture) is named for him.
