= Jamal Joseph =

American film director (born 1953)

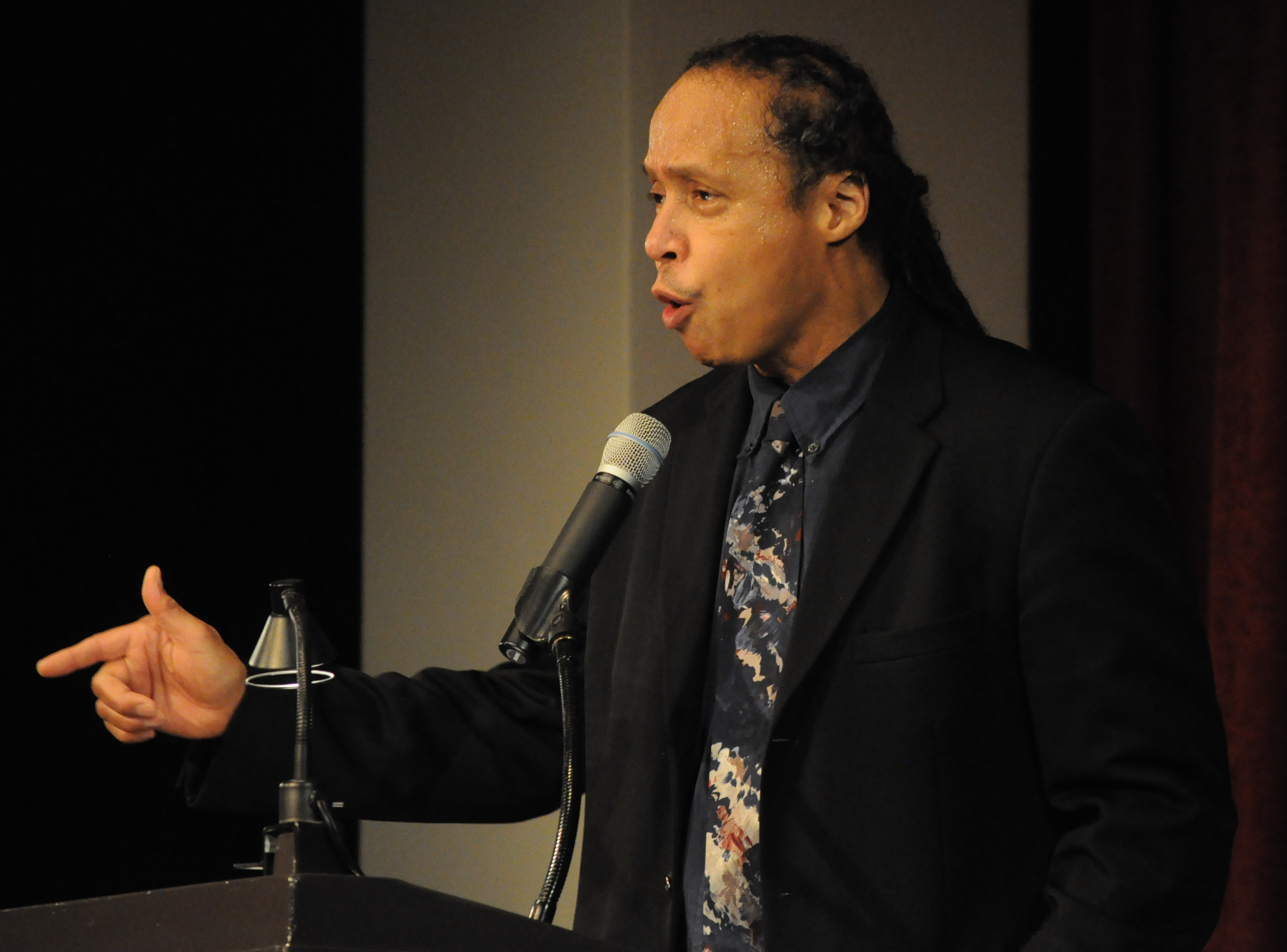
Jamal Joseph, 2012

Jamal Joseph (born 1953) is an American writer, director, producer, poet, activist, and educator. Joseph was a member of the Black Panther Party and the Black Liberation Army. He was prosecuted as one of the Panther 21. He spent six years incarcerated at Leavenworth Penitentiary. In 1997, he became the executive artistic director of the New Heritage Theatre Group in Harlem and co-founded the IMPACT Repertory Theatre.

== Early life and Black Panthers ==
Jamal Joseph was born Edward L. Joseph in New York City. His parents, who never married, were both Afro-Cuban; his father, Alipio Zorilla, was a revolutionary comrade of Fidel Castro, who later served as Cuba's ambassador to Tanzania and Zambia. His mother placed him in foster care when he was 17 days old, and he was raised in Harlem by the housekeeper of his foster family and her husband. He joined the ranks of the Black Panther Party in September 1968 at the age of 15. The assassination of Martin Luther King had occurred that same year, leaving Joseph feeling outraged. He sought out the Panthers believing them to be the most militant Black group around. However, when he asked his local branch to arm him, instead of receiving a gun as he expected, the local chapter gave him a stack of books by African-American authors instead. He was told that was how he would be "armed".

=== Legal experiences ===
In 1969, Joseph was one of the defendants in the Panther 21 trial, which accused the Panthers of planning a series of deadly attacks across New York City. Joseph spent a year in prison pending the verdict before it was deemed he, as well as all other defendants, were ultimately not guilty. During Joseph's time in the Black Panther Party, he befriended Afeni Shakur, who was later one of his fellow defendants in the Panther 21 trial, and would act as Godfather to her son Tupac Shakur.

In 1973, Joseph, loyal to the New York faction led by Eldridge Cleaver, pleaded guilty to attempted manslaughter for his part in the 1971 murder of Samuel Napier, a Black Panther Party member who belonged to the California BPP faction loyal to Huey Newton.

In 1981, he was convicted for harboring a fugitive, Mutulu Shakur (Afeni's husband), who had taken part in the robbery of a Brink's armored car in Rockland County, New York as part of an operation by members of the Black Liberation Army and the Weather Underground. For this, Joseph served five and a half years in Leavenworth State Penitentiary in Kansas, where he earned two college degrees and wrote his first play.

== Career ==
Upon his release from prison, he became a poet, an author, a playwright and director. He earned his BA summa cum laude from the University of Kansas while at Leavenworth. His first position after incarceration was at Touro College, in East Harlem. While there, he was instrumental in arranging historic graduation ceremonies at the Apollo Theatre, with a graduation address by Ossie Davis, preceded by a spectacular Graduation Procession down the middle of 125th Street. He is a full professor and former chair of Columbia University's Graduate Film Division and the artistic director of the New Heritage Theatre Group in Harlem. He has been featured on HBO's Def Poetry Jam, BET's American Gangster and on Tupac Shakur's The Rose That Grew from Concrete Volumes 1 and 2. He is the author of the interactive biography on Tupac Shakur, Tupac Shakur Legacy.

Joseph was nominated for a 2008 Academy Award in the Best Song category for his contributions to the song "Raise It Up", performed by IMPACT Repertory Theatre and Jamia Nash in the 2007 film August Rush.

His memoir Panther Baby was published in February 2012 by Algonquin Books. A television series based on the book is in development at Starz, to be directed by Gina Prince-Bythewood.

Joseph is a co-founder of the Harlem Film Company with producer Cheryl Hill, which released the 2016 feature Chapter & Verse, which Joseph co-wrote and directed. The film was a New York Times Critics’ Pick.

In 2023, Joseph was nominated for a Primetime Emmy Award for Outstanding Documentary or Nonfiction Series for his work as an Executive Producer of the FX television documentary series Dear Mama. In 2024, he won a Film Independent Spirit Award for Best New Non-Scripted or Documentary Series for Dear Mama.

== Publications ==
- Panther Baby: A Life of Rebellion and Reinvention. Algonquin Books of Chapel Hill, 2012. ISBN 978-1-61620-126-5
