= Greater Harlem Chamber of Commerce =

The Greater Harlem Chamber of Commerce, established in 1896 in Harlem as the Harlem Board of Commerce and later the Uptown Chamber of Commerce, is one of the longest operating chambers of commerce in the United States. The Chamber is best known for Harlem Week, an annual celebration of Harlem's culture and diversity, but also under GHCC's umbrella is the Greater Harlem Housing Development Corporation, dedicated to affordable housing and development.
