= Idina Menzel discography =

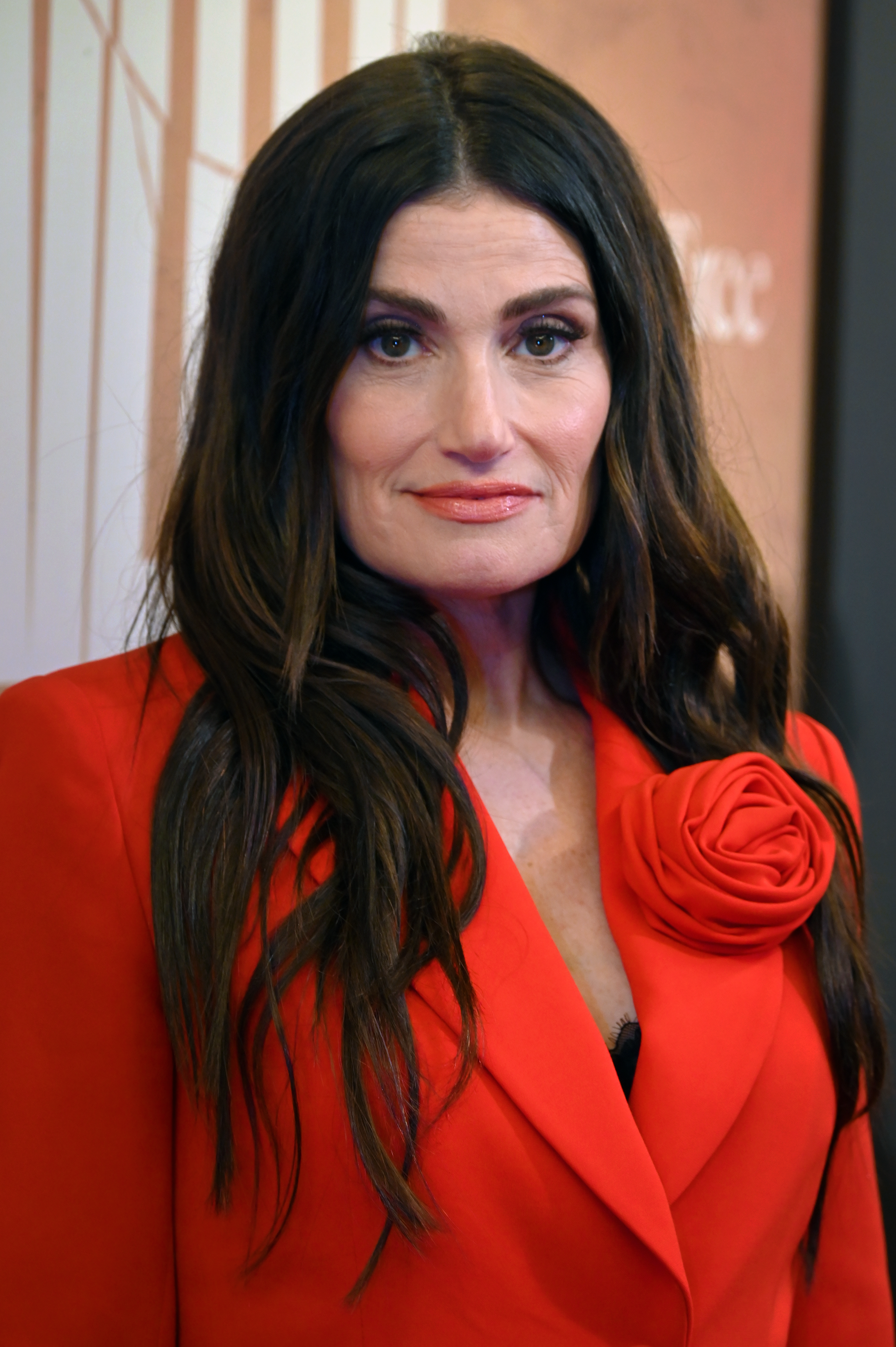
- Studio albums: 7
- Live albums: 2
- Cast recordings: 5
- Soundtracks: 3
- Singles: 16

American actress and singer Idina Menzel has released seven studio albums, fifteen singles and two live albums. She is dubbed as the "Streisand of her generation" by various media outlets. She became the first artist with both a Billboard Top 10 hit and a Tony Award for acting with her global smash hit "Let It Go". Her album "Holiday Wishes" remains her highest-charting album on Billboard 200, peaking at #6 and also debuted at #1 on Billboard's Holiday Albums Chart. Let It Go stormed the charts and became a pop culture phenomenon. It became the fifth biggest-selling song of 2014, selling 10.9 million worldwide via IFPI. Menzel was Billboard's 48th top performing artist of 2014 as well as the 9th top performing Hot 100 artist of the same year. Let It Go is certified 11× Platinum in the US according to the RIAA and has sold a million units in South Korea and United Kingdom.

She produced and released her debut album, Still I Can't Be Still, in 1998. One single from the album "Minuet", made the Radio & Records CHR/Pop Tracks chart at number 48 in October 1998. Her second album, Here, was released independently in 2004. Her third solo album, I Stand, was released on January 29, 2008. The album debuted at number 58 in the Billboard 200, making it the first solo album by Menzel to make the charts. Menzel wrote many of the songs on her album. Menzel voiced the character of Queen Elsa in the Disney-animated film Frozen, which was released in November 2013. Her performance received praise from film critics, much of it focused on her performance of "Let It Go". Her fourth studio album, Holiday Wishes, was released in October 2014. Her latest album, Idina, was released in September 2016.

== Albums ==
=== Studio albums ===
Title	Details	Peak chart positions			Sales	Certifications
Title	Details	US	AUS	UK	Sales	Certifications
Still I Can't Be Still	Release date: September 15, 1998; Label: Hollywood; Formats: CD, cassette	—	—	—	US: 18,000	
Here	Release date: February 23, 2004; Label: Zel; Formats: CD	—	—	—	US: 2,000	
I Stand	Release date: January 29, 2008; Label: Warner Bros.; Formats: CD, digital download	58	—	54	US: 80,000	
Holiday Wishes	Release date: October 14, 2014; Label: Warner Bros.; Formats: CD, digital download	6	55	42	US: 370,000	RIAA: Gold
Idina	Release date: September 23, 2016; Label: Warner Bros.; Formats: CD, digital download	29	—	86	US: 20,000	
Christmas: A Season of Love	Release date: October 18, 2019; Label: School Boy, Decca; Formats: CD, digital download, streaming	123	—	—	US: 34,900	
Drama Queen	Release date: August 18, 2023; Label: Walkman, BMG; Formats: CD, digital download, streaming	—	—	—		

=== Live albums ===
Title	Details	Peak chart positions
Title	Details	US
Live: Barefoot at the Symphony	Release date: March 6, 2012; Label: Concord; Formats: CD, DVD, digital download	53
Idina: Live	Release date: October 5, 2018; Label: Walkman, Arts Music; Formats: CD, digital download	—

=== Cast recordings ===
Title	Details	Peak chart positions	Certifications
Title	Details	US	Certifications
Rent	Release date: 1996; Label: DreamWorks	19	
The Wild Party (Lippa)	Release date: 2000; Label: RCA	—	
Wicked	Release date: 2003; Label: Decca	66	RIAA: 4× Platinum; BPI: Platinum
See What I Wanna See	Release date: 2006; Label: Sh-K-Boom	—	
Chess in Concert	Release date: 2009; Label: Reprise	—	
If/Then	Release date: 2014; Label: Masterworks Broadway	19	
"—" denotes an album that did not chart or was not released.

=== Soundtracks ===
Title	Album details	Peak chart positions				Certifications	Sales
Title	Album details	US	AUS	CAN	NZ	Certifications	Sales
Rent	Release date: September 23, 2005; Label: Warner Bros.	—	—	—	—		
Frozen	Release date: November 25, 2013; Label: Walt Disney	1	1	1	1	RIAA: Diamond; ARIA: 4× Platinum; MC: 7× Platinum; RMNZ: 3× Platinum; BPI: 4× Platinum	US: 3,500,000; CAN: 202,000
Frozen II	Release date: November 15, 2019; Label: Walt Disney	1	2	4	8	RIAA: 2× Platinum; MC: Platinum; BPI: Platinum	
Disenchanted	Release date: November 18, 2022; Label: Walt Disney	—	—	—	—		
"—" denotes an album that did not chart or was not released.

=== EPs ===
- Defying Gravity, May 2007 (remix EP)
- Defying Gravity (DJ version), May 2007 (remix EP)
- Gorgeous, December 2007 (remix EP #1)
- Gorgeous, January 2008 (remix EP #2)
- Acoustic, August 2008 (acoustic version EP)
- Idina Menzel, April 2010
- Beaches (Soundtrack From The Lifetime Original Movie), January 13, 2017

== Singles ==
=== As lead artist ===
Title	Year	Peak chart positions										Certifications	Album
Title	Year	US	US AC	US Dance	AUS	AUT	CAN	IRE	JPN	NZ	UK	Certifications	Album
"Minuet"	1998	—	—	—	—	—	—	—	—	—	—		Still I Can't Be Still
"Take Me or Leave Me" (with Tracie Thoms)	2006	— (Note: "Take Me or Leave Me" did not enter the Billboard Hot 100, but peaked at number 25 on the Bubbling Under Hot 100 chart.)	—	32	—	—	—	—	—	—	—		Rent
"Defying Gravity"	2007	—	—	5	—	72	—	—	—	—	60		I Stand
"Brave"	2007	—	19	—	—	—	—	—	—	—	—		I Stand
"Gorgeous"	2007	—	—	3	—	—	—	—	—	—	—		I Stand
"Hope"	2008	—	—	—	—	—	—	—	—	—	—		—N/a
"You Learn to Live Without"	2013	—	—	—	—	—	—	—	—	—	—		If/Then
"Let It Go"	2013	5	9	1	16	74	18	7	4	34	11	RIAA: 11× Platinum; ARIA: 8× Platinum; BPI: 4× Platinum; MC: 8× Platinum; RIAJ: Platinum; RMNZ: 3× Platinum	Frozen
"Baby, It's Cold Outside" (duet with Michael Bublé)	2014	78	1	—	58	—	58	71	—	—	39	BPI: Platinum	Holiday Wishes
"Making Today a Perfect Day" (with Kristen Bell and the cast of Frozen Fever)	2015	—	—	—	80	—	—	—	—	—	94		—N/a
"Queen of Swords"	2016	—	24	—	—	—	—	—	—	—	—		Idina
"Small World"	2017	—	27	—	—	—	—	—	—	—	—		Idina
"Into the Unknown" (with Aurora)	2019	46	—	—	— (Note: "Into the Unknown" did not enter the ARIA Singles Chart, but peaked at number 32 on the ARIA Digital Track Chart.)	—	39	31	—	— (Note: "Into the Unknown" did not enter the NZ Top 40 Singles Chart, but peaked at number four on the NZ Hot Singles Chart.)	19	RIAA: 4× Platinum; BPI: Platinum; MC: 3× Platinum; ARIA: 2× Platinum; RMNZ: Platinum	Frozen II
"The Loud Mouse Song"	2022	—	—	—	—	—	—	—	—	—	—		—N/a
"Love Power"	2022	—	—	—	—	—	—	—	—	—	— (Note: "Love Power" did not enter the UK Singles Chart, but peaked at number 96 on the UK Singles Downloads Chart.)		Disenchanted
"Move"	2023	—	—	—	—	—	—	—	—	—	—		Drama Queen
"Dramatic"	2023	—	—	—	—	—	—	—	—	—	—		Drama Queen
"Beast"	2023	—	—	—	—	—	—	—	—	—	—		Drama Queen
"—" denotes a single that did not chart or was not released.

=== As featured artist ===
Title	Year	Peak chart positions					Album
Title	Year	US	AUS	CAN	IRE	UK	Album
"Funny Girl" (Glee cast featuring Idina Menzel)	2010	— (Note: "Funny Girl" did not enter the Billboard Hot 100, but peaked at number 17 on the Bubbling Under Hot 100 chart.)	—	—	—	—	Glee: The Music, The Complete Season One
"I Dreamed a Dream" (Glee cast featuring Idina Menzel)	2010	31	—	45	36	36	Glee: The Music, Volume 3 Showstoppers
"Poker Face" (Glee cast featuring Idina Menzel)	2010	20	25	26	16	27	Glee: The Music, Volume 3 Showstoppers
"Somewhere" (Glee cast featuring Idina Menzel)	2011	75	—	—	—	110	Glee: The Music, Volume 7
"Yoü and I" / "You and I" (Glee cast featuring Idina Menzel)	2011	69	—	—	—	174	Glee: The Music, The Complete Season Three
"Constant Craving" (Glee cast featuring Idina Menzel)	2011	89	—	—	—	—	Glee: The Music, Volume 7
"Next to Me" (Glee cast featuring Idina Menzel)	2013	—	—	—	—	—	Glee: The Music, The Complete Season Four
"—" denotes a single that did not chart or was not released.

== Other charted songs ==
Title	Year	Peak chart positions								Certifications	Album
Title	Year	US	US AC	AUS	CAN	IRE	JPN	NZ Hot	UK	Certifications	Album
"Defying Gravity" (with Kristin Chenoweth)	2003	—	—	—	—	—	—	—	— (Note: "Defying Gravity" did not enter the UK Singles Chart, but peaked at number 86 on the UK Singles Sales Chart.)	BPI: Platinum	Wicked
"For the First Time in Forever" (with Kristen Bell)	2014	57	—	62	70	54	14	—	38	RIAA: Gold; ARIA: Gold; BPI: 2× Platinum	Frozen
"Some Things Never Change" (with Kristen Bell, Josh Gad, Jonathan Groff and the cast of Frozen II)	2019	— (Note: "Some Things Never Change" did not enter the Billboard Hot 100, but peaked at number 19 on the Bubbling Under Hot 100 chart.)	—	—	—	—	—	—	73	BPI: Gold; RIAA: Platinum	Frozen II
"Show Yourself" (with Evan Rachel Wood)	2019	70	—	—	73	84	—	8	62	BPI: Platinum; ARIA: Platinum; RIAA: 2× Platinum; RMNZ: Platinum; MC: Gold	Frozen II
"Caroling, Caroling"	2019	—	12	—	—	—	—	—	—		Christmas: A Season of Love
"I'll Be Home for Christmas" (featuring Aaron Lohr)	2019	—	24	—	—	—	—	—	—		Christmas: A Season of Love
"One Short Day" (with Cynthia Erivo, Ariana Grande and Kristin Chenoweth featuring Michael McCorry Rose)	2024	— (Note: "One Short Day" did not enter the Billboard Hot 100, but peaked at number 14 on the Bubbling Under Hot 100 chart.)	—	—	—	—	—	—	—		Wicked: The Soundtrack
"For Good" (Live from the Gershwin Theatre) (with Cynthia Erivo, Ariana Grande and Kristin Chenoweth)	2025	—	—	—	—	—	—	37	—		Wicked: One Wonderful Night
"—" denotes releases that did not chart

== Other appearances ==
Title	Other artist(s)	Year	Album
"Follow If You Lead"		1998	The Other Sister
"Silence"	Corey Glover	1998	Hymns
"How Shall I See You Through My Tears"		2003	Camp
"The Want of a Nail"		2003	Camp
"I Saw Three Ships"		2003	Broadway's Greatest Gifts: Carols for a Cure, Vol. 5
"Damsel In Distress"		2005	Music from and Inspired by Desperate Housewives
"I Will Be There"	Ray Charles	2005	Genius & Friends
"A Hero Comes Home"		2007	Beowulf
"What If"	Rhydian Roberts	2008	Rhydian
"Take a Bow"	Elaine Paige	2010	Elaine Paige and Friends
"When I Fall in Love"	George Benson	2013	Inspiration: A Tribute to Nat King Cole
"Little Drummer Boy"	Jennifer Nettles	2016	To Celebrate Christmas
"Wind Beneath My Wings"		2017	Beaches
"Rhythm Nation / You Gotta Be"	Camila Cabello	2021	Cinderella
"Material Girl"		2021	Cinderella
"Am I Wrong"	Camila Cabello and Nicholas Galitzine	2021	Cinderella
"Dream Girl"		2021	Cinderella
"Let's Get Loud"	Camila Cabello and Nicholas Galitzine	2021	Cinderella
