= Idina Menzel on screen and stage =

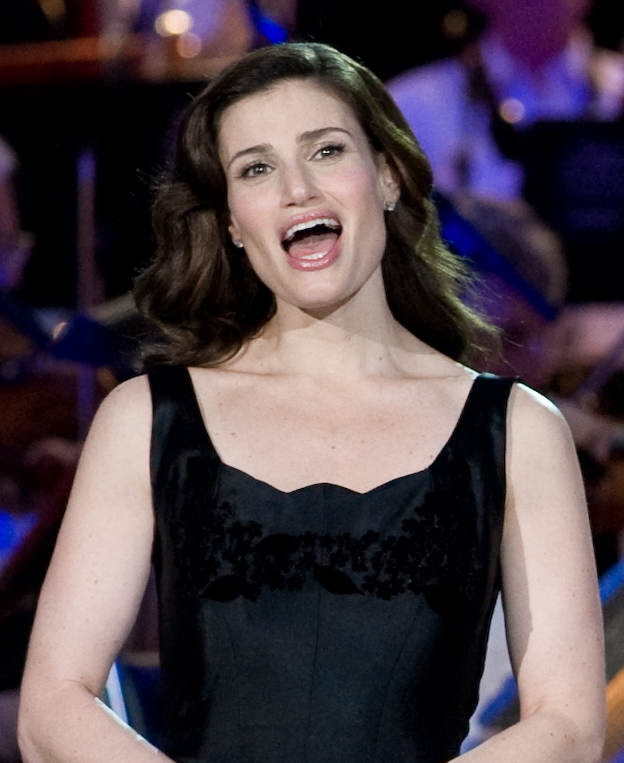
Menzel performing in 2008

American actress Idina Menzel has appeared on stage, as well as in film and television. She rose to prominence as a stage actress by making her Broadway debut as Maureen Johnson in the rock musical Rent. She also originated the role of Elphaba in Wicked on both Broadway and West End, winning Tony Awards for her performances in both musicals. She later had a cameo in the 2024 film adaptation of the latter.

Menzel later starred in motion pictures in the 2000s. She made her film debut with a minor role in Kissing Jessica Stein (2001), before making her breakthrough by reprising her role as Maureen Johnson in the 2005 film adaptation of Rent. She followed this with a supporting role as Nancy Tremaine in the fantasy musical Enchanted (2007). From 2010 to 2013, she played Shelby Corcoran on the Fox musical series Glee.

In 2013, Menzel gained further recognition as the voice of Elsa in the Frozen franchise (2013–present) and in Ralph Breaks the Internet (2018). The following year, she returned to Broadway, playing Elizabeth Vaughan in the musical If/Then. She reprised her role as Nancy Tremaine in Disenchanted (2022), and played supporting roles in Uncut Gems (2019), Cinderella (2021), and You Are So Not Invited to My Bat Mitzvah (2023).

== Film ==
Key
†	Denotes films that have not yet been released

Idina Menzel's film credits
Year	Title	Role	Notes
2001	Kissing Jessica Stein	Bridesmaid	
2002	Just a Kiss	Linda	
2004	Water	Jessy Turner	
2004	The Tollbooth	Raquel Cohen-Flaxman	
2005	Rent	Maureen Johnson	
2006	Ask the Dust	Vera Rivkin	
2007	ShowBusiness: The Road to Broadway	Herself	Recorded "Lullaby of Broadway" for the end credits
2007	Enchanted	Nancy Tremaine	Also voice
2007	Beowulf	Herself	Recorded "A Hero Comes Home" for the end credits
2013	Frozen	Elsa (voice)	
2015	Frozen Fever	Elsa (voice)	Short film
2017	Olaf's Frozen Adventure	Elsa (voice)	Short film
2018	Ralph Breaks the Internet	Elsa (voice)	
2019	Uncut Gems	Dinah Ratner	
2019	Frozen 2	Elsa (voice)	
2021	Cinderella	Vivian	
2022	American Murderer	Melanie	
2022	Disenchanted	Nancy Tremaine	Also voice
2023	You Are So Not Invited to My Bat Mitzvah	Bree Friedman	
2023	Once Upon a Studio	Elsa (voice)	Short film
2024	Wicked	Wiz-O-Mania Super Star	Cameo
2027	Frozen 3 †	Elsa (voice)	In production
TBA	Just Picture It †	TBA	Filming

== Television ==
Idina Menzel's television credits
Year	Title	Role	Notes
1998	Hercules: The Animated Series	Circe (voice)	Episode: "Hercules and the Song of Circe"
2004	Rescue Me	Carol	Episode: "Sanctuary"
2004	Broadway on Broadway	Herself	Television film
2005	Kevin Hill	Francine Prescott	2 episodes
2009	Soundstage	Herself	Season 7, episode 2
2009	Private Practice	Lisa King	2 episodes
2009	Great Performances	Florence Vassy	Episode: "Chess in Concert"
2010–2013	Glee	Shelby Corcoran	12 episodes
2010	A Broadway Celebration: In Performance at the White House	Herself	PBS special
2010	Wonder Pets	The Queen of Hearts (voice)	Episode: "Adventures in Wonderland"
2010	Sesame Street	Herself	Episode: "Snuffy's Allergies"
2011	The Glee Project	Herself	Episode: "Theatricality"
2011	Idina Menzel Live: Barefoot at the Symphony	Herself	PBS special
2013	The Broadway.com Show	Herself	3 episodes
2015	Arthur	Dr. Paula (voice)	Episode: "Shelter from the Storm"
2016	Lego Frozen Northern Lights	Elsa (voice)	4 episodes
2017	Beaches	Cecilia Carol "C. C." Bloom	Television film; Recorded "Wind Beneath My Wings"
2017	Julie's Greenroom	Herself	Episode: "The Show Must Go On"
2017	Ant & Dec's Saturday Night Takeaway	Guest announcer	Series 14, episode 7
2018	A Very Wicked Halloween	Herself / Elphaba	Television special
2018	Celebrity Undercover Boss	Undercover as Helen Gold	Episode: "Idina Menzel"
2018	Mickey's 90th Spectacular	Herself	Television special
2019	Rent: Live	Herself	Television special
2020	The Disney Family Singalong: Volume II	Herself	Television special
2020	Into the Unknown: Making Frozen 2	Herself	Disney+ docuseries
2021	Musicals: The Greatest Show	Herself	Television special
2022	Harmonious Live!	Herself (host)	Disney+ livestream
2022	Idina Menzel: Which Way to the Stage?	Herself	Disney+ documentary
2023	RuPaul's Drag Race All Stars	Herself (guest judge)	Episode: "The Fame Games"

== Stage ==
Idina Menzel's theatre credits
Year	Production	Role	Venue	Dates	Notes
1994	Rent	Maureen Johnson	New York Theatre Workshop	October 27 – November 6, 1994	Workshops and Off-Broadway
1996	Rent	Maureen Johnson	Nederlander Theatre	April 29, 1996 – July 1, 1997	Broadway (Original Cast)
2000	The Wild Party	Kate	Manhattan Theatre Club	February 24 – April 9, 2000	
2000	Summer of '42	Dorothy	Norma Terris Theatre	August 10 – September 3, 2000	
2001	Hair	Sheila	New York City Center	May 3–7, 2001	Off-Broadway
2001	Aida	Amneris	Palace Theatre	September 13, 2001 – January 27, 2002	Broadway
2002	The Vagina Monologues	Performer	Westside Theatre	March 5 – April 14, 2002	Off-Broadway
2002	Funny Girl (concert)	Fanny Brice	New Amsterdam Theatre	September 23, 2002	(Performed "Cornet Man")
2003	Wicked	Elphaba	Curran Theatre	May 28 – June 29, 2003	World Premiere
2003	Wicked	Elphaba	George Gershwin Theatre	October 8, 2003 – January 8, 2005	Broadway (Original Cast)
2005	See What I Wanna See	Kesa / The Wife (Lily) / The Actress (Deanna)	The Public Theater	October 30 – December 4, 2005	
2006	Wicked	Elphaba	Apollo Victoria Theatre	September 7 – December 30, 2006	West End
2008	Chess (concert)	Florence Vassy	Royal Albert Hall	May 12–13, 2008	
2008	Nero	Poppaea Sabina	Powerhouse Theater	July 11–13, 2008	
2014	If/Then	Elizabeth Vaughan	Richard Rodgers Theatre	March 30, 2014 – March 22, 2015	Broadway (Original Cast)
2015	If/Then	Elizabeth Vaughan	—N/a	October 13, 2015 – January 26, 2016	National Tour
2018	Skintight	Jodi Isaac	Laura Pels Theatre	May 31 – August 26, 2018	
2019	Skintight	Jodi Isaac	Geffen Playhouse	September 3 – October 12, 2019	LA Production
2021	Wild: A Musical Becoming	Bea	American Repertory Theater	December 3–16, 2021	World Premiere
2023	Gutenberg! The Musical!	Producer	James Earl Jones Theatre	November 19, 2023	Broadway (Cameo)
2024	Redwood	Jesse	La Jolla Playhouse	February 13 – March 31, 2024	World Premiere
2025	Redwood	Jesse	Nederlander Theatre	January 24, 2025 – May 18, 2025	Broadway (Original Cast)

== Video games ==
Idina Menzel's video game credits
Year	Title	Role	Ref.
2013	Disney Infinity	Elsa (voice)	
2014	Disney Infinity 2.0	Elsa (voice)	
2015	Disney Infinity 3.0	Elsa (voice)	
2019	Kingdom Hearts III	Elsa (voice)	

== See also ==
- Idina Menzel discography
- List of awards and nominations received by Idina Menzel
