= Take Me or Leave Me Tour =

2024 concert tour by Idina Menzel

- Tour by Idina Menzel
- Official promotional poster
- Start date: July 19, 2024
- End date: August 18, 2024
- No. of shows: 21 in North America

The Take Me or Leave Me Tour is a concert tour by actress and singer Idina Menzel. It began in Seattle, Washington, at the Paramount Theatre on July 19, 2024, and concluded on August 18, 2024, at the Steven Tanger Center for Performing Arts in Greensboro, North Carolina.

This tour featured music spanning Menzel's career, including music from her stage roles in Rent, Wicked, and Disney's Frozen.

== Background ==
Ida Menzel announced the Take Me or Leave Me Tour via Instagram in April 2024. The tour title was adapted from the song "Take Me or Leave Me" from the musical Rent, in which Menzel played Maureen Johnson on Broadway.

The tour reflects on Menzel's career. She made her Broadway debut as Maureen Johnson in 1996, and later played Elphaba in Wicked, for which she earned her Tony Award for Best Actress in a Musical. Her stage work also included performances on Broadway, including Aida and If/Then.

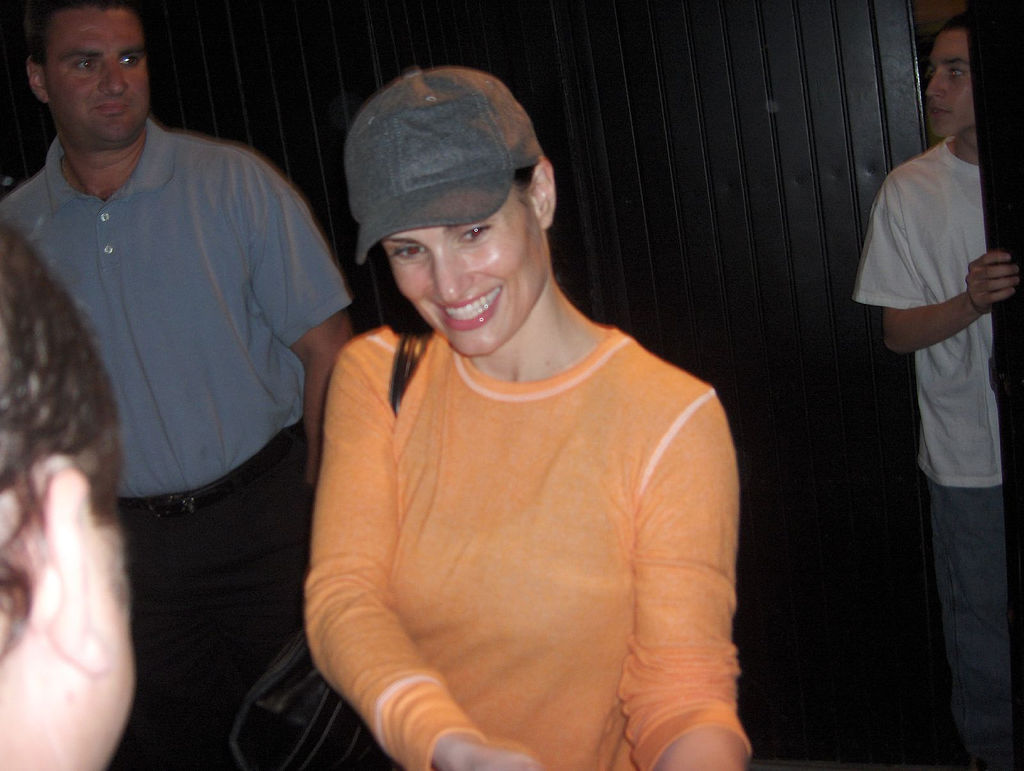
Idina Menzel at the 2006 Tony Awards

Menzel also appeared in film and television, including Disney's Enchanted and the television series Glee. As the voice of Elsa in Disney's Frozen, she recorded "Let It Go" and won the Oscar for Best Original Song.

== Concert synopsis ==
At her performance in Pittsburgh's Benedum Center, the concert began with the song "Dramatic" from Menzel's 2023 album Drama Queen. The production featured theatrical staging, including props such as a couch, dressing table, and clothing rack, as well as multiple costume changes throughout the show.

The set list combines Menzel's Broadway musicals, solo recordings, and cover songs, reflecting her career. These included performances from Rent, Wicked, If/Then, Evita, and Disney's Frozen, together with her solo works and her upcoming Broadway project, Redwood.

Between songs, she also shares reflections on her personal career and experiences. The performance included participation from the audience, as some selected attendees were invited on stage to perform portions of the song "Take Me or Leave Me."

The concert concluded with her Broadway hits, including "No Day But Today" from Rent and "Defying Gravity" from Wicked.

== Critical reception ==
In a San Francisco Chronicle review, critic Lily Janiak highlighted Menzel's vocal performance during her Oakland performance, adding that it was a voice that cleared out all the space between the audience's ears. The review also featured different performances of songs such as "That's All" and "Buenos Aires."

== Ticket sales ==
Artist presale for tour, as well as tickets and VIP packages, began on April 24 at 10 AM (local time). General ticket sales began on April 26 at 10 AM (local time).

== Set list ==
This set list was taken from Menzel's final performance in Greensboro, North Carolina. This does not apply to all dates.

1. Dramatic
2. Everybody Knows
3. Dear Prudence / Do You Want to Build a Snowman?
4. Great Escape (from Redwood)
5. Little Redwood (from Redwood)
6. Buenos Aires (from Evita)
7. Let It Go (from Frozen)
8. That's All
9. Twisted
10. Why
11. Take Me or Leave Me (from Rent)
12. You Learn to Live Without (from If/Then)
13. No One Mourns the Wicked (from Wicked)
14. Heart on My Sleeve / Brave

Encore

1. Finale B (No Day But Today) (from Rent)
2. Defying Gravity (from Wicked)

== Tour dates ==
The list of tour dates was adapted by consequence.net.

Date (2024)	City	Country	Venue	Attendance
July 19	Seattle	United States	Paramount Theatre	TBA
July 21	Oakland	United States	Fox Oakland Theatre	TBA
July 23	Los Angeles	United States	The Wiltern	TBA
July 25	Mesa	United States	Mesa Arts Center	TBA
July 26	Highland	United States	Yaamava Theater	TBA
July 27	Las Vegas	United States	Smith Center for the Performing Arts	TBA
July 30	Austin	United States	Paramount Theatre	TBA
July 31	Dallas	United States	Majestic Theatre	TBA
August 2	Atlanta	United States	Atlanta Symphony Hall	TBA
August 3	Charleston	United States	Gaillard Center	TBA
August 4	Orlando	United States	Dr. Phillips Center for the Performing Arts	TBA
August 6	Auburn	United States	Jay & Susie Gogue Performing Arts Center	TBA
August 7	Greenville	United States	Peace Concert Hall	TBA
August 9	Chicago	United States	The Chicago Theatre	TBA
August 10	Pittsburgh	United States	Benedum Center for Performing Arts	TBA
August 11	Detroit	United States	Masonic Cathedral Theatre	TBA
August 13	Toronto	Canada	Massey Hall	TBA
August 15	New York	United States	Beacon Theatre	TBA
August 16	Hershey	United States	Hershey Theatre	TBA
August 17	Washington	United States	Warner Theatre	TBA
August 18	Greensboro	United States	Steven Tanger Center for Performing Arts	TBA
