= List of awards and nominations received by Idina Menzel =

Idina Menzel awards and nominations
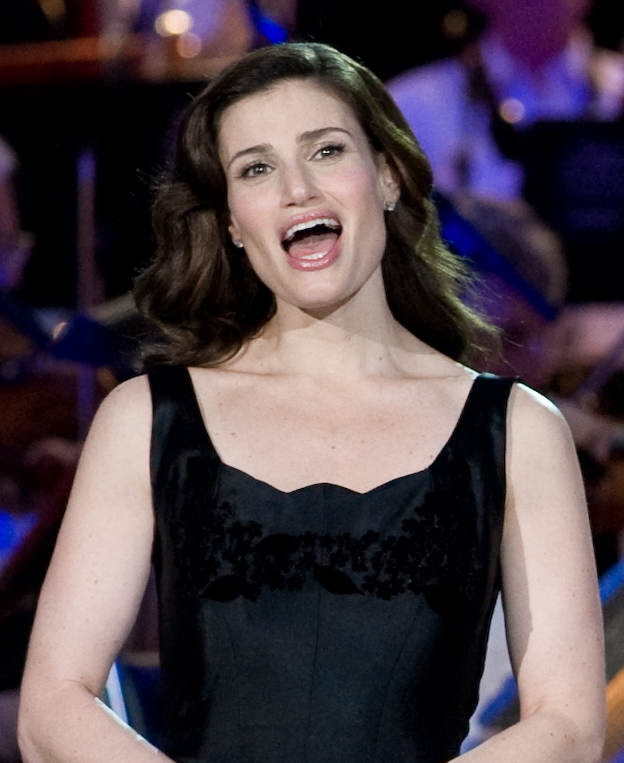
- Menzel in 2008
Awards and nominations
Award	Wins	Nominations
Drama Desk Awards	0	4
Drama League Awards	1	5
Emmy Awards	1	1
Tony Awards	1	3
Obie Awards Awards	1	1

Totals (Note: Certain award groups do not simply award one winner. They acknowledge several different recipients, have runners-up, and have third place. Since this is a specific recognition and is different from losing an award, runner-up mentions are considered wins in this award tally. For simplification and to avoid errors, each award in this list has been presumed to have had a prior nomination.)
- Wins: 4
- Nominations: 13

This article is a list of awards and nominations received by Idina Menzel

Idina Menzel is an American actress and singer. Known for her starring roles on stage and screen, she has received various accolades including a Emmy Award and a Tony Award as well as an American Music Award, a Billboard Music Award, a Drama League Award, a Obie Award, and a Teen Choice Award. She has been nominated for four Drama Desk Awards and a Satellite Award.

Menzel was nominated for the Tony Award for Best Featured Actress in a Musical for playing Maureen Johnson in the Rent (1996). She won the Tony Award for Best Actress in a Musical for playing Elphaba in Wicked (2004). She was nominated again in playing Elizabeth Vaughan in the musical If/Then (2014). Menzel was nominated for the Drama Desk Award for Outstanding Featured Actress in a Musical for her role of Kate in the off-Broadway show The Wild Party (2000). She then was nominated for the Drama Desk Award for Outstanding Actress in a Musical for Wicked (2004), the off-Broadway musical See What I Wanna See (2005), and If/Then (2014). Menzel was first nominated for the Drama League Distinguished Performance Award in 2004 for her role in Wicked. She was nominated again in 2005 for See What I Wanna See, in 2014 for If/Then,and in 2025 for Redwood.Menzel received the 2018 Musical Achievement Award. Menzel won an Obie Award for Special Citations for her part in the 1995 off-Broadway production of Rent. In 2004, Menzel won three Broadway.com Audience Awards for her role in Wicked; one for Favorite Actress in a Musical, one for Favorite Diva Performance, and one for Best Onstage Pair, which she won with co-star Kristin Chenoweth.In 2014, she won two more, for If/Then; Favorite Leading Actress in a Musical, and Favorite Onstage Pair, which she won with James Snyder.

In 2023, she won the Daytime Emmy Award for Outstanding Daytime Special as a host of Recipe for Change: Standing Up to Anti-Semitism. She was nominated in 2010 for Choice Music: Group for Gleeand in 2014 for Choice Music: Single for Let it Go.She also won one for Choice Animated Movie: Voice for Frozen. In 2014, she was nominated for Best Original Song for Let it Go. Menzel won Best Female Vocal Performance in a Lead Role and Breakthrough Voice Actress of the Year for Frozen in 2014. She won the American Music Award for Top Soundtrack for the Frozen soundtrack in 2014. Menzel won the 2014 Billboard Breakthrough Artist Award. She was nominated for a Top Streaming Award in 2015 for Let it Go, and won a Top Soundtrack Award for the soundtrack to Frozen. She won the Whatsonstage.com Award for Best Actress in a Musical in 2006 for Wicked in the West End. In 2010, she won Gay People's Choice Awards for Best Ensemble and Best Music Duo or Group for Glee. She was also nominated for a Lesbian/Bi People's Choice Award for Best Music Duo or Group.

== Major associations ==
=== Emmy Awards ===
Year	Category	Nominated work	Result	Ref.
Daytime Emmy Awards
2023	Outstanding Daytime Special	Recipe for Change: Standing Up to Anti-Semitism	Won	

=== Tony Awards ===
Year	Category	Nominated work	Result	Ref.
1996	Best Featured Actress in a Musical	Rent	Nominated	
2004	Best Actress in a Musical	Wicked	Won	
2014	Best Actress in a Musical	If/Then	Nominated	

== Theatre Awards ==
Organizations	Year	Category	Work	Result	Ref.
Broadway.com Audience Awards	2004	Favorite Actress in a Musical	Wicked	Won	
Broadway.com Audience Awards	2004	Favorite Diva Performance	Wicked	Won	
Broadway.com Audience Awards	2004	Favorite Onstage Pair (w/ Kristin Chenoweth)	Wicked	Won	
Broadway.com Audience Awards	2006	Favorite Diva Performance	See What I Wanna See	Nominated	
Broadway.com Audience Awards	2006	Favorite Ensemble Performance	See What I Wanna See	Nominated	
Broadway.com Audience Awards	2014	Favorite Actress in a Musical	If/Then	Won	
Broadway.com Audience Awards	2014	Favorite Onstage Pair (w/ James Snyder)	If/Then	Won	
Broadway.com Audience Awards	2014	Favorite Diva Performance	If/Then	Nominated	
Drama Desk Awards	2000	Outstanding Featured Actress in a Musical	The Wild Party	Nominated	
Drama Desk Awards	2004	Outstanding Actress in a Musical	Wicked	Nominated	
Drama Desk Awards	2005	Outstanding Actress in a Musical	See What I Wanna See	Nominated	
Drama Desk Awards	2014	Outstanding Actress in a Musical	If/Then	Nominated	
Drama League Awards	2004	Distinguished Performance	Wicked	Nominated	
Drama League Awards	2005	Distinguished Performance	See What I Wanna See	Nominated	
Drama League Awards	2014	Distinguished Performance	If/Then	Nominated	
Drama League Awards	2018	Distinguished Achievement in Musical Theatre		Won	
Drama League Awards	2025	Distinguished Performance	Redwood	Nominated	
Obie Awards	1995	Special Citations	Rent	Won	

== Film and Television Awards ==
Organizations	Year	Category	Work	Result	Ref.
Behind the Voice Actors Awards	2014	Best Female Vocal Performance in a Lead Role	Frozen	Won	
Behind the Voice Actors Awards	2014	Breakthrough Voice Actress of the Year	Frozen	Won	
Teen Choice Awards	2010	Choice Music: Group	Glee	Nominated	
Teen Choice Awards	2014	Choice Music: Single	Frozen	Nominated	
Teen Choice Awards	2014	Choice Animated Movie: Voice	Frozen	Won	
Satellite Award	2014	Best Original Song	Frozen	Nominated	

== Music Awards ==
Organizations	Year	Category	Work	Result	Ref.
American Music Awards	2014	Top Soundtrack	Frozen	Won	
Billboard Music Awards	2015	Top Song	Let It Go	Nominated	
Billboard Music Awards	2015	Top Score in a Movie	Let It Go	Won	

== Critics Awards ==
Menzel was nominated for the Outer Critics Circle Award for Best Actress in a Musical in 2004 for her part in Wicked. She was nominated for a Washington D.C. Film Critics Association Award for Best Ensemble for the film version of Rent in 2005, as well as two Broadcast Film Critics Association Awards for Best Ensemble and Best Song Performance, two Northeastern Critics Award for Best Ensemble and Best Supporting Actress, and an Online Film & Television Association Award for Best Adapted Song. She was nominated for another one for Best Guest Actress in a Comedy Series for her role on Glee in 2010, and for Best Voice Over Performance for Frozen in 2014, for which she won a Best Original Song one for singing Let it Go. For that role, she was also nominated for an Alliance of Women Film Journalists Award for Best Animated Female, a St. Louis Film Critics Association Award for Special Merit, and a world soundtrack award for Best Song Written for Film.

Year	Award	Category	Nominated Work	Result
2004	Outer Critics Circle Award	Outstanding Actress in a Musical	Wicked	Nominated
2005	Washington D.C. Film Critics Association Award	Outstanding Actress in a Musical	Rent	Nominated
