= Live: Barefoot at the Symphony =

Live album by Idina Menzel
- Released: March 6, 2012
- Recorded: Toronto, Ontario, Canada
- Genre: Vocal pop; pop; rock
- Length: 69:00
- Label: Concord

Idina Menzel chronology
I Stand (2008)	Live: Barefoot at the Symphony (2012)	Holiday Wishes (2014)

Singles from Live: Barefoot at the Symphony
- 1. "Poker Face" Released: February 21, 2012; 2. "Defying Gravity" Released: March 2, 2012; 3. "Tomorrow" Released: March 4, 2012

Professional ratings
Review scores
Source	Rating
AllMusic	3/5 stars

Live: Barefoot at the Symphony is the fourth album and first live album of actress and singer Idina Menzel. The album was accompanied by a PBS special and later DVD. The album was recorded in Toronto, Ontario, Canada with the Kitchener-Waterloo Symphony during Menzel's Barefoot at the Symphony Tour.

== Track listing ==
1. Life of the Party from The Wild Party
2. The Professor
3. Love for Sale from The New Yorkers/Roxanne by The Police
4. "You Were Good"
5. Funny Girl/Don't Rain on My Parade from Funny Girl
6. Asleep on the Wind by Jimmy Webb
7. Jonathan
8. No Day But Today from Rent
9. Poker Face by Lady Gaga
10. Marvin's Long Lost Brother (track by Marvin Hamlisch)
11. Where or When from Babes in Arms (duet with Taye Diggs)
12. Heaven Help My Heart from Chess
13. Thank You
14. For Good from Wicked (a capella)
15. Defying Gravity from Wicked
16. Tomorrow from Annie

== Charts ==
Chart (2012)	Peak position
US Billboard 200	53
