= Tamika Lawrence =

American singer and actress

- Born: Tamika Sonja Lawrence
- Education: University of Arizona (BFA)
- Occupations: Singer; songwriter; actress
- Website: tamikalawrence.com

Tamika Sonja Lawrence is a two-time Grammy winning American actress, singer, and writer. She is known for her Broadway stage performances in productions like Caroline, or Change and Black No More.

== Early life and education ==
Lawrence received her BFA in musical theatre from the University of Arizona.

== Career ==
Lawrence made her off-Broadway debut in the 2011 revival of Rent as the "Seasons of Love" Soloist. Since then she has appeared in over seven Broadway shows and made several television and film appearances. In 2017 Lawrence and her band, "The Slay", released their album UGLY. Lawrence won a Grammy for the Dear Evan Hansen album in 2018.

During the COVID-19 lockdown beginning in early 2020, Lawrence started an independent streetwear clothing company called Ready Set Wear and donated a portion of the profits to the NAACP and ACLU, with the goal of supporting the Black Lives Matter protest movement and advocating for sustainable fashion. She also began an educational social media series called "It Be Like That" in response to interest in topics of police reform and gun violence in the United States.

Lawrence's debut solo album, Two Faced, was released in October 2020. Her second album, Barely In The Calm House was released March 2026.

For her performance as Buni in the original off-Broadway production of Black No More, Lawrence was nominated for the 2022 Drama Desk Award for Outstanding Featured Actress in a Musical and Lucille Lortel Award for Outstanding Lead Performer in a Musical.

== Acting credits ==
=== Theatre ===
Year	Title	Role	Notes
2011	Rent	Mrs. Jefferson/Ensemble/Joanne (u/s)	Off-Broadway
2012	The Book of Mormon	Mrs. Brown	Broadway
2013	Matilda	Ensemble/Mrs. Wormwood (u/s)/Mrs. Phelps (u/s)	Broadway
2014–2015	If/Then	Elena/Kate (u/s)	Broadway
2015	The Tempest	Ceres	Off-Broadway
2016	Beautiful: The Carole King Musical	Shirelle/Janelle Woods	Broadway
2016–present	Dear Evan Hansen	Virtual Community Voice	Broadway
2017–2022	Come From Away	Standby for Janice, Hannah, Bonnie, Beulah, & Diane	Broadway
2018	Gettin' the Band Back Together	Roxanne Velasco	Broadway
2019	Hercules	Calliope	Off-Broadway
2021	Caroline, or Change	Dotty Moffett	Broadway
2022	Black No More	Buni	Off-Broadway
2024	The Heart of Rock and Roll	Roz	Broadway
2025	Drag: The Musical	Dixie Coxworth	Off-Broadway
2026	Oh Happy Day	Niecy	Off-Broadway

=== Film ===
Year	Title	Role	Notes
2016	White Girl	Female Visitor #1	
2016	Breakable You	Tara	
2019	Rent: Live	RENT Alumni Singer	Uncredited
2022	Better Nate Than Ever	Drugstore employee	
2025	Fucktoys	Dion	

=== Television ===
Year	Title	Role	Notes
2011	Law & Order: Special Victims Unit	Mignon	Episode: "True Believers"
2014	Christmas in Rockefeller Center	Playback singer	TV special
2014	Idina Menzel: Holiday Wishes	Singer	iHeartRadio concert special
2015	Blue Bloods	Nina	Episode: "Home Sweet Home"
2015	Show Me a Hero	Young Mother	2 episodes
2015	The Wiz Live!	Deputy Munchkin	TV special
2016	Vinyl	Starr	Episode: "The Racket"
2018	The Last O.G.	Dawn	Episode: "Tray-ning Day"
2021–2022	That Damn Michael Che	Recurring	
2022	The Marvelous Mrs. Maisel	Shy Baldwin Backup Singer	Episode: "How to Chew Quietly and Influence People"
2024	Sherri	Musical Guest	Season 2, Episode 122: "Huey Lewis/Mally Roncal/Tamika Lawrence"

== Discography ==
Year	Title	Notes
2013	Matilda (Original Broadway Cast Recording)	Background vocals
2014	If/Then (Original Broadway Cast Recording)	
2015	Love the Coopers (Film Soundtrack)	Sings "O Holy Night"
2017	The Greatest Showman (Film Soundtrack)	Ensemble vocalist
2017	UGLY	With Tamika & The Slay
2018	Gettin' the Band Back Together (Original Broadway Cast Recording)	
2020	Two Faced	Solo album
2021	In the Heights (Film Soundtrack)	Vocal ensemble
2021	Needle in a Timestack (Film Soundtrack)	Sings "Won't Be Undone"
2021	Caroline, or Change (New Broadway Cast Recording)	
2025	The Farewell, Vol2	A cinematic concert written and performed by Lawrence
2026	Barely In The Calm House	Solo album
