= Idina Menzel =

American actress and singer (born 1971)

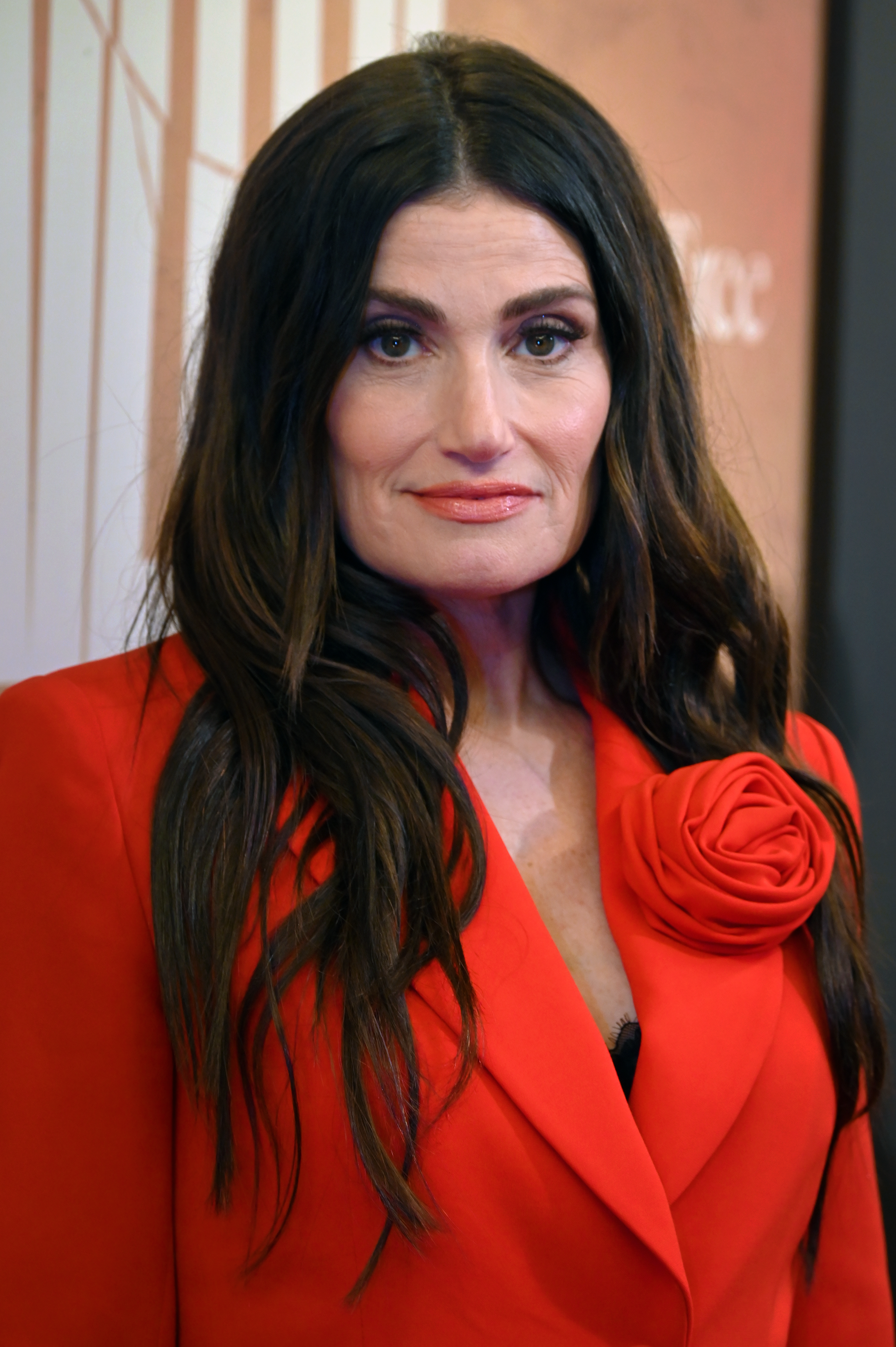
- Menzel in 2025
- Born: Idina Kim Mentzel; May 30, 1971 (age 55); New York City, U.S.
- Education: New York University (BFA)
- Occupations: Actress; singer; songwriter
- Years active: 1996–present
- Works: Performances; discography
- Spouses: Taye Diggs (m. 2003; div. 2014) Aaron Lohr (m. 2017)
- Children: 1
- Awards: Full list
- Musical career
- Genres: Broadway; pop; vocal; rock
- Instruments: Vocals
- Labels: Hollywood; Warner; Verve; Schoolboy; Walkman
- Website: idinamenzel.com

Idina Kim Menzel (/ɪˈdiːnə mɛnˈzɛl/ ih-DEE-nə men-ZEL; née Mentzel; born May 30, 1971) is an American actress, singer and songwriter. Often dubbed as the “Queen of Broadway”, she is known for her work in theater, having starred in Broadway and West End productions, before expanding to film, television, and music.

Menzel rose to prominence as a stage actress in 1996, making her Broadway debut as performance artist Maureen Johnson in the rock musical Rent, which earned her a Tony Award nomination for Best Featured Actress in a Musical. In 2003, she originated the role of Elphaba in the musical Wicked on Broadway, for which she won the Tony Award for Best Actress in a Musical. After leaving the show in 2005, she reprised the role in the musical's original West End production in 2006, becoming the highest-paid actress in West End theatre history. In 2014, Menzel returned to Broadway in the musical If/Then, for which she received a third Tony Award nomination.

Menzel began working in film and television in the early 2000s. After reprising her Rent role in the musical's 2005 film adaptation, she had a supporting role in Disney's musical fantasy film Enchanted (2007). She played the recurring character Shelby Corcoran on the musical television series Glee from 2010 to 2013. Since 2013, Menzel has voiced Elsa in Disney's Frozen franchise; "Let It Go", a song she recorded for the first film, peaked at number five on the Billboard Hot 100 and won the Academy Award for Best Original Song. Menzel has since played supporting roles in the films Uncut Gems (2019), Cinderella (2021), American Murderer (2022), and You Are So Not Invited to My Bat Mitzvah (2023).

As a recording artist and songwriter, Menzel has released seven studio albums, including I Stand (2008) and Holiday Wishes (2014); the latter peaked at number six on the Billboard 200, becoming her highest-charting studio album to date.

== Early life and education ==
Idina Kim Mentzel was born on May 30, 1971, in Manhattan. (Note: While her birthplace has been varyingly reported as either the New York City borough of Queens or the town of Syosset, New York, Menzel clarified in 2019, "[M]y parents lived in Queens and I was born at NYU Hospital in Manhattan.") She grew up in New Jersey until about age three; her family moved to Syosset, New York, on Long Island. Her parents are Stuart Mentzel, a pajama salesman, and Helene Goldberg, a therapist. She has a younger sister named Cara. Menzel is Jewish and her grandparents emigrated from Eastern Europe. She attended J. Irving Baylis Elementary School in Plainview, New York; H. B. Thompson Middle School in Syosset; and Syosset High School.

When Menzel was 15 years old, her parents divorced and she began working as a wedding and bar/bat mitzvah singer, a job that she held while a student at New York University's Tisch School of the Arts; she earned a Bachelor of Fine Arts degree in drama there in 1992. Idina changed the spelling of her surname to "Menzel" to better reflect the pronunciation that the Mentzel family had adopted in the United States. She was friends with actor Adam Pascal before they worked together in Rent.

In 2017, Irish songwriter Jimmy Walsh who was based in New York City said that in 1992, Menzel had recorded a demo for him of the song "In Your Eyes", which went on to win the Eurovision Song Contest 1993 for Irish singer Niamh Kavanagh. Menzel was paid $75 for the recording.

== Career ==
=== Theater career ===
==== Rent to The Wild Party (1996–2000) ====
In 1995, Menzel auditioned for Rent, which became her first professional theatre job and her Broadway debut. Rent opened Off-Broadway at the New York Theatre Workshop on January 26, 1996, but it moved to Broadway's Nederlander Theatre due to its popularity. For her performance as Maureen Johnson in the original cast of the musical, Menzel received a Tony nomination as Best Featured Actress in a Musical, losing to Ann Duquesnay for Bring in 'da Noise, Bring in 'da Funk. Her final performance in the musical was on July 1, 1997. Despite the Tony nod, Menzel said she faded into "obscurity" for eight years.

After the success of Rent, Menzel released her first solo album entitled Still I Can't Be Still on Hollywood Records. Menzel also originated the role of Dorothy in Summer of '42 at Goodspeed Opera House in Connecticut, starred as Sheila in the New York City Center Encores! production of Hair and appeared on Broadway as Amneris in Aida. Menzel earned a Drama Desk Award nomination for her performance as Kate in the Manhattan Theatre Club's 2000 Off-Broadway production of Andrew Lippa's The Wild Party. Her other Off-Broadway credits include the pre-Broadway run of Rent and The Vagina Monologues.

==== Wicked, If/Then, Skintight, to WILD (2003–2021) ====
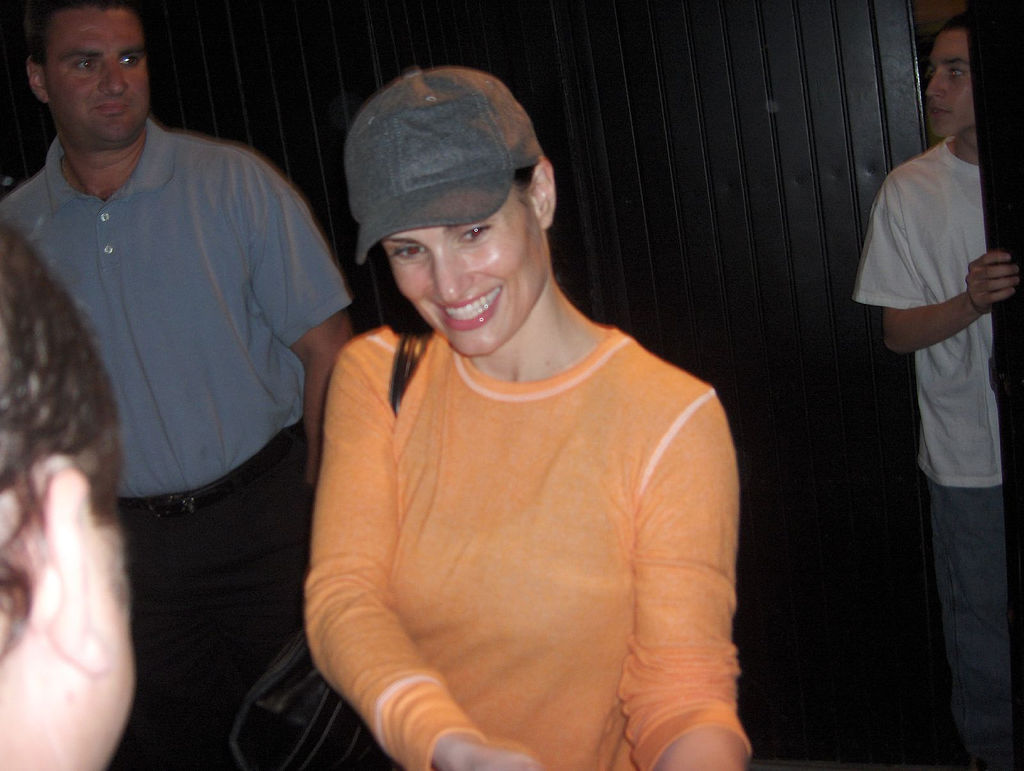
Menzel leaving the theater after a performance of Wicked. She rose to fame during her performance as Elphaba on Broadway from 2003 to 2005.

In 2003, Menzel was cast to star alongside Kristin Chenoweth in Wicked, a musical by Stephen Schwartz and Winnie Holzman based upon Gregory Maguire's 1995 novel Wicked: The Life and Times of the Wicked Witch of the West. Shortly after a San Francisco tryout, Wicked began previews at Broadway's Gershwin Theatre on October 8, 2003, with an official opening night on October 30. Menzel's performance as Elphaba, the misunderstood Wicked Witch of the West, garnered critical acclaim, for which she won the 2004 Tony Award for Best Leading Actress in a Musical. Menzel's character also earned her a devoted fanbase, particularly among young girls who empathized with her misunderstood character, as well as a gay following. She can be heard on the show's Original Broadway Cast (OBC) recording. During her penultimate performance on January 8, 2005, she fell through a trap door during the melting scene and cracked a lower rib. This injury prevented her from performing in her scheduled final show on January 9; her standby, Shoshana Bean, played Elphaba at that performance. Menzel did, however, make a special appearance, in a red tracksuit, at that performance, performed her last song, and received a five-minute standing ovation. Five years later, Broadway.com readers voted Menzel their favorite Elphaba performer out of the eleven actresses who had by then played the character on Broadway.

After Wicked, Menzel appeared Off-Broadway in the Public Theater's production of See What I Wanna See, a Michael John LaChiusa-penned musical whose run ended in December 2005, for which she received Drama Desk Award and Drama League Award nominations. She reprised her Tony Award-winning role as Elphaba in the West End production of Wicked when it opened at London's Apollo Victoria Theatre on September 27, 2006. She starred alongside Helen Dallimore as Glinda and Adam Garcia as Fiyero. During her run, she was the highest-paid female performer in the West End at $30,000 per week. Menzel finished her West End run on December 30, 2006. She was succeeded by Elphaba standby Kerry Ellis.

Menzel played the role of Florence in the 21st-anniversary concert of the musical Chess at London's Royal Albert Hall, from May 12 to 13, 2008, alongside Kerry Ellis, Adam Pascal, and Josh Groban. In 2008, she headlined the Powerhouse Theatre's reading of Steven Sater and Duncan Sheik's musical Nero from July 11 to 13, performing the role of Nero's mistress, Poppea. She was joined by Glee costar Lea Michele as Claudia Octavia, Jeffrey Carleson as Nero, and Michael Arden as Octavia's brother, Brittanicus.

By February 28, 2013, Menzel was cast to star as Elizabeth in the new Tom Kitt and Brian Yorkey Broadway musical If/Then. Directed by Michael Greif (with whom Menzel previously worked on the original production of Rent), it had its world premiere at the National Theatre in Washington, D.C., starting with previews on November 5, 2013, until November 24, 2013. Following the out-of-town tryout, the show moved to the Richard Rodgers Theatre on Broadway and began previews on March 4, 2014. It officially opened on March 30, 2014. For her performance, Menzel received her second Tony Award nomination for Best Leading Actress in a Musical and performed Always Starting Over, but lost to Jessie Mueller for Beautiful: The Carole King Musical. If/Then closed on Broadway on March 22, 2015, after 29 previews and 401 regular performances.

Menzel reprised the role of Elizabeth (along with original Broadway cast members Lachanze, James Snyder, and Anthony Rapp) on the first seven stops of the show's national tour from October 2015 to January 2016. She departed the show (along with LaChanze and Snyder) on the last day of the Costa Mesa, California engagement, on January 24, 2016. Her replacement was Jackie Burns (who previously served as Menzel's standby in the Broadway production) starting January 27, 2016, in Dallas, Texas.

Later, in 2018, Menzel was cast as Jodi in Roundabout Theatre Company's World Premiere production of Joshua Harmon's new play Skintight. The show premiered Off Broadway at the Laura Pels Theatre at the Harold and Miriam Steinberg Center for Theatre. It began previews on May 31, 2018, opened on June 21, 2018, and ran for strictly limited engagement till August 26, 2018. The play earned Menzel rave reviews and marked it her first major New York Theater non-musical role. A year later, she reprised her performance in Skintight marking its debut on the West Coast. The production played the Geffen Playhouse in Los Angeles, California running from September 3 – October 6, 2019.

While appearing in Skintight, Menzel read for the role of Mary Jane in a workshop for the Broadway rock musical Jagged Little Pill.

In late 2019, Menzel revealed on Twitter that she was working on "a mystery project" with Justin Tranter, Caroline Pennell and Eve Ensler (later known as V). In mid-2021, it was announced that this project was Wild: A Musical Becoming, set to perform at American Repertory Theater in Cambridge, MA from December 3, 2021, to January 21, 2022 (she was only scheduled to perform through December 23). It was later announced that she would star as Bea, with contributions to the lyrics. On December 17, due to COVID, it was announced that the show on that day was cancelled; it was later announced that the performance on the following two days and eventually all the following productions were cancelled, making December 16 her last performance.

==== Redwood (2025) ====
Menzel plays the main role of Jesse in Redwood, a musical that premiered at La Jolla Playhouse in San Diego, California on February 25, 2024. The musical opened on Broadway at the Nederlander Theatre, the same theater where Menzel made her Broadway debut in Rent, on February 13, 2025. Menzel and Tina Landau created the musical along with composer/co-lyricist Kate Diaz.

Redwood was met with mixed reviews. Following not receiving any Tony nominations and low ticket sales, it closed on Broadway on May 18, 2025, after 17 previews and 127 regular performances. The show has been nominated for a GLAAD Media Award in the Outstanding Broadway Production category. The ceremony was held on March 5, 2026 in Los Angeles.

=== Music career ===
Menzel initially struggled to cross over into a solo music career beyond stage musicals, claiming the industry did not take her seriously as a pop or rock singer due to her Broadway origins. Menzel performed at the 1998 Lilith Fair summer concert festival and continues to write and perform original music. She has toured extensively and frequently performs in various venues throughout New York City. She produced and released her debut album, Still I Can't Be Still, for Hollywood Records in 1998. One single from the album, "Minuet", made the Radio & Records CHR/Pop Tracks chart at number 48 in October 1998. Following the album release, she embarked on a promotional tour, but after selling fewer than 10,000 copies in the US and missing the Billboard 200, Menzel's label put the album out of print, and she was dropped from the label. However, the album was re-released once she began to rise to greater fame with her Tony-winning performance in Wicked.

Her second album, Here, was released independently by Zel Records in 2004. Menzel contributed to the soundtrack of Desperate Housewives in 2005. She also appears on Ray Charles's album Genius and Friends, which was also released in 2005, on the track "I Will Be There". In 2007, she appeared on the Beowulf soundtrack singing the end credits song, "A Hero Comes Home". Also, in 2007, Menzel's powerful singing voice led her to be asked to accompany the baritone British X Factor runner-up, Rhydian Roberts, on his debut album, duetting on the song "What If".

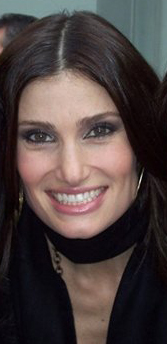
Menzel after appearing on The Today Show in 2008

Her third solo album, I Stand, was released on January 29, 2008. Produced by Menzel's "top choice" collaborator Glen Ballard, the album features soaring pop ballads and includes many new songs, including the lead single, "Brave", the title track "I Stand", and a song released on EP, "Gorgeous". The album debuted at number 58 on the Billboard 200, making it the first solo album by Menzel to make the charts. There are five versions of this album: the original version, the special limited edition, the iTunes version, the Barnes & Noble edition, and the Borders edition. Menzel wrote 9 of the 10 songs on her album, and was the sole writer on the song "Forever."

On April 1, 2008, Menzel kicked off her 2008–2009 I Stand tour in support of her new album performing four sold-out legs. The concert at Rose Hall at Lincoln Center in New York City was filmed for the PBS television series Soundstage. Menzel was joined by special guests, superstar Josh Groban and saxophonist Ravi Coltrane.

On November 11, 2008, Menzel released "Hope," written by Paul Hampton, benefiting Stand Up to Cancer. On November 27, 2008, she performed "I Stand" on the M&M's Chocolate float as part of the Macy's Thanksgiving Day Parade.

On July 19, 2010, Menzel performed "Defying Gravity" and "What I Did For Love" in front of President Barack Obama and First Lady Michelle Obama at A Broadway Celebration: In Performance at the White House. The concert aired on PBS on October 20, 2010.

In April 2010, Menzel returned to the concert stage embarking on her "Barefoot at the Symphony Tour" in which she was accompanied by major symphony orchestras. Her performances included collaborations with the New York Philharmonic, the Boston Pops Orchestra, and the North Carolina Symphony, and featured symphonic arrangements by New York composer and producer Rob Mounsey. In October 2011, Menzel returned to London to perform a one-night-only concert in the United Kingdom at the Royal Albert Hall with the Royal Philharmonic Orchestra with Marvin Hamlisch conducting. Menzel's concert stop in Toronto was filmed at The Royal Conservatory of Music on November 17 and 18, 2011, for her second PBS special. She was accompanied by the Kitchener-Waterloo Symphony with Marvin Hamlisch conducting and special guest Taye Diggs, Menzel's then-husband. Idina Menzel Live: Barefoot at the Symphony was released as a live CD and DVD and aired on PBS in March 2012, with Musical Director Rob Mounsey producing.

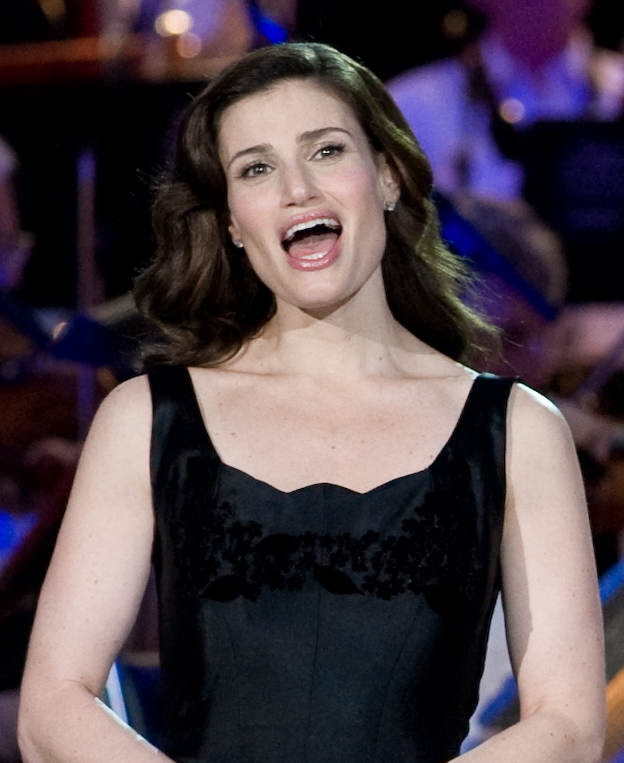
Menzel performing in Washington, D.C., in 2008

Menzel announced she would continue live performances in 2012. The first date she announced was July 8, 2012, at Ravinia Festival near Chicago, Illinois. She made her Carnegie Hall solo debut (originally on October 29, 2012). However, due to Hurricane Sandy's impact on New York City, it was postponed until January 13, 2013.

Menzel toured Australia in June 2013 with shows in South Australia, Melbourne, Brisbane, and two at the Sydney Opera House.

On June 17, 2014, during a concert at New York City's Radio City Music Hall, Menzel confirmed that she was working on a Christmas album that contained original material to be released later that same year. In that concert, she performed one of the original tunes from the album, "December Prayer". The album, Holiday Wishes, was released on October 14, 2014. The album has so far peaked at number 10 on the Billboard 200, becoming her highest-charting album as a solo lead artist. Holiday Wishes also marked the first that a woman had three different albums (along with the cast recording to Frozen and If/Then) peak within the top 20 within ten months of the release date. Holiday Wishes also became the second-ever Christmas album to chart before Halloween during the SoundScan Era after Garth Brooks's 1992 album Beyond the Season. On November 26, 2014, Menzel announced through her Facebook page that she would be touring during the summer of 2015, making it her first global tour and first time playing shows in Europe and Asia.

Menzel was honored with the Breakthrough Artist award at the 2014 Billboard Women in Music awards ceremony.

Menzel sang "The Star-Spangled Banner" a cappella at Super Bowl XLIX on February 1, 2015. Menzel's rendition earned mixed reviews from critics, who praised the quality of her voice but questioned some of her stylistic choices, namely tempo and volume. In a complementary review, Markos Papadatos of The Digital Journal felt Menzel redeemed her reputation as a strong vocalist after pundits had criticized her live performance of "Let It Go" at Dick Clark's New Year's Rockin' Eve the previous year.

On August 5, 2016, Menzel announced she would release her eponymous fifth album, on September 23, 2016. Of the release, Menzel stated: "I poured my heart out and used my music as a place to kind of figure some things out. It's a really personal album." Marking it as her first original Pop studio album in 8 years since I Stand, the album debuted at # 29 on the US Billboard 200. With the success of the album, Menzel embarked on a World Tour in 2017 that traveled to Asia, Europe, and North America. Menzel's concert stop in Las Vegas was recorded for her second live album entitled idina Live and released on October 12, 2018.

On March 12, 2018, it was announced that Menzel would join Josh Groban for his Bridges Tour. For this tour, she served as Groban's opening act before joining him later during his set for two duets of Lullaby and Falling Slowly. Menzel only performed with Groban on the first leg of North America in various cities, including Atlanta, Nashville, Dallas, Phoenix, Chicago, Boston, Pittsburgh, and a sold-out performance at Madison Square Garden in New York City. The New York City show (entitled Bridges Live From Madison Square Garden) was also filmed and released in movie theaters and later on CD and DVD release with an airing on PBS.

On May 11, 2019, it was revealed that she had signed to Scooter Braun and SB Projects for music management. Four years later, on August 22, 2023, The Hollywood Reporter revealed that Menzel was no longer being represented by Braun, having left his management that January.

On October 18, 2019, Menzel released her second holiday album entitled Christmas: A Season of Love from School Boy and Decca Records. It debuted at #2 on Billboard's US Top Holiday Albums. In support of it, Menzel embarked on a three-city concert tour on the east coast including a sold-out return to New York's Carnegie Hall.

On October 11, 2022, Menzel announced on her Instagram page that she would be releasing a concert special on Disney+ on December 9, 2022 titled Idina Menzel: Which Way to the Stage?. The special will consist of concert footage from Madison Square Garden in New York. The title is a nod to Menzel's first line as Maureen in Rent.

On August 18, 2023, Menzel released Drama Queen, a dance-themed pop album, via BMG Showcase. The album was developed during the COVID-19 pandemic. She collaborated with singer-songwriters such as Jake Shears, Nile Rodgers, and more. Singles from the album included, "Move", "Dramatic", and Beast. She intended this album as a love letter to her friends in the LGBTQ+ community and to inspire people to release their inner drama queen. As promotion for the album, Menzel performed a set of concerts with a group of backup dancers at various Pride events across North America and London. In the summer of 2024, she embarked on her 20-city Take Me Or Leave Me Tour across North America. Menzel emphasized to artist and musician Amadour for Los Angeles Magazine, "My job is to be an ally to promote allyship, fight for inclusive representation in the media, and influence policy regarding attacks on the community and the vitriol thrown in our direction. When I say us, I mean my friends and myself."

=== Film and television career ===
==== Early screen appearances (2001–2010) ====
Menzel's feature film debut was the 2001 romantic comedy Kissing Jessica Stein in which she had a minor role as a bridesmaid, followed by an uncredited appearance as Linda in the dark comedy Just a Kiss (2002). While starring in Wicked, she appeared in the coming-of-age dramedy The Tollbooth (2004), playing main character Sarabeth's (Marla Sokoloff) pregnant sister, Raquel Cohen-Flaxman.

Menzel starred in her first major film venture in 2005 when she reprised the role of Maureen Johnson in the film adaptation of Rent, directed by Chris Columbus. Menzel was one of six original Broadway cast members who returned for the film, including then-husband Taye Diggs. Although rumors of a Rent movie had persisted for several years before it was green-lit, Menzel did not consider herself eligible because she assumed A-list Hollywood actors would be preferred if a film version ever materialized, until Columbus approached her directly. However, Menzel was the musical's only main female cast member not replaced by a younger actress, despite all actors being several years older than their characters by the time the film was released. Menzel felt the film's chemistry benefited from retaining most of the show's original cast. Rent was released to mixed reviews and underperformed at the box office, but Menzel's performance was highlighted by reviewers for Entertainment Weekly and IGN. The following year, Menzel and her castmates were nominated for Best Acting Ensemble at the 11th Critics' Choice Awards.

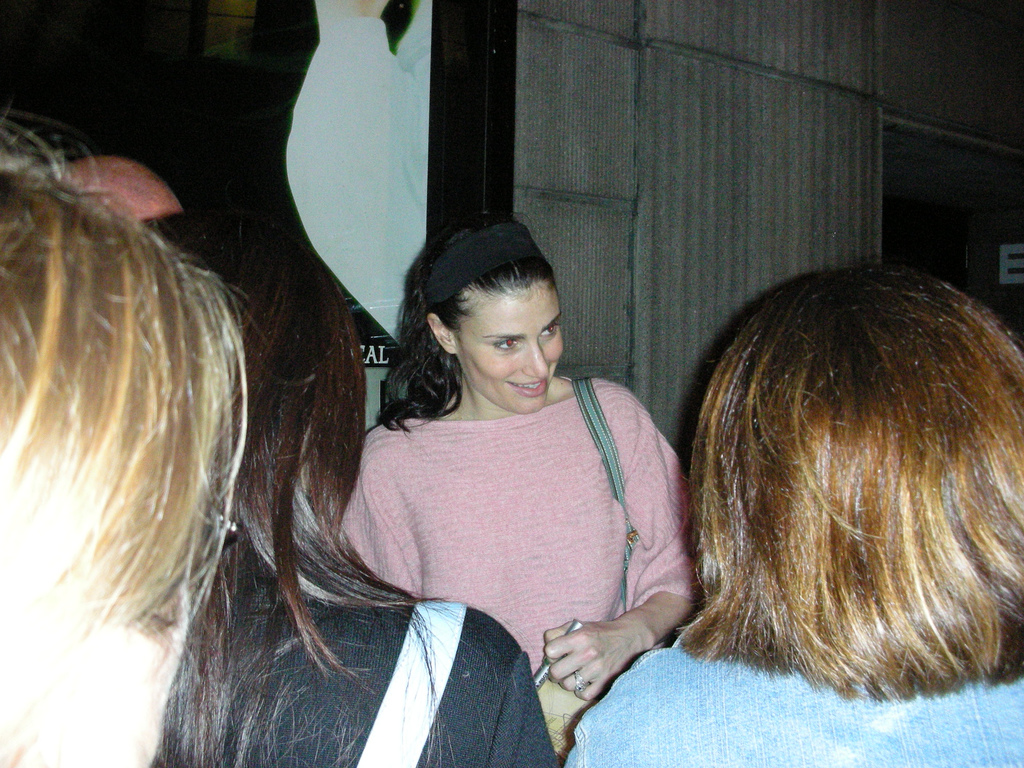
Menzel in London in 2006

In 2006, she played Vera Rivkin in Robert Towne's Ask the Dust, a romantic drama starring Colin Farrell and Salma Hayek. Menzel's character, a mysterious Jewish woman, harbors unrequited feelings for struggling writer Arturo, played by Farrell. Despite her limited screen time, she considers Vera one of her favorite film roles, citing her character's lack of singing and difficulty overcoming difficult situations as essential to demonstrating her versatility. Ask the Dust was poorly received by film critics. However, Kim Newman of Empire cautioned audiences to remember Menzel's name, writing, "the film comes to life when she barges in and finds it hard to keep it together after she's gone". The San Francisco Chronicle's Ruthe Stein said Menzel enlivens the material by sharing more chemistry with Farrell during their brief scenes together than Hayek does throughout the entire film.

In 2007, Menzel appeared in the musical fantasy film Enchanted as Nancy Tremaine, the fiancée of Patrick Dempsey's character, Robert, and Giselle's (Amy Adams) romantic rival. Despite being a musical, Menzel famously does not sing in the film; several songs composer Alan Menken and lyricist Stephen Schwartz had written for her character were ultimately omitted from the final version. Menzel was offered the role without auditioning, and was flattered that Disney would cast her solely based on her acting. Menzel explained that singing would have been out of character for Nancy, who is a New York native unlike the film's more fantastical characters. She opted to portray Nancy with vulnerability as opposed to "a typical mean girlfriend that everyone's going to hate". Enchanted was a critical and commercial success, but The Hollywood Reporter's Kirk Honeycutt and Jim Lane of the Sacramento News & Review felt the film underused Menzel's talents. Some critics and fans also expressed disappointment over Menzel's lack of musical numbers.

From 2010 to 2013, Menzel had a recurring role on the musical comedy television series Glee as Shelby Corcoran: the coach of rival glee club Vocal Adrenaline, and the biological mother of series lead Rachel Berry (Lea Michele). Fans of the show had long observed a strong physical resemblance between Menzel and Michele, and lobbied for the former to be cast as Michele's onscreen mother. Menzel appeared in 12 episodes across the series, and covered songs such as "I Dreamed a Dream" from Les Misérables and "Poker Face" by Lady Gaga.

==== Frozen and worldwide recognition (2013–2016) ====
In 2013, Menzel voiced Elsa – a reclusive young queen struggling with her magical ability to control ice and snow – in Disney's animated film Frozen. After failing to secure the lead role in Disney's animated film Tangled (2010), the studio re-discovered Menzel's audition reel while casting Frozen. Loosely based on the titular villain in Hans Christian Andersen's fairy tale "The Snow Queen", Menzel's character was re-written into a misunderstood anti-heroine for Disney's adaptation, inspired by songwriters Kristen Anderson-Lopez and Robert Lopez's creation of her anthem "Let It Go", which they wrote specifically for Menzel due to its demanding vocal range. Released to critical acclaim, Frozen became the highest-grossing animated film upon release, earning over $1.2 billion worldwide. Meanwhile, "Let It Go" became a global phenomenon, with countless fans and artists releasing their own Internet covers and parodies. A crossover radio hit, the song peaked at number five on the Billboard Hot 100, making Menzel the first Tony Award–winning actor to achieve a top-10 placement on the chart. Despite its non-commercial sound, "Let It Go" ultimately became one of the best-selling singles of 2014, selling over 10.9 million copies. Menzel has since reprised her role as Elsa in most tie-in media, including the Disney Infinity and Kingdom Hearts video games, the short films Frozen Fever (2015) and Olaf's Frozen Adventure (2017), the film Ralph Breaks the Internet (2018), and the sequel Frozen 2 (2019).

Menzel sang "Let it Go" at the 86th Academy Awards in March 2014, where the song eventually won the Academy Award for Best Original Song. While introducing her performance, actor John Travolta mispronounced her name as "Adele Dazeem"; the mispronunciation was widely ridiculed by fans and the media, and subsequently became a viral Internet meme. Although initially thrown off by the incident, Menzel was not upset about the mishap, and credits it with introducing her to a wider audience. To promote her then-current role in Broadway's If/Then, the production printed satirical playbills that credited Menzel as Adele Dazeem, and referenced her previous credits in Nert (Rent), Wicked-ly (Wicked), and Farfignugen (Frozen). Shortly after the ceremony, Travolta publicly apologized to Menzel. At the 87th Academy Awards the following year, Menzel presented Best Original Song with Travolta and jokingly introduced him as "Glom Gazingo", who finally pronounced her name correctly upon joining her on stage.

Although Menzel had already been well known within the Broadway community prior to working with Disney, she was not as recognized outside of her stage credits. The success of Frozen, "Let It Go", and the Oscars incident are credited with establishing Menzel as an international superstar, helping bolster her film and music careers beyond musical theatre. She considers Travolta mispronouncing her name to be "one of the best things that happened for my career".

In 2015, Menzel was slated to star on the Ellen DeGeneres–produced sitcom Happy Time, which would have been her first television role since Glee. However, the project never came to fruition.

==== Film actress (2017–present) ====
Following the success of Frozen, Menzel continued to pursue more prominent roles in film and television projects. She starred as CC Bloom, a role originated by one of her idols Bette Midler, in Lifetime's 2017 remake of the 1988 film Beaches. The melodrama follows the decades-long friendship and rivalry between a brassy singer (Menzel) and a reserved lawyer, played by Nia Long. Due to her typical avoidance of revivals and fondness for the original film, Menzel was initially hesitant to star in the project, but ultimately embraced the remake as an opportunity to introduce a classic story about female friendship to a younger generation. The remake was conceived around Menzel's singing career in a similar manner to how the original incorporated Midler's, whose songs she covered for the film's soundtrack. Premiering to mixed reviews, several critics found the remake inferior to the original, but praised Menzel's musical contributions. CNN's Brian Lowry said "the lure of providing Menzel an opportunity to let loose on these familiar tunes is more than enough to qualify as a win for Lifetime, even if the movie itself ... never achieves liftoff". Katie Rife of The A.V. Club, Linda Holmes of NPR, and MaryAnn Sleasman of TV Guide each found Menzel's acting adequate but lacking the conviction and humor Midler brought to the role, resulting in a less compelling version of the same character.

In 2019, she starred opposite Adam Sandler in the crime thriller Uncut Gems, playing his character's estranged and frustrated wife, Dinah Ratner. The role was considered a stark departure for Menzel, who longed to be involved in a project that differed from the family-friendly material she had become synonymous with. Directors Josh and Benny Safdie cast her based on her performance as a similar character in Skintight, and Menzel drew upon personal experience for the role, having grown up around confident women like Dinah in New York. She described Dinah as "the voice for how the audience feels as they're going through this roller-coaster ride" and avoided devolving her into merely a stereotype. The film and Menzel's performance drew critical acclaim. Writing for The Post and Courier, Jocelyn Noveck found Menzel "compelling in the rare role that doesn't make use of her famous singing voice", while Johnny Oleksinski of the New York Post called her "delightfully abrasive".

In 2021, Menzel co-starred alongside Camila Cabello, Billy Porter, and James Corden in Kay Cannon's jukebox musical adaptation of the Cinderella fairy tale, playing Cinderella's (Cabello) unkind stepmother, Vivian. Despite admiring actresses who had played the villainous role prior, Menzel wanted to eschew "the archetypal kind of idea of the straight-ahead evil nemesis" in order to uncover the trauma behind the character's cruel nature. In addition to performing several covers for the film, Menzel wrote and recorded an original song for her character titled "Dream Girl", which was shortlisted for the Academy Award for Best Original Song. Cinderella received mixed reviews, but Menzel's performance was praised: IndieWire's Kristen Lopez said she played the character "deliciously", while Richard Roeper of the Chicago Sun-Times described Menzel as "her usual spectacular self" and "arguably the most nuanced and empathetic 'evil' stepmother in 'Cinderella' history". Michael Calleri of the Niagara Gazette said Menzel delivers the film's best performance.

In 2022, Menzel reprised her role as Nancy in the Enchanted sequel Disenchanted. Now the Queen of Anadalasia as Edward's (James Marsden) wife, Menzel's character sings for the first time, in addition to serving as the film's "voice of reason". A pop version of Menzel's song, "Love Power", was released as the soundtrack's lead single in November 2022. Disenchanted received mixed reviews; most critics appreciated hearing Menzel sing, while others found her role brief and her song unmemorable. Marya E. Gates of RogerEbert.com called Menzel's performance "one of the few that manages to transcend beyond the subpar trappings of" the film, lamenting that she is "relegated to only a handful of scenes". She also starred in an episode of the HGTV show Celebrity I.O.U. with the Property Brothers Drew and Jonathan Scott. In this episode, she helped the brothers renovate a garage for her friend James.

In 2023, Menzel played Bree Friedman in the coming-of-age comedy You Are So Not Invited to My Bat Mitzvah, reuniting with Sandler. Directed by Sammi Cohen, the film co-stars Menzel and Sandler as Jewish parents raising an adolescent girl as they prepare for her bat mitzvah. Menzel had previously played Sandler's wife in Uncut Gems, while Sandler's real-life wife and children also co-star in You Are So Not Invited to My Bat Mitzvah. Writing for the Los Angeles Times, Gary Goldstein said Menzel fits in well among Sandler's own family, while Matthew Jackson of The A. V. Club said the duo make "a wonderful (and wonderfully grumpy) couple". Abhishek Srivastava of The Times of India said Menzel "comes across as extremely authentic and hits all the right notes".

She also starred in American Murderer directed by Matthew Gentile. During the ongoing time of the COVID-19 pandemic, Menzel created and launched a brand new YouTube web series for children entitled Idina's Treehouse. The series featured Menzel from her treehouse out in her Los Angeles home that originally was built for her son Walker Nathaniel Diggs. It features a full set of songs, stories, and appearances from Menzel's family and friends. In 2024, alongside Chenoweth, Menzel made a cameo appearance during the "One Short Day" sequence in the first of the two-part film adaptation of Wicked.

Menzel is slated to star alongside Millie Bobby Brown, Amrit Kaur, Julian Dennison, Ben Jackson Walker, Brec Bassinger, and Margo Martindale in Netflix's forthcoming romantic comedy, Just Picture It.

== Artistry ==
=== Voice and influences ===
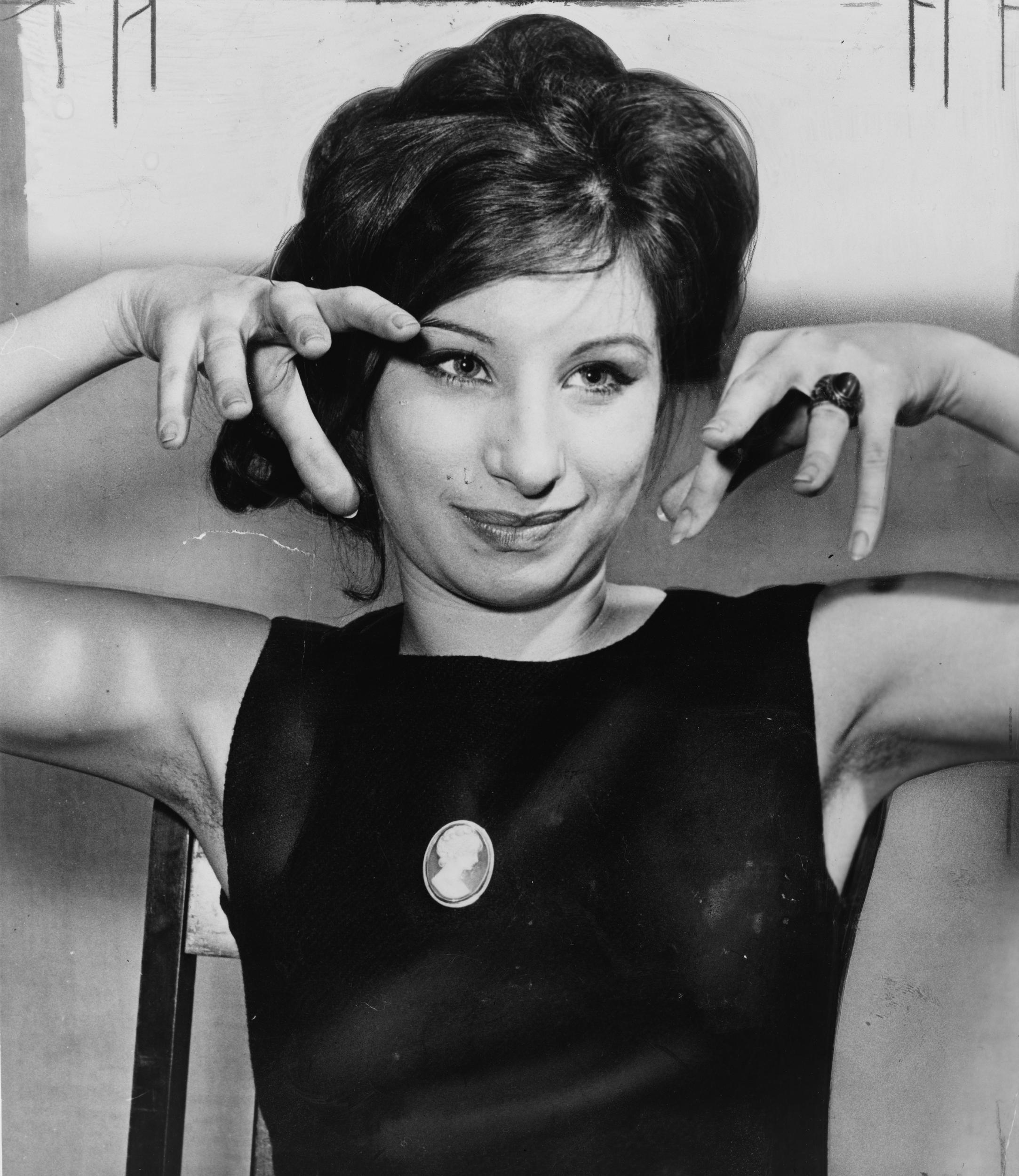
Menzel identifies singer Barbra Streisand (pictured) as one of her main musical influences, to whom she has often been compared vocally.

Menzel possesses a mezzo-soprano vocal range that spans approximately three octaves. For the Pittsburgh Post-Gazette, Sharon Eberson wrote that Menzel's voice "could be categorized as coquettish to flat-out belter and everything in between—and with a stage presence to match—she usually is labeled a mezzo-soprano. But why pigeonhole someone so intriguingly offbeat?" Eberson observed that she "interprets songs as much as an actress as a singer," believing, "therein lies her connection to the music and her fans." Describing Menzel as a loud soprano similar to Broadway actress Ethel Merman, Stephen Holden of The New York Times wrote "The sound she creates when she belts ... is a primal cry embedded in her being that insists that we listen and pay attention." Holden observed that her voice can alternate between "babyish and demanding, or it can sound grand and imperial" depending on the song choice. According to Andrew Gans of Playbill, Menzel has "one of the most unique voices of her generation, a pliable alto that can be sweet and girlish in its middle register and then easily soar to pop-influenced top notes way above high C." Frozen songwriter Kristen Anderson-Lopez described Menzel's voice as "a warm hug" with "this warmth and this vulnerability down low. And then, as you bring her higher and higher, she gets stronger and stronger, and more powerful. She just reaches into your soul when she's singing these big, giant songs."

Menzel is known for her signature high belting style; the Kennedy Center website cites Menzel as a prime example of a "Broadway Belter" who uses the technique to her advantage. Theater critic Charles Isherwood said the singer "has a voice that is very much her own," describing it as "totally distinctive" with "a great belt and a great range." Describing Menzel's voice as "husky ... which sometimes veers toward shrieking until she effortlessly reins herself in or, amazingly, kicks it up another notch," Melissa Ruggieri of The Atlanta Journal-Constitution believes she possesses "a superior instrument" both live and in-studio. Explaining her own technique, Menzel said she avoids moving her shoulders while singing and prefers "to take a smaller breath for a bigger, longer note because there's less air that will come pummeling out." She also maintains her voice by constantly steaming and practicing vocal warm ups, describing her routine as "very ritualistic" and "disciplined". Despite her live vocals earning consistent acclaim, some critics have criticized Menzel's belting for sounding "screechy". Schuyler Velasco of The Christian Science Monitor observed that the singer "made a career out of belting notes that would fry the vocal chords of mere mortals", but felt the emotion of her performances sometimes suffers at the hands of her vocal proficiency. Velasco cited her rendition of "The Star-Spangled Banner" at Super Bowl XLIX as an example of Menzel sacrificing excitement and inspiration for technique, yet delivering an adequate performance nonetheless. Menzel addressed such criticisms during a 2014 concert, explaining that she wishes to sing loud, proud and "from the heart" like her idols Merman and Aretha Franklin. Tim Smith of The Baltimore Sun wrote that Menzel's "high-wattage vocal cords and intense phrasing ... [make] a mark whenever she sings." Menzel admits that she finds some of her most famous songs challenging, namely songs from the Frozen films, which "push her to vocal extremes" and require constant warming up and sometimes lowering the key for live performances. The term "powerhouse" has often been used in the media to describe Menzel's vocal ability.

Menzel's vocal style has drawn comparisons to singer Barbra Streisand, whose song "Don't Rain on My Parade" she often covers, including in tribute to her at the 2008 Kennedy Center Honors. Menzel said she had long aspired to have a career as successful as Streisand to whose Jewish upbringing Menzel has also been compared, with fans deeming her "the next big Jewish icon in music". Menzel was particularly inspired by Streisand's performance in the film A Star is Born (1976), and cites singers Franklin, Billie Holiday, Etta James, Chaka Khan and Sarah Vaughan among her vocal idols. Despite emulating her inspirations, Menzel claims she maintains the importance of "finding [her] own voice." Some critics have dubbed Menzel "the Streisand of her generation". Similar comparisons have been drawn between Menzel and singer Bette Midler.

=== Musical style ===
Professionally trained as a classical singer from age eight, Menzel decided to pursue different genres such as R&B and jazz once she began high school. Upon becoming a wedding singer, Menzel was eventually exposed to a wide variety of musical genres, ranging from jazz to rock and Motown, and often experimented with new arrangements of traditional songs. She credits her wedding singer background with training her to improvise new vocal arrangements, which in turn helps her ad-lib alternative versions of songs when she is feeling unwell or her voice is tired. Her set lists tend to incorporate an eclectic combination of original material and covers of popular pop, rock, musical theatre and film songs, selecting an assortment of songs she expects fans want to hear and feels inspired to attempt new interpretations of. Jay Handelman of the Sarasota Herald-Tribune opined that Menzel's song choices "reinforce her own offbeat personality." According to Menzel, her song selections usually indicate a milestone, choosing to convey a stories and memories about her life using music. Menzel often opts to perform barefoot in concert, which has become a trademark of her live performances. She also enjoys conversing with audience members in-between musical performances. In addition to her vocal prowess, Menzel has been noted for her charming and witty banter; Smith described her as "a pro at delivering stage banter and as quick on the draw with one-liners as seasoned stand-up comedians." On her stage presence, The Denver Post critic Ray Mark Rinaldi wrote that Menzel delivers "the kind of self-assurance that can only come from beating out Kristin Chenoweth for a Tony. She comes out on stage, dressed like she doesn't care, acting a little dizzy, but knowing all along she's gonna hit the right notes."

Menzel has become closely associated with songs about self-empowerment, specifically her Signature Songs "Defying Gravity" and "Let it Go". Discussing Disney author Amy M. Davis believes Menzel's voice "has become associated with rebellion for Broadway fans." However, the artist claims such themes have made her feel fraudulent at times because she herself does not always feel empowered. Subsequently, she began incorporating more emotional material into her sets, such as Radiohead's "Creep". Although Menzel co-writes most of her own material as a singer-songwriter, she considers herself a collaborator rather than a songwriter, explaining that she prefers working with professional songwriters or producers: "They start playing some music, and I like to sing… I can sing melodies, I come up with titles and lyrical ideas, but I'm really not good at making decisions." She has frequently collaborated with songwriter and producer Glen Ballard, and tends to draw upon lyrics from her personal diary and melodies from a tape recorder. Menzel claims she has never completed writing a song entirely on her own, finding the process to be too stressful: "I never had a good song that I wrote, so to ... act like I'm this great songwriter, I would be just a fraud. But, I'm good at bringing myself to it—being a good collaborator in the room." She cites Joni Mitchell and Annie Lennox among her musical influences, describing them as "singer-songwriters who had these amazing voices but also were incredible storytellers and lyricists", while expressing admiration for musicians Bono, Sting and Seal. The Ithacan's Preston Arment observed that "what Menzel may lack in songwriting ability, she makes up for with stunning vocals that remind us why listeners will never stop loving her." AllMusic biographer Marcy Donelson described Menzel's studio albums as a combination of Adult Alternative, vocal, and contemporary pop music. Menzel's fifth studio album, which she considers to be her most personal to date, contains a combination of ballads and upbeat tracks that explore themes about home, personal loss, empowerment, relationships and starting over, much of which was inspired by her divorce from Taye Diggs. Bailey Flynn of The Heights believes the album demonstrates several trademarks for which Menzel has become known: "power ballads that give her huge vocal range and mind-blowing control all the chance they need to show off."

Menzel described performing her own songs live as "scarier" than singing covers or songs from established shows because "You're a little bit more transparent. There's no costume or character I'm hiding behind ... yet sometimes it's more rewarding because of that", describing the feeling of hearing fans sing songs she has written herself as "incredible".

== Legacy and public image ==
Menzel has been called one of Broadway's greatest performers. Tim Beedle of DC.com declared her "arguably the most widely recognized Broadway star in the country". Several media publications have nicknamed her the "Queen of Broadway" due to her success and impact on the genre. Often described as one of the defining singing voices of her generation, Apple Music referred to her as "one of the 21st century's premier vocalists". Jenny Singer of Glamour declared Menzel one of history's greatest musical theatre vocalists, while Valerie Complex of Deadline Hollywood called her an influential performer who has "left an indelible mark on the industry". The Toronto Sun's Jim Slotek dubbed her "this generation's Broadway icon". In a 2020 retrospective, Cleveland.com's Troy L. Smith named Menzel the best vocalist of 2013, claiming the success of that year's "Let It Go" only cemented her legacy as "one of Broadway's greatest stars of all time". The previous year, BroadwayWorld recognized Menzel as one of the decade's 10 most influential Broadway stars. Time Out ranked Menzel the 19th greatest female Broadway actress of all time, observing that she established a "stratospheric reputation" largely based on the popularity of only two roles: Rent and Wicked. Vulture's Jackson McHenry attributed the popularity and endurance of "Defying Gravity" to Menzel, believing few singers can service the song as successfully as she has. In 2018, NPR named "Let it Go" one of the 200 greatest female-performed songs of the 21st century, at number 182.

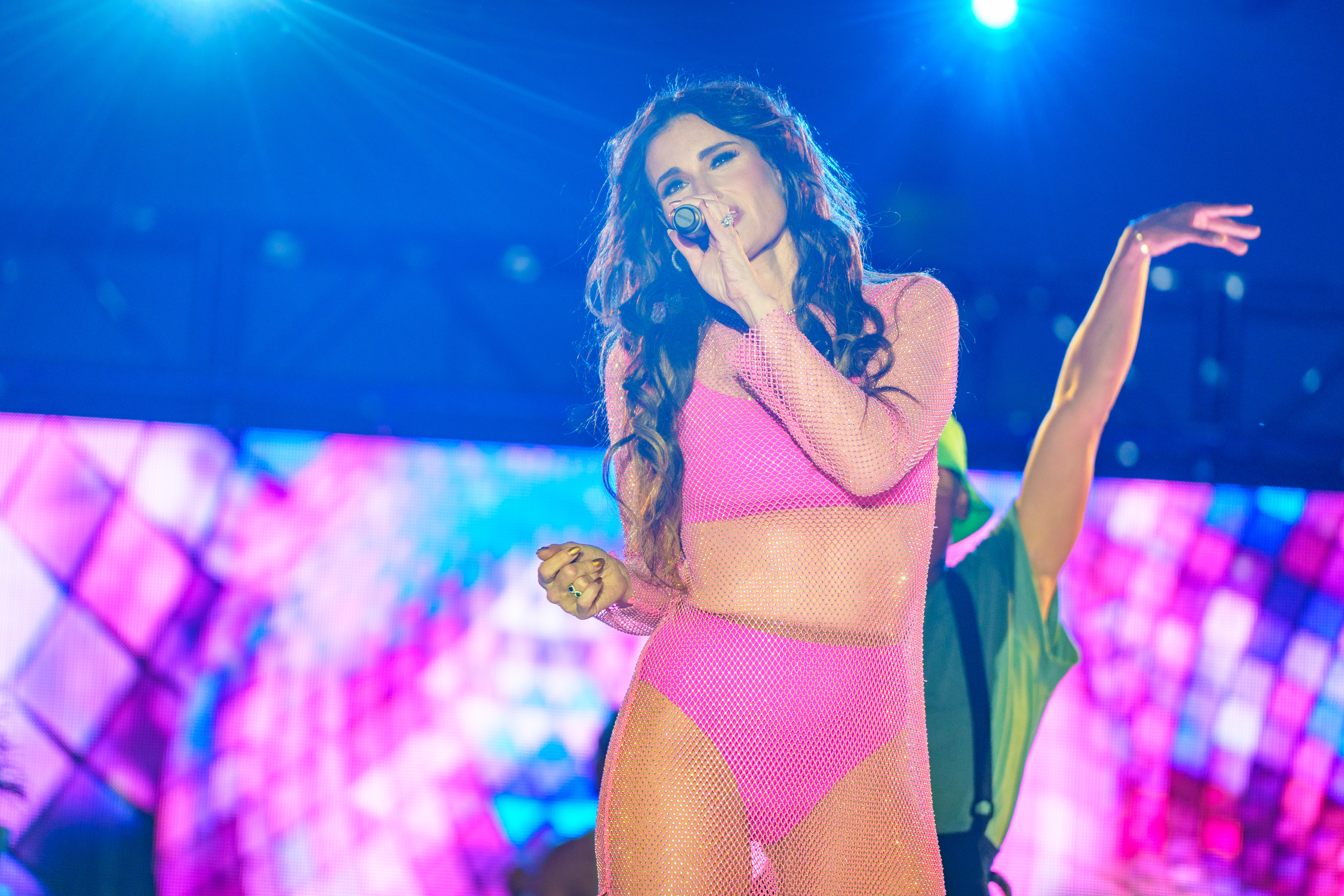
Menzel in 2023

Menzel's successful crossover from stage actor to television, film, and music star has been discussed at length, with Redbook dubbing her "One of [Broadway's] biggest crossover success stories". Menzel's biography on Starz described her as the kind of stage-to-screen star Broadway seldom produces anymore. Marty Hughley of The Oregonian shared a similar sentiment, writing in 2012 that although Broadway does not guarantee global superstardom as often as it used to, Menzel is "a notable exception to the rule of Broadway's declining clout". Original Broadway cast recordings of Rent and If/Then, both albums prominently featuring Menzel as a soloist, debuted within the top-20 of the Billboard 200. In a 2014 article, Billboard theorized that Menzel's crossover success "bodes well for Broadway's would-be stars", believing "Let It Go" "kicked open the door for future composers of stage and screen". When Menzel returned to Broadway in 2014 shortly after the success of Frozen, Suzy Evans of Billboard observed that audience reception was more akin to that of a "rock star" than a musical theatre performer. Menzel's fanbase has nicknamed themselves "Fanzels". In addition to her perceived authenticity, Isherwood attributes the artist's large following to the successes of Rent and Wicked: "two era-defying, hugely successful Broadway musicals". Toronto Star theatre critic Richard Ouzounian credits the same two shows with solidifying her reputation as one of the industry's "most dynamic musical theatre stars". She has been described as "Broadway royalty", due to a combination of her successful stage career and playing royalty in several Disney projects.

According to Akiva Gottlieb of the Los Angeles Times, Menzel's public persona is largely defined by her performances in Frozen and Wicked, and recording Christmas albums. As an actress, Menzel has earned a reputation for playing misunderstood characters both on stage and in film, admitting she gravitates towards complex roles. She cited power and vulnerability as common traits among characters she has played. According to the Irish Independent, Menzel has become "a go-to actress for producers looking for a feisty female lead", while The Globe and Mail's Courtney Shea said she "forged her career playing strong and sensational females". Menzel believes Broadway has always offered compelling roles for women of all ages, whereas she considers Hollywood to be more susceptible to ageism and sexism. Menzel is revered as a role model for young women, particularly due to her role as Elsa which has contributed her a large following among predominantly female Frozen fans. Although she takes her responsibility as a role model seriously, she has stated that she does not always feel like a role model in her personal life and feels uncomfortable bearing the responsibility at times. Menzel has a prominent gay following, dating back to the 1990s when she starred in Rent. Rent was also one of the first Broadway shows to show a lesbian relationship. The performer attributes this to playing several repressed characters who are "hiding something within them that they're afraid to let people see, and then finally they embrace it". Michael Heaton, a critic for The Plain Dealer, noted that some parents have expressed concerns about the "blue humor" Menzel uses in her typical concerts in an attempt to appeal to both her adult gay and young fans.

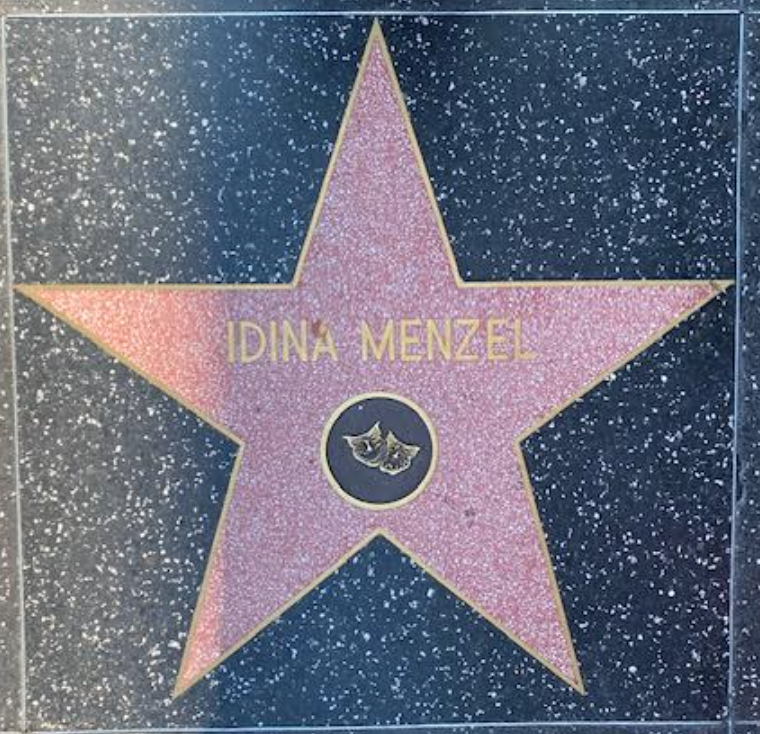
Menzel's star on the Hollywood Walk of Fame

Diana Bunici of Evoke.ie dubbed Menzel "the voice of the new generation". In 2014, Menzel was awarded "Breakthrough Artist" by Billboard. In 2019, Menzel and actress Kristen Bell, who plays her sister in Frozen, received neighboring stars—Menzel's was the 2682nd and Bell's was the 2681st—on the Hollywood Walk of Fame. Menzel was inducted into the live theatre category. Menzel is also among the wealthiest Broadway performers, due in part to her television, film and music careers. In 2022, Menzel was announced as a recipient of a Disney Legends Award for her outstanding contributions to the Walt Disney Company, with her D23 entry reading "Whether on stage or screen, Idina Menzel's unequivocal signature talents have shone through countless projects across her almost 30-year career". In October 2024, President Joe Biden awarded Menzel with the National Medal of Arts.

Menzel received an honorary doctorate from University of Pennsylvania in 2023.

== Personal life ==
Menzel married Taye Diggs on January 11, 2003. They met in 1995 during the original production of Rent, in which Diggs portrayed Benjamin Coffin III, the landlord. They appeared in several films together. On September 2, 2009, she gave birth to their son. In late 2013, it was reported that Menzel and Diggs had separated after 10 years of marriage. Menzel cited negative public reaction to the "interracial aspect" of their marriage as a factor in the divorce, as well as other unnamed "complicated reasons." The two continued to co-parent their son.

Menzel began dating actor Aaron Lohr, and in August 2015, they bought a home together in Encino, Los Angeles. On September 23, 2016, Menzel announced that she and Lohr were engaged. They were married September 22, 2017, in a backyard ceremony at their home.

Menzel identifies as a feminist, saying, "I love that I play all of these strong women. But they're not just strong—they're women who have a really deep vulnerability and need to go through a journey in order to harness their power."

== Philanthropy and other ventures ==
Menzel was an honorary chair of the Imperial Court of New York's Annual Charity Coronation Ball, Night of A Thousand Gowns, on March 21, 2009, sharing the title with Elton John, Patti LuPone, John Cameron Mitchell, Joan Rivers, and Robin Strasser.

On May 17, 2009, Menzel performed at a special benefit concert in Atlanta, Georgia, to raise money for the Pace Academy Diversity Program in coordination with the Ron Clark Academy. The event resulted in the funding of two scholarships for Ron Clark Academy students to attend Pace Academy. The event was organized and hosted by Philip McAdoo, a former Rent cast member and current Diversity Program Director at Pace Academy.

In 2010, Menzel founded the A BroaderWay Foundation with then-husband Taye Diggs as a means of supporting young people in the arts. A BroaderWay sponsors camp programs, theater workshops, and innovative educational programming, and offers scholarships and opportunities to experience professional performances. In Summer 2011, Camp BroaderWay welcomed girls from under-served metro New York communities to a 10-day performing arts camp, run by Menzel and a team of acclaimed professional Broadway artists including Taye Diggs. During this camp, the girls collaborated with Broadway artists to write an original musical that was performed at a theatre in New York. The camp was held at Belvoir Terrace Summer Camp in Lenox, Massachusetts.

Menzel has long championed LGBT rights by partnering with organizations like The Trevor Project, the Give A Damn Campaign (filming a public service announcement and designing a T-shirt) and the NOH8 Campaign, posing for one of their trademark duct-taped silence photos.

In April 2014, Menzel presented at Broadway Cares/Equity Fights AIDS Easter Bonnet Competition with Bryan Cranston, Fran Drescher, and Denzel Washington, after raising donations at her Broadway show If/Then.

In 2022, Menzel launched a clothing line with QVC called Encore by Idina Menzel. Also in 2022, Menzel co-wrote a children's book with her sister, Cara Mentzel, called Loud Mouse with illustrations by Jaclyn Sinquett. The book is semi-autobiographical about a mouse named Dee who loves to sing loudly. The book was published by Disney-Hyperion on September 27, 2022. In promotion of the book, Menzel released "The Loud Mouse Song", which she co-wrote with Laura Veltz, on September 23, 2022. In 2023, Menzel and her sister Cara Mentzel released a sequel to Loud Mouse, called Proud Mouse, with Jaclyn Sinquett returning for illustrations.

Following the October 7 attacks, on November 20, 2023, Menzel performed at AMIT's Evening of Solidarity with the Children of Israel in Sony Hall in Manhattan, recognizing donors who supported AMIT's network of religious Jewish educational institutions in Israel.

== Discography ==
- Still I Can't Be Still (1998)
- Here (2004)
- I Stand (2008)
- Holiday Wishes (2014)
- Idina (2016)
- Christmas: A Season of Love (2019)
- Drama Queen (2023)

== Concerts ==
First Date	Last Date	Title	# of Performances	Notes
November 3, 1998	November 24, 1998	Still I Can't Be Still Tour	12	
April 1, 2008	March 28, 2009	I Stand tour	50	Special guest appearances from Josh Groban and Ravi Coltrane. The January 15, 2009, concert at the Lincoln Center was filmed for a special on the PBS series Soundstage.
April 24, 2010	July 21, 2013	Barefoot at the Symphony Tour	101	Menzel was often accompanied by Marvin Hamlisch, as well as various symphonies including the Kitchener-Waterloo Symphony, Royal Philharmonic Orchestra, the New York Philharmonic, and the San Francisco Symphony. Some concerts featured guest appearances from Taye Diggs and various audience members. The performance in Toronto on March 6, 2012, was filmed for a PBS special and DVD and recorded for a live album.
May 30, 2015	October 3, 2015	World Tour	54	This is her first world tour. She held concerts in South Korea, Japan, the Netherlands, the Philippines, the UK, Ireland, the US, Belgium, and Canada.
March 29, 2017	September 3, 2017	Idina World Tour	57	This tour was in promotion for Menzel's 2016 self-titled idina. album. Performances in the US, Belgium, Netherlands, Ireland, Canada, Japan, and the UK.
October 18, 2018	November 18, 2018	Bridges Tour	18	Menzel was the Opening Act for the first North American leg. She later joined Josh Groban on two duets during his set.
December 6, 2019	December 11, 2019	A Season of Love Tour	3	In support of her second holiday album Christmas: A Season of Love
July 19, 2024	August 18, 2024	Take Me Or Leave Me Tour	21	Summer tour in support of her 2023 album Drama Queen. This tour will hit North America only. Special guest appearance from Adrienne Warren at Menzel's concert in New York City's Beacon Theatre.

=== Other ===
Date	Title	Notes
August 1998	Lilith Fair	August 6 show in Cleveland, August 8 show in Cincinnati, August 9 show in Pittsburgh, and August 10 show in Hershey.
December 7, 2000	SH-K-Boom's Cutting Room	
May/June 2001	Joe's Pub	Shows on May 12, 19, and June 2.
October 7, 2002	Ars Nova	
December 13, 2004	The Zipper Factory	Here promotional concert.
August 2005	Provincetown Theatre & Regatta Bar	August 18–21 in Provincetown, and 26 and 27 in Boston.
September 4, 2005	The Hot Tin Roof	
September 17, 2007	Hulu Theater	
January 29, 2008	Virgin Megastore	
July 19, 2010	A Broadway Celebration: In Performance at the White House	Other singers included Brian D'Arcy James, Elaine Stritch, Audra McDonald, and the touring cast of Hairspray. The concert aired on PBS on October 20, 2010. Menzel sang Defying Gravity and What I Did For Love.
June 16, 2014	Radio City Music Hall Concert	
November 27, 2014	iHeart Radio: Holiday Wishes	iHeart Radio had Menzel perform a concert that they used a TV/Radio special. The concert features a guest appearance from Menzel's fellow If/Then cast member Tamika Lawrence and promoted her new album, Holiday Wishes.
June 16, 2023	Rhode Island Pride	

== Awards and nominations ==
=== Theatre ===
Year	Award	Category	Nominated Work	Result
1995	Obie Award	Special Citations	Rent	Won
1996	Tony Award	Best Performance by a Featured Actress in a Musical	Rent	Nominated
2000	Drama Desk Award	Outstanding Featured Actress in a Musical	The Wild Party	Nominated
2004	Tony Award	Best Actress in a Musical	Wicked	Won
2004	Drama Desk Award	Outstanding Actress in a Musical	Wicked	Nominated
2004	Drama League Award	Distinguished Performance	Wicked	Nominated
2004	Outer Critics Circle Award	Outstanding Actress in a Musical	Wicked	Nominated
2004	Broadway.com Audience Award	Best Lead Actress in a Musical	Wicked	Won
2004	Broadway.com Audience Award	Best Diva Performance	Wicked	Won
2004	Broadway.com Audience Award	Best Onstage Pair (w/ Kristin Chenoweth)	Wicked	Won
2005	Drama Desk Award	Best Lead Actress in a Musical	See What I Wanna See	Nominated
2005	Drama League Award	Distinguished Performance	See What I Wanna See	Nominated
2005	Broadway.com Audience Award	Favorite Diva Performance	See What I Wanna See	Nominated
2005	Broadway.com Audience Award	Favorite Ensemble Performance	See What I Wanna See	Nominated
2006	Whatsonstage.com Theatregoers Choice Award	Best Actress in a Musical	Wicked	Won
2014	Tony Award	Best Performance by a Leading Actress in a Musical	If/Then	Nominated
2014	Drama League Award	Distinguished Performance	If/Then	Nominated
2014	Drama Desk Award	Outstanding Actress in a Musical	If/Then	Nominated
2014	Broadway.com Audience Award	Best Leading Actress in a Musical	If/Then	Won
2014	Broadway.com Audience Award	Best Onstage Pair (w/ James Snyder)	If/Then	Won
2014	Broadway.com Audience Award	Best Diva Performance	If/Then	Nominated
2018	Drama League Award	Distinguished Achievement in Musical Theatre		Honoree
2025	Drama League Award	Distinguished Performance	Redwood	Nominated
2025	Broadway.com Audience Choice Award	Favorite Diva Performance	Redwood	Nominated

=== Film ===
Year	Award	Category	Nominated work	Result
2005	Washington D.C. Area Film Critics Association	Best Ensemble	Rent	Nominated
2005	Broadcast Film Critics Association Award	Best Acting Ensemble	Rent	Nominated
2005	Broadcast Film Critics Association Award	Best Song Performance	Rent	Nominated
2013	Alliance of Women Film Journalists	Best Animated Female	Frozen	Nominated
2014	World Music Award	Best Song Written for Film	Frozen	Won
2014	Teen Choice Award	Choice Music: Single	Frozen	Nominated
2014	Teen Choice Award	Choice Actress: Voice	Frozen	Won
2014	Billboard Music Award	Top Streaming Video	Frozen	Nominated
2014	Billboard Music Award	Top Soundtrack	Frozen	Won
2014	American Music Awards	Top Soundtrack	Frozen	Won
2020	Teen Choice Awards	Favorite Voice Actress	Frozen 2	Nominated

=== Television ===
Year	Award	Category	Nominated work	Result
2010	Teen Choice Award	Choice Music: Group	Glee	Nominated
2023	Daytime Emmy Awards	Outstanding Daytime Special (as a host)	Recipe for Change: Standing up to Anti-Semitism	Won

== See also ==
- List of Jewish American entertainers
- List of barefooters
