= Idina (album) =

Studio album by Idina Menzel
- Released: September 23, 2016
- Genre: Pop
- Length: 45:36
- Label: Warner Bros.
- Producer: Greg Wells; Eric Rosse

Idina Menzel chronology
Holiday Wishes (2014)	Idina (2016)	Christmas: A Season of Love (2019)

Singles from Idina
- 1. "I See You" Released: August 5, 2016; 2. "Queen of Swords" Released: August 20, 2016; 3. "Small World" Released: September 9, 2016; 4. "Perfect Story" Released: September 15, 2016

Idina (stylized as idina.) is the fifth studio album by American singer Idina Menzel. It was released on September 23, 2016, by Warner Bros. Records.

== Background ==
In late 2015, Menzel announced via Twitter and in interviews that she was working on a new studio album, set to be released in Fall 2016. On August 5, 2016 at midnight, Menzel appeared on Facebook Live from the Skylark Rooftop in New York City to announce that the album would be released on September 23, 2016, and gave a world premiere performance of her single "I See You". The album marked Menzel's return to pop music, and was described by ABC News as her first proper pop effort since 2008's I Stand.

== Promotion ==
The week after she announced the album, Menzel appeared on Facebook Live again from The Berkshires with her all-girl performing arts camp, A Broader Way, where she gave another sneak preview of a song from the album titled "Queen of Swords" along with the campers. The song was released as a single several days later. Music videos for both "I See You" and "Queen of Swords" were posted to her YouTube channel. Menzel shared her thoughts with People about the inspiration behind the album, reflecting on how her personal and professional experiences shaped its creation: "This album in particular, I had so much that I wanted to say. I had been through so much over the last couple of years simultaneously — going through a divorce, and all of the sadness and regret that that brought about, while experiencing this incredible professional success with Frozen and the Oscars and singing at the Super Bowl", she adds. "It was such an interesting, complicated couple of years that I just knew that it was a really rich time for me to get in the studio and put all of that down in music".

The album was supported the following year by Idina World Tour, which played in over 50+ cities across North America, Europe, and Asia.

== Critical reception ==
Idina ratings
Review scores
Source	Rating
AllMusic	3.5/5 stars
Newsday	B+

The album received fairly positive reviews from music critics. AllMusic awarded it 3.5 stars, saying she was able to "craft a sound that's expansive enough to resonate with fans of her stage work while adding a bit of a modern age", particularly drawing attention to "Queen of Swords", "Cake", and "I Do". The review also noted that the album was very personal and was a vast improvement on her last pop album, I Stand. Newsday gave the album a B+, noting her "gorgeous voice" and mentioning "Queen of Swords", "I See You", and "Perfect Story" as stand-out ptracks. ABC News called the album a collection of "inspirational ballads", pointing to "I See You" as a track aimed at uplifting "the forgotten" and "those who got lost along the way". While acknowledging that such themes could verge on overly sentimental, the review noted that the song's "Dear Prudence"-like energy grounded its emotional tone.

== Commercial performance ==
Idina debuted at number 29 on the Billboard 200 chart, selling 15,000 album-equivalent units in its first week, including 14,000 pure sales. Additionally, the album peaked at number 9 on the Billboard Top Album Sales chart.

== Track listing ==
Idina – Standard edition
No.	Title	Writer(s)	Producer(s)	Length
1.	"Small World"	Ross Golan; Greg Wells	Wells	3:35
2.	"Like Lightning"	Idina Menzel; Audra Mae; Eric Rosse	Rosse	3:39
3.	"Queen of Swords"	Menzel; Ferras Alqaisi; Sarah Hudson; Wells	Wells	4:20
4.	"I See You"	Andy Hollander; Matt Morris	Rosse	3:39
5.	"Everybody Knows"	Wells; Stephen Wrabel	Wells	3:25
6.	"Show Me"	Menzel; James Abrahart; Wells	Wells	5:02
7.	"Last Time"	Menzel; Rosse; Sasha Sloan	Rosse	3:57
8.	"I Do"	Menzel; Rosse; Sloan	Rosse	3:29
9.	"Cake"	Menzel; Shelly Peiken; Wells	Wells	2:54
10.	"Extraordinary"	Menzel; Lindy Robbins; Wells	Wells	3:33
11.	"Perfect Story"	Menzel; Wells; Nina Woodford	Wells	3:39
12.	"Nothin' in This World"	Menzel; Connor Pledger; Rosse	Rosse	4:24
Total length:				45:36

Idina – Target edition
No.	Title	Writer(s)	Length
13.	"Bitter Core"	Menzel; Mae; Rosse	3:05
14.	"Stronger Than Hate"	Angela Lauer; Butterfly Boucher; Jamie Moore	2:46
Total length:			51:36

Idina – Japanese edition
No.	Title	Length
15.	"Blind"	4:02
Total length:		55:38

== Charts ==
Chart performance for Idina
Chart (2016)	Peak position
Belgian Albums (Ultratop Flanders)	129
Scottish Albums (OCC)	47
UK Albums (OCC)	86
US Billboard 200	29
