= Here (Idina Menzel album) =

Studio album by Idina Menzel
- Released: February 24, 2004
- Recorded: 1999–2004
- Length: 23:22
- Label: Zel
- Producer: Jamey Jaz

Idina Menzel chronology
Still I Can't Be Still (1998)	Here (2004)	I Stand (2008)

Here is the second studio album by American singer-actress Idina Menzel. Unable to find acting gigs, Menzel began recording the album in 1999, but was dropped by Hollywood Records after her previous album Still I Can't Be Still failed commercially. In 2004, Menzel self-released Here, despite it being incomplete.

While Menzel was performing in Wicked which earned her a big rise to fame, she sold copies of the album at the Gershwin Theatre. The album has sold around 2,000 copies.

To promote the album, Menzel performed a one night only concert at the Zipper Theatre in NYC on December 13, 2004 (on a dark night from Wicked) entitled Idina: For My Friends. Following filming the film version of Rent in 2005, she performed a set of mini concerts in Massachusetts including the Provincetown Theatre, Regetta Bar, and the Hot Tin Roof.

== Track listing ==
1. "Here" – 3:39
2. "You'd Be Surprised" – 4:31
3. "If I Told You" – 4:00
4. "Penny" – 4:02
5. "Once Upon A Time" – 3:46
6. "So Beautiful" – 3:27

== Credits and personnel ==
- Vocals – Idina Menzel
- Production: Jamey Jaz
