= Still I Can't Be Still =

Studio album by Idina Menzel
- Released: September 15, 1998
- Recorded: 1996–1998
- Genre: Pop rock
- Length: 52:45
- Label: Hollywood
- Producer: Milton Davis, Florian Ammon

Idina Menzel chronology
Still I Can't Be Still (1998)	Here (2004)

Professional ratings
Review scores
Source	Rating
AllMusic	3.5/5 stars

Still I Can't Be Still is Idina Menzel's debut album, recorded and released in 1998. While wowing audiences in the original production of Rent, Menzel was offered a record deal with Hollywood Records. After selling less than 10,000 copies in the US and missing the Billboard 200, Menzel's label put the album out of print, and she was dropped from the label. However, demand for the album grew significantly after Menzel rose to a greater fame with her Tony-winning performance in Wicked, and was subsequently re-released in September 2005.

One single from the album, "Minuet," reached No. 48 on Radio & Records' CHR/Pop tracks chart in October 1998. As of March 2014, the album has sold 18,000 copies in the United States.

== Track listing ==
All songs written by Idina Menzel and Milton Davis.

1. "Minuet" – 4:18
2. "Larissa's Lagoon" – 4:18
3. "Follow If You Lead" – 4:08
4. "All of the Above" – 4:47
5. "Still I Can't Be Still" – 4:59
6. "Think Too Much" – 4:40
7. "Planet Z" – 3:57
8. "Fool Out of Me" – 4:27
9. "Reach" – 5:34
10. "Straw Into Gold" – 5:22
11. "Heart on My Sleeve" – 6:21

== Personnel ==
- Vocals - Idina Menzel
- Production - Milton Davis, Florian Ammon
