= Holiday Wishes =

Studio album by Idina Menzel
- Released: October 14, 2014
- Recorded: 2014
- Studio: Capitol (Hollywood)
- Genre: Christmas
- Length: 48:34
- Label: Warner Bros.
- Producer: Walter Afanasieff, Rob Mounsey

Idina Menzel chronology
Live: Barefoot at the Symphony (2012)	Holiday Wishes (2014)	Idina (2016)

Holiday Wishes (also titled Christmas Wishes in the UK and Snow Wishes in Japan) is the fourth studio album and the first Christmas album by American singer-songwriter and actress Idina Menzel. Produced by Walter Afanasieff, it was released by Warner Bros. Records on October 14, 2014, in the United States, and on November 3 in the United Kingdom. It is Menzel's fourth studio album to date, as well as her first in six years, and features a duet with Canadian singer Michael Bublé.

== Background ==
During her one night only concert at Radio City Music Hall, Menzel revealed details about the album, and indicated that the track "December Prayer" would be an original song. She also added, in regard to her Jewish religion, "I know I'm Jewish. But a lot of famous Jewish people have written Christmas songs, so I'm going to try out some of their songs on the album." Although it is the only song in the album that was written by Menzel, the song "December Prayer" is a cover of the Yvonne Catterfeld song. Catterfeld's original rendition was included on her 2010 album Blau im Blau.

== Content and composition ==
According to Menzel, Holiday Wishes consists of mostly "songs that I've always wanted to sing." The album begins with a cover of the holiday standard "Do You Hear What I Hear?", the recording of which was inspired by the late singer Whitney Houston's rendition. The fifth song is a cover of "All I Want for Christmas Is You", which was originally recorded and made famous by R&B singer Mariah Carey. Menzel opted to record the track using an arrangement that producer Walter Afanasieff, who co-wrote and produced Carey's version, had never been able to use before.

The seventh track "December Prayer" is the only original song featured on the album, which has been described by Randy Lewis of the Los Angeles Times as a "reflection about a soldier finding his way home for the holidays."

== Reception ==
Professional ratings
Review scores
Source	Rating
AllMusic	4/5 stars

Holiday Wishes has garnered positive reviews from music critics. Stephen Thomas Erlewine of AllMusic concluded, "Unsurprising though it may be, Holiday Wishes nevertheless is satisfying because producer Walter Afanasieff commits to his Christmas classicism, as does Menzel. Everything here sparkles with the gleam of freshly fallen snow: it's big, bright, and so stubbornly out of fashion that it'd never go out of style." Praising Menzel's vocal performance, the Los Angeles Times' Randy Lewis wrote that the singer "brings a stocking-full of interpretive skill to some holiday classics." Lewis opined that despite "conventional" arrangements, "Menzel's tone and phrasing are consistently lovely."

== Commercial performance ==
Upon its release, Holiday Wishes debuted at number 13 on the Billboard 200 albums chart with sales of 20,000 copies, making it the highest-charting solo album of her career. In its sixth week on the chart, the album sold 33,000 copies and reached a new peak of number 10, making it Menzel's first ever solo album to reach the top 10 on the Billboard 200. With sales of 370,000, Holiday Wishes was 2014's second best-selling holiday album, behind That's Christmas to Me by Pentatonix. On December 20, 2014, the album peaked at number 6 on the Billboard 200.

== Track listing ==
- All tracks produced by Walter Afanasieff, except "When You Wish upon a Star" produced by Rob Mounsey.

Holiday Wishes / Christmas Wishes – Standard edition
No.	Title	Writer(s)	Length
1.	"Do You Hear What I Hear"	Noel Regney, Gloria Shayne Baker	3:45
2.	"The Christmas Song"	Bob Wells, Mel Tormé	3:32
3.	"Baby It's Cold Outside" (duet with Michael Bublé)	Frank Loesser	2:46
4.	"Have Yourself a Merry Little Christmas"	Ralph Blane, Hugh Martin	5:43
5.	"All I Want for Christmas Is You" (featuring Kenny G)	Mariah Carey, Walter Afanasieff	5:12
6.	"What Are You Doing New Year's Eve?"	Loesser	4:36
7.	"December Prayer"	Afanasieff, Idina Menzel, Charlie Midnight	4:50
8.	"When You Wish Upon a Star"	Leigh Harline, Ned Washington	3:00
9.	"Silent Night"	Franz Xaver Gruber, Joseph Mohr	4:30
10.	"River"	Joni Mitchell	4:01
11.	"Holly Jolly Christmas"	Johnny Marks	2:27
12.	"White Christmas" (featuring Kenny G)	Irving Berlin	4:12

Holiday Wishes / Christmas Wishes – Deluxe edition (bonus tracks) (Note: Exclusive to Target in the US and Amazon in the UK.)
No.	Title	Writer(s)	Length
13.	"Mother's Spiritual"	Laura Nyro	4:19
14.	"Let It Snow, Let It Snow, Let It Snow"	Sammy Cahn, Jule Styne	2:41

Snow Wishes – Japanese edition
No.	Title	Writer(s)	Length
1.	"Do You Hear What I Hear"	Noel Regney, Gloria Shayne Baker	3:45
2.	"The Christmas Song"	Bob Wells, Mel Tormé	3:32
3.	"Christmas Eve" (bonus track)	Tatsuro Yamashita, Alan O'Day	3:38
4.	"Baby It's Cold Outside" (duet with Michael Bublé)	Frank Loesser	2:46
5.	"Have Yourself a Merry Little Christmas"	Ralph Blane, Hugh Martin	5:43
6.	"All I Want for Christmas Is You" (featuring Kenny G)	Mariah Carey, Walter Afanasieff	5:12
7.	"What Are You Doing New Year's Eve?"	Loesser	4:36
8.	"December Prayer"	Afanasieff, Idina Menzel, Charlie Midnight	4:50
9.	"When You Wish Upon a Star"	Leigh Harline, Ned Washington	3:00
10.	"Silent Night"	Franz Xaver Gruber, Joseph Mohr	4:30
11.	"River"	Joni Mitchell	4:01
12.	"Holly Jolly Christmas"	Johnny Marks	2:27
13.	"White Christmas" (featuring Kenny G)	Irving Berlin	4:12
14.	"Mother's Spiritual"	Laura Nyro	4:19
15.	"Let It Snow, Let It Snow, Let It Snow"	Sammy Cahn, Jule Styne	2:41

== Personnel ==
- Idina Menzel – lead vocals
- Walter Afanasieff – production, arrangements, keyboards
- Rob Mounsey – production
- William Ross – arrangements
- Jorge Calandrelli – arrangements
- David Reitzas – mixing
- Nathan East – bass guitar
- Vinnie Colaiuta – drums
- Paul Jackson Jr. – guitar
- Dennis Budimir – guitar
- Randy Waldman – piano
- Kenny G – saxophone
- Kent Smith – trumpet solo
- Michael Bublé – vocal duet
- Missi Hale – backing vocals
- Luke Edgemon – backing vocals
- Monét Owens – backing vocals
- Tyler Gordon – engineering, programming
- David Reitzas – engineering
- Adrian Bradford – engineering
- Tommy Vicari – orchestral engineering
- Larry Mah – orchestral engineering
- Courtney Blooding – production coordination
- Norman Wonderly – creative direction
- Ruven Afandor – photography

== Charts ==
=== Weekly charts ===
Chart (2014)	Peak position
Australian Albums (ARIA)	55
Canadian Albums (Billboard)	17
UK Albums (OCC)	42
US Billboard 200	6

=== Year-end charts ===
Chart (2015)	Position
US Billboard 200	100

== Certifications ==
Region	Certification	Certified units/sales
United States (RIAA)	Gold	500,000^{‡}
^{‡} Sales+streaming figures based on certification alone.
