= Redwood (musical) =

- The 2025 Broadway Playbill cover
- Music: Kate Diaz
- Lyrics: Kate Diaz; Tina Landau
- Book: Tina Landau
- Premiere: February 25, 2024: La Jolla Playhouse
- Productions: 2024 La Jolla Playhouse; 2025 Broadway

Redwood is a musical with music by Kate Diaz and lyrics by Diaz and Tina Landau and a book by Landau, inspired by the life of Julia Butterfly Hill. The show tells the story of Jesse, a woman who, after her son's death, leaves her wife and work, drives across the US to the redwood forest, and forms a relationship with a giant redwood.

This musical, with music composed by Kate Diaz and lyrics co-written by Diaz and Tina Landau, explores themes of mourning, love, healing, and humanity’s connection to nature. Inspired by Landau’s personal experience of losing a family member to fentanyl-laced drugs, Redwood blends emotional storytelling with evocative music to deliver a powerful message of hope and renewal amid deep loss.

The show premiered in 2024 at the La Jolla Playhouse in California and opened on Broadway on February 13, 2025. The musical was originally conceived by Landau and Idina Menzel. It closed on May 18, 2025.

== Synopsis ==
Jesse is a successful businesswoman and mother. Her son, Spencer, dies suddenly from an accidental overdose of drugs laced with fentanyl. Struggling deeply with guilt over her neglect of Spencer, Jesse tries to avoid processing her pain while her wife, Mel, wants to grieve openly and remember their son, causing tension in their marriage.

Overwhelmed by anguish and feelings of helplessness, Jesse abruptly leaves her home and career, embarking on a solitary journey to the redwood forests of Northern California. There, she meets two arborists, Finn and Becca, and forms complex relationships with them and a particular redwood tree. The natural setting becomes a place of healing and self-discovery for Jesse, with the redwood tree symbolizing resilience, patience, and renewal.

== Productions ==
=== San Diego (2024) ===
Previews for Redwood began on February 13, 2024, at the La Jolla Playhouse. The premiere opened on February 25 and closed on March 31, 2024. It featured direction by Tina Landau with orchestrations and arrangements by Kate Diaz, scenic design by Jason Ardizzone-West, costume design by Toni-Leslie James, lighting design by Scott Zielinski, and sound design by Jonathan Deans.

=== Broadway (2025) ===
Previews of the Broadway run began on January 24, 2025, at the Nederlander Theatre (where Menzel had performed in Rent), before an official opening on February 13.

Reviews on Broadway were mixed to mildly positive, with praise for Menzel's vocals, the supporting cast's performances, and the set design. Critics were generally disappointed by the use of video projections, the pacing of the book, and what they viewed as excessively sentimental and predictable lyrics and ideas throughout the piece. Redwood closed on May 18, 2025, after 127 performances including 17 previews; the closure was announced one day after the musical failed to receive any Tony Award nominations.

== Musical numbers and instrumentation ==
The Broadway production employs two keyboards with keyboard 2 doubling on guitar, acoustic guitar and electric bass, drum set, two violins, one viola, and one cello.

- "Drive" - Jesse, Mel, Spencer
- "The Trees"
- "Climb" - Jesse, Becca, Finn
- "Little Redwood" - Becca
- "The Stars" - Jesse
- "A Dream" - Spencer, Mel, Jesse
- "Big Tree Religion" - Finn, Becca, Jesse
- "Back Then" - Mel, Jesse
- "The Ascent"
- "Great Escape" - Jesse
- "Roots" - Finn
- "Little Redwood (Reprise)" - Finn, Becca, Jesse
- "Looking Through This Lens" - Mel
- "In the Leaves" - Jesse, Stella
- "Becca's Song" - Becca
- "No Repair" - Jesse
- "The Fires" - Jesse
- "Still" - Spencer, Jesse, Stella, The Trees
- "Finale" - All

== Characters and original cast ==
Character	San Diego	Broadway
Character	2024	2025
Jesse	Idina Menzel	Idina Menzel
Mel	De'Adre Aziza	De'Adre Aziza
Spencer, Clerk, Man in Rain, Mateo	Zachary Noah Piser	Zachary Noah Piser
Finn	Michael Park	Michael Park
Becca	Nkeki Obi-Melekwe	Khaila Wilcoxon
Vocals for Stella, The Trees	Kate Diaz	Kate Diaz
