= If/Then =

Musical by Brian Yorkey and Tom Kitt

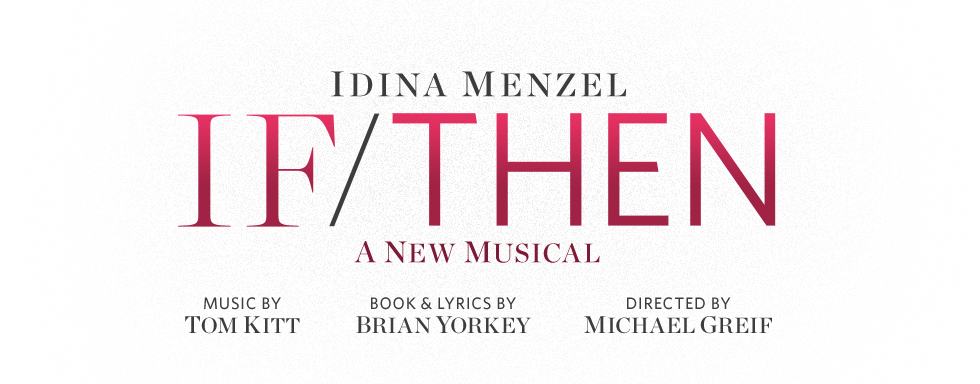
- Original Logo
- Music: Tom Kitt
- Lyrics: Brian Yorkey
- Book: Brian Yorkey
- Setting: New York City
- Premiere: March 30, 2014: Richard Rodgers Theatre
- Productions: 2013 Washington, D.C. 2014 Broadway; 2015 US Tour; 2022 South Korea

If/Then is a musical with a libretto by Brian Yorkey and a theatrical score by Tom Kitt, directed by Michael Greif. It tells the story of a 38-year-old woman named Elizabeth who moves back to New York City for a fresh start.

If/Then began previews on Broadway at the Richard Rodgers Theatre on March 5, 2014, opened on March 30, 2014, and closed on March 22, 2015, a total of 401 performances and 29 previews. The cast recording was released by Masterworks Broadway on June 3, 2014, and debuted at number 19 on the Billboard 200, the highest-charting Broadway cast recording since the cast recording of The Book of Mormon was released in 2011.

If/Then started its national tour in Denver, Colorado, on October 13, 2015. On January 27, 2016, Jackie Burns replaced Idina Menzel as Elizabeth for the remainder of the tour.

== Productions ==
After a developmental lab in April 2013, featuring Idina Menzel and directed by Michael Greif, If/Then staged an out-of-town tryout at the National Theatre, Washington, D.C. from November 5 to December 8, 2013.

The musical began previews on Broadway at the Richard Rodgers Theatre on March 5, 2014, and officially opened on March 30. The production was directed by Greif, with choreography by Larry Keigwin, sets by Mark Wendland, costumes by Emily Rebholz, lighting by Kenneth Posner, and orchestrations by Michael Starobin. The original cast included Menzel as Elizabeth, LaChanze as Kate, James Snyder as Josh, and Anthony Rapp as Lucas, along with Tamika Sonja Lawrence, Jenn Colella, Jerry Dixon, and Jason Tam. A national tour, with Menzel again in the starring role, began in Denver in October 2015.

A South Korean production played in Hongik Daehakro Art Center Grand Theater from December 8, 2022 to February 26, 2023.

In February 2025 a two-night staged concert of the musical was performed for in London at the Savoy Theatre. The production starred Kerry Ellis as Beth/Liz, David Hunter as Lucas and Adam Garcia as Josh.

== Synopsis ==
38-year-old divorcee Elizabeth moves back to her hometown of New York City to start her life anew. Her kindergarten teacher friend Kate suggests she adopt the nickname Liz and attend a concert, while her activist friend Lucas suggests she return to her college nickname of Beth and join him at a rally. The work switches back and forth between the two possible timelines.

Liz meets an army doctor named Josh, and after a brief hesitation, falls in love with him. Josh introduces Lucas to his friend David, and they too begin a relationship. Liz and Josh have two children, but Josh, having delayed his third tour of duty as long as possible, is deployed and killed in action. Meanwhile, Kate's marriage ends in divorce, and David encourages Liz to confront her loss.

Beth, having brushed off Josh, receives a call from her former classmate Stephen, who offers her a job as a city planner. After an awkward kiss with Stephen, Beth invites Lucas over, and they have sex. Lucas is in love with Beth, but she is not interested in him. Beth learns she is pregnant with Lucas's child, but opts to get an abortion, ruining their friendship. Years pass, and Beth throws herself into work while remaining lonely. After a harrowing near-death experience, Beth urges Kate and Anne to make up and love each other while they can.

Five years after the opening scene, Liz and Beth both meet their friends in the park. Liz reconnects with Stephen, who has a job opportunity for her, while Beth meets Josh, back from his originally scheduled third tour of duty. Both women take the new opportunity and face the future.

== Musical numbers ==
Act I

- "Prologue / What If?" - Elizabeth, Busker, Kate, Lucas, Josh and Company
- "It's a Sign" – Kate and Passengers
- "A Map of New York" – Stephen, Beth, Kate and Company
- "You Never Know" – Josh
- "Ain't No Man Manhattan" – Lucas and Activists
- "What The Fuck?" – Elizabeth
- "Here I Go" – Liz and Josh
- "You Don't Need to Love Me" – Lucas
- "No More Wasted Time" † – Beth, Kate, Anne, Elena
- "Surprise" – Company

Act II

- "This Day / Walking by a Wedding" – Kate, Anne, Liz, Josh, and Company
- "Hey, Kid" – Josh
- "Some Other Me" – Beth and Lucas
- "Best Worst Mistake" – Lucas and David
- "I Hate You" – Liz and Josh
- "A Map of New York (Reprise)" – Stephen
- "You Learn to Live Without" – Elizabeth
- "The Moment Explodes" ‡ – Beth, Architect, Flight Attendant, Passengers
- "Love While You Can" * – Beth, Kate, Anne
- "What Would You Do?" – David
- "Always Starting Over" – Liz
- "Finale / What If? (Reprise)" – Company

† In the pre-Broadway production, this song is not performed; instead, "The Story of Dick and Jane", was performed by Kate and company
‡ In the pre-Broadway production, this song is moved and performed between "This Day / Walking By A Wedding" and "Hey Kid"
* In the pre-Broadway production, this song is not performed; instead, a different version of "No More Wasted Time", was performed by Kate and Anne

== Notable casts ==
| Role | Broadway (2014) | National Tour (2015) |
|---|---|---|
| Elizabeth Vaughn | Idina Menzel | Idina Menzel |
| Kate | LaChanze | LaChanze |
| Lucas | Anthony Rapp | Anthony Rapp |
| Josh Barton | James Snyder | James Snyder |
| Stephen | Jerry Dixon | Daren A. Herbert |
| Anne | Jenn Colella | Janine DiVita |
| David | Jason Tam | Marc de la Cruz |
| Elena | Tamika Lawrence | Kyra Faith |
| Deputy Mayor and others | Joe Cassidy | Corey Greenan |
| A Bartender and others | Miguel Cervantes | Cliffton Hall |
| A Soldier and others | Curtis Holbrook | Xavier Cano |
| A Flight Attendant and others | Stephanie Klemons | Alicia Taylor Tomasko |
| A Street Musician and others | Tyler McGee | Tyler McGee |
| Paulette and others | Ryann Redmond | English Bernhardt |
| An Architect and others | Joe Aaron Reid | Corey Greenan |
| Cathy and others | Ann Sanders | Deedee Magno Hall |

== Reception ==
While at the National Theatre, Peter Marks, reviewing for The Washington Post praised Menzel, calling her "an earthy star with heavenly pipes" but said the play makes "it difficult to determine at any given moment which of the stories of Elizabeth's fate we're in". Marks noted that the show has the ingredients that it needs for success: "It's a winning blob, and it provides a lot of engaging elements, from Mark Wendland's becoming minimalist set, with rotating skeletons of city apartments and handsome retractable fire escapes, to Emily Rebholz's sleek and taste-drenched costumes. The score — a far sunnier composition than the songwriters worked out for their Pulitzer Prize-winning musical about mental illness, 'Next to Normal' — gives Tony-winner Menzel the power ballads in which her fans from 'Wicked' and 'Rent' will exult."

The Broadway production received primarily mixed reviews, with the consensus being that the cast shone, but the score and book were still unclear. Ben Brantley of The New York Times gave a mixed review but stated that Idina Menzel "brings an anxious intensity to a featherweight part". Mark Kennedy of ABC News said, "An uneven — maybe not completely finished — show opened Sunday at the Richard Rodgers Theatre with an intriguing, ambitious premise and a leading lady with a shockingly good voice, but a clumsy story and too few impressive songs". Peter Marks of The Washington Post summed up his review with, "If/Then is an enjoyable, beautifully sung, at times deeply touching experience, built on a structure that never completely works." Robert Hofler of The Wrap gave an optimistic review, comparing the show's non-traditional structure to Stephen Sondheim's Company, saying "Today, audiences seeing those classic shows understand perfectly what's going on. Audiences seeing them in the original productions – take it from me – were very confused and exasperated" and that "...it's an intriguing book, but one that Yorkey might tinker with beyond opening night, just as the books of 'Merrily We Roll Along' and 'Follies' went through many revisions after their respective Broadway premieres. In other words, see 'If/Then' now so you can have the fun of making comparisons to its future revivals, of which there will be many". Elysa Gardner of USA Today was positive, writing, "Yorkey's book and lyrics match the probing compassion of Normal without indulging in that show's preciousness. The characters here are more accessible and likable, from James Snyder's rugged but tender Josh to Anthony Rapp's wry Lucas, Elizabeth's longtime friend. LaChanze brings infectious verve to the role of Kate, a lesbian schoolteacher who evolves from a stock comic-buddy type into a compelling individual. As for the leading lady, Menzel seems both grounded and energized by the opportunity to play a grownup who learns that there really are no ever-afters. There is poignance in that discovery, but a sense of liberation as well, and If/Then captures both to moving, invigorating effect."

Despite mixed reviews, the show enjoyed strong box-office returns. During its first full week of performances, the show debuted in the top 10 with $931,268. The show was highlighted by Entertainment Weekly as one of the hits of the 2013–2014 season. By the last week of April the show was playing to over 97% capacity and was noted as one of the two highest-grossing new musicals. In May, If/Then was noted by Variety as being one of "the spring openers that have shown box office strength all along," and was still bringing in over a million dollars at the box-office every week. Also in May, Deadline Hollywood highlighted the fact that If/Then was defying the odds as one of the few original musicals to perform strongly in recent years, with most original musicals only lasting around a month. Deadline.com went on to comment on the strength of Menzel's name and fan-base as being behind the show's financial success. Nevertheless, the production likely closed at a loss.

== Streaming series ==
While the show was on Broadway, James Snyder hosted a Broadway.com vlog titled Hey Kid showing what went on backstage. The series was originally expected to run for an eight episode single season, but was extended to 12 episodes due to popularity, before being extended again. It ended up running for three seasons, or 24 episodes, making it one of the longest-running Broadway.com vlogs ever.

== Awards and nominations ==
| Year | Award Ceremony | Category | Nominee | Result |
|---|---|---|---|---|
| 2014 | Tony Award | Best Original Score | Tom Kitt and Brian Yorkey | Nominated |
| 2014 | Tony Award | Best Lead Actress in a Musical | Idina Menzel | Nominated |
| 2014 | Drama Desk Award | Outstanding Actress in a Musical | Idina Menzel | Nominated |
| 2014 | Drama Desk Award | Outstanding Orchestrations | Michael Starobin | Nominated |
| 2014 | Outer Critics Circle Award | Outstanding New Score (Broadway or Off-Broadway) | Tom Kitt and Brian Yorkey | Nominated |
| 2014 | Drama League Award | Distinguished Performance | Idina Menzel | Nominated |
