= Rent (soundtrack) =

2005 soundtrack album

Rent (Original Motion Picture Soundtrack)

Soundtrack album by cast of Rent
- Released: September 23, 2005
- Recorded: 2004–2005
- Genres: Show tunes; rock; soul
- Length: 95:00
- Label: Warner Bros.
- Producer: Rob Cavallo

Singles from Rent (Original Motion Picture Soundtrack)
- 1. "Seasons of Love" Released: August 2, 2005

Rent (Original Motion Picture Soundtrack) is the soundtrack to the 2005 musical drama film Rent, based on Jonathan Larson's 1996 Broadway musical of the same name, in turn based on Giacomo Puccini's 1896 opera La bohème. The musical numbers performed by the cast including Anthony Rapp, Adam Pascal, Jesse L. Martin, Wilson Jermaine Heredia, Idina Menzel, Taye Diggs, Tracie Thoms and Rosario Dawson. The soundtrack to the film was released by Warner Bros. Records on September 23, 2005.

== Background ==
Chris Columbus admitted that he was a fan of the original cast album. However, he felt that as the cast album was recorded in three days and the show was ongoing, hence they had a lot of technical problems with the album. He was unhappy with the tracks "Rent" and "Out Tonight" as they are of poor quality and are stronger rock and roll numbers which would have much power if being stemmed. He further thought it leaned slightly "a little too far to the Broadway side of it" which was closer to a really strong rock and roll record. He collaborated with Green Day's record producer Rob Cavallo after listening to the band's 2004 album American Idiot, which he called it as "one of the best sounding rock records I've heard in the last ten years". He further met Cavallo and asked whether he would be interested in doing the film, which he agreed to do so. Jonathan Larson's "Love Heals", which was not used in the Broadway production, was included in the film as well as in the soundtrack.

== Reception ==
The music was well received by critics. William Ruhlmann of AllMusic felt that "the soundtrack takes a close second to the original cast recording", praising the vocals, production and recording and rated 4 out of 5 to the album. The Harvard Crimson writer Maura A. Graul also gave 4 out of 5 stars admitting that the soundtrack "delivers a fresh sound from a group of refreshed veterans, as good as they have ever been".

Calling the soundtrack as a "potent mixture of show-tune pop, rock, funk, even tango", Orlando Sentinel called "Seasons of Love", "La Vie Boheme" and "Love Heals" as "clear standouts" of the album. Writing for Today, John Hartl criticised the film's music, saying "A musical lives or dies on the strength of its songs, and the late Jonathan Larson’s rock tunes for Rent simply don’t measure up. The music is more bombastic than melodic; the lyrics are banal and gratingly predictable — an affliction they share with much of the dialogue. Despite its Pulitzer and its Tonys, and despite one catchy number ("Seasons of Love"), it fails to soar."

== Track listing ==
Disc 1
| No. | Title | Artist(s) | Length |
|---|---|---|---|
| 1. | "Seasons Of Love" | Jesse L. Martin, Tracie Thoms, Rosario Dawson, Adam Pascal, Wilson Jermaine Heredia and Anthony Rapp | 3:02 |
| 2. | "Rent" | Anthony Rapp, Adam Pascal, Jesse L. Martin and Taye Diggs | 3:58 |
| 3. | "You'll See" | Adam Pascal, Anthony Rapp and Taye Diggs | 2:14 |
| 4. | "One Song Glory" | Adam Pascal | 2:46 |
| 5. | "Light My Candle" | Adam Pascal and Rosario Dawson | 4:09 |
| 6. | "Today 4 U" | Anthony Rapp, Jesse L. Martin and Wilson Jermaine Heredia | 2:45 |
| 7. | "Tango: Maureen" | Anthony Rapp, Tracie Thoms | 3:55 |
| 8. | "Life Support" | Aaron Lohr, Adam Pascal, Jesse L. Martin, Wilson Jermaine Heredia, Wayne Wilcox, Daniel London, Bianca Sams, Heather Barberie and Liisa Cohen | 0:56 |
| 9. | "Out Tonight" | Rosario Dawson | 3:55 |
| 10. | "Another Day" | Adam Pascal, Anthony Rapp, Jesse L. Martin, Rosario Dawson and Wilson Jermaine Heredia | 4:47 |
| 11. | "Will I" | Aaron Lohr, Adam Pascal, Anthony Rapp, Jesse L. Martin, Wilson Jermaine Heredia, Wayne Wilcox, Daniel London, Bianca Sams, Heather Barberie and Liisa Cohen | 2:46 |
| 12. | "Santa Fe" | Adam Pascal, Anthony Rapp, Jesse L. Martin and Wilson Jermaine Heredia | 3:27 |
| 13. | "I'll Cover You" | Jesse L. Martin and Wilson Jermaine Heredia | 2:30 |
| 14. | "Over The Moon" | Idina Menzel | 6:23 |
| Total length: | | | 47:33 |

Disc 2
| No. | Title | Artist(s) | Length |
|---|---|---|---|
| 1. | "La Vie Bohème A" | Cast of Rent | 6:59 |
| 2. | "I Should Tell You" | Adam Pascal, Rosario Dawson | 2:52 |
| 3. | "La Vie Bohème B" | Adam Pascal, Anthony Rapp, Idina Menzel, Jesse L. Martin, Rosario Dawson, Tracie Thoms and Wilson Jermaine Heredia | 1:36 |
| 4. | "Seasons Of Love" (reprise) | Cast of Rent | 1:09 |
| 5. | "Take Me or Leave Me" | Idina Menzel and Tracie Thoms | 3:51 |
| 6. | "Without You" | Adam Pascal and Rosario Dawson | 4:16 |
| 7. | "I'll Cover You" (reprise) | Anthony Rapp, Adam Pascal, Rosario Dawson, Jesse L. Martin, Wilson Jermaine Heredia, Idina Menzel and Tracie Thoms | 3:40 |
| 8. | "Halloween" | Anthony Rapp | 1:31 |
| 9. | "Goodbye Love" | Adam Pascal, Anthony Rapp, Idina Menzel, Jesse L. Martin, Rosario Dawson, Taye Diggs and Tracie Thoms | 6:25 |
| 10. | "What You Own" | Adam Pascal and Anthony Rapp | 3:59 |
| 11. | "Finale A" | Adam Pascal and Rosario Dawson | 1:21 |
| 12. | "Your Eyes" | Adam Pascal | 2:38 |
| 13. | "Finale B" | Cast of Rent | 2:34 |
| 14. | "Love Heals" (bonus track) | Cast of Rent | 4:36 |
| Total length: | | | 47:27 |

== Chart performance ==
=== Weekly charts ===
Weekly chart performance for Rent (Original Motion Picture Soundtrack)
| Chart (2005) | Peak position |
|---|---|
| US Billboard 200 | 40 |
| US Current Album Sales (Billboard) | 40 |
| US Soundtrack Albums (Billboard) | 3 |

=== Year-end charts ===
Year-end chart performance for Rent (Original Motion Picture Soundtrack)
| Chart (2006) | Position |
|---|---|
| US Soundtrack Albums (Billboard) | 11 |

== Rent (Selections from the Motion Picture Soundtrack) ==
Rent (Selections from the Original Motion Picture Soundtrack)

Soundtrack album by cast of Rent
- Released: October 21, 2005
- Recorded: 2004–2005
- Genres: Musical, soundtrack
- Length: 64:38
- Label: Warner Bros.
- Producer: Rob Cavallo

Rent (Selections from the Motion Picture Soundtrack) is the second album featuring selections of the original tracks used in the film. It was released on October 21, 2005 by Warner Bros. Records.

=== Track listing ===
| No. | Title | Artist(s) | Length |
|---|---|---|---|
| 1. | "Seasons Of Love" | Jesse L. Martin, Tracie Thoms, Rosario Dawson, Adam Pascal, Wilson Jermaine Heredia and Anthony Rapp | 3:02 |
| 2. | "Rent" | Anthony Rapp, Adam Pascal, Jesse L. Martin and Taye Diggs | 3:58 |
| 3. | "One Song Glory" | Adam Pascal | 2:46 |
| 4. | "Light My Candle" | Adam Pascal and Rosario Dawson | 4:09 |
| 5. | "Today 4 U" | Anthony Rapp, Jesse L. Martin and Wilson Jermaine Heredia | 2:45 |
| 6. | "Tango: Maureen" | Anthony Rapp, Tracie Thoms | 3:55 |
| 7. | "Out Tonight" | Rosario Dawson | 3:55 |
| 8. | "Santa Fe" | Adam Pascal, Anthony Rapp, Jesse L. Martin and Wilson Jermaine Heredia | 3:27 |
| 9. | "I'll Cover You" | Jesse L. Martin and Wilson Jermaine Heredia | 2:30 |
| 10. | "La Vie Bohème (A and B)" | Cast of Rent | 8:28 |
| 11. | "I Should Tell You" | Adam Pascal, Rosario Dawson | 2:52 |
| 12. | "Take Me or Leave Me" | Idina Menzel and Tracie Thoms | 3:51 |
| 13. | "Without You" | Adam Pascal and Rosario Dawson | 4:16 |
| 14. | "I'll Cover You" (reprise) | Anthony Rapp, Adam Pascal, Rosario Dawson, Jesse L. Martin, Wilson Jermaine Heredia, Idina Menzel and Tracie Thoms | 3:40 |
| 15. | "What You Own" | Adam Pascal and Anthony Rapp | 3:59 |
| 16. | "Finale B" | Cast of Rent | 2:34 |
| 17. | "Love Heals" (bonus track) | Cast of Rent | 4:36 |
| 18. | "Seasons of Love" (Gomi's Lair Radio Edit) | Jesse L. Martin, Tracie Thoms, Rosario Dawson, Adam Pascal, Wilson Jermaine Heredia and Anthony Rapp | 3:44 |
| Total length: | | | 47:27 |

=== Charts ===
==== Weekly charts ====
Weekly chart performance for Rent (Selections from the Original Motion Picture Soundtrack)
| Chart (2005) | Peak position |
|---|---|
| US Billboard 200 | 43 |
| US Current Album Sales (Billboard) | 43 |
| US Soundtrack Albums (Billboard) | 4 |

==== Year-end charts ====
Year-end chart performance for Rent (Selections from the Original Motion Picture Soundtrack)
| Chart (2006) | Position |
|---|---|
| US Soundtrack Albums (Billboard) | 10 |

== Extended plays ==
To promote the film, Warner Bros. Records had dance remixes of several of the songs commissioned. Two extended plays of the remix albums were sent to clubs and also made available for purchase on digital download.

Seasons of Love: The Remixes
| No. | Title | Length |
|---|---|---|
| 1. | "Seasons of Love" (Gomi's Lair Club Mix) | 8:22 |
| 2. | "Seasons of Love" (Monkey Bars Club Mix) | 7:20 |
| 3. | "Seasons of Love" (L.E.X. Theatrical Club Mix) | 8:11 |
| 4. | "Seasons of Love" (Eddie Baez's "Payin' The Rent" Club Mix) | 10:13 |
| 5. | "Seasons of Love" (Gomi's Lair Radio Edit) | 3:44 |
| 6. | "Seasons of Love" (Monkey Bars Remix Edit) | 4:48 |
| 7. | "Seasons of Love" (L.E.X. Theatrical Club Mix Edit) | 4:57 |
| 8. | "Seasons of Love" (Eddie Baez's "Payin' The Rent" Club Mix Edit) | 4:59 |
| Total length: | | 52:34 |

Take Me or Leave Me: The Remixes
| No. | Title | Length |
|---|---|---|
| 1. | "Take Me or Leave Me" (Tracy Young Radio) | 3:35 |
| 2. | "Take Me or Leave Me" (Tracy Young Remix) | 8:35 |
| 3. | "Take Me or Leave Me" (Gabriel D Vine's Big Band Disco Remix) | 6:16 |
| 4. | "Take Me or Leave Me" (Jackie and Jorio Club Mix) | 7:09 |
| 5. | "Take Me or Leave Me" (Tracy Young Dub) | 10:09 |
| 6. | "Out Tonight" (Mark!'s Redux Club Remix) | 8:32 |
| 7. | "Light My Candle" (Monkey Bars Remix) | 6:27 |
| Total length: | | 50:43 |

== Personnel ==
Credits adapted from AllMusic.

=== Album credits ===
- Music, lyrics and concept – Jonathan Larson
- Producer – Rob Cavallo
- Arrangement – Rob Cavallo, Tim Weil, David Campbell
- Engineer – Brian Cometa, Dann Thompson, Elan Trujillo
- Programmed by – Dorian Crozier
- Recorded by – Doug McKean
- Mixed by – Andrew Scheps, Doug McKean
- Mastered by – Ted Jensen
- Supervised by – Matt Sullivan
- Conductor – Tim Weil
- Coordinator – Cheryl Jenets
- Design – Orabor
- Legal affairs (Columbia Pictures) – Larry Kohorn, Shelly Bunge
- Legal affairs (Warner Bros. Records Inc.) – Ray Gonzalez, Susan Genco
- Management – Denise Luiso
- Product manager – Justin "Bumper" Reeve
- Executive producer – Chris Columbus

=== Musician credits ===
- Acoustic and electric guitar – Greg Suran, Tim Pierce
- Bass – Paul Bushnell
- Computer – Dan Chase, Matt Beckley
- Drums – Dorian Crozier
- Keyboards, organ and piano – Jamie Muhoberac
- Percussion – Dorian Crozier
