= Rent: Live =

American television special

- Based on: Rent by Jonathan Larson
- Written by: Kristoffer Diaz
- Directed by: Michael Greif; Alex Rudzinski
- Starring: Vanessa Hudgens; Jordan Fisher; Tinashe; Kiersey Clemons; Brennin Hunt; Mario; Valentina; Brandon Victor Dixon
- Composer: Jonathan Larson
- Country of origin: United States
- Original language: English

Production
- Executive producers: Marc Platt; Adam Siegel; Julie Larson; Al Larson; Vince Totino; Scott Hemming; Marla Levine; Alex Rudzinski
- Producers: Greg Sills; Kenneth Ferrone
- Production location: 20th Century Fox Studios
- Production companies: Marc Platt Productions; Revolution Studios; Sony Pictures Television; 20th Century Fox Television

Original release
- Network: Fox
- Release: January 27, 2019

Rent: Live is an American television special that was broadcast by Fox on January 27, 2019. It is a partially live (Note: Much of the program consisted of footage from a prerecorded dress rehearsal, as actor Brennin Hunt was injured on January 26, 2019, and was unable to perform the show's choreography.) production of the 1996 Tony Award-winning musical Rent, which tells the story of a group of impoverished young artists struggling to survive and create a life in Lower Manhattan's East Village in the thriving days of Bohemian Alphabet City, under the shadow of HIV/AIDS. The special was produced by Marc Platt Productions, Revolution Studios, Sony Pictures Television and 20th Century Fox Television.

== Cast and characters ==
- Jordan Fisher as Mark Cohen
- Brennin Hunt as Roger Davis
- Tinashe as Mimi Marquez
- Brandon Victor Dixon as Tom Collins
- Valentina as Angel Dumott Schunard
- Vanessa Hudgens as Maureen Johnson
- Kiersey Clemons as Joanne Jefferson
- Mario as Benjamin "Benny" Coffin III

=== Soloists ===
- Keala Settle as Cy (a gender-flipped version of Paul from the original, also combined with soloist 1), Homeless Person, Vendor, Roger's Mother
- Jennifer Leigh Warren as Homeless Woman with Bags, Mrs. Jefferson, Sue, Vendor, Police Officer, Mrs. Cohen
- Debra Cardona as Homeless Woman 2, Ali, Vendor, Police Officer, Cook, Angel's Mom, Mimi's Mother
- Matt Saldivar as Mr. Grey, Salvation Army Santa, Gordon, Drunk Santa 1, Vendor, Security Guard
- Alton Fitzgerald White as Police Officer, Mr. Jefferson, Support Group Member 2, Homeless Man, Vendor, Cook, Drag Queen, The Pastor
- J. Elaine Marcos as Police Officer, Pam, Vendor, Homeless Woman 1, Coat Vendor, Server, Alexi Darling, Angel's Sister, Halloween Costume
- Bryce Ryness as The Man, Police Officer, Cook Owner, Support Group Member 16
- Emerson Collins as Police Officer, Steve, Drunk Santa 2, Junkie, Host, Halloween Costume
- Fredric Odgaard
- Benjamin Douglas Rivera
- Darius Crenshaw

=== Ensemble ===
- Robert Roldan
- Morgan Marcell
- Khori Petinaud
- Mia DeWeese
- Fred Odgaard
- Tilly Evans-Krueger

=== Dancers ===
- Hannahlei Cabanilla
- Sasha Dominique Mallory
- Ty Wells
- Jessica Lee Keller
- Lenin Fernandez Jr.
- Nick Lanzisera
- Benjamin Douglas Rivera

The original Broadway cast, including Daphne Rubin-Vega, Anthony Rapp, Fredi Walker, Adam Pascal, Jesse L. Martin, Taye Diggs, Wilson Jermaine Heredia, Idina Menzel, and Gilles Chiasson made cameos in the special.

== Musical numbers ==
=== Act 1 ===
- "Tune Up #1" – Mark, Roger
- "Voice Mail #1" – Mark's Mom
- "Tune Up #2" – Mark, Roger, Collins, Benny
- "Rent" – Mark, Roger, Joanne, Benny, Collins, Ensemble
- "You Okay, Honey?" – Angel, Collins, Homeless Man
- "Tune Up #3" – Mark
- "One Song Glory" – Roger
- "Light My Candle" – Roger, Mimi
- "Today 4 U" – Angel, Collins, Mark, Roger
- "You'll See" – Benny, Mark, Roger, Collins, Angel
- "Voice Mail #2" – Joanne's Mom, Joanne's Dad
- "Tango: Maureen" – Mark, Joanne
- "Life Support" – Cy, Gordon, Steve, Ali, Pam, Sue, Angel, Collins, Mark
- "Out Tonight" – Mimi
- "Another Day" – Roger, Mimi, Ensemble
- "Will I?" – Company
- "On the Street" – Homeless Man, Carolers, Homeless Woman, Cops, Mark, Collins, Angel
- "Santa Fe" – Collins, Angel, Mark
- "I'll Cover You" – Collins, Angel
- "We're Okay" – Joanne
- "Christmas Bells" – Company
- "Over the Moon" – Maureen
- "La Vie Bohème" – Company
- "I Should Tell You" – Mimi, Roger
- "La Vie Bohème B" – Company

=== Act 2 ===
- "Seasons of Love" – Company
- "Happy New Year" – Mark, Roger, Maureen, Mimi, Joanne
- "Voice Mail #3" – Mark's Mom, Alexi Darling
- "Happy New Year B" – Mark, Roger, Maureen, Mimi, Joanne, Benny, The Man
- "Take Me or Leave Me" – Maureen, Joanne
- "Without You" – Mimi, Roger
- "Voice Mail #4" – Alexa Darling
- "Contact" – Company
- "I'll Cover You [Reprise]" – Collins, Cy, Mark, Ensemble
- "Halloween" – Mark
- "Goodbye Love" – Mark, Roger, Mimi, Joanne, Maureen, Benny, Collins
- "What You Own" – Mark, Roger
- "Voice Mail #5" – Parents
- "Finale" – Homeless People, Mark, Roger, Collins, Maureen, Joanne, Mimi
- "Your Eyes" – Roger
- "Finale B" – Company
- "Seasons of Love (Finale C)" – Company, Original Broadway Cast of Rent

Several of the songs, notably the various "Voice Mails," "Christmas Bells" and "Finale A", were shortened to fit the run time. "Seasons of Love B" was cut entirely.

== Production and broadcast ==
Marc Platt, Adam Siegel, Julie and Al Larson (Jonathan's sister and father, respectively), Vince Totino, Scott Hemming, and Marla Levine are credited as executive producers.

On January 26, 2019, during the Saturday dress rehearsal, Brennin Hunt, who plays Roger, broke his foot. Fox announced in an official statement that despite his injury, the show would air as planned using both pre-recorded footage from a previous dress rehearsal and live footage. On January 27, the show was performed in its entirety with limited physical activity before a studio audience as scheduled, with Hunt performing in a wheelchair.

The simultaneous telecast consisted almost entirely of the prerecorded dress rehearsal from the prior night; only the final 15 minutes of the program, which consisted of the songs "Finale", "Your Eyes", and "Finale B", as well as an encore performance of "Seasons of Love" featuring the original 1996 Broadway cast, was broadcast live. The choreography of the final act was modified to accommodate Hunt being in a wheelchair.

=== WNYW technical issues ===
A technical fault at the start of the show occurred with New York City's Fox flagship station WNYW and its direct fiber connection to cable providers Optimum and Spectrum, resulting in those viewers missing the first five minutes of the special, including all or part of the musical numbers "Tune Up #1," "Voice Mail #1," "Tune Up #2" and "Rent".

== Reception ==
=== Critical reception ===
The special received mixed to negative reviews from critics. On Rotten Tomatoes, it holds a 27% approval rating from 22 reviews, with an average score of 5.8/10. The critical consensus reads, "Despite the show's earnest intentions, Rent Live's clumsy production and pre-recorded broadcast render it an underwhelming 'live' musical event." On Metacritic, which calculates a weighted average of review scores, the special holds a score of 49 out of 100 based on 12 reviews, indicating a "mixed or average" reception.

Much of the criticism focused on the production's failure to hire understudies for the main cast in reference to Hunt's injury, as well as the decision to broadcast a prerecorded performance for a program marketed as live television. Daniel Fienberg, writing for The Hollywood Reporter, wrote that the network "could have quickly strategized a live concert setting with a limited staging around Hunt and then aired the dress rehearsal at some point during the week." Aisha Harris, reviewing for The New York Times, echoed these sentiments, writing "How do you measure three hours of chaotic visuals and middling audio most of us were never meant to see and hear?", and calling the camerawork "overwrought."

Extensive edits to profanity and sexual references in the musical's lyrical content, made in order to meet network broadcasting standards, was also the subject of criticism, with Variety critic Caroline Framke questioning if a broadcast network was an appropriate outlet for a production of the show in the first place.

However, the cast's performances (particularly Fisher, Dixon, Tinashe and Hudgens) were generally praised, and the production design of the program was also well received. In a mostly positive review for The A.V. Club, Caroline Siede wrote that the special "did what these live musicals are supposed to do—reimagine a beloved musical with a new aesthetic, new performers, and new staging choices," and praised the show's finale featuring the 1996 Broadway cast.

=== Ratings ===
The telecast received a 1.4 rating among adults 18 to 49 and 3.42 million total viewers, making it the lowest-rated live musical broadcast as of its airdate. In markets where ratings were available segment-by-segment, viewership fell dramatically after the opening segment.

== Awards ==
Award	Category	Nominee(s)	Result	Ref.
Art Directors Guild Awards	Variety, Reality or Competition Series	Jason Sherwood	Nominated	
Casting Society of America	Live Television Performance – Variety or Sketch Comedy	Bernie Telsey, Tiffany Little Canfield and Ryan Bernard Tymensky	Nominated	
GLAAD Media Awards	Outstanding TV Movie	Rent: Live	Nominated	
Primetime Emmy Awards	Outstanding Variety Special (Live)	Marc Platt, Adam Siegel, Julie Larson, Allan Larson, Vince Totino, Scott Hemming, Alex Rudzinski, Kenneth Ferrone and Gregory Sills	Nominated	
Primetime Emmy Awards	Outstanding Lighting Design / Lighting Direction for a Variety Special	Patrick Brazil, Ben Green, Al Gurdon, Madigan Stehly and Ryan Tanker	Won	
Primetime Emmy Awards	Outstanding Make-up for a Multi-Camera Series or Special (Non-Prosthetic)	Zena Shteysel, Angela Moos, Donna Bard, Rocky Faulkner, Bruce Grayson and Julie Socash	Nominated	
Primetime Emmy Awards	Outstanding Production Design for a Variety Special	Jason Sherwood, Adam Rowe and John Sparano	Won	
Primetime Emmy Awards	Outstanding Technical Direction, Camerawork, Video Control for a Special	Eric Becker, Charles Ciup, Chris Hill, Emilie Scaminaci, Bert Atkinson, Nat Havholm, Ron Lehman, David Levisohn, Tore Livia, Adam Morgolis, Rob Palmer, Brian Reason, Dylan Sanford, Damien Turrerau and Andrew Waruszewski	Nominated	

== See also ==
- 2019 in American television
- LGBTQ culture in New York City
