= Rent (albums) =

Featuring music from the musical Rent

Soundtrack album by Various artists
- Released: August 27, 1996
- Recorded: Early 1996 (Sorcerer Sound)
- Length: 126 minutes
- Label: DreamWorks
- Producers: Arif Mardin, Steve Skinner

The Best of Rent

Cast recording
- Released: September 7, 1999
- Genre: Show tunes
- Label: DreamWorks

Rent (Original Broadway Cast Recording) is an album of music from the Tony- and Pulitzer-winning 1996 musical Rent, with music and lyrics by Jonathan Larson. Produced by DreamWorks, the double-album collects every song from the musical, along with brief segments of narration and spoken dialogue. The collection ends with a studio-recorded rearrangement of the song "Seasons of Love" featuring Stevie Wonder. The double-album was released on August 27, 1996. The one-disc Best of Rent highlights album was released in 1999.

== Track listing ==
=== Original Broadway Cast Recording ===
All tracks are written by Jonathan Larson.

Disc One
No.	Title	Performer(s)	Length
1.	"Tune Up #1"	Anthony Rapp, Adam Pascal	0:51
2.	"Voice Mail #1"	Kristen Lee Kelly	0:36
3.	"Tune Up #2"	Anthony Rapp, Adam Pascal	1:32
4.	"Rent"	Anthony Rapp, Adam Pascal, Jesse L. Martin, Fredi Walker, Taye Diggs	4:25
5.	"You Okay Honey?"	Jesse L. Martin, Wilson Jermaine Heredia	1:42
6.	"Tune Up #3"	Anthony Rapp, Adam Pascal	0:25
7.	"One Song Glory"	Adam Pascal	2:44
8.	"Light My Candle"	Adam Pascal, Daphne Rubin-Vega	4:05
9.	"Voice Mail #2"	Byron Utley, Gwen Stewart, Idina Menzel	0:46
10.	"Today 4 U"	Wilson Jermaine Heredia, Jesse L. Martin, Anthony Rapp, Adam Pascal	3:30
11.	"You'll See"	Taye Diggs, Adam Pascal, Anthony Rapp, Wilson Jermaine Heredia, Jesse L. Martin	2:57
12.	"Tango: Maureen"	Anthony Rapp, Fredi Walker	3:28
13.	"Life Support"	Wilson Jermaine Heredia, Jesse L. Martin, Anthony Rapp, Adam Pascal, Gilles Chiasson, Timothy Britten Parker, Rodney Hicks	1:59
14.	"Out Tonight"	Daphne Rubin-Vega	3:49
15.	"Another Day"	Adam Pascal, Daphne Rubin-Vega	4:44
16.	"Will I?"	Gilles Chiasson, Wilson Jermaine Heredia, Jesse L. Martin, Anthony Rapp, Adam Pascal	2:30
17.	"On The Street"	Anthony Rapp, Wilson Jermaine Heredia	1:33
18.	"Santa Fe"	Wilson Jermaine Heredia, Jesse L. Martin, Anthony Rapp	3:13
19.	"I'll Cover You"	Wilson Jermaine Heredia, Jesse L. Martin	2:29
20.	"We're Okay"	Fredi Walker	1:23
21.	"Christmas Bells"	Jesse L. Martin, Wilson Jermaine Heredia, Anthony Rapp, Adam Pascal, Daphne Rubin-Vega, Taye Diggs, Idina Menzel	6:05
22.	"Over The Moon"	Idina Menzel	5:16
23.	"La Vie Bohème"	Anthony Rapp, Adam Pascal, Daphne Rubin-Vega, Jesse L. Martin, Wilson Jermaine Heredia, Idina Menzel, Fredi Walker, Taye Diggs	8:00
24.	"I Should Tell You"	Adam Pascal, Daphne Rubin-Vega	3:01
25.	"La Vie Bohème B"	Anthony Rapp, Adam Pascal, Daphne Rubin-Vega, Jesse L. Martin, Wilson Jermaine Heredia, Idina Menzel, Fredi Walker	1:53
Total length:			1:12:55

Disc Two
No.	Title	Performer(s)	Length
1.	"Seasons of Love"	Anthony Rapp, Adam Pascal, Daphne Rubin-Vega, Jesse L. Martin, Wilson Jermaine Heredia, Idina Menzel, Fredi Walker, Taye Diggs, Gwen Stewart, Byron Utley	2:52
2.	"Happy New Year"	Daphne Rubin-Vega, Adam Pascal, Anthony Rapp, Idina Menzel, Fredi Walker, Jesse L. Martin, Wilson Jermaine Heredia	3:24
3.	"Voice Mail #3"	Kristen Lee Kelly, Aiko Nakasone	0:51
4.	"Happy New Year B"	Idina Menzel, Fredi Walker, Anthony Rapp, Taye Diggs, Adam Pascal, Daphne Rubin-Vega, Wilson Jermaine Heredia, Jesse L. Martin	3:57
5.	"Take Me or Leave Me"	Idina Menzel, Fredi Walker	3:43
6.	"Seasons of Love B"	Anthony Rapp, Adam Pascal, Daphne Rubin-Vega, Jesse L. Martin, Wilson Jermaine Heredia, Idina Menzel, Fredi Walker, Taye Diggs	1:05
7.	"Without You"	Daphne Rubin-Vega, Adam Pascal	4:21
8.	"Voice Mail #4"	Aiko Nakasone	0:32
9.	"Contact"	Anthony Rapp, Adam Pascal, Daphne Rubin-Vega, Jesse L. Martin, Wilson Jermaine Heredia, Idina Menzel, Fredi Walker	2:08
10.	"I'll Cover You (Reprise)"	Jesse L. Martin, Fredi Walker, Anthony Rapp, Adam Pascal, Idina Menzel, Daphne Rubin-Vega, Taye Diggs	2:51
11.	"Halloween"	Anthony Rapp	1:49
12.	"Goodbye Love"	Daphne Rubin-Vega, Adam Pascal, Taye Diggs, Idina Menzel, Fredi Walker, Anthony Rapp, Jesse L. Martin	5:58
13.	"What You Own"	Anthony Rapp, Adam Pascal	3:56
14.	"Voice Mail #5"	Aiko Nakasone, Byron Utley, Kristen Lee Kelly	0:56
15.	"Finale"	Anthony Rapp, Adam Pascal, Jesse L. Martin, Idina Menzel, Daphne Rubin-Vega, Fredi Walker	5:30
16.	"Your Eyes"	Adam Pascal	2:21
17.	"Finale B"	Daphne Rubin-Vega, Adam Pascal, Fredi Walker, Idina Menzel, Jesse L. Martin, Anthony Rapp	2:53
18.	"Seasons of Love" (featuring Stevie Wonder)	Stevie Wonder, Anthony Rapp, Adam Pascal, Daphne Rubin-Vega, Jesse L. Martin, Wilson Jermaine Heredia, Idina Menzel, Fredi Walker, Taye Diggs	4:26
Total length:			53:32

=== The Best of Rent: Highlights From The Original Cast Album ===
1. "Rent" - Anthony Rapp, Adam Pascal, Daphne Rubin-Vega, Jesse L. Martin, Idina Menzel, Fredi Walker, Taye Diggs
2. "One Song Glory" - Adam Pascal
3. "Light My Candle" - Adam Pascal, Daphne Rubin-Vega
4. "Today 4 U" - Wilson Jermaine Heredia, Jesse L. Martin, Anthony Rapp, Adam Pascal
5. "Tango: Maureen" - Anthony Rapp, Fredi Walker
6. "Life Support" - Wilson Jermaine Heredia, Jesse L. Martin, Anthony Rapp, Adam Pascal, Gilles Chiasson, Timothy Britten Parker, Rodney Hicks
7. "Out Tonight" - Daphne Rubin-Vega
8. "Another Day" - Adam Pascal, Daphne Rubin-Vega
9. "Will I?" - Gilles Chiasson, Wilson Jermaine Heredia, Jesse L. Martin, Anthony Rapp, Adam Pascal
10. "Santa Fe" - Wilson Jermaine Heredia, Jesse L. Martin, Anthony Rapp, Adam Pascal
11. "I'll Cover You" - Wilson Jermaine Heredia, Jesse L. Martin
12. "La Vie Bohème" - Anthony Rapp, Adam Pascal, Daphne Rubin-Vega, Jesse L. Martin, Wilson Jermaine Heredia, Idina Menzel, Fredi Walker, Taye Diggs
13. "I Should Tell You" - Adam Pascal, Daphne Rubin-Vega
14. "La Vie Bohème B" - Anthony Rapp, Adam Pascal, Daphne Rubin-Vega, Jesse L. Martin, Wilson Jermaine Heredia, Idina Menzel, Fredi Walker
15. "Seasons of Love" - Anthony Rapp, Adam Pascal, Daphne Rubin-Vega, Jesse L. Martin, Wilson Jermaine Heredia, Idina Menzel, Fredi Walker, Taye Diggs, Gwen Stewart, Byron Utley
16. "Take Me or Leave Me" - Idina Menzel, Fredi Walker
17. "Without You" - Daphne Rubin-Vega, Adam Pascal
18. "I'll Cover You (Reprise)" - Jesse L. Martin, Fredi Walker, Anthony Rapp, Adam Pascal, Idina Menzel, Daphne Rubin-Vega, Taye Diggs
19. "What You Own" - Anthony Rapp, Adam Pascal
20. "Finale B" - Daphne Rubin-Vega, Adam Pascal, Fredi Walker, Idina Menzel, Jesse L. Martin, Anthony Rapp
21. "Seasons of Love (Arif Mardin's Remix)" - Anthony Rapp, Adam Pascal, Daphne Rubin-Vega, Jesse L. Martin, Wilson Jermaine Heredia, Idina Menzel, Fredi Walker, Taye Diggs, Gwen Stewart, Byron Utley

== See also ==
- Rent: Original Motion Picture Soundtrack
