= Eric Chivian =

American medical academic

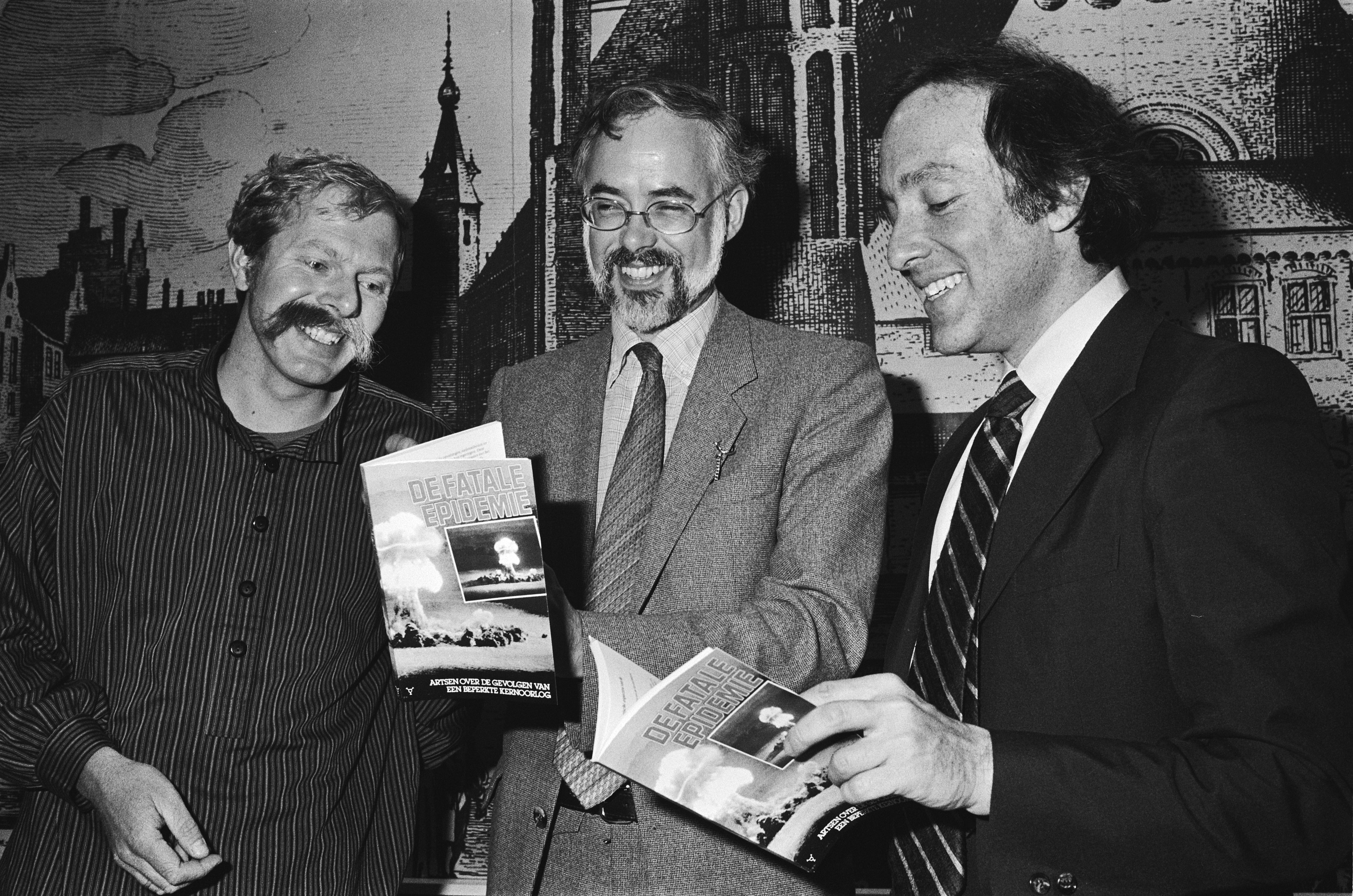
Chivian (right) during a book presentation in the Netherlands (1982)

Eric S. Chivian is the founder and director of the Center for Health and the Global Environment (CHGE) at Harvard Medical School, where he is also an assistant clinical professor of psychiatry.

== Life and career ==
A 1964 graduate of Harvard University (AB, biochemistry), he went on to graduate from Harvard Medical School in 1968.

Between 1980 and 2000, Chivian was a staff psychiatrist in the MIT Medical Department. Chivian was the co-founder (with professors Bernard Lown, Herbert L. Abrams, and James E. Muller), treasurer, and member of the board of directors of the organization International Physicians for the Prevention of Nuclear War, which won the Nobel Peace Prize in 1985 for its efforts to highlight the implications of nuclear conflict for global health. In the mid-1980s, he directed the first scientific survey (under the auspices of the American Academy of Arts and Sciences and the MIT Center for International Studies) of American and Soviet teenagers' attitudes about the prospect of nuclear war and their concerns for the future. He was the lead author of a seminal paper on this study in The New England Journal of Medicine He was the senior editor and author for the book Last Aid: The Medical Dimensions of Nuclear War, published by W.H. Freeman and Company in 1983.

In the early 1990s, Chivian became involved in efforts to create a greater awareness of the impacts which environmental degradation has on human health and well-being. His second book (as senior editor and lead author) was Critical Condition: Human Health and the Environment. The book, published by MIT Press in 1993, was one of the first books on this topic for a general audience (later editions were published in German, Spanish, Japanese, Chinese and Persian).

Chivian founded the Center for Health and the Global Environment at Harvard Medical School in 1996, with the mission "to help people understand that our health, and that of our children, depends on the health of the environment and that we must do everything we can to protect it." The center is designated an official "Collaborating Center" of the United Nations Environment Programme. Chivian developed and directed the Harvard Medical School course "Human Health and Global Environmental Change", which he taught for a decade and which has been disseminated to 65 other medical schools, colleges, and universities in the U.S. and abroad; he also designed an intensive annual course on the environment and health for the U.S. Congress and led and participated in numerous congressional briefings.

Chivian is recognized as a leading proponent of efforts to create a greater awareness amongst policy makers and the public of the importance of biodiversity to human health, an issue on which he has contributed several book chapters, and published many scientific papers, literature reviews, and editorials. Chivian is the senior editor and author, with CHGE associate Aaron Bernstein, of Sustaining Life: How Human Health Depends on Biodiversity, published in June 2008 by Oxford University Press and co-sponsored by the United Nations Development Programme, the United Nations Environment Programme, the United Nations Secretariat's Convention on Biological Diversity, and the World Conservation Union (IUCN). The book was launched at UN Headquarters, the Smithsonian Institution, and at the UN Convention on Biological Diversity Conference of the Parties meeting in Bonn, Germany in 2008. The book includes contributions from over 100 leading biodiversity and health scientists, and has been widely praised for its detailed coverage of a broad range of issues in a manner accessible to the general public. Sustaining Life was named best biology book for 2008 by the Library Journal along with E. O. Wilson's and Bert Hölldobler's Superorganism.

Chivian was also involved in setting up the First International Conference on Health and Biodiversity (COHAB 2005) which he opened in Galway, Ireland in 2005. This was the first global meeting of its kind to bring UN agencies, scientists, NGOs, policy makers, economists, indigenous and local community representatives and the private sector together to explore the wide-ranging implications of biodiversity loss for human health and well-being. The conference, and the global programme for Co-operation on Health and Biodiversity which was established as a result, were largely based on Chivian's work and the concepts behind the Sustaining Life project.

In recent years, Chivian has worked to explore common ground between scientific and religious perspectives on environmental issues. Together with the Rev. Richard Cizik, then Vice President for Governmental Affairs of the National Association of Evangelicals, Chivian was named by Time magazine in 2008 as one of the 100 most influential people in the world, for their work in organizing scientists and evangelicals to join together in efforts to protect the global environment.

Chivian runs Pairidaeza Farm, an almost fully organic orchard in central Massachusetts growing heirloom apples, peaches, pears, Asian pears, apricots, plums, cherries and grapes.

Chivian's father-in-law was writer Joseph Jay Deiss, and his son-in-law is actor Adam Pascal. Chivian is thanked in the closing credits of BAFTA-winning nuclear war docu-drama Threads, produced in 1984.
