= Take Me or Leave Me =

Song from the musical Rent

Song by Idina Menzel and Fredi Walker

from the album Rent (Original Broadway Cast Recording)
- Genre: Show tune; R&B
- Length: 3:43
- Songwriter: Jonathan Larson
- Producers: Arif Mardin; Steve Skinner

"Take Me or Leave Me" is a song from the musical Rent, written by American composer Jonathan Larson. In the original 1996 Broadway production, the song was performed by Idina Menzel as Maureen and Fredi Walker as Joanne.

Rent is inspired by the opera La Boheme, and the lyrics of the first verse of "Take Me or Leave Me" are based on that of the La Boheme aria "Quando m'en vo'".

== Film version ==
"Take Me or Leave Me"

Single by Idina Menzel and Tracie Thoms

from the album Rent (Original Motion Picture Soundtrack)
- Released: September 23, 2005
- Studio: El Dorado Studios; Skywalker Sound
- Genre: Show tune; R&B
- Length: 3:51
- Label: Warner Bros.
- Songwriter: Jonathan Larson
- Producer: Rob Cavallo

Rent soundtrack singles chronology
"Seasons of Love" (2005)	"Take Me or Leave Me" (2005)

Idina Menzel singles chronology
"Seasons of Love" (2005)	"Take Me or Leave Me" (2005)	"Defying Gravity" (2007)

In the 2005 film adaptation, "Take Me or Leave Me" is performed by Menzel, reprising her role as Maureen, and Tracie Thoms as Joanne, since Walker-Browne was considered too old for the role. Remixes of the song were released on April 11, 2006.

=== Track listings ===
Remixes digital EP
No.	Title	Length
1.	"Take Me or Leave Me" (Tracy Young Radio)	3:36
2.	"Take Me or Leave Me" (Tracy Young Mixshow)	6:44
3.	"Take Me or Leave Me" (Jackie and Jorio Club Mix)	7:17
4.	"Take Me or Leave Me" (Gabriel D. Vine's Big Band Disco Remix)	6:19
5.	"Out Tonight" (performed by Rosario Dawson) (Mark!'s Redux Club Remix Edit)	4:55
6.	"Light My Candle" (performed by Rosario Dawson) (Monkey Bars Remix)	6:29

Remixes CD maxi single
No.	Title	Length
1.	"Take Me or Leave Me" (Tracy Young Radio)	3:35
2.	"Take Me or Leave Me" (Tracy Young Remix)	8:35
3.	"Take Me or Leave Me" (Gabriel D. Vine's Big Band Disco Remix)	6:16
4.	"Take Me or Leave Me" (Jackie and Jorio Club Mix)	7:09
5.	"Take Me or Leave Me" (Tracy Young Dub)	9:55
6.	"Out Tonight" (performed by Rosario Dawson) (Mark!'s Redux Club Remix)	8:30
7.	"Light My Candle" (performed by Rosario Dawson) (Monkey Bars Remix)	6:27

Remixes 12"
No.	Title	Length
1.	"Take Me or Leave Me" (Tracy Young Remix)	8:35
2.	"Take Me or Leave Me" (Tracy Young Dub)	9:55
3.	"Take Me or Leave Me" (Gabriel D. Vine's Big Band Disco Remix)	6:16
4.	"Take Me or Leave Me" (Jackie and Jorio Club Mix)	7:09
5.	"Out Tonight" (performed by Rosario Dawson) (Mark!'s Redux Club Remix)	8:30

=== Charts ===
Chart (2005–06)	Peak position
US Bubbling Under Hot 100 (Billboard)	25
US Dance Club Songs (Billboard)	32
US Hot Dance Singles Sales (Billboard)	10

== Performances and covers ==
Menzel has performed the song on a few concerts and tours, including the Barefoot at the Symphony Tour, Idina Menzel: Live at Radio City, Idina Menzel: World Tour, as a duet with randomly-chosen audience members. She also performed the song at the end of a curtain call for If/Then in 2014.

The song has been covered numerous times, with The Atlantic calling it a "modern musical theatre staple". Darren Criss and Aaron Tveit covered the song on a Skype conversation to promote Elsie Fest. In 2016, Anika Larsen and Keala Settle performed the song for From Broadway with Love: A Benefit Concert for Orlando, in support of the victims of the Orlando nightclub shooting. It was covered on the TV series Glee, by the characters Rachel Berry (Lea Michele) and Mercedes Jones (Amber Riley) in the episode "Comeback". Kevin Fallon of The Atlantic praised the cover as the highlight of the episode.

=== Charts (Glee version) ===
Chart (2011)	Peak position
Canada Hot 100 (Billboard)	60
US Billboard Hot 100	51
