= La Vie Bohème =

Song from the 1996 musical Rent

Song by Anthony Rapp, Adam Pascal, Daphne Rubin-Vega, Jesse L. Martin, Wilson Jermaine Heredia, Idina Menzel, Fredi Walker, and Taye Diggs

from the album Rent (Original Broadway Cast Recording)
- Genre: Show tune; rock
- Length: 8:00 ("La Vie Bohème A"); 1:53 ("La Vie Bohème B")
- Label: DreamWorks
- Songwriter: Jonathan Larson
- Producers: Arif Mardin; Steve Skinner

"La Vie Bohème" (French for 'The Bohemian Life') is a song from the 1996 musical Rent. The song is a celebration of bohemianism, especially the type present in early 1990s Alphabet City, Manhattan, which begins with a mocking of the character Benny's statement that "Bohemia is dead". The song features the characters of Rent listing ideas, people, trends, and other symbols of bohemianism and shouting out what and who inspires them, such as jazz poet Langston Hughes and counterculture-era comedian Lenny Bruce.

The song is broken into two parts, labeled "A" and "B"; between the two halves of the song is an interlude ("I Should Tell You") featuring a romantic duet between the characters Roger and Mimi, during which they each learn that the other is HIV+ and tentatively decide to begin a relationship together. In the stage musical, the second part of the song opens with a brief dialogue between the characters Maureen and Joanne discussing a protest instigated by Maureen earlier in the play, before the cast continues the celebration of bohemianism. "La Vie Bohème" concludes the first act of the musical.
