= Temptation (2004 film) =

2004 film directed by Mark Tarlov

- Directed by: Mark Tarlov
- Written by: Sydney Forest; Jon Taylor
- Based on: Faust
- Produced by: Kerry Barden
- Starring: Adam Pascal; Alice Ripley; Zoe Saldaña
- Release date: September 27, 2004
- Country: United States
- Language: English

Temptation is a 2004 movie musical written by Sydney Forest and John Taylor and directed by Mark Tarlov. The film starred Adam Pascal, Alice Ripley, and Zoe Saldana. The film has not yet had a theatrical or video release.

== Synopsis ==
The story tells the tale of Faust, making a deal with the devil, in a rock musical form. There is little-spoken dialogue in the film as the majority of the show is sung. The story is Annie works in a nightclub to support her boyfriend Billy. To settle an old debt with the nightclub owner Pablo, Nicholi and his personal assistant Sabrina make a deal with Annie to make Billy a star, however Nicholi warns her if she utter "After all I've done for you" then Nicholi will claim a part of her soul. Annie is confident her love for Billy and agrees. However she does ultimately lose the deal and has to pay, and Nicholi takes her voice. Howie makes a deal with Nicholi to get back her voice, even if he has too lose his entire soul for her.

== Production ==
The show uses characteristics of operatic recitative, as it is only being sung in Rock form, and is similar to musicals such as Rent and Bare. The vocals were recorded live on the set during filming, much like in the independent musical film Open House, rather than the lip synching process done in most movie musicals. Its website was once active but now has been taken down and no longer active. The film was shot primarily shot with green screen backgrounds, and all of the songs were sung live on set long before the film version of Les Miserables. In 2017 producer Kerry Barden revealed the film has not yet had its release due to the fact they "felt the product was unfinished. We hope to release the film soon."

== Cast ==
- Adam Pascal as Nicholi
- Alice Ripley as Sabrina
- Zoe Saldana as Annie
- Anika Noni Rose as Fog
- Michael Cerveris as Pablo
- Orfeh as Yvonne
- Deven May as Matt
- Annie Golden as Nora
- Manley Pope as Billy
- David St. Louis as Bartender

== Release ==
The film was shown at the New York Musical Festival in 2004.
