= International Physicians for the Prevention of Nuclear War =

Anti–nuclear war organization

- The logo of the IPPNW, featuring a nuclear missile in place of the Rod of Asclepius
- Abbreviation: IPPNW
- Formation: 1980
- Type: Non-governmental organization
- Purpose: Anti-nuclear weapons movement, peace
- Headquarters: Boston, United States
- Region served: Worldwide
- Award: 1984 UNESCO Prize for Peace Education 1985 Nobel Peace Prize
- Website: www.ippnw.org

International Physicians for the Prevention of Nuclear War (IPPNW) is a non-partisan federation of national medical groups in 63 countries, representing doctors, medical students, other health workers, and concerned people who share the goal of creating a more peaceful and secure world free from the threat of nuclear annihilation. The organization's headquarters is in Malden, Massachusetts. IPPNW was awarded the Nobel Peace Prize in 1985.

IPPNW affiliates are national medical organizations with a common commitment to the abolition of nuclear weapons and the prevention of war. Affiliates range in size from a handful of dedicated physicians and medical students to tens of thousands of activists and their supporters. As independent organizations within a global federation, IPPNW affiliates engage in a wide variety of activities related to war, health, social justice, and environmentalism.

== Formation ==
In 1961, future IPPNW founder Dr. Bernard Lown formed prevenient sister organization, the US Physicians for Social Responsibility (PSR) at Harvard, concerned about the medical effects of nuclear weapons and war. PSR aided in pushing the Baby Tooth Survey study to convince the then President John F. Kennedy and congress to pass the 1963 Partial Nuclear Test Ban Treaty to end atmospheric tests.

In December 1980, following a 6 letter exchange and an April meeting in Moscow between Dr. Lown and Dr. Yevgeny Chazov of the USSR Cardiology Institute, they agreed to meet in Geneva along with Dr. Eric Chivian, James E. Muller, Herbert Abrams, Leonid Ilyin, and Mikhail Kuzin to form IPPNW. There, IPPNW vowed that its focus would be the prevention of nuclear war and to spread awareness of the medical effects and dangers of a nuclear war internationally, along with strengthening medical community ties between the Soviet Union and the US.

== Awards ==
=== UNESCO Prize for Peace Education ===
On 30 October 1984, IPPNW received the UNESCO Prize for Peace Education at the UNESCO Headquarters in Paris, France. They received this award for "hav[ing] mobilized the conscience of hundreds of thousands of people the world over in the cause of peace and against a thermonuclear holocaust.". This award was presented by Deputy Director-General Jean Knapp to the organization and Dr. Lown and Dr. Chazof both accepted the award on behalf of IPPNW.

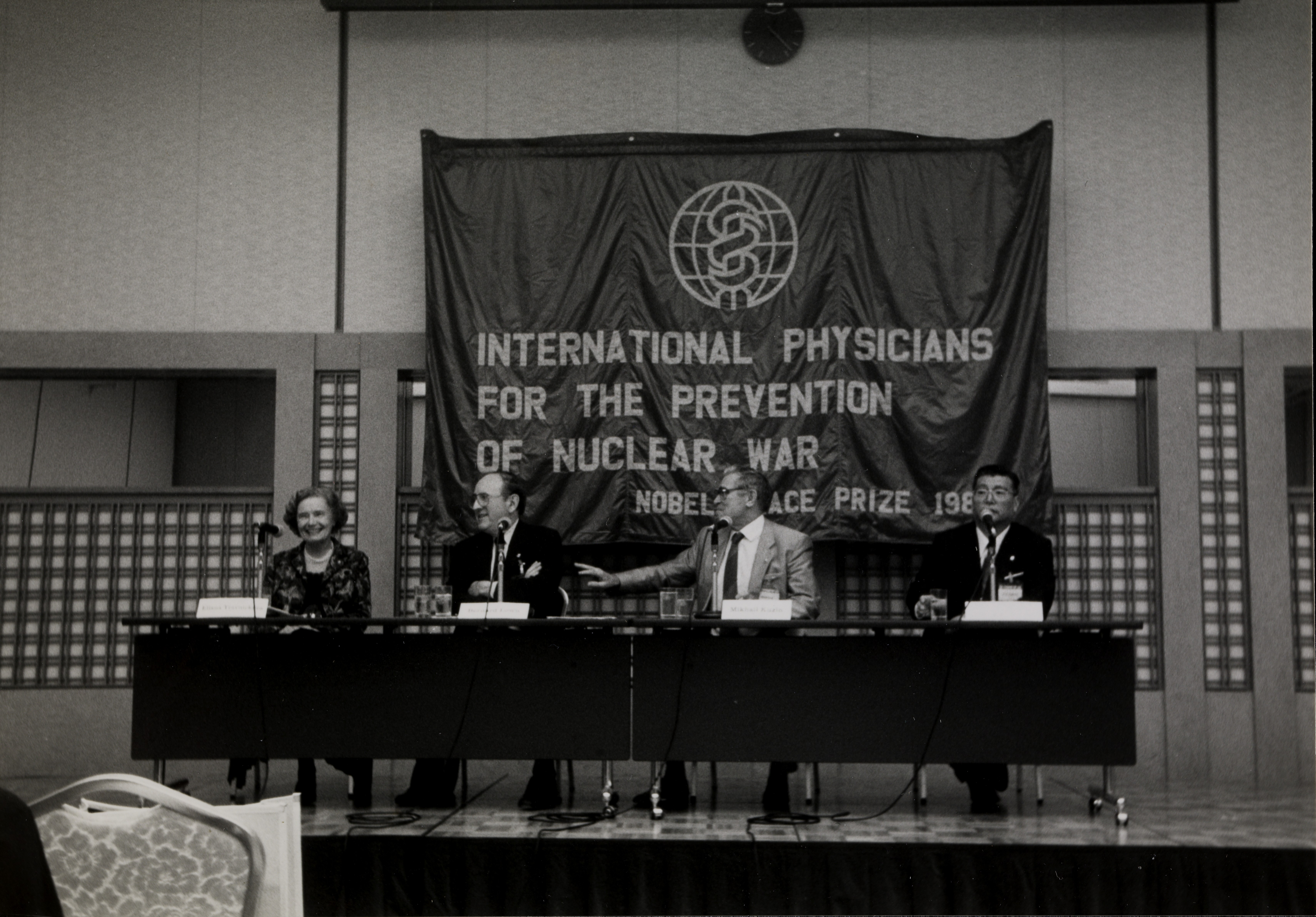
IPPNW Receiving the 1985 Nobel Peace Prize

=== Nobel Prize ===
On 10 December 1985, IPPNW was awarded the Nobel Peace Prize for "perform[ing] a considerable service to mankind by spreading authoritative information and by creating an awareness of the catastrophic consequences of atomic warfare." in Oslo, Norway. Dr. Lown and Dr. Chazof both spoke and accepted the reward on behalf of IPPNW and the award was shared with PSR.

IPPNW is one of the 8 Nobel Peace Prize winners for nuclear advocacy, a title it shares with its daughter organization, the International Campaign to Abolish Nuclear Weapons.

==== Controversy ====
During the Nobel Peace Prize award ceremony, 200 to 300 human rights advocates protested outside, citing co-recipient Dr. Yevgeny Chazof of partaking and being complicit with the 1972 political attacks against ex-Soviet physicist Dr. Andrei D. Sakharov, who himself won the 1975 Nobel Peace Prize On 12 November, Heiner Geisler of the Christian Democratic Union of Germany wrote a letter to the award committee denouncing Dr. Chazof and informing the committee of his actions. This had little effect on the delivery of the award as Committee Chairman Egil Aarvik declared in his speech, "This year’s prize is more concerned with the problem of disarmament, but is also at a deeper level concerned with human rights, perhaps even the most fundamental human right of them all, the right to live.".

== Organizational History ==
IPPNW was founded in 1980 by physicians from the United States and the Soviet Union who shared a common commitment to the prevention of nuclear war between their two countries. Citing a principle of the medical profession—that doctors have an obligation to prevent what they cannot treat—a global federation of physician experts came together to explain the medical and scientific facts about nuclear war to policy makers and to the public, and to advocate for the elimination of nuclear weapons from the world's arsenals.

Founding co-presidents Bernard Lown of the United States and Yevgeniy Chazov of the Soviet Union were joined by other early IPPNW leaders including James E. Muller, Ioan Moraru of Romania, Eric Chivian and Herb Abrams of the US and Mikhail Kuzin and Leonid Ilyin of the Soviet Union. They organized a team to conduct scientific research based on data collected by Japanese colleagues who had studied the effects of the atomic bombs dropped on Hiroshima and Nagasaki, and drew upon their knowledge of the medical effects of burn, blast, and radiation injuries.

The doctors sounded a warning: that nuclear war would be the final epidemic; that there would be no cure and no meaningful medical response. Their message reached millions of people around the world. In the words of former New Zealand Prime Minister David Lange, "IPPNW made medical reality a part of political reality."

In its first five years, IPPNW, working closely with its US affiliate Physicians for Social Responsibility and IPPNW-Russia, educated health professionals, political leaders, and the public about the medical and environmental consequences of nuclear warfare. For this effort, which united physicians across the Cold War divide, IPPNW was awarded the UNESCO Prize for Peace Education in 1984 and the Nobel Peace Prize in 1985. The Nobel Committee, in its announcement of the award, said IPPNW "has performed a considerable service to mankind by spreading authoritative information and by creating an awareness of the catastrophic consequences of atomic warfare."

Although the Cold War ended with the collapse of the Soviet Union in 1991, the US and Russia retained thousands of nuclear weapons ready to launch. Nuclear proliferation and the threat of nuclear terrorism have added to the danger in the post-Cold-War world.

During the 1990s, IPPNW established an International Commission to Investigate the Health and Environmental Effects of Nuclear Weapons Production and Testing and worked with the Institute for Energy and Environmental Research to document these effects. The Commission produced a series of books including Radioactive Heaven and Earth, Plutonium: The Deadly Gold of the Nuclear Age, and Nuclear Wastelands, a comprehensive study of the health and environmental impact of the global nuclear weapons production complex.

In October 2007, IPPNW and the Royal Society of Medicine co-sponsored a major conference in London to review the current state of knowledge about the effects of nuclear weapons. Scientific data on the global climate effects of regional nuclear war presented at that conference became the basis of an IPPNW project on "nuclear famine". The findings and an updated summary of the medical consequences of nuclear war are available in an IPPNW publication, Zero Is the Only Option: Four Medical and Environmental Cases for Eradicating Nuclear Weapons.

In recent years, IPPNW and its affiliates have drawn new attention to the health and environmental effects of uranium mining and processing, conducting community health surveys in India and challenging Australia's plans to expand its uranium export industry. In 2010, the federation's international council passed a resolution calling for a global ban on uranium mining because of the dangers it poses to health and the environment.

IPPNW has also studied a nuclear danger within the medical profession—the use of highly enriched uranium in reactors that produce medical isotopes—and has campaigned for the conversion of those vulnerable reactors to non-weapons-grade uranium.

IPPNW launched the International Campaign to Abolish Nuclear Weapons (ICAN) in 2007, and is now the lead medical NGO campaigning for a global treaty to ban and eliminate nuclear weapons, along with more than 200 humanitarian, environmental, human rights, peace and development organizations in more than 80 countries. ICAN went on to receive the 2017 Nobel Prize for peace.

In the 1990s, IPPNW expanded its scope to address the continuum of armed violence that undermines health and security. IPPNW is committed to ending war and to addressing the causes of armed conflict from a public health perspective. The global campaign to ban landmines marked IPPNW's first major entry into the non-nuclear arena. The federation became engaged in addressing small arms violence in 2001 when it launched Aiming for Prevention, which has since broadened to include the public health dimensions of all types of armed violence. Aiming for Prevention has been driven by IPPNW affiliates from the global South—primarily Sub-Saharan Africa, Latin America, and South Asia—whose members live and work in areas where armed violence is a constant threat and consumes significant portions of health care budgets.

As part of Aiming for Prevention, IPPNW participated in a broad-based global coalition of civil society organizations that campaigned successfully for passage of the Arms Trade Treaty (ATT). IPPNW is an active participant in the World Health Organization's Violence Prevention Alliance, and coordinates the International Action Network on Small Arms (IANSA) Public Health Network.

Continuing medical education courses in the emerging field of peace through health have been developed by IPPNW with university affiliates in Norway, Denmark, the UK, and Canada. IPPNW supports and encourages academic work to advance the understanding of the interconnections between peace and health.

== Notable members ==
- Dagmar Karin Sørbøe (born 1945), Norwegian physiotherapist and women's rights activist who campaigned against nuclear war

== See also ==
- Anti-nuclear organizations
- International Court of Justice advisory opinion on the Legality of the Threat or Use of Nuclear Weapons
- List of anti-war organizations
- List of books about nuclear issues
- List of films about nuclear issues
- List of peace activists
- Nuclear Weapons: The Road to Zero
- Parliamentarians for Nuclear Non-Proliferation and Disarmament
