= Brennin Hunt =

American actor and singer-songwriter

- Born: April 22, 1985 (age 41); Shawnee, Oklahoma, U.S.
- Occupations: Singer; songwriter; actor
- Musical career
- Genres: pop; country
- Instruments: Vocals; guitar; piano; drums
- Website: brennin.com

Brennin Hunt (born April 22, 1985) is an American actor and singer-songwriter. He competed on the debut season of The X Factor, and played Roger Davis in Fox's television musical Rent: Live. He made his Broadway theatre debut as Edward Lewis in Pretty Woman: The Musical in July 2019. He also appeared in Walking With Herb (2021) as Marco Figureoa.

== Filmography ==
=== Film ===
Year	Title	Role	Notes
2021	Walking with Herb	Marco Figueroa	

=== Television ===
Year	Title	Role	Notes
2015	Nashville	Sullivan Fitzgerald	Episode: "Time Changes Things"
2019	Rent: Live	Roger Davis	Television special

=== Theater ===
Year	Title	Role	Venue	Notes
2019	Pretty Woman: The Musical	Edward Lewis	Nederlander Theatre	Broadway debut
