= Idina Menzel: World Tour =

2015 concert tour by Idina Menzel

- Tour by Idina Menzel
- Start date: May 30, 2015
- End date: October 3, 2015
- No. of shows: 39 in North America; 8 in Europe; 6 in Asia; 53 in total

Idina Menzel concert chronology
- Idina Menzel: Live at Radio City (2014); World Tour (2015); Idina World Tour (2017)

Idina Menzel: World Tour was a concert tour by actress and singer Idina Menzel.

== Performances ==
Following the success of her critically acclaimed one night only concert at Radio City Music Hall and the release of her Christmas album Holiday Wishes, Menzel announced she would embark on her first world tour. She planned 54 concerts in various countries including America, Canada, the United Kingdom, South Korea, Japan, the Philippines and the Netherlands.

In non-English speaking countries, Menzel sang a bilingual version of "Let it Go", singing one of the song's stanzas in the country's language.

== Concert synopsis ==
Menzel is accompanied by a five-piece band, six-piece horn section, and four-piece orchestra. The show begins with video clips projected against a white curtain before Menzel emerges wearing a black strapless dress, starting the show with a lower version of "Defying Gravity: from Wicked and "Don't Rain on My Parade" from Funny Girl.

She then addresses the audience before performing "Brave" and the title track from her 2008 solo album, I Stand. Next, Menzel talks about her role in Wicked and performs a lower version of "The Wizard and I". Next, Menzel pulls up a stool for her cover of "River" from her 2014 Christmas album Holiday Wishes.

Menzel shares a story about an experience she had studying theater at New York University and performs a mashup of Cole Porter's "Love For Sale" and The Police's "Roxanne'" She performs a tribute to Ethel Merman in a medley of "There's No Business Like Show Business", "Anything Goes", and "Everything's Coming Up Roses". Menzel then performs the title track of her debut studio album Still I Can't Be Still and a cover of Radiohead's "Creep".

Menzel then performs "Take Me Or Leave Me" with volunteers from the audience and "No Day But Today" from the musical Rent, paying tribute to Jonathan Larson, its composer. Menzel shares her experience with the Broadway run of If/Then and performs "Always Starting Over" from the musical.

Menzel then introduces her musicians and thanks the audience before performing an a cappella rendition of "For Good" from Wicked and "Let It Go" from Frozen, inviting audience members to perform with her. She then takes a bow, dances with her band, and leaves the stage.

Menzel returns to the stage to perform her new original song "Child" (dedicated to Walker Nathaniel Diggs) and "Tomorrow" from Annie.

== Set list ==
1. "Defying Gravity" from Wicked
2. "Don't Rain on My Parade" from Funny Girl
3. "Brave" from I Stand
4. "I Stand" from I Stand
5. "The Wizard And I" from Wicked
6. "River" from Holiday Wishes
7. "Love for Sale" / "Roxanne"
8. "There's No Business Like Show Business" / "Anything Goes" / "Everything's Coming Up Roses"
9. "Still I Can't Be Still" from Still I Can't Be Still
10. "Creep"
11. "Take Me or Leave Me" from Rent (impromptu duet with chosen audience members)
12. "No Day But Today" from Rent
13. "Always Starting Over" from If/Then
14. "For Good" (a cappella) from Wicked
15. "Let It Go" from Frozen

Encore

1. "Child"
2. "Tomorrow" from Annie

== Critical reception ==
Idina Menzel: World Tour has garnered critical acclaim. Sharon Eberson of the Pittsburgh Post-Gazette wrote that Menzel was "a little bit naughty, a little bit nice and a little bit nutty, but always entertaining ... Each song, each story she told, was like unwrapping an elegantly wrapped package to see what surprise it held inside."

Melissa Ruggieri of The Atlanta Journal-Constitution opined, "What makes her live show so appealing is Menzel herself" because "She's funny." Ruggieri elaborated, "That's the thing about Menzel. Yes, the spotlight that comes with singing songs associated with 'The Wizard of Oz' ... and Disney cartoons ... But Menzel, 44, is an adult. And she sings about adult things". However, Ruggieri cited her performances of original songs "I Stand" and "Still I Can't Be Still", and rendition of "Take Me or Leave Me" alongside five audience members, among "a few moments that didn’t wow."

== Personnel ==
=== Production ===
- Music director/piano: Rob Mounsey
- Tour manager: Scott Cadwallader
- Production coordinator: Courtney Keene
- Front of house engineer: Alex Dakoglou
- Monitor engineer: Chris Trimby
- Backline technician: Brian Clairemont
- Lightning/set designer: Abigail Rosen Holmes
- Lighting programmer: Felix Peralta
- Lighting director: Teddy Sosna
- Stylist: Kemal Harris
- Wardrobe: Joby Horrigan
- Hair stylist: Geo Brian Hennings

=== Musicians ===
- Music director/piano: Rob Mounsey (Europe), Clifford Carter (North America)
- Guitar: John Benthal
- Bass: Sean Hurley
- Drums: Rich Mercurio
- Keyboards: Clifford Carter (Europe), Keith Cotton (North America)
- Menzel is also accompanied by an additional 10 orchestral musicians (strings, woodwinds, and brass) serving as the local orchestra for each city.

== Tour dates ==
Date	City	Country	Venue	Attendance	Revenue
Leg 1 — Asia
May 30, 2015	Seoul	South Korea	Olympic Hall	—	—
June 1, 2015	Osaka	Japan	Osaka-Jo Hall	—	—
June 2, 2015	Nagoya	Japan	Nagoya Aichi Ken Geijutsu Gekijo	—	—
June 4, 2015	Tokyo	Japan	Nippon Budokan	—	—
June 5, 2015	Tokyo	Japan	Nippon Budokan	—	—
June 7, 2015	Pasay	Philippines	Mall of Asia Arena	—	—
Leg 2 — Europe
June 16, 2015	Amsterdam	Netherlands	Royal Theatre Carré	—	—
June 17, 2015	Antwerp	Belgium	Stadsschouwburg	898 / 1,982	$49,153
June 20, 2015	Dublin	Ireland	Bord Gáis Energy Theatre	—	—
June 22, 2015	Birmingham	England	Symphony Hall	—	—
June 23, 2015	Manchester	England	Manchester O_{2} Apollo	—	—
June 24, 2015	Glasgow	Scotland	Royal Concert Hall	—	—
June 26, 2015	Bournemouth	England	Windsor Hall	—	—
June 27, 2015	London	England	SSE Arena	—	—
Leg 3 — North America
July 7, 2015	Richmond	United States	Altria Theater	—	—
July 8, 2015	Baltimore	United States	Hippodrome Theatre	—	—
July 10, 2015	Atlantic City	United States	Borgata	—	—
July 11, 2015	Uncasville	United States	Mohegan Sun Arena	5,669 / 7,236	$254,799
July 12, 2015	Holmdel	United States	PNC Bank Arts Center	—	—
July 14, 2015	Bethlehem	United States	Sands Event Center	—	—
July 16, 2015	Philadelphia	United States	Mann Center for the Performing Arts	—	—
July 17, 2015	Wantagh	United States	Nikon at Jones Beach Theater	—	—
July 18, 2015	Bristow	United States	Jiffy Lube Live	—	—
July 22, 2015	Raleigh	United States	Red Hat Amphitheater	—	—
July 24, 2015	Atlanta	United States	Delta Classic Chastain Park Amphitheater	—	—
July 25, 2015	Orlando	United States	Walt Disney Theater	—	—
July 26, 2015	Boca Raton	United States	Mizner Park	—	—
July 28, 2015	Clearwater	United States	Ruth Eckerd Hall	1,868 / 2,080	$207,157
July 30, 2015	New Orleans	United States	Saenger Theatre	—	—
July 31, 2015	The Woodlands	United States	Cynthia Woods Mitchell Pavilion	—	—
August 1, 2015	Austin	United States	Bass Concert Hall	—	—
August 5, 2015	Seattle	United States	Paramount Theatre	—	—
August 7, 2015	Concord	United States	Concord Pavilion	—	—
August 8, 2015	San Diego	United States	Cal Coast Credit Union Open Air Theatre	—	—
August 9, 2015	Phoenix	United States	Comerica Theatre	—	—
August 11, 2015	Morrison	United States	Red Rocks Amphitheatre	—	—
August 12, 2015	Kansas City	United States	Starlight Theatre	—	—
August 13, 2015	Minneapolis	United States	Northrop Auditorium	—	—
August 15, 2015	Nashville	United States	Ascend Amphitheater	—	—
August 16, 2015	Chicago	United States	Jay Pritzker Pavilion	—	—
August 18, 2015	Cincinnati	United States	PNC Pavilion at Riverbend Center	—	—
August 19, 2015	Columbus	United States	Palace Theatre	—	—
August 21, 2015	Cuyahoga Falls	United States	Blossom Music Center	—	—
August 22, 2015	Detroit	United States	Fox Theatre	—	—
August 23, 2015	Indianapolis	United States	Murat Theatre	—	—
August 25, 2015	Pittsburgh	United States	Benedum Center	—	—
August 26, 2015	Norfolk	United States	Chrysler Hall	—	—
August 28, 2015	Boston	United States	Leader Bank Pavilion	—	—
August 29, 2015	Lenox	United States	Tanglewood	—	—
August 30, 2015	Canandaigua	United States	Constellation Brands – Marvin Sands Performing Arts Center	—	—
September 1, 2015	Montreal	Canada	Salle Wilfrid-Pelletier	—	—
September 2, 2015	Toronto	Canada	Sony Centre for the Performing Arts	—	—
October 1, 2015	Orem	United States	UCCU Center	—	—
October 3, 2015	Los Angeles	United States	Hollywood Bowl	11,617 / 17,469	$954,687
Total				20,052 / 28,767 (68.7%)	$1,465,800
