= Idina Menzel: Live at Radio City =

2014 concert by Idina Menzel

- Concert by Idina Menzel
- Promotional poster of the concert
- Venue: Radio City Music Hall, New York City
- Date: June 16, 2014
- Duration: 120 minutes
- No. of shows: 1

Idina Menzel concert chronology
- Barefoot at the Symphony Tour 2010-2013; Idina Menzel: Live at Radio City 2014; Idina Menzel: World Tour 2015

Idina Menzel: Live at Radio City was a concert by American singer-songwriter and actress Idina Menzel at Radio City Music Hall in New York City, New York on June 16, 2014. In the wake of the success of Disney's popular animated film Frozen (2013), in which Menzel starred as Elsa, Menzel announced in April 2014 that she will be headlining a one-night-only concert at Radio City Music Hall on her break from her eight shows a week.

The set list of the two-hour long show featured mostly songs from Menzel's various Broadway stints, specifically Rent, Wicked and If/Then, as well as original songs from the singer's studio albums, covers of U2 and Radiohead, and ending with a highly anticipated rendition of the Academy Award-winning "Let it Go" from Frozen. She was accompanied by a 35-piece orchestra under the direction of arranger and pianist Rob Mounsey. Menzel also announced her plans to release a holiday album later that year.

Both a critical and commercial success, the concert was sold out and received very positive reviews from critics, who praised Menzel's live vocals and humor. Menzel fell victim to a wardrobe malfunction.

Following the success of the one night only Radio City concert, Menzel announced a week after the release of her holiday album that she will embark on her very first World Tour.

== Background ==
Spearheaded by the unprecedented critical and commercial success of Disney's animated film Frozen (2013), in which Menzel stars as Elsa and performs the film's Academy Award-winning song "Let it Go", the singer and actress ultimately achieved "international stardom." Additionally, Menzel, deemed the magazine's "(Not So) New 'It' Girl", appeared on the cover of Billboard on March 29, 2014, which was soon followed by an appearance on the cover of the April 22, 2014 issue of Variety as one of New York's "most powerful women".

In February 2013, Entertainment Weekly confirmed that Menzel is expected to return to Broadway for the first time in ten years since leaving the original cast of Wicked to originate the role of Elizabeth Vaughn in the musical If/Then in spring 2014.

In May 2014, Broadway.com asked its readers to vote for "Which Song MUST If/Then Star Idina Menzel Include in Her Live at Radio City Concert". Ultimately, twenty-seven percent of readers voted for "Defying Gravity" from Wicked, while Frozen's "Let it Go", which garnered nineteen percent of votes, ranked second. Other popular songs included "Take Me or Leave Me" from Rent, "The Wizard and I" from Wicked and "Always Starting Over" from If/Then, which garnered seven percent each.

== Concert synopsis ==
Menzel performs a diverse selection of songs from her Broadway career (including hits from Wicked, Rent, and If/Then), along with original songs from some of her various solo albums, Pop and Rock covers, and a much anticipated performance of her Oscar-winning song "Let It Go" from Disney's Frozen. Throughout the concert, Menzel interacts with the audience sharing stories from her early younger years in Long Island, NY and reenacting her life at Intermission on Broadway.

== Reception ==
Idina Menzel: Live at Radio City has garnered critical acclaim. Erin Strecker of Entertainment Weekly called the concert "incredible." Praising Menzel's humor, Strecker wrote, "In between over two hours of powerhouse performances, Menzel acted like a total goof, whether she was giving a fake Tony acceptance speech ... or pretending to call ex-husband Taye Diggs from stage ... to remind him she was singing to a sold-out crowd." Praising Menzel's vocal performance, The New York Times' Stephen Holden opined that the singer's "high soprano register is a primal cry embedded in her being that insists that we listen and pay attention ... For Ms. Menzel, that cry, whether she likes it or not, is money in the bank, because it insists on an emotional response." Additionally, Holden described her showmanship as refreshingly "real"; "quirky, high-strung and far from angelic." Giving the concert a perfect score of five stars, Markos Papadatos of Digital Journal hailed Menzel's voice as "a musical wonder". Papadatos continued that the singer "gave Radio City Music Hall an evening of Broadway hits and classic tunes to remember", concluding, "Her vocals were pleasant, crystalline and she sang in perfect pitch ... prov[ing] to not only be one talented vocalist, but a true song stylist as well, where she could take any song and make it her own, with her unique Broadway twist to it." Despite acknowledging the "few uncertain receptions throughout the night", Suzy Evans of The Hollywood Reporter wrote that the singer "made the dreams of show queens of all ages come true ... prov[ing] that she’s still just the classy broad from Long Island".

In a somewhat more mixed review, Variety's Scott Foundas began,"Throughout the night, Menzel seemed slightly stymied by the demands of belting out song after song in a concert setting, stretching out the beats between numbers with lots of off-the-cuff chatter ... Elsewhere, the show felt under-rehearsed ... especially during a lengthy 'intermission' section". Foundas concluded, "But by the time Menzel was turning her signature Rent number, 'Take Me Or Leave Me,' into an impromptu duet with random audience members, she’d clearly gotten her mojo back, and proceeded to barrel on through a lively if schizophrenic set list".

== Set list ==
1. "Defying Gravity" from Wicked
2. "Brave" from I Stand
3. "Love for Sale / Roxanne"
4. "Both Sides Now"
5. "Still I Can't Be Still" from Still I Can't Be Still
6. "God Save My Soul"
7. "There’s No Business Like Show Business" / "Anything Goes" / "Everything’s Coming Up Roses"
8. "Creep"
9. "Take Me or Leave Me" from Rent (impromptu duet with chosen audience members)
10. "No Day But Today" from Rent
11. "I Still Haven't Found What I'm Looking For / In Your Eyes"
12. "December Prayer" (sneak preview from Holiday Wishes)
13. "Always Starting Over" from If/Then
14. "For Good" (a cappella) from Wicked
15. "Let It Go" from Frozen

Encores:

1. "You Learn to Live Without" from If/Then
2. "I'll Be Seeing You"
