= Dagmar Karin Sørbøe =

Norwegian physician (born 1945)

Dagmar Karin Sørbøe or Sørbø (born 5 May 1945) is a Norwegian physiotherapist, physician and activist.

She was born in Neuenburg, Germany, but grew up at Vettakollen. After her education as a physiotherapist in Göttingen in 1968, she worked as a physiotherapist in Switzerland, Sweden and Norway before enrolling in medicine at the Christian-Albrecht University of Kiel. She later graduated from the University of Oslo with the cand.med. degree in 1979. In 1976 she was a co-founder of Norway's first women's shelter, the Camilla Center. As a physician, she worked in the borough health service of Oslo. She was an activist in the International Physicians for the Prevention of Nuclear War, the Women's International League for Peace and Freedom and the Women's Partnership for Peace in the Middle East.
