= Joseph Jay Deiss =

American writer (1912–1999)

Joseph Jay Deiss (1912–1999), an American author, businessman, historian and archaeologist, was born in Twin Falls, Idaho and graduated from the University of Texas, where he also received his master's degree.

== Life and work ==
Deiss was born in Twin Falls, Idaho, the son of Charlotte (Neilson) and Joseph John Deiss, a rancher. By location, he had three loves, Cape Cod, Italy, and Florida. With the proceeds from his first successful novel, Washington Story, he purchased the "Oysterman's Cottage" at Wellfleet, Massachusetts, mentioned by Henry David Thoreau in "Cape Cod Sketches".

Prior to his first novel, he worked in Washington, DC in Farm Tenancy under the New Deal. As a partner in the Medical Pharmaceutical and Information Bureau, Deiss expanded his career into "industrial public relations" with clients in the pharmaceutical industry, specifically Pfizer. As a result of his continuing interest in writing and in the history of Italy, he decided to give up his business partnership, and devote full-time to his writing, which resulted in his second novel, The Blue Chips, a novel about big business medicine.

In 1957 Deiss, living in Positano, Italy, began in depth research at museums and academic institutions in Germany, Austria, and Italy that led to his third work, a biographical novel, The Great Infidel, about Frederic the Second, Holy Roman Emperor and King of Sicily. While Deiss was involved in his biographical novel of Frederic the Second, he was drawn to the ancient monument cities of Herculaneum and Pompeii, spending time there since they were near his home in Positano. On becoming Vice Director of the American Academy in Rome, he actively started exploring these ancient cities. Out of this effort he wrote, Herculaneum, Italy's Buried Treasure. This was followed by Captains of Fortune, which consisted of profiles of six famous Italian Condottieri (soldiers of fortune) from the medieval period to the renaissance. The eclectic interests of Deiss in historical Italy finally led to his The Roman Years of Margaret Fuller.

In 1971, for his historical work relating to Italy, he was Knighted by that government. In his later years, Deiss devoted his time to both Cape Cod and his home in Gainesville, Florida, where he was an adjunct professor in the Classics Department of the University of Florida. Joseph Jay Deiss died on April 10, 1999. He was predeceased by his wife, Catherene (Dohoney), son John Casey ("Casey"), and was survived by his daughter, Susanna, and grandchildren.

His grandson-in-law is actor Adam Pascal.

== Selected list of works ==
- A Washington Story by Jay Deiss, Duell, Sloan and Pearce, New York, 1950.
- The Blue Chips by Jay Deiss, Simon and Schuster, New York, 1957.
- The Great Infidel by Joseph Jay Deiss, Random House, New York, 1963.
- Herculaneum Italy's Buried Treasure by Joseph Jay Deiss, Thomas Y. Crowell Company, New York 1966.
- Captains of Fortune, Profiles of Six Italian Condottieri by Joseph Jay Deiss, Victor Gollancz Ltd., London, 1966.
- The Roman Years of Margaret Fuller by Joseph Jay Deiss, Thomas Y, Crowell Company, New York, 1969.
- "The Town of Hercules, A Buried Treasure Trove" by Joseph Jay Deiss, The J. Paul Getty Museum, 1995
