= Adam Pascal =

American actor (born 1970)

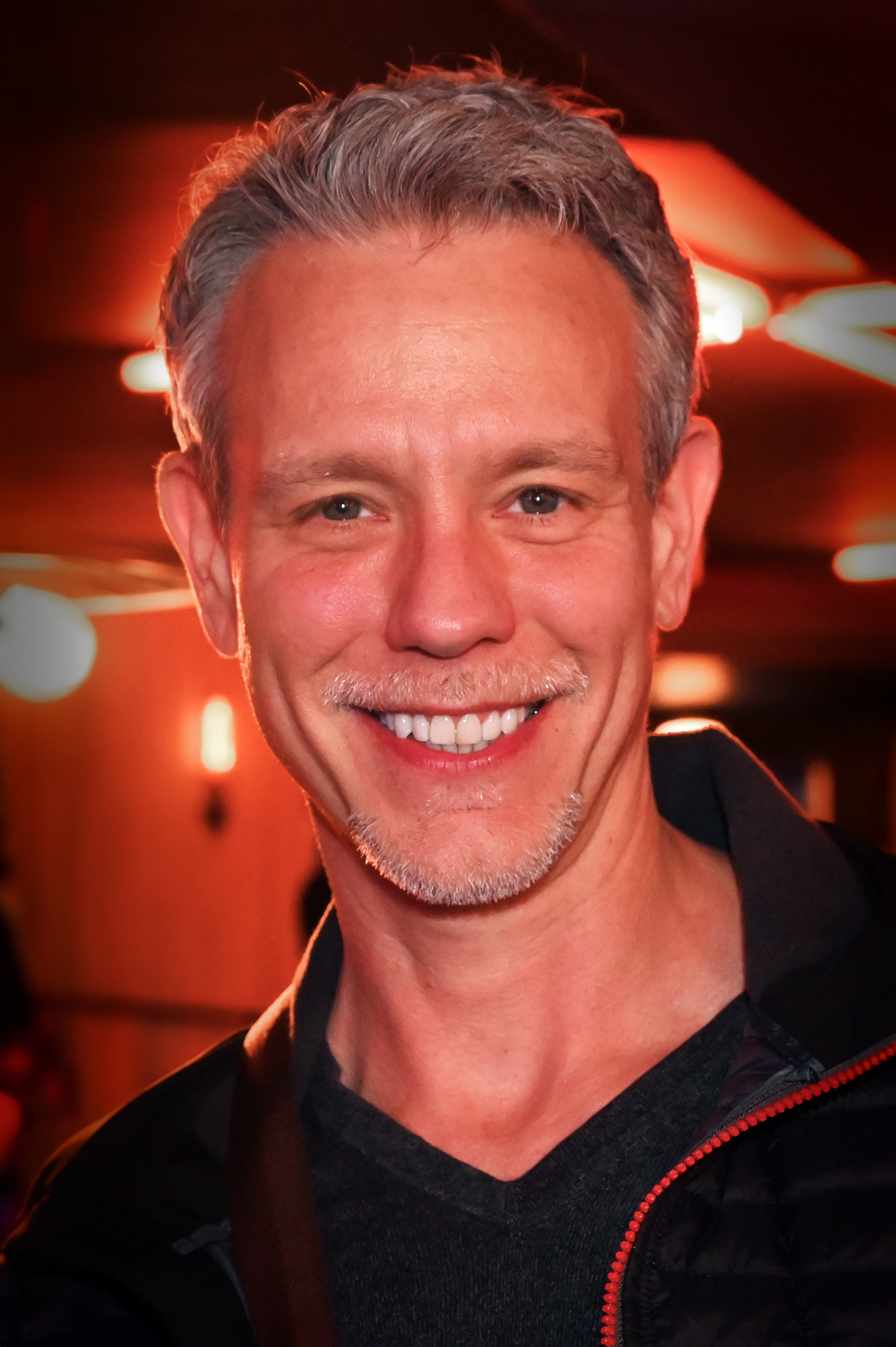
- Pascal in 2024
- Born: October 25, 1970 (age 56); Bronx, New York, U.S.
- Occupations: Actor; musician
- Years active: 1993–present
- Spouse: Cybele Chivian (m. 1998; sep. 2021)
- Children: 2

Adam Pascal (born October 25, 1970) is an American actor, known for his performance as Roger Davis in the original Broadway and West End productions of Jonathan Larson's musical Rent, the 2005 movie version of the musical, and the Broadway tour of Rent in 2009. He is also known for originating the role of Radames in Elton John and Tim Rice's Aida, for playing the Emcee in the 1998 revival of Cabaret, for playing Freddie Trumper in Chess at the New Amsterdam Theatre and Royal Albert Hall, and for playing Huey Calhoun in the Broadway company of Memphis. More recently, he played William Shakespeare in the Tony Award-winning musical Something Rotten!

== Early life ==
Pascal was born in The Bronx, New York, and grew up in Woodbury, Nassau County, New York, with his mother, Wendy (née Frishman), and stepfather, Mel Seamon. He was raised Jewish. He attended Stagedoor Manor summer camp and graduated from Syosset High School. He then graduated from New York Institute of Technology. Before his interest in music, he was a personal trainer. Although he began as a rock musician playing in a number of bands (such as Mute) formed with his schoolmates, Pascal became drawn to musical theater.

== Career ==
=== Stage work ===
A friend of his from high school (Idina Menzel's boyfriend at the time) mentioned Rent to him. On a whim, he auditioned and was cast as the HIV-positive rock guitarist Roger Davis. His powerful tenor voice and his performance in Rent earned him a Tony nomination, a Theater World award, and an Obie Award. He left the show on November 2, 1997, but went on to reprise Roger when Rent opened in London.

The role helped Pascal gain fame on Broadway, and he was cast in the Elton John and Tim Rice musical Aida as the Egyptian general Radames with the original and final casts (former Rent castmate Idina Menzel would co-star as Amneris in 2001), and Kander and Ebb's Cabaret, appearing in the show as the Emcee (closing cast). He also participated in several charity performances, including Chess in 2003 (playing the American, Freddie Trumper), Hair in 2004 (singing "I Got Life"), and the 24 Hour Plays in 2005. He returned to Aida in 2004 to close the run of the show as Radames.

Along with original Broadway Rent cast member Anthony Rapp (Mark Cohen), Pascal returned to Broadway to star as Roger in Rent from July 30 to October 7, 2007. In January 2009, he and Rapp reprised their originating (and film) roles as Roger and Mark in Rent: The Broadway Tour, which played in many cities in North America, as well as stops in Japan and South Korea. At the tour's Detroit, Michigan stop in February, Pascal suffered two herniated discs in his neck and was on medical leave for a week. His role was filled in by Cary Shields, who had played Roger in the Broadway, Canadian, "Benny" National Tour productions. Pascal made a full recovery and finished up the tour in early 2010. This tour closed on February 7, 2010.

Pascal reprised the role of Frederick Trumper, aka "Freddie, The American" in the London concert version of Chess at the Royal Albert Hall on May 12–13, 2008. His Rent and Aida co-star Idina Menzel played Florence. This performance was recorded; it has been televised, first on American and British television on June 17, 2009, and repeatedly in America on PBS stations as part of that network's "Great Performances" series; and has been released on DVD.

Pascal joined the Broadway cast of Memphis on October 25, 2011, as Huey Calhoun. He replaced original cast member Chad Kimball in the role. He remained in the Memphis cast until the show's closure on August 5, 2012.

Beginning April 8, 2013, Pascal starred as Billy Flynn in the long-running Broadway revival of Chicago. His last performance as Billy was June 16, 2013.

On November 7, 2016, Pascal joined the Broadway company of Something Rotten! as William Shakespeare in the show's closing cast. He also played the same role for the entirety of the show's first national tour alongside Rob McClure, Josh Grisetti, and Leah Hofmann, who were also in the closing cast of the show.

In late 2021, Pascal began performances as Edward Lewis in the U.S national tour of Pretty Woman: The Musical, a role which he had played on Broadway from January 15 to 20, 2019.

Pascal was cast as Ryuk in the English premiere of Death Note: the Musical for its concert run at the London Palladium in August 2023. Pascal directed a production of Rent for Long Island's From Stage to Screen, with performances running from July 28 to July 30, 2023. Pascal was set to direct Something Rotten! at Stage to Screen on Long Island but it was ultimately cancelled.

On November 4, 2024, it was announced that Pascal would be joining the off-Broadway musical, Drag: The Musical as the token straight man, Tom Hutchinson.

Pascal is scheduled to play Jesus in Jesus Christ Superstar at Studio Tenn in May 2026.

=== Music ===
Pascal believed he was looked upon solely as a Broadway singer, and thus returned to his rock and roll roots with a solo recording contract on Sh-K-Boom Records, which was founded by his Aida costar, Sherie Rene Scott and her husband Kurt Deutsch. He has released two solo rock albums, Model Prisoner (2000) and Civilian (2004), as well as a collaborative rock album Blinding Light (2008) with pianist Larry Edoff. He also contributed a cover of Billy Joel's "New York State of Mind" to the CD Broadway Cares: Home for the Holidays (2001); the end credits song, "Winter Light", from the movie Noel (2004); and the song "Perfect Place" on the album Listen which showcases songs written by adolescents who stutter (2009). In School of Rock, he played Theo, lead singer of the band No Vacancy, and sang on two songs on the soundtrack.

On July 4, 2006, Pascal took part in the Macy's 4th of July Fireworks and sang during the traditional fireworks display. He also performed in both the fifth- and tenth-anniversary celebrations of Rent on Broadway, in 2000 and 2005, respectively.

Pascal formed the band "Me and Larry (Edoff)" in 2006. The two musicians began composing and performing original material and reworked Broadway songs in small venues throughout the US. Pascal won the 2007–2008 Golden Icon Award for Best Small Venue Concert. The band's first CD, Blinding Light, was released in May 2008 on Pascal's own label. The CD is available at concerts and through Amazon and the band's website (where a direct digital download is available).

As of 2009 and later, Pascal is developing a theatrical stage version of the classic 1988 concept album, Operation: Mindcrime by the progressive metal band, Queensrÿche. The band is one of Pascal's musical influences, and has fully endorsed his efforts.

=== Film work ===
Pascal made his film debut in SLC Punk! (1999) and also appeared in School of Rock (2003) and Temptation (2004). The audio for Temptation, a musical, was recorded live on set during filming.

In late 2005, he, along with five other members of the principal original cast, reprised their roles in the film version of Rent, directed by Chris Columbus. Pop idol Justin Timberlake was considered for the role of Roger, but Columbus decided to stick with the original cast members. The film was released on November 23, 2005.

In the independent movie Falling Star (formerly titled Goyband), Pascal stars as a former boy-band icon who is booked to play a show at a Kosher hotel but ends up shocking the guests with his sexy show. Fans were invited to participate in the movie as extras for the concert scenes. His co-stars are Amy Davidson, Cris Judd, Tovah Feldshuh, Dean Edwards, Tibor Feldman, and Natasha Lyonne. Goyband originally premiered at the Jerusalem Films Festival in December 2008. Its North American premiere was July 2009, on Long Island. The movie was bought by distributor MarVista Entertainment, which retitled it Falling Star.

Pascal also filmed another independent movie, Wild About Harry, about a gay couple who try to hide their relationship from family and neighbors in 1973, a few years following the Stonewall Riots.

Pascal reprised his role from SLC Punk! in the 2015 sequel, Punk's Dead.

In 2015, Pascal starred in Alleluia! The Devil's Carnival as The Agent, one of God's top generals in Heaven.

=== Television ===
Pascal had a guest role as Dennis Hofferman, a murder victim, on an episode of Cold Case, with Tracie Thoms, his co-star from the film version of Rent, and Laura Bell Bundy, another Broadway star who originated the role of Elle Woods in Legally Blonde. The episode, called "Willkommen", originally aired on April 2, 2006, and revolved around a regional theatre production of Cabaret.

Pascal provided the narration and sang a song, "I'm Not an Egg Anymore", in the double-length episode "Tale of the Mighty Knights" for the show The Backyardigans.

== Personal life ==
On December 19, 1998, Pascal married Cybele Chivian, the daughter of Eric S. Chivian, M.D., Director of the Center for Health and the Global Environment at Harvard Medical School, and the granddaughter of writer Joseph Jay Deiss. The couple has two sons. Pascal and Chivian separated in 2021.

== Discography ==
- Mute – c. 1994
- Model Prisoner – 2000
- Civilian – 2004
- Blinding Light (with Larry Edoff) – 2008
- The New Standards (with Larry Edoff) – 2015

== Stage credits ==
Ref:

Year(s)	Production	Role	Location	Category
1996–97	Rent	Roger Davis	Nederlander Theatre	Broadway
1998	Rent	Roger Davis	Shaftesbury Theatre	West End
2000–03	Aida	Radames	Palace Theatre	Broadway
2003	Fully Committed	—N/a	Lyceum Theatre	Off-Broadway (co-producer)
2003	Chess	Freddie Trumper	New Amsterdam Theatre	Concert
2003–04	Cabaret	The Emcee (closing cast)	Studio 54	Broadway
2004	Aida	Radames (closing cast)	Palace Theatre	Broadway
2004	Hair	—N/a	New Amsterdam Theatre	Concert (sung "I Got Life")
2005	The 24 Hour Plays	—N/a	American Airlines Theatre	Benefit
2007	Rent	Roger Davis (replacement)	Nederlander Theatre	Broadway
2008	Alive in the World	—N/a	Zipper Theatre	Benefit
2008	Chess	Freddie Trumper	Royal Albert Hall	Concert
2008	Drift	—N/a	B.B. King Blues Club	Concert
2009–10	Rent	Roger Davis	—N/a	US National Tour
2011	The Real Love: A New Musical	Rolf	Pasadena Civic Auditorium	Concert
2011–12	Memphis	Huey Calhoun (replacement)	Shubert Theatre	Broadway
2013	Chicago	Billy Flynn (replacement)	Ambassador Theatre	Broadway
2016	Disaster!	Chad	Nederlander Theatre	Broadway
2016–17	Something Rotten!	William Shakespeare / The Bard	St. James Theatre	Broadway
2017-18	Something Rotten!	William Shakespeare / The Bard	—N/a	US National Tour
2019	Pretty Woman: The Musical	Edward Lewis (replacement)	Nederlander Theatre	Broadway
2019	The Music Man	Harold Hill	Thousand Oaks Civic Arts Plaza	Regional
2021–23	Pretty Woman: The Musical	Edward Lewis	—N/a	US National Tour
2022	Next to Normal	Dr. Madden	Ideal Barcelona	Immersive production
2023	Death Note	Ryuk	London Palladium	West End
2024–25	Drag: The Musical	Tom Hutchinson	New World Stages	Off-Broadway
2026	Jesus Christ Superstar	Jesus	Studio Tenn	Regional

== Filmography ==
=== Film and television ===
Year	Title	Role	Notes
1998	SLC Punk!	Eddie	
2003	School of Rock	Theo	
2004	Temptation	Nicholi	
2005	Rent	Roger Davis	Appeared with most of the original stage cast members
2006	Cold Case	Dennis Hofferman	Episode: "Willkommen", appeared alongside Rent co-star Tracie Thoms
2008	The Backyardigans	Narrator/Dragon (voice)	Episode: "Tale of the Mighty Knights"
2008	Goyband	Bobby Starr	Also known as Falling Star
2009	Wild About Harry	Theodore Gibbs	Also known as American Primitive
2012	Submissions Only	Brent Jarvis	Episode: "The Growing Interconnectedness"
2015	Tales of Halloween	The Dentist	Segment: "The Night Billy Raised Hell"
2016	Punk's Dead	Eddie	Sequel to 1999's SLC Punk!
2016	Alleluia! The Devil's Carnival	The Agent	Sequel to 2012's The Devil's Carnival
2019	Rent: Live	Himself	Television special
2021	Tick, Tick... Boom!	"Sunday" Legend	
2021	Hawkeye	Lead New Yorker #1	2 episodes

=== Music videos ===
Year	Title	Role	Notes
2008	"Single Drop of You"	Himself	

== Awards and nominations ==
Year	Award	Category	Work	Result
1996	Tony Award	Best Performance by a Leading Actor in a Musical	Rent	Nominated
1996	Drama Desk Award	Outstanding Actor in a Musical	Rent	Nominated
1996	Theatre World Award	Theatre World Award	Rent	Won
2006	Broadcast Film Critics Association	Best Song ("Seasons of Love")	Rent	Nominated
2006	Broadcast Film Critics Association	Best Acting Ensemble	Rent	Nominated
2006	Online Film & Television Association Award	Best Music, Adapted Song ("Light My Candle")	Rent	Nominated
2006	Online Film & Television Association Award	Best Music, Adapted Song ("Seasons of Love")	Rent	Nominated
