= Rent (film) =

2005 film by Chris Columbus

- Theatrical release poster
- Directed by: Chris Columbus
- Screenplay by: Stephen Chbosky
- Based on: Rent by Jonathan Larson; La bohème by Giacomo Puccini; Luigi Illica; Giuseppe Giacosa; Scenes of Bohemian Life by Henri Murger
- Produced by: Jane Rosenthal; Robert De Niro; Chris Columbus; Mark Radcliffe; Michael Barnathan
- Starring: Rosario Dawson; Taye Diggs; Wilson Jermaine Heredia; Jesse L. Martin; Idina Menzel; Adam Pascal; Anthony Rapp; Tracie Thoms
- Cinematography: Stephen Goldblatt
- Edited by: Richard Pearson
- Music by: Jonathan Larson
- Production companies: Columbia Pictures; Revolution Studios; 1492 Pictures; Tribeca Productions
- Distributed by: Sony Pictures Releasing
- Release dates: November 17, 2005 (Ziegfeld Theatre); November 23, 2005 (United States)
- Running time: 135 minutes
- Country: United States
- Language: English
- Budget: $40 million
- Box office: $31.7 million

Rent is a 2005 American musical drama film directed by Chris Columbus. It is an adaptation of Jonathan Larson's 1996 Broadway musical of the same name, in turn based on the 1896 opera La bohème by Giacomo Puccini, Luigi Illica and Giuseppe Giacosa, which is itself based on the 1851 novel Scenes of Bohemian Life by Henri Murger.

The film, which features six of the eight original Broadway cast members reprising their lead roles, (Note: The Broadway originator in the role of Mimi, Daphne Rubin-Vega, was pregnant at the time of the movie's casting and filming.) (Note: The Broadway originator in the role of Joanne, Fredi Walker, had been the oldest of the main cast when the stage production premiered in 1996 – older at that time than some of the main cast were by the time of the film. She stated that she was not offered the film role due to her age, but did request that the producers cast an actress of African descent for the film.) depicts the lives of several bohemians and their struggles with sexuality, drugs, paying their rent, and life under the shadow of AIDS in the gritty East Village of New York City from 1989 to 1990.

Rent was produced by Columbia Pictures, Revolution Studios, 1492 Pictures and Tribeca Productions and released by Sony Pictures Releasing on November 23, 2005. The film received mixed reviews from critics and failed to cover its production costs at the box office, grossing $31.7 million against a $40 million budget.

== Plot ==
The movie starts with 8 friends (Mark, Roger, Mimi, Collins, Angel, Maureen, Joanne, and Benny) standing on a stage in front of an empty audience singing "Seasons of Love". On Christmas Eve 1989, aspiring filmmaker Mark Cohen and his roommate, Roger Davis, learn that the rent previously waived by their old friend and now landlord, Benjamin "Benny" Coffin III, is due ("Rent"). Meanwhile, their former roommate, Tom Collins, shows up and gets mugged. Mark and Roger meet with Benny, who tells them he plans to evict the homeless from the nearby lot and build a cyber studio ("You'll See"). He offers them free rent if they get Maureen Johnson, Mark's ex-girlfriend, to cancel her protest against his plans, but they refuse.

A street drummer, Angel Dumott Schunard, finds Collins, and they bond since they are both HIV positive. Roger, who is also HIV-positive as well as a former drug addict, tries to compose one last great song before he dies ("One Song Glory"). He's visited by his downstairs neighbor, Mimi Marquez, an erotic dancer and heroin addict who tries to convince him to do heroin together despite her own HIV+ status ("Light My Candle").

On Christmas Day, Mark and Roger are visited by Collins and Angel, now in full drag, bearing gifts ("Today 4 U"). They invite Mark and Roger to attend Life Support, an AIDS support group. Roger turns them down, while Mark goes to fix Maureen's sound equipment. He runs into Joanne Jefferson, Maureen's new girlfriend, who bonds with him as they discuss Maureen's promiscuity ("Tango: Maureen"). Mark arrives at the Life Support meeting ("Life Support"). He films the meeting for the documentary that he's making about people living with HIV/AIDS.

That night, Mimi visits Roger ("Out Tonight"). Roger, whose ex-girlfriend died by suicide after discovering she (and Roger) were HIV positive, rebukes her advances and throws her out ("Another Day"). The next day, he joins Mark, Collins, and Angel at a Life Support meeting ("Will I?"). Leaving the meeting, the group imagines what it would be like to move to Santa Fe, New Mexico ("Santa Fe"). Roger and Mark leave to help Maureen set up for her performance, and Angel and Collins reveal they are falling in love ("I'll Cover You"). Maureen performs her song, which calls out Benny for changing who he was after getting married and blames him for trying to shut down the tent city ("Over the Moon"). The performance starts a riot because Benny called in police to make sure the protest stayed peaceful, but it escalates into violence. Once the protest is over, the group goes to The Life Cafe and celebrates Mark selling his riot footage to a local news station ("La Vie Bohème" or "La Vie Bohème A"). Roger and Mimi reveal they are falling for each other, and reveal they are HIV positive ("I Should Tell You"). They kiss, start a relationship, and continue celebrating with their friends ("Viva La Vie Bohème!" or "La Vie Bohème B").

On New Year's Day, the 8 friends (all except Benny) get back from celebrating (Seasons of Love B) when they find out that Benny has padlocked the apartment, but Angel breaks the lock with a garbage can. Mark takes a job at Buzzline, the television news program to which he sold his riot footage. After another fight, Maureen proposes to Joanne; the relationship ends when Maureen flirts with another woman at the engagement party ("Take Me or Leave Me"). After being persuaded by Mimi, his ex-girlfriend, Benny gives the group back their apartment. Over the following year, Roger grows distrustful of Mimi due to her massive usage of drugs, and their relationship ends ("Without You"). Angel becomes more ill and eventually succumbs to AIDS. At Angel's funeral on Halloween (I'll Cover You (Reprise)), the group goes their separate ways after a bitter argument, although Maureen and Joanne reconcile in the process (Goodbye Love).

Roger sells his guitar, buys a car, and moves to Santa Fe. He eventually returns to New York because he still loves Mimi, while Mark quits his job at Buzzline to pursue his own film ("What You Own").

On Christmas Eve 1990, Mark and Roger reunite with Collins, who reveals that he has reprogrammed an ATM to dispense cash when someone inputs the code: A-N-G-E-L. Joanne and Maureen find Mimi on the streets, near death (Finale A). Mimi and Roger reconcile, and he sings the song that he has written over the past year (Your Eyes). Mimi appears to die but suddenly awakens. She tells them that she was heading to the light, but Angel told her to go back. As Mark's documentary is shown for the first time, the friends reaffirm that there is "no day but today" ("Finale B").

== Cast ==
=== Main ===
- Anthony Rapp as Mark Cohen, a struggling Jewish filmmaker and Roger's roommate. He was dumped by Maureen for Joanne.
- Adam Pascal as Roger Davis, an HIV-positive ex-addict rock musician; Mimi's love interest.
- Rosario Dawson as Mimi Marquez, an HIV-positive heroin addict and stripper; Roger's love interest.
- Jesse L. Martin as Thomas B. "Tom" Collins, an anarchist and gay philosophy professor who is HIV-positive; former roommate of Maureen, Roger, Mark, and Benny; Angel's love interest.
- Wilson Jermaine Heredia as Angel Dumott Schunard, a drag queen and street musician who is suffering from AIDS; Collins' love interest.
- Idina Menzel as Maureen Johnson, a bisexual performance artist and Joanne's girlfriend; Mark's ex-girlfriend.
- Tracie Thoms as Joanne Jefferson, a lesbian Harvard-graduate lawyer and Maureen's love interest.
- Taye Diggs as Benjamin "Benny" Coffin III, landlord of the building in which Mark, Roger, and Mimi live and ex-roommate of Collins, Roger, Maureen, and Mark.

=== Minor ===
- Aaron Lohr as Steve
- Sarah Silverman as Alexi Darling
- Wayne Wilcox as Gordon
- Anna Deavere Smith as Mrs. Jefferson, Joanne's mother
- Daryl Edwards as Mr. Jefferson, Joanne's father
- Daniel London as Paul
- Aisha de Haas as Blanket Woman

== Alternate ending ==
In addition to four deleted scenes, the DVD release of the film includes an alternate ending, showing all the main characters (including Benny, who was not present in the other ending) except Angel standing in the positions where they were during the "Seasons of Love" opening, all standing in a line of spotlights, with Angel's spot empty. Later in the scene, she enters from the side and walks down the line to take her place, stopping as she passes Collins to take his hand for a moment. Although this tableau is used in the finale of the musical, it was dropped from the film for fear that audiences may have wondered why Angel had returned or why the characters were lined up on stage again. In the commentary, Chris Columbus adds that he "didn't want audiences to think that everything was okay and Angel was alive again."

== Differences between the stage and film versions ==
- "Goodbye Love" was filmed in its entirety, but the second half was cut from the film because Columbus considered it somewhat of an emotional overload, as he states on the DVD's commentary track.
- The film leaves ambiguous the death of Roger's girlfriend April, who dies before Rent begins. In the film, she is seen reading a doctor's report that she is HIV positive; it is stated that she has died, but nothing more is said. In the stage version, Mark explicitly states that April ended her life by slitting her wrists in the bathroom, and Roger found out about his HIV status in the suicide note. Chris Columbus states in the DVD commentary that a scene featuring April lying in the bathtub with her wrists slit was filmed, but cut because he thought it would be "too much".

== Soundtrack ==
Rent: Original Motion Picture Soundtrack is the soundtrack album to the 2005 film of the same name. The two-disc soundtrack, containing 28 tracks, was originally packaged in eight different slipcovers, each featuring one of the eight most prominent characters in the film.

=== Track listing ===
1. "Seasons of Love" – Joanne, Collins, Mimi, Roger, Maureen, Mark, Angel & Benny
2. "Rent" – Mark, Roger, Collins, Mimi, Benny & Tenants
3. "You'll See" – Roger, Mark & Benny
4. "One Song Glory" – Roger
5. "Light My Candle" – Roger & Mimi
6. "Today 4 U" – Angel & Collins, & Mark
7. "Tango: Maureen" – Joanne & Mark
8. "Life Support" – Mark, Angel, Collins, Gordon, Steve, Paul, Ali, Pam, & Sue
9. "Out Tonight" – Mimi
10. "Another Day" – Roger, Mimi, Collins, Mark & Angel
11. "Will I?" – Roger, Angel, Collins, Mark, Gordon, Steve, Paul, Ali, Pam & Sue
12. "Santa Fe" – Angel, Collins, Roger & Mark
13. "I'll Cover You" – Angel & Collins
14. "Over The Moon" – Maureen
15. "La Vie Bohème" – Cast of Rent
16. "I Should Tell You" – Roger & Mimi
17. "La Vie Bohème B" – Cast of Rent
18. "Seasons of Love B" – Cast of Rent
19. "Take Me or Leave Me" – Maureen & Joanne
20. "Without You" – Mimi & Roger
21. "I'll Cover You (Reprise)" – Collins & Company
22. "Halloween" (Deleted Scene) – Mark
23. "Goodbye Love" – Mimi, Roger, Benny, Maureen, Joanne, Mark & Collins
24. "What You Own" – Roger & Mark
25. "Finale A" – Mimi & Roger
26. "Your Eyes" – Roger
27. "Finale B* " – Cast of Rent
28. "Love Heals" (Deleted Scene) – Cast of Rent

== Reception ==
=== Critical response ===
On the review aggregator website Rotten Tomatoes, 47% of 175 critics' reviews are positive, with an average rating of 5.9/10. The website's consensus reads: "Fans of the stage musical may forgive Rent its flaws, but weak direction, inescapable staginess and an irritating faux-boho pretension prevent the film from connecting on screen." Metacritic, which uses a weighted average, assigned the film a score of 53 out of 100, based on 35 critics, indicating "mixed or average" reviews.

Film critic Roger Ebert praised the film's performances but criticized its story, writing that he did not believe the film works on its own without "reference to the theatrical version." David Rooney of Variety praised the performances of Rosario Dawson, Tracie Thoms, and Jesse L. Martin, but criticized the film's decision to enlist most of the show's original cast, writing that the choice raises questions as to why these people, "some of them clearly pushing 40", are still "floundering in artsy aimlessness."

=== Box office ===
Rent grossed $29.1 million in the United States and Canada, and $2.6 million in other territories, for a worldwide total of $31.7 million, against a budget of $40 million.

== See also ==
- List of Christmas films
