= James E. Muller =

American cardiologist

James E. Muller is an American cardiologist and medical device executive. He was a member of the faculty of Harvard Medical School for over 25 years, where he studied triggers of coronary artery plaque rupture and sudden cardiac death. He is believed to have coined the term “vulnerable plaque” to denote the plaques at high likelihood of rupture and causation of coronary thrombosis.

== Career ==
He co-founded International Physicians for the Prevention of Nuclear War. This organization was awarded the Nobel Peace Prize in 1985, a prize properly attributed to the organization alone rather than any individual members, including co-founders.

He is Founder, Chief Medical Officer, and chairman of the Board of InfraReDx, Inc. which manufactures a catheter-based near-infrared spectroscopy system used to identify cholesterol rich plaques in patients undergoing cardiac catheterization. This system was cleared by the U.S. Food and Drug Administration for use to identify lipid core in coronary plaques of interest.
