= Seasons of Love =

Song from the musical "Rent"

Song by Cast of Rent

from the album Rent (Original Broadway Cast Recording)
- Released: September 1996
- Genre: Show tune; soul; gospel
- Length: 2:52
- Songwriter: Jonathan Larson

"Seasons of Love", also known as "525,600 Minutes", is a song from the 1996 Broadway musical Rent, written and composed by Jonathan Larson. The song starts with an ostinato piano motif, which provides the harmonic framework for the cast to sing "Five hundred twenty-five thousand, six hundred minutes" (the number of minutes in a common year). The main instruments used throughout the song are piano, vocals, guitar, organ, bass and drums.

The song is performed by the entire cast in the musical and in the 2005 film adaptation. The lyrics ask what the proper way is to quantify the value of a year in human life, concluding in the chorus that the most effective means is to "measure in love". Since four of the lead characters either have HIV or AIDS, the song is often associated with World AIDS Day and AIDS awareness month.

== Songwriter ==
Jonathan Larson actually intended for "Seasons of Love" to be performed symbolically as a song at Angel's funeral. When Larson died the night before the preview opening of the show, the cast sang it at the beginning to pay their respects to him. It is performed at the beginning of the second act, referencing recent past events or the events to come. The song is heard twice throughout the second act (before "A Happy New Year" and the reprise is heard after "Take Me or Leave Me", before "Without You") before hearing it in its last incarnation as background to "I'll Cover You: Reprise" and Angel's eulogy.

== Stage productions ==
In the original Broadway production, the song is sung at the opening of the second act. The cast stands downstage in a straight line facing the audience. The entire cast performs the song, and the solos are normally performed by two cast members who play several minor roles each (namely Mr. and Mrs. Jefferson). "Seasons of Love" is performed in two parts, the first at the beginning of Act II with the reprise following a few numbers later, following "Take Me or Leave Me".

The song has been translated into multiple languages for the international productions of the musical ("Tiempos de amor" in Spanish, "Nur Liebe Bleibt" in German, "Sígræn ást" in Icelandic and "A szerelem évszakai" in Hungarian).

== Film adaptation ==
"Seasons of Love"

Single by Cast of Rent

from the album Rent: Original Motion Picture Soundtrack
- Released: August 2, 2005
- Studio: El Dorado Studios; Skywalker Sound
- Genre: Show tune; soul; gospel
- Length: 3:02
- Label: Warner Bros.
- Songwriter: Jonathan Larson
- Producer: Rob Cavallo

Rent soundtrack singles chronology
"Seasons of Love" (2005)	"Take Me or Leave Me" (2006)

In the 2005 film version of Rent, "Seasons of Love" and its reprise are performed. Only the eight principal characters perform the song, and the two solos are performed by Joanne (Tracie Thoms) and Tom Collins (Jesse L. Martin). "Seasons of Love" is first performed at the start of the film with the cast singing it on a theater stage. In the reprise the song plays as a backdrop to a documentary style film about New York life made by the character Mark. Selections from "Seasons of Love" were also used in several of the film's trailers and other promotional material.

=== Track listings ===
Digital download
No.	Title	Length
1.	"Seasons of Love"	3:02

Remixes digital EP
No.	Title	Length
1.	"Seasons of Love" (Gomi's Lair Radio Edit)	3:47
2.	"Seasons of Love" (Monkey Bars Remix Edit)	4:48
3.	"Seasons of Love" (L.E.X. Theatrical Club Mix Edit)	4:59
4.	"Seasons of Love" (Eddie Baez's "Payin' the Rent" Club Mix Edit)	4:57

Remixes CD maxi single
No.	Title	Length
1.	"Seasons of Love" (Gomi's Lair Club Mix)	8:22
2.	"Seasons of Love" (Monkey Bars Club Mix)	7:20
3.	"Seasons of Love" (L.E.X. Theatrical Club Mix)	5:11
4.	"Seasons of Love" (Eddie Baez's "Payin' the Rent" Club Mix)	10:13
5.	"Seasons of Love" (Gomi's Lair Radio Edit)	3:44
6.	"Seasons of Love" (Monkey Bars Remix Edit)	4:48
7.	"Seasons of Love" (L.E.X. Theatrical Club Mix Edit)	4:57
8.	"Seasons of Love" (Eddie Baez's "Payin' the Rent" Club Mix Edit)	4:59

=== Charts ===
Chart (2005–06)	Peak position
US Billboard Hot 100	33
US Dance Club Songs (Billboard)	4
US Dance Airplay (Billboard)	25
US Hot Dance Singles Sales (Billboard)	4

== Alternative versions ==
In addition to the 1996 Original Cast Recording (OCR) a number of different versions have been recorded. Along with the OCR soundtrack is an alternative version of Seasons of Love featuring Stevie Wonder who sings (and improvises upon) the part usually sung by the soloists and also plays harmonica.

Hong Kong singer Sandy Lam recorded a version of the song for her 1997 album Wonderful World.

A version of the song was recorded by The Broadway Kids on their 2001 album The Best of Broadway.

The Office (U.S.) characters surprised lead actor Steve Carell playing Michael Scott upon his departure on the show during "Michael's Last Dundies".

Rent star Idina Menzel covered the song for her 2019 Christmas album Christmas: A Season of Love.

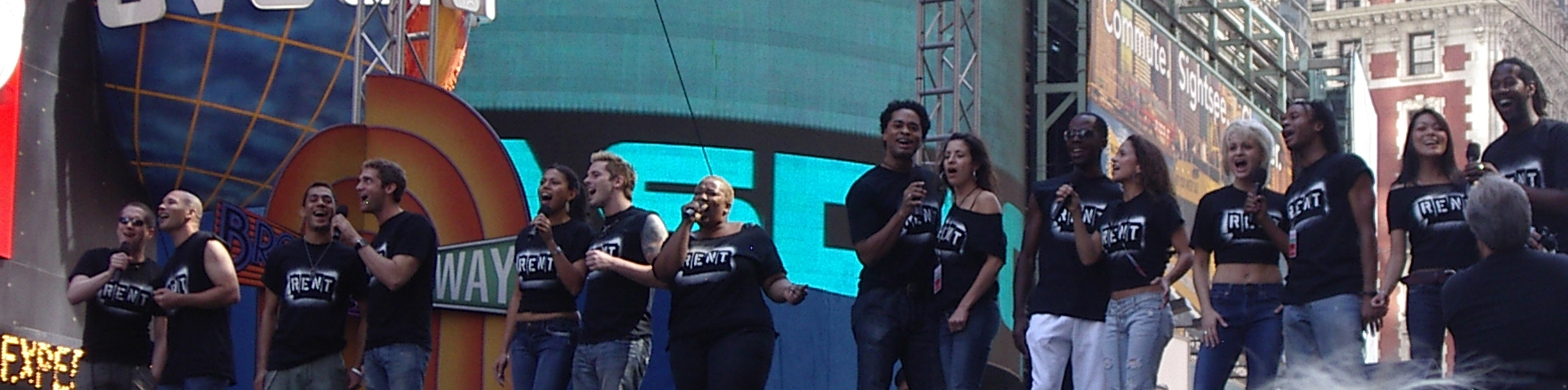
Cast of Rent performing "Seasons of Love" at Broadway on Broadway, 2005

In January 2021 a parody entitled "Seasons of Trump" was posted on YouTube by Randy Rainbow about the presidency of Donald Trump. As of February 27, 2021 this had received over 1.9M views.

The song appears in the 2026 film Primetime being covered by Skyler Gisondo’s character Dan Plum.

== Glee cast version ==
On October 10, 2013, the song was covered on the third episode of the fifth season of Glee, "The Quarterback", as a tribute to Cory Monteith and his character Finn Hudson. This version placed on a few record charts, published by Billboard.

Chart (2013)	Peak position
Canada (Hot Canadian Digital Songs)	60
US Bubbling Under Hot 100 (Billboard)	21
US Digital Song Sales (Billboard)	56
US Pop Digital Songs (Billboard)	23
