= Fredi Walker =

American actress

Fredi Walker-Browne
- Born: October 2, 1962 (age 62); St. Louis, Missouri, U.S.
- Occupation: Actress

Fredi Walker-Browne (née Walker) is an American actress.

== Early years ==
Walker was born on October 2, 1962, in St. Louis, Missouri. She was known as Frederica Walker when she attended Southwest High School. She decided to be an actress when she was 14 years old, and she performed regularly in the school's theatrical productions. She is an alumna of New York University. She moved to New York in 1981, working as a masseuse, set builder, usher, waitress, and wardrobe assistant while she sought opportunities to act professionally.

== Career ==
Walker's early professional acting included work in "lesser-known plays in smaller theaters" and performing in touring troupes of Cats, Les Miserables, and Once on This Island.

Her Broadway debut was the role of Joanne Jefferson, the high-class lawyer and lover of Maureen Johnson (Idina Menzel), in the original Broadway cast of Rent. At 33, Walker-Browne was the oldest of the eight principal cast members. The role garnered her an Obie and a Fanny Award. She also toured nationally with The Lion King as Rafiki.

In 2005, her role of Joanne in the film version of Rent was played by Tracie Thoms. Walker stated that she was not offered the film role due to her age. At her request, however, the producers cast an actress of African descent.

In 2012, she had a recurring guest spot on the Showtime series The Big C.

She is the founder and president of Big Spoon Productions, which produces and directs screenplays and teleplays. As of November 2015, Walker-Browne was a voice instructor at the Music and Art Academy in Matawan, New Jersey.

== Filmography ==
Year	Title	Role	Notes
1999	Law and Order	Valerie Tashe	Guest Star
2012	The Big C	Shay	Recurring character
2019	Rent: Live	Herself	
