= Wilson Jermaine Heredia =

American actor

- Born: December 2, 1971 (age 54); Brooklyn, New York City, U.S.
- Occupations: Actor; singer; dancer
- Years active: 1995–present

Wilson Jermaine Heredia (born December 2, 1971) is an American actor best known for his portrayal of Angel Dumott Schunard in the Broadway musical Rent, for which he won the Tony Award for Best Actor Featured in a Musical in 1996. The same year, he also won the Drama Desk Award for Outstanding Featured Actor in a Musical. Heredia also originated the role at London's Shaftesbury Theatre in the West End theatre district and in the 2005 film adaptation.

== Life and career ==
Heredia was born in Brooklyn, New York, the son of immigrants from the Dominican Republic – a seamstress mother and a building superintendent father. He has appeared in several films, including his portrayal of Cha-Cha, the drag queen, in 1999's Flawless, where he worked opposite former Rent castmate Daphne Rubin-Vega. The film also stars Robert De Niro and Philip Seymour Hoffman. Heredia also appeared in the Law & Order: Special Victims Unit episode "Nocturne" where he showed Jonathan how to play the entertainer.

Along with five other principal members of the original Broadway cast, Heredia appeared in the film release of Rent, directed by Chris Columbus. Heredia stated that he enjoys the transformational process involved in assuming the persona of the cross-dressing Angel, but dislikes having makeup on his face and found the high heels he had to wear as part of his costume extremely painful. Heredia says he enjoyed the blackly comedic parody of Rent in the film Team America: World Police, which features a fictional Broadway musical called Lease. He enjoys filming because the close up shots allow him to "cut loose" and go wild a lot more than the stage allows.

On January 9, 2006, he presented an award at the Critics' Choice Awards with Rosario Dawson, Taye Diggs, and Tracie Thoms, his costars from the Rent motion picture. He appeared along with Dawson and Thoms on the 2007 film Descent, playing the character of Diego.

Heredia has also guest starred on Medium and Without a Trace, and in 2009 he filmed a pilot called Three Chris's.

He made his return to Broadway in La Cage aux Folles on February 15, 2011, in the role of Jacob (replacing Robin de Jesús). He starred alongside Harvey Fierstein (who won a Tony Award for writing the Book of the musical) as Albin/Zaza and Broadway veteran Christopher Sieber as Georges.

As of 2013, Heredia lives in the San Francisco Bay Area. He starred in San Francisco Playhouse's production of Camelot, as Sir Lancelot, and Berkeley Playhouse's production of A Little Princess as Pasko.

He made an appearance in the 2021 film Tick, Tick ...BOOM!, which was based on the musical of the same name by Rent creator Jonathan Larson.

In 2022, Heredia was cast as the lead in Syracuse Stage's world premiere of the musical How to Dance in Ohio, based on the award winning documentary of the same name by Alexandra Shiva.

In August 2023, Heredia lent his voice to the Broadway Podcast Network audio drama Around the Sun, starring as "Kyle" in three episodes of Season 3: Pinecones. The project paired him with yet another "Angel" from Jonathan Larson's Rent: Jai Rodriguez.
