= Tracie Thoms =

American actress

- Thoms in 2026
- Born: Baltimore, Maryland, US
- Education: Howard University (BFA); Juilliard School (GrDip)
- Occupations: Actress; singer
- Years active: 1997–present

Tracie Thoms is an American actress and singer. She is known for her film roles in Rent and The Devil Wears Prada, her main cast role in the streaming series Truth Be Told, and her long running recurring role in the television series 9-1-1. She also portrayed Charlotte in the Broadway revival of Falsettos.

== Early life and education ==
Thoms was born and raised in Baltimore, Maryland, daughter of Donald H. Thoms, a VP of Programming at PBS and television director, and Mariana Davis. She has a younger brother, Austin. She started studying acting at age ten and later on attended the Baltimore School for the Arts.

She earned her Bachelor of Fine Arts degree from Howard University in 1997. She then attended the Juilliard School's Drama Division as a member of Group 30 (1997–2001), which also included actors Lee Pace and Anthony Mackie.

== Career ==
Thoms is known for her role as Mahandra McGinty in the comedy/drama television series Wonderfalls. She also played the part of Sasha in the American version of the television series As If, which was cancelled after three episodes. In 2005, Thoms was added to the cast of the CBS crime drama Cold Case, as homicide detective Kat Miller. She has also made guest appearances on Law & Order and The Shield.

Thoms has appeared in several movies, most notably in the film adaptation of the Broadway musical Rent in which she plays Joanne Jefferson, lawyer and lover of Maureen Johnson (Idina Menzel). This reflected the request of Fredi Walker, who played Joanne in the original Broadway production of Rent, to the filmmakers that Joanne still be depicted as Black even though Walker herself, at 43, was too old to reprise the part.

She was featured in the 2002 Comedy Central film Porn 'n Chicken and the 2004 films Brother to Brother and The Warrior Class. Thoms appeared in the 2006 film version of The Devil Wears Prada as Lily. Thoms filmed the City Lights Pictures movie Descent along with Rent co-stars Wilson Jermaine Heredia and Rosario Dawson and was set to begin filming Jimmie with co-stars Vanessa Williams and Brian McKnight. She appeared in Quentin Tarantino's Death Proof, alongside Zoë Bell, Rosario Dawson and Mary Elizabeth Winstead.

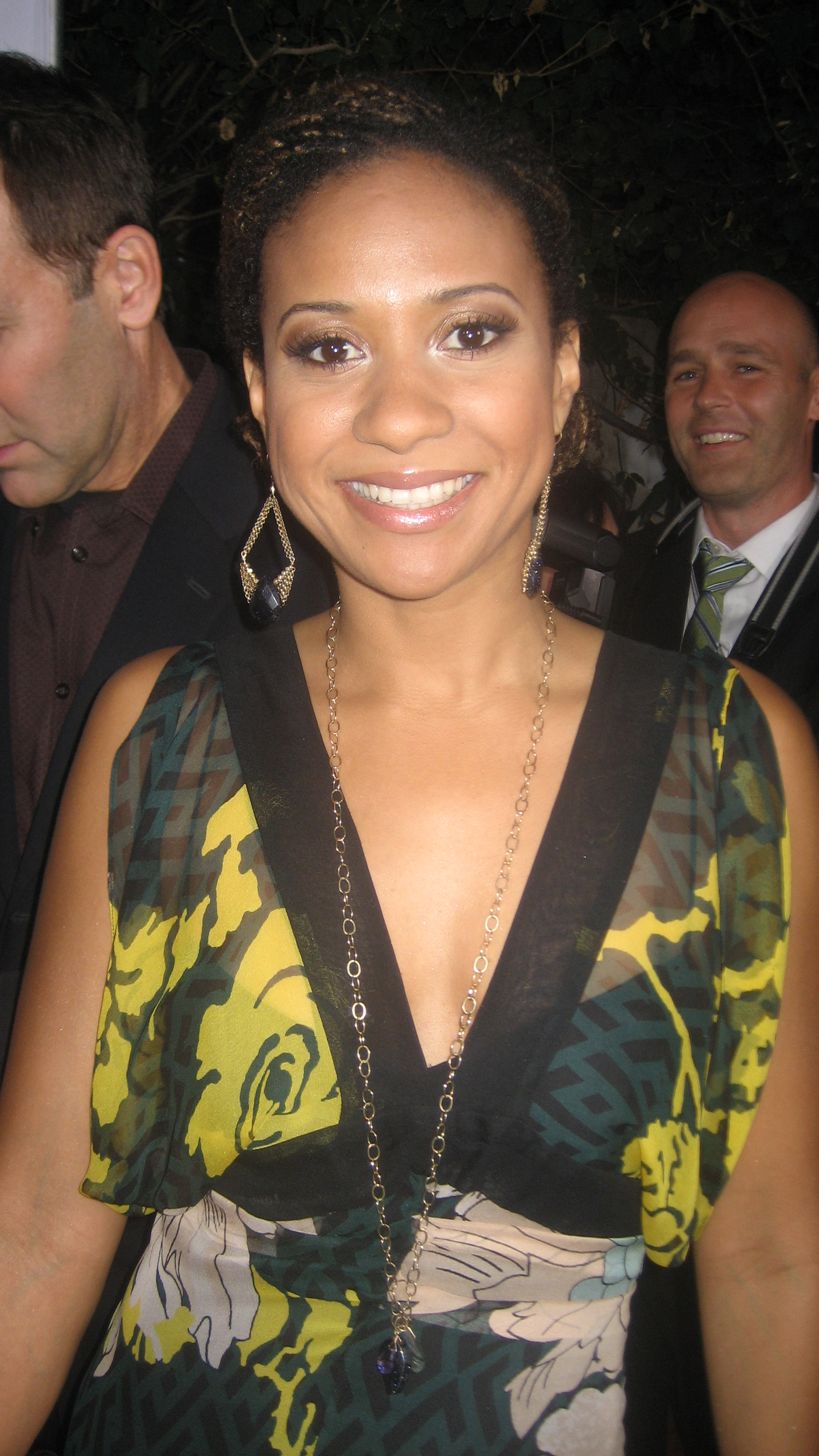
Thoms in 2008

Thoms made her Broadway debut in Regina Taylor's Drowning Crow. She has also appeared in several off-Broadway and regional productions, including Up Against the Wind (New York Theatre Workshop), The Oedipus Plays (The Shakespeare Theater), A Raisin in the Sun (Baltimore CenterStage), Joe Turner's Come and Gone (Missouri Rep), The Exonerated (Off Broadway's The Culture Project), and The Antigone Project (The Women's Project). On July 18, 2008, she joined the final cast of Rent starting July 26, 2008, reprising the character of Joanne, replacing Merle Dandridge. The final performance was made into a DVD: Rent: Filmed Live on Broadway.

Thoms reprised her role as Joanne for another production of Rent, directed by Neil Patrick Harris, at the Hollywood Bowl from August 6–8, 2010.

In the fall of 2010 she appeared in the concert revue For The Record: Quentin Tarantino in Los Angeles, presented by ROCKLA for Show at Barre. It ran from August 12, 2010, to October 30, 2010, and also starred Jenna Leigh Green, Autumn Reeser, Ty Taylor, and Audra Mae. From November 2010 through January 2011, Thoms starred in Show at Barre's For The Record: John Hughes, alongside Barrett Foa, Von Smith and Ty Taylor. In 2011 she appeared at Show at Barre in the revue For the Record: Baz Luhrmann, from February 12, 2011, to June 30, 2011, with Jenna Leigh Green, Arielle Jacobs, Tinuke Oyefule and Kate Reinders.

She played Etta, Diana Prince's personal assistant, in NBC's Wonder Woman pilot.

Thoms had a role in the 2014 version of Annie, playing Annie's "fake mother", a character based on Lily St. Regis in the original musical.

In 2016, she appeared in the Broadway revival of Falsettos as Dr. Charlotte.

Since 2018, Thoms has played the recurring role of Karen Wilson in the Los Angeles first responders drama 9-1-1. She reprised the role of Lily in the 2026 film The Devil Wears Prada 2.

== Filmography ==
=== Film ===
Year	Title	Role	Notes
2004	Brother to Brother	Mother	
2005	Everyone's Depressed	Crystal	Short
2005	Rent	Joanne Jefferson	
2006	The Devil Wears Prada	Lily	
2007	The Warrior Class	Thelma Rosbach	Video
2007	Descent	Denise	
2007	Death Proof	Kim Mathis	
2007	Sex and Breakfast	Sarah, Female Tenant	
2009	Peter and Vandy	Marissa	
2010	I Will Follow	Tiffany	
2010	RENT at the Hollywood Bowl	Joanne	Video
2012	Safe House	CIA Analyst	
2012	Meeting Evil	Latisha Rogers	
2012	Looper	Beatrix, The Waitress	
2013	Raze	Teresa	
2013	McCanick	Sister Alice	
2013	A Different Tree	Jada	Short
2014	Annie	Annie's "Mom"	
2015	Fun Size Horror: Volume One	Karen	
2015	Fun Size Horror: Volume Two	Tommy	
2016	Equity	Melanie	
2016	The Drowning	Angela	
2016	No Touching	Blair	Short
2016	Injection	Sarah Wenscombe	Short
2016	Divorce: The Greatest Hits	Helen	Short
2016	The Watcher	Amanda	
2016	A Christmas in New York	Katherine Taylor	
2017	The Concessionaires Must Die!	Church Lady	
2018	Are We Good Parents?	Lauren	Short
2018	Top Ramen	Opal	Short
2018	The Basement	Lauren	
2018	Pipe	Bliss	Short
2019	Emmett	Sandra	
2019	Straight Up	Dr. Larson	
2020	The California No	Samantha	
2020	Boss Bitch Fight Challenge	Tracie	Short
2020	aTypical Wednesday	Jason's Mom	
2020	BTSD	Lia Lasley	Short
2021	Yes Day	Billie/Concert Coordinator	
2021	Bolivar	Susan Woods	
2022	Back to Lyla	Dr. Nolan	
2022	Elevate	Tiffany	Short
2022	Paulie Go!	Cheryl	
2022	Jerry & Marge Go Large	Maya	
2022	Blood Relatives	Ms. Shelling	
2026	The Devil Wears Prada 2	Lily	
2026	Misty Green	Rhonda	

=== Television ===
Year	Title	Role	Notes
2002	As If	Sasha	Main cast: 7 episodes
2002	Porn 'n Chicken	Andrea	TV movie
2002	America's Most Terrible Things	Terri	TV movie
2003	The Shield	Bonnie	Episode: "Dominoes Falling"
2004	Wonderfalls	Mahandra McGinty	Main cast: 11 episodes
2005	Law & Order	Linda Ziman	Episode: "Mammon"
2005	Independent Lens	Mom On Subway	Episode: "Brother to Brother"
2005–2010	Cold Case	Kat Miller	Main cast: 96 episodes (seasons 3–7)
2008	This Can't Be My Life	Rachel Brooks	Episode: "The Pink Pages"
2008	Rent: Filmed Live on Broadway	Joanne Jefferson	TV movie
2009	Private Practice	Colette	Episode: "Pushing the Limits"
2010	Human Target	Michelle	Episode: "Dead Head"
2011	Suits	Becky	Episode: "Tricks of the Trade"
2011	Harry's Law	A.D.A. Katherine Kepler	Recurring cast: 4 episodes
2011	Wonder Woman	Etta Candy	Episode: "Pilot"
2011	Bandwagon: The Series	Tracie Thoms	Main cast: 11 episodes
2012	My America	Herself	Episode: "The Author's America"
2013	Emily Owens M.D.	Natalia Gorgia	Episode: "Emily and... The Teapot"
2013	The Good Wife	Judy Bishop	Episode: "Runnin' with the Devil"
2013	Person of Interest	Monica Jacobs	Episode: "Trojan Horse"
2014	Veep	Alicia Bryce	Episode: "Alicia"
2014	Songbyrd	Clara Frye	Episode: “Pilot”
2014	Catfish: The TV Show	Herself	Episode: “Tracie & Sammie”
2015–2016	He's with Me	Naomi	Recurring cast: 3 episodes (season 2)
2016	Send Me: An Original Web Series	Gwen	Main cast: 6 episodes
2016	The Real MVP: The Wanda Durant Story	Demetria	TV movie
2016	Living with Models	Hatch Girl	Recurring cast: season 3
2016	The Mindy Project	Kathy	Episode: "My Kid Stays in the Picture"
2016	BrainDead	Ashley Cook	Episode: "Taking on Water: How Leaks in D.C. Are Discovered and Patched"
2016–2018	Love	Susan Cheryl	Recurring cast: 10 episodes
2017	American Gods	Buffer	Episode: "Lemon Scented You"
2017	Live from Lincoln Center	Dr. Charlotte	Episode: "Falsettos"
2017	Criminal Minds	Monica Walker	Episode: "Unforgettable" & "Wheels Up"
2017	Wisdom of the Crowd	Special Agent Lydia Driscoll	Episode: "Denial of Service"
2017–2018	Gone	FBI Agent Maya Kennedy	Main cast: 9 episodes
2018	UnREAL	Fiona Berlin	Recurring cast: 10 episodes (seasons 3-4)
2018	The First	Nancy	Recurring cast: 4 episodes
2018	Grey's Anatomy	Roberta Gibbs	Episode: "Flowers Grow Out of My Grave"
2018–present	9-1-1	Karen Wilson	Recurring cast: 65 episodes
2019	Abby's	Emily	Episode: "Book Club"
2019	The Good Doctor	Patricia Reynolds	Episode: "Claire"
2019	The Affair	Joyce	Episode #5.8
2019	Mad About You	Dean Calhoun	Episode: "Restraining Orders and Puppies"
2019–2023	Truth Be Told	Desireé Scoville	Main cast: 25 episodes
2020	Curb Your Enthusiasm	Female Traveler	Episode: "Elizabeth, Margaret and Larry"
2020	Lincoln Rhyme: Hunt for the Bone Collector	FBI Agent Cutter	Episodes: "Game On" & "Open Warfare"
2020	Blindspot	FBI Director Arla Grigoryan	Episodes: "Love You to Bits and Bytes" & "Iunne Ennui"
2020	(home)Schooled	Roberta	TV movie
2020	NCIS: Los Angeles	Lt. Col. Lucilla Catro	Episode: "War Crimes"
2020–2024	Station 19	Dr. Diane Lewis	Special guest cast: 9 episodes (season 3-7)
2021	Behind the Monsters	Herself	Main cast: 6 episodes
2021	Sidetracked	Leigh	Main cast: 10 episodes
2021–2022	Family Guy	Pouncy / Beautiful Woman (voice)	Episode: "Family Cat" & "The Lois Quagmire"
2022–2024	The Legend of Vox Machina	The Everlight (voice)	Episode: "A Silver Tongue" & "Hell to Pay"
2022	Love, Victor	Naomi	Episode: "It's You"
2022	Tab Time	Frieda Fraidy Cat	Episode: "When We Feel Afraid"
2022	Queen Sugar	Camille	Episode: "Never to Be the Same" & "Whisper to Us"
2022	Central Park	Morgan Freewoman (voice)	Episode: "The Puffs Go Poof"
2022	Beyond the Dark	Bliss	Episode: "Pipe"
2024	Celebrity Family Feud	Herself (contestant)	Episode: "Fantasy Sweets vs Golden Five and 9-1-1 vs Jury Duty"
2025	Good American Family	Dr. Rani Burch	Episode: "Ghosts Everywhere"

=== Documentary ===
Year	Title
2009	Good Hair

=== Radio ===
Year	Title	Role
2021	Marvel's Wastelanders: Hawkeye	Kate Bishop

=== Theatre ===
Year	Title	Role	Notes
1997	Hair	Sheila	
2003	The Exonerated	Georgia Hayes	
2004	Drowning Crow	Mary Bow	
2008	Rent	Joanne Jefferson	Broadway; Replacement
2010	Rent	Joanne Jefferson	Hollywood Bowl
2010	Pippin	The Leading Player	
2011–2012	Stick Fly	Taylor Bradley Scott	
2014	Lost Lake	Veronica	
2016–2017	Falsettos	Dr. Charlotte	Broadway revival
2019	Working	Fatou Sillah	Encores!
2026–2027	Falsettos	Dr. Charlotte	Carnegie Hall
2027	Falsettos	Dr. Charlotte	London Palladium

== Awards ==
In 2016, Thoms was Emmy nominated in the Outstanding Actress in a Short Form Comedy or Drama Series category for Send Me: An Original Web Series which was released on BET.com.
