= Miranda Crispin =

American actress

Miranda Crispin is an American musical theatre performer, director, and teacher based in Paris, France.

== Biography ==
Crispin is the co-founder of and serves as the Artistic Director for the American Musical Theatre Live theatre company in Paris, France.

She performed in the Paris premieres of Jason Robert Brown's The Last Five Years (Cathy) and Songs for a New World, and in Next Thing You Know (Lisa) by Joshua Salzman and Ryan Cunningham.

She served as the vocal director for the Paris premiere of the Pasek and Paul musical, Edges, and for the new French musical Sleepin’ Bee, directed by Franck Harscouët. Crispin teaches musical theatre master classes at universities and theatres throughout the USA, in France and the UK.
