= Hanukkah (disambiguation) =

Hanukkah is a Jewish holiday.

Hanukkah and its spelling variations may also refer to:

== Music ==
- "The Chanukah Song" or "Chanuka", a 1995 song by Adam Sandler
- Chanukah Suite, a chorale composition by Jason Robert Brown
- "Oh Chanukah", a traditional Hanukkah song

== Places ==
- Al Hanakah

== Other uses ==
- "Chanukah" (Rugrats), an episode of Rugrats
- Hanukkah ben Obadiah, a ruler from the mid- to late ninth century CE
- Hanukkah (film), a 2019 American independent slasher film

== People with the surname ==
- Anna Hanika (1903–1988), Austrian accounts clerk and activist
- D. V. Chanaka (born 1987), Sri Lankan politician
- Iris Hanika (born 1962), German writer
- Karel Hanika (born 1996), motorcycle racer

== People with the given name ==
- Chanaka Amaratunga (1958–1996), founder of the Liberal Party of Sri Lanka
- Chanaka Devinda (born 1997), Sri Lankan cricketer
- Chanaka Komasaru (born 1983), Sri Lankan cricketer
- Chanaka Ruwansiri (born 1989), Sri Lankan cricketer
- Chanaka Welegedara (born 1981), Sri Lankan cricketer
- Chanaka Wijesinghe (born 1982), Sri Lankan cricketer
- Chanuka Bandara (cricketer, born 1998), Sri Lankan cricketer

== See also ==
- Hanukkah brisket
- Hanukkah bush, a tree in honor of Hanukkah resembling a Christmas tree
- Hanukkah donuts
- Hanukkah Eve windstorm of 2006, a storm on the Pacific coast
- Hanukkah film, film in which the main emphasis is on Hanukkah
- Hanukkah gelt, chocolate coins given to children on Hanukkah
- Hanukkah stamp, holiday postage stamps commemorating Hanukkah
