= Next Thing You Know =

American musical

- CAP21 production poster
- Music: Joshua Salzman
- Lyrics: Ryan Cunningham
- Productions: 2011 Off-Broadway: 2019 Playbill Audio Musical; 2020 The Access Theatre New York City

Next Thing You Know is an American musical written by Joshua Salzman and Ryan Cunningham. The show follows four New Yorkers in their late twenties.

== Development ==
Salzman and Cunnigham first met in New York University's graduate program in musical theater writing, where they began writing the songs that became their first musical I Love You Because.

Developed with director John Simpkins, Next Thing You Know was first presented as a song cycle at New York University

The show entered development with both Encore Theatre Company in the States as part of their Musicals in Development Initiative and Sell A Door Theatre Company in the UK.

== Productions ==
The show was put on in June 2011 at CAP21. It was directed by Terry Berliner, with scenic design by Andy Yanni, costume design by Julia Broer, lighting design by Brian Tovar, audio design by John Emmett O'Brien, and musically directed by Kurt Crowley. The show starred Lauren Molina (Waverly), Adam Kantor (Darren), Heath Calvert (Luke), and Lauren Blackman (Lisa).

The cast album was recorded with Lauren Blackman (Lisa), Colin Hanlon (Darren), Jay Armstrong Johnson (Luke), and Patti Murin (Waverly).

The show premiered in Paris, France in 2015 by American Musical Theatre Live staged by Tolgay Pekin featuring Lauren Berkman and Marion Préïté (Waverly), Frédéric Brodard and Vinicius Timmerman (Darren), Quentin Bruno (Luke) and Miranda Crispin (Lisa) with musical direction by Mathieu Becquerelle. The show continued its Paris run throughout 2016. The show was put on again in February 2020 at The Access Theatre in New York City. It was directed by Lola Lopez Guardone, with scenic design and produced by Franco Castronuovo. The show starred Maria Agostina Becco (Waverly), Emiliano Cuesta (Darren), Juan Martín Giménez (Luke), and Samantha Blinn (Lisa).

== Plot overview ==
In the CAP21 production, the story follows Waverly, who lives in Manhattan and begins with her getting a promotion from the law firm she works at, going from temp to full-time while also bar tending at night. A result of this is the loss of her acting career, and the thought of losing it is hard for her to deal with. On top of that, her playwright boyfriend Darren does not understand why it is so hard. His reaction causes their breakup, and she begins a fling with the casanova Luke, who works in sales where Darren temps.

== Characters ==
- Waverly - A woman in her late 20s. Actress who tends bar to make ends meet. Has struggled to build a career for herself as a performer since arriving in the city. Now has a non-performing day-job she loves, and a man she adores – but when they both look for her to move to the next level, it scares her to death. (Belter up to F5)
- Lisa - A woman in her late 20s. Candid musician who performs at their local dive bar and Waverly's best friend. Once dated Darren before coming out, and is now struggling to find the right woman. Faces the difficult decision as to whether or not she should move away from the city, start a new chapter, and leave her New York life behind. (Mezzo-Soprano).
- Darren - A man in his late 20s. Brooding and talented yet charming writer who dreams of settling down, while still pursuing his artistic endeavors. Thoughtful and loving guy, but at times very self-involved and distracted. Struggles to balance the life he wants with the woman he loves. (Baritone with falsetto)
- Luke - A man in his late 20s. Charismatic playboy who has everything he could ever want, but has a lot of growing up to do. A man-child, he has no intention of settling down – until a woman sneaks into his heart, and he's forced to decide between the dreams of a young cad and the life of a man. (Tenor up to C#)

== Musical Numbers ==
- Prelude
- Little Bar On Sullivan Street - Waverly, Darren, Luke, Lisa
- Stay - Waverly, Lisa
- Morning After Omelet - Luke
- As Good As I Get - Darren
- We're Gonna Go Out - Darren, Waverly, Lisa, Luke
- The Way to Get a Girl - Darren, Luke
- Manhattan Bridge - Lisa
- How 'Bout You - Darren, Waverly
- Don't Say Another Word - Waverly
- We're Gonna Go Out (Reprise) - Darren
- Hungover - Darren, Waverly, Luke, Lisa
- And I Breathe - Luke
- If She Were Coming Home - Darren
- I Wish There Were a Reason - Waverly, Darren
- You Can't Be Everything You Want - Lisa
- Next Thing You Know - Waverly, Lisa
- All That I Want Is You - Darren, Waverly
- Next Thing You Know Finale - Luke, Lisa, Darren, Waverly
- Home Calls - Lisa

== Reception ==
Catherine Rampell of the New York Times said the cast was "amiable and understated, ideal for CAP21’s black box rigged as an intimate theater in the round." She also noted the great performance of Kantor, but said the blocking was at time didactic and some of the songs were forced or forgettable. She positively concludes "the show still achieves a nearly effortless resonance — especially with any 20-something who has recently moved to the Big Pond that is the Big Apple."
