= Wearing Someone Else's Clothes =

Studio album by Jason Robert Brown
- Released: 28 June 2005
- Recorded: October 22, 1997–August 2004
- Genres: Rock, musical theatre, gospel, funk, jazz
- Length: 57:53
- Label: Sh-K-Boom / Razor & Tie
- Producer: Jeffrey Lesser

Jason Robert Brown chronology
The Last Five Years (2002)	Wearing Someone Else's Clothes (2005)

Professional ratings
Review scores
Source	Rating
Allmusic	3.5/5 stars

Wearing Someone Else's Clothes is a solo album by musical theater composer Jason Robert Brown. It was released by Sh-K-Boom Records on June 28, 2005 to generally positive critical reception. Amazon.com named it as one of its ten Editors' Picks in Broadway and Vocal Albums for 2005.

The album contains songs written by Brown between 1996 and 2004, many of which he wrote independent of any musical. Before the release of the album, some of these songs were played at his live concert performances. Similarly to his other works such as Songs for a New World, the album covers a diverse blend of musical genres including rock, gospel, funk, and jazz. Brown sings his own music throughout the album; he is joined by Lillias White on "Coming Together" and a chorus (featuring a number of Broadway performers) on several of the songs. Many instrumental parts are performed by his band, the Caucasian Rhythm Kings. In addition to writing and singing, Brown also orchestrated, arranged, and played piano on ten of the album's eleven songs.

== Previously unreleased songs ==
The album contains a few songs which had not previously been released commercially, but which nevertheless were known by Brown's fans. "Someone To Fall Back On" was originally recorded on The Inaudible Jason Robert Brown, an album that Brown distributed only to family and friends. The song also appeared in some of Brown's live performances. The song eventually made its way into the film Bandslam, directed by Todd Graff. This slightly faster rock-pop version was sung by Aly Michalka.

"I Could Be In Love With Someone Like You" was originally a part of the musical The Last Five Years, but it was replaced with the similar song "Shiksa Goddess" after the musical's first run, because a lawsuit forced Brown to significantly change the female character described in the song.

== Track listing ==
1. "Someone Else's Clothes" – 5:31
2. "Long Long Road" – 5:32
3. "Someone To Fall Back On" – 4:43
4. "Getting Out" – 4:55
5. "Over" – 6:09
6. "Music Of Heaven" – 5:52
7. "Nothing In Common" – 4:46
8. "I Could Be In Love With Someone Like You" – 3:46
9. "I'm In Bizness" – 7:30
10. "Coming Together" – 6:47
11. "Grow Old With Me" – 2:22
