= American Musical Theatre Live =

American Musical Theatre Live is a musical theatre organization based in Paris, France.

== Background ==
American Musical Theatre Live (AMT Live) is a non-profit association based in Paris, France that promotes and performs contemporary musical theatre.

Founded by Miranda Crispin and John Florencio, the organization features an international troupe of artists showcasing contemporary musical theatre productions and also offers professional musical theatre training programs.

AMT Live launched Paris’ first professional Off-Broadway style seasons with critically acclaimed French premiere productions of Pasek and Paul’s Edges, Jason Robert Brown's The Last Five Years and Songs for a New World, and Salzman and Ryan's Next Thing You Know.

The Studio AMT Live offers training workshops led by professionals from Paris, Broadway and the West End such as Adam Kantor and John Bucchino.

As part of its community outreach, AMT Live hosts a monthly musical theatre open mic. In 2016, AMT Live was named as the best theatre group in the Best of Paris awards.
