= John Florencio =

- Born: Manila, Philippines
- Genres: Classical
- Instrument: Piano
- Education: San Francisco Conservatory of Music (BMus)

John Florencio is a Filipino-American classical pianist.

== Early life and education ==
Born in Manila, Florencio studied classical piano at the University of Santo Tomas during his high school years. He graduated from the San Francisco Conservatory of Music with a degree in piano performance.

== Career ==
Florencio is the co-founder of the San Francisco Academy for the Performing Arts.

Florencio lives in Paris, France, and was part of the founding faculty of American Musical Theatre Live. He was the music director for the 2013 Paris premieres of the musicals Edges and The Last Five Years. In 2016, he was the pianist in London - Paris - Roam !, a one-woman musical show by Sarah Tullamore, at the Paris Fringe and Edinburgh Festival Fringe.
