= Hanika =

Hanika is a surname. Notable people with the surname include:

- Anna Hanika (1903–1988), Austrian resistance activist
- Iris Hanika (born 1962), German writer
- Karel Hanika (born 1996), Czech motorcycle racer
- Sylvia Hanika (born 1959), German tennis player

== See also ==
- Hanukkah
