= Quentin Bruno =

French singer

Quentin Bruno is a singer, dancer and actor from Paris, France. He was a candidate on The Voice: la plus belle voix as part of Team Mika.

== Biography ==
Bruno was a candidate on The Voice: la plus belle voix on the 4th season of the French version of the reality television singing competition The Voice.

Following the blind audition with his rendition of Wonderwall, for which he accompanied himself on the piano, Bruno was selected to be on the team of the Lebanese-born British singer and songwriter Mika He was eliminated during the battle rounds which featured French pop star Julien Doré as the guest coach.

He played role of Luke in the 2015 Paris premiere of the American Musical Theatre Live production of the Salzman and Cunningham musical Next Thing You Know. He was the choreographer for the premiere of the French musical Hashtags written by Alyssa Landry and Thierry Boulanger.

Bruno adapted Eric Chantelauze's theatrical piece C-o-n-t-a-c-t for English. Exploring themes of mental health and anxiety, an immersive, outdoor production will commence in August 2020 in London.
