= Sh-K-Boom Records =

American independent record label

- Founded: 2000
- Founder: Kurt Deutsch, Sherie Rene Scott
- Distributor: Warner Music Group
- Genre: Musical theatre, pop rock
- Country of origin: U.S.
- Location: New York City
- Official website: www.sh-k-boom.com

Sh-K-Boom Records is an independent record label and producer of recorded and live entertainment, which was founded in 2000 by Kurt Deutsch and Sherie Rene Scott with the mission of bridging the gap between pop music and theater. In 2004 Sh-K-Boom created their second imprint, Ghostlight Records, dedicated to the preservation of traditional musical theater, spurred by the popular release of their first-ever show cast recording, Jason Robert Brown's The Last Five Years. Together the two labels have over 200 albums in their catalogues. The company has also produced over 50 live concerts as part of their Sh-K-Boom Room Concert Series, and are currently developing new and innovative projects for the stage and screen.

Sh-K-Boom and Ghostlight Records are twelve-time Grammy Award nominees and four-time Grammy winners in the Best Musical Theater Album category for In the Heights, The Book of Mormon and Beautiful: The Carole King Musical. Ghostlight's Book of Mormon album was the first Broadway cast recording to break into the Billboard Top 10 since the original 1969 release of Hair, taking its place as the biggest-selling digital cast recording of all time. The label's Original Broadway Cast Album for In the Heights also debuted at #1 on the Billboard Top Cast Albums chart and arrived on the Billboard 200 at #82.

In June 2017, Sh-K-Boom entered a joint venture with Warner Music Group's Arts Music division.

Sh-K-Boom and Ghostlight Records have produced and released the debut solo albums of Broadway stars such as Adam Pascal, Sherie Rene Scott, Patti LuPone, Sutton Foster, Kelli O'Hara, Alice Ripley, Melissa Errico, Billy Porter, Ben Vereen, Daphne Rubin-Vega, Judy Kuhn, Christine Ebersole, Julia Murney, Ashley Brown, Linda Lavin, Lea Delaria, Anastasia Barzee, and Klea Blackhurst.

== Albums ==
2000–2004

- Adam Pascal – Model Prisoner
- Sherie Rene Scott – Men I've Had
- Alice Ripley – Everything's Fine
- The Last Five Years
- Debbie Does Dallas: The Musical
- Amour
- Great Joy: A Gospel Christmas
- A Very Merry Unauthorized Children's Scientology Pageant
- Adam Pascal – Civilian
- Christine Ebersole – In Your Dreams
- The New Moon

2005

- Hair – The Actors’ Fund of America Benefit Recording
- Little Women
- Dirty Rotten Scoundrels
- Altar Boyz
- The 25th Annual Putnam County Spelling Bee – Original Broadway Cast Recording
- Bright Lights, Big City
- Jason Robert Brown – Wearing Someone Else’s Clothes
- Billy Porter – Live At the Corner of Broadway + Soul
- The Immigrant: A New American Musical

2006

- The Great American Trailer Park Musical
- See What I Wanna See
- Songs from an Unmade Bed
- Kevin Cahoon – Doll
- Patti LuPone – The Lady With The Torch
- Julia Murney – I'm Not Waiting
- The Drowsy Chaperone – Original Broadway Cast Recording
- George M. Cohan Tonight
- title of show
- Bernarda Alba
- Klea Blackhurst – Autumn in New York: Vernon Duke’s Broadway
- Daphne Rubin-Vega – Redemption Songs
- Irving Berlin’s White Christmas
- The Fantasticks
- Jacques Brel is Alive and Well and Living in Paris

2007

- Orpheus & Euridice
- Happy End
- The Bubbly Black Girl Sheds Her Chameleon Skin
- Martin Short – Fame Becomes Me
- High Fidelity
- The Coast of Utopia
- Legally Blonde: The Musical
- Judy Kuhn – Serious Playground: The Songs of Laura Nyro
- LoveMusik

2008

- Gone Missing – The Civilians
- Kelli O'Hara – Wonder in the World
- David Yazbek – Evil Monkey Man
- Make me a Song: The Music of William Finn (2-disc)
- Christine Ebersole & Billy Stritch – Sunday in New York
- In the Heights Original Broadway Cast Recording (2-disc)
- Passing Strange Original Broadway Cast Recording
- Little Fish World Premiere Recording
- Bailey Hanks – So Much Better (Single)
- Toby Lightman – Waiting (Single)
- Lea DeLaria – The Live Smoke Sessions
- Frankenstein - A New Musical – Original Cast Recording
- Orfeh – What Do You Want From Me
- 13 – Original Broadway Cast Recording
- Patti LuPone – Les Mouches

2009

- Sutton Foster – Wish
- Next to Normal – Original Broadway Cast Recording
- Hair – 2009 Broadway Revival Cast Recording
- Our Time Theatre Company – Listen
- Pinkilicious – The Musical
- Vanities, A New Musical – Original Cast Recording

2010

- Sam Tsui & Kurt Hugo Schneider – The Covers
- Everyday Rapture – Original Cast Recording
- Bloody Bloody Andrew Jackson – Original Cast Recording
- Things To Ruin: The Songs of Joe Iconis – Original Cast Recording

2011

- Women On The Verge Of A Nervous Breakdown – Original Broadway Cast Recording
- Catch Me If You Can – Original Broadway Cast Recording
- Sister Act – London Cast Recording (American release)
- The Book of Mormon – Original Broadway Cast Recording
- Elf – Original Broadway Cast Recording
- Anything Goes – 2011 Broadway Cast Recording
- Godspell – 2011 Broadway Cast Recording
- Silence! The Musical – Original Cast Recording
- Melissa Errico – Legrand Affair
- Anastasia Barzee – The Dimming of the Day
- Footloose – Original Broadway Cast Recording (2011 Re-Release)
- A Little Princess – Premiere Cast Recording

2012

- Newsies – Original Cast Recording
- John & Jen – Original Cast Recording (Re-release)
- Bring It On: The Musical – Music Sampler
- Queen of the Mist – Original Cast Recording
- Calvin Berger – Original Cast Recording
- 35MM – A Musical Exhibition – Original Cast Recording
- Carrie – Premiere Cast Recording
- Pipe Dream – Live Encores! Cast Recording
- Bring It On: The Musical – Original Broadway Cast Recording
- Leap of Faith – Original Broadway Cast Recording
- Sandy Stewart & Bill Charlap – Something to Remember
- Now. Here. This. – Original Cast Recording
- 13 – Original West End Cast Recording

2013

- Fancy Nancy the Musical – Original Off-Broadway Cast Recording
- The Joe Iconis Rock and Roll Jamboree
- Dogfight – Original Cast Recording
- Rodgers + Hammerstein's Cinderella – Original Broadway Cast Recording
- Giant – Original Cast Recording
- Pippin – New Broadway Cast Recording
- Hands on a Hardbody – Original Broadway Cast Recording
- Marry Me a Little – New Off-Broadway Cast Recording
- The Last Five Years – New Off-Broadway Cast Recording
- Natasha, Pierre & The Great Comet of 1812 – Original Cast Recording

2014

- Murder for Two – Original Cast Recording
- A Gentleman's Guide to Love and Murder – Original Broadway Cast Recording
- The Bridges of Madison County – Original Broadway Cast Recording
- Beautiful: The Carole King Musical – Original Broadway Cast Recording
- Disney's Aladdin – Original Broadway Cast Recording (as Executive Producers)
- Love's Labours Lost – Original Cast Recording
- A Second Chance – Original Cast Recording
- Venice – Original Cast Recording
- Sherie Rene Scott – All Will Be Well
- Alison Fraser – Tennessee Williams: Words and Music
- Mary Testa & Michael Starobin – Have Faith

2015

- The Last Five Years – Original Motion Picture Soundtrack
- Something Rotten! – Original Broadway Cast Recording
- The Fortress of Solitude – Original Cast Recording
- Lea DeLaria – House of David
- Lady, Be Good – 2015 Encores! Cast Recording
- Be More Chill – Original Cast Recording
- Daddy Long Legs – Original Off-Broadway Cast Recording
- Clinton, the Musical – Original Cast Recording

2016

- The Hunchback of Notre Dame – American Premiere Studio Recording

2017

- Lerner & Loewe's Brigadoon - New York City Center 2017 Cast Recording
- ZIPPERZ by Nathaniel Stookey & Dan Harder - World Premiere Recording

2018

- Songs for a New World - New York City Center 2018 Encores! Off-Center Cast Recording

2019

- Beetlejuice the Musical - Original Broadway Cast Recording
- Be More Chill - Original Broadway Cast Recording
- Kiss Me, Kate - 2019 Broadway Cast Recording
- Little Shop of Horrors - The New Cast Album
- Soft Power - Original Cast Recording

2021

- Fangirls – World Premiere Cast Recording

2022

- A Strange Loop - Original Broadway Cast Recording
- Mrs. Doubtfire - Original Broadway Cast Recording

2023

- Between the Lines - Original Cast Recording
- Diary of a Wimpy Kid: The Musical - Studio Cast Recording
- Kimberly Akimbo - Original Broadway Cast Recording

2024

- Harmony - Original Broadway Cast Recording
- The Gardens of Anuncia - A New Musical by Michael John LaChiusa
- Water for Elephants - Original Broadway Cast Recording

== Awards and honors ==
=== Drama Desk ===
Sh-K-Boom & Ghostlight were awarded a special 2006 Drama Desk Award for dedication to the preservation of musical theatre through original cast albums.

=== Grammy Awards and nominations ===
Best Musical Theatre Album:

2003

- Great Joy: A Gospel Christmas

2005

- Hair – The Actors' Fund of America Benefit Recording
- The 25th Annual Putnam County Spelling Bee – Original Broadway Cast Recording
- Dirty Rotten Scoundrels – Original Broadway Cast Recording

2006

- The Drowsy Chaperone – Original Broadway Cast Recording

2008

- (winner) In The Heights – Original Broadway Cast Recording

2009

- Hair – 2009 Broadway Revival Cast Recording

2011

- (winner) The Book of Mormon – Original Broadway Cast Recording
- Anything Goes – 2011 Broadway Cast Recording

2014

- (winner) Beautiful: The Carole King Musical – Original Broadway Cast Recording
- A Gentleman's Guide to Love and Murder – Original Broadway Cast Recording
- Aladdin (musical) – Original Broadway Cast Recording

2021

- Little Shop of Horrors - The New Cast Album
- Soft Power - Original Cast Recording

2024

- Kimberly Akimbo - Original Broadway Cast Recording
