= Cable Street (disambiguation) =

Cable Street is a street in London's East End, famous for the Battle of Cable Street, a riot in 1936. The Battle also inspired a musical called Cable Street which opened in 2024.

== Other Cable Streets ==
Cable Street can refer to streets in these English towns (with postcode):

  - Bolton (BL1 2)
  - Braunton, Devon (EX33)
  - Connah's Quay, Flintshire (CH5)
  - Darlington (DL3)
  - Deeside (CH5 4)
  - Formby (L37 3)
  - Ilkeston, Erewash (DE7)
  - Knebworth (SG3)
  - Lancaster, England (LA1)
  - Liverpool (L1 8)
  - Manchester (M4 5)
  - Salford (M3 7)
  - Southampton (SO14 5)
  - Southport (PR9 0)
  - Stanton, Gloucestershire (WR12)
  - Wolverhampton (WV2 2)

For the Cable Street Particulars, a fictional secret police force (whose office is in a fictional Cable Street) in Terry Pratchett's Discworld series, see Ankh-Morpork City Watch.
