= Molly Lynch =

Irish actress

Molly Lynch is an Irish actress, singer and musician who is best known for playing Eliza Doolittle in My Fair Lady and Cathy Hiatt in The Last Five Years.

== Early life and education ==
Lynch grew up in the Frankfield area of Douglas in Cork. Her paternal grandfather was Irish singer Pat Lynch, and her maternal grandfather, Con McGowan, was an opera singer. She trained at the Cork School of Music, graduating with a BA in music in 2012 and also trained at the Central School of Speech and Drama in London in 2013–2014.

== Career ==
Lynch made her West End debut in the ENO production of Carousel with Alfie Boe and Katherine Jenkins in 2017 at London Coliseum.

In 2017 Lynch joined the cast of Sunset Boulevard as Betty Schaefer. The show also included Ria Jones as Norma Desmond and Danny Mac and went on a UK tour, after opening at the Curve theatre in Leicester. In 2020 the Curve announced the streaming of the show as part of "Curve - at Home", when the theatre had to remain closed to the public due to COVID-19 restrictions.

Lynch was part of The Light in the Piazza at the Royal Festival Hall in 2019, as a member of the ensemble and understudy for the role of Clara (played by Dove Cameron). Cast for the show included: Renée Fleming, Dove Cameron, Alex Jennings and Rob Houchen. The musical transferred to the LA Opera for a short run in October 2019.

Lynch then played the role of Cathy in the two-people Jason Robert Brown musical The Last Five Years at the Southwark Playhouse in 2020. The show closed due to the COVID-19 pandemic in March/April and re-opened in October of the same year. Alongside Lynch, actor Oli Higginson joined her in the unique version of the show, where both actors were accompanying songs playing various instruments. The musical finally transferred to the Garrick Theatre in the West End in 2021 for a limited one-month run before closing in the same year.

In December 2024 Lynch starred as Eliza Doolittle in the Leicester Curve's production of My Fair Lady, directed by Artistic Director Nikolai Foster.

=== Stage ===
Year	Title	Role	Theatre
2012	Sweeney Todd	Ensemble, cover Johanna	English National Opera
2017	Carousel	standby Julie Jordan	English National Opera
2017	Sunset Boulevard	Betty Schaefer	Leicester Curve and UK tour
2019	The Light in the Piazza	Ensemble, u/s Clara	Royal Festival Hall and LA Opera
2019 - 2020 2021	The Last Five Years	Cathy Hiatt	Southwark Playhouse Garrick Theatre
2023	Killing the Cat	Heather	
2024 - 2025	My Fair Lady	Eliza Doolittle	Leicester Curve
2025	Here We Are		National Theatre
2025 - 2026	The Sound Of Music	Maria Von Trapp	Leicester Curve

=== Film ===
Year	Title	Role	Notes
2017	Long Walk to Never	Girl	Short film
2018	Kerry Mucklowe: Silent Night		Short film
2020	The Last Five Years	Cathy Hiatt	
2020	Sunset Boulevard	Betty Schaefer	streamed by Curve at Home

== Awards and nominations ==
Year	Work	Award	Category	Result
2021	The Last Five Years	The Offies	Best Female Performance in a Musical	Nominated
