= Wonder in the World =

Studio album by Kelli O'Hara
- Released: May 6, 2008 (North America)
- Recorded: NYC, June 19–22, 2006
- Genre: pop, traditional pop, Broadway, jazz, American Songbook
- Label: Ghostlight Records
- Producer: Tracey Freeman

Professional ratings
Review scores
Source	Rating
Allmusic	3.5/5 stars

Wonder in the World is the debut solo album by American Broadway artist Kelli O'Hara, and it was released by Ghostlight Records on May 6, 2008. The music is arranged and orchestrated by Harry Connick, Jr.

The album was originally recorded for Sony in 2006, a couple of days after the closing date for the musical The Pajama Game on Broadway, where O'Hara and Connick had the leads. Harry Connick, Jr plays piano on 12 of the album's 14 tracks.

The album's first track is written by O'Hara's husband Greg Naughton. Harry Connick, Jr. has written three of the tracks, and sings a duet with O'Hara on the title track "Wonder in the World".

The song "Fable", is the closing number from Adam Guettel's Light in the Piazza.

Wonder In the World appeared on Billboard's Jazz chart shortly after its release in May, 2008, and peaked at the number 12 position.

== Track listing ==
#	Title	Songwriters	Notes	Length
1	"The Sun Went Out"	Greg Naughton		3:43
2	"Wonder in the World	Harry Connick, Jr.	A duet with Harry Connick, Jr.	4:13
3	"And So It Goes"	Billy Joel		3:31
4	"Here Now"	Kelli O'Hara		3:27
5	"And I Love You So"	Don McLean		4:32
6	"Spooky"	Buddy Buie, James B. Cobb Jr.		3:08
7	"All You Get Is Me"	Harry Connick, Jr.		3:55
8	"All the Way"	Sammy Cahn, Jimmy Van Heusen		3:14
9	"Fable"	Adam Guettel		3:31
10	"Slowly"	Harry Connick, Jr.		3:02
11	"Fire and Rain"	James Taylor	this track feature Connick on piano, bass, drums, and keyboards	4:18
12	"I Love You the World"	Kelli O'Hara		4:09
13	"I Have Dreamed"	Richard Rodgers, Oscar Hammerstein II		3:40
14	"Make Someone Happy"	Betty Comden, Adolph Green, Jule Styne		4:30
