= Edges (musical) =

2005 musical by Benj Pasek and Justin Paul

- Music: Benj Pasek; Justin Paul
- Lyrics: Benj Pasek; Justin Paul
- Book: Benj Pasek; Justin Paul
- Productions: List of productions

Edges (sometimes produced as Edges: A Song Cycle) is a work of musical theatre by Benj Pasek and Justin Paul. This work is a song cycle about coming of age, growth and self-discovery of people mostly in their 20s.

== History ==
The musical was written by Pasek & Paul in 2005 when they were 19-year-old undergraduates in musical theatre at the University of Michigan. They decided to write their own show after being unhappy with the roles they were assigned in musical theatre productions at the school.

In 2006 the duo won a $20,000 Jonathan Larson Award, becoming the youngest to have ever won the award, which was established by the estate of Rent composer Jonathan Larson to encourage composers, lyricists, and bookwriters at the beginning of their careers.

== Productions ==
After over 30 productions at colleges across the United States, the first professional production was at the Capital Repertory Theatre in Albany, New York, in 2007 starring Colin Hanlon, Whitney Bashor, Farah Alvin and Steven Booth. Justin Paul was musical director for the production. The show has now been done over 100 times across North America, Asia, Australia, Europe and Africa.

A 2008 Toronto production featured Sara Farb, Jordan Bell, Eric Craig and Gabi Epstein.

In 2010 Edges was brought out to Australia by James Anthony Productions in Sydney to the Parade Theatre in Kensington.

A Philippine production ran for three weeks in July 2010 at the Ateneo de Manila University. It was staged by Ateneo Blue Repertory under the direction of Mahar Mangahas.

A non professional production was performed at the Landor Theatre, London, UK from May 31, 2011 to June 5, 2011, the inaugural production of Notion Theatre Company, directed by Katherine Hare and with musical direction by Leigh Thompson.

The South African premiere production took place in June 2011, directed by Paul Griffiths with musical direction by Garth Tavares. The cast featured Roland Perold, Luella Holland, Shannyn Fourie and David Fick. The production toured the South African National Arts Festival in Makhanda in July.

A Cantonese production was performed in Kwai Tsing Theatre, Hong Kong in 2012. This production was presented by theatre company Musical Trio.

Edges made its Singapore premiere in April 2013 at the Drama Centre. It was staged by Derrick Chew, Artistic Director of Sightlines Productions with musical direction by Joel Nah. The cast included Benjamin Kheng, Mina Kaye, Kristy Griffin and Linden Furnell.

Edges made its premiere in Paris, France in June 2013 presented by American Musical Theatre Live. The production was directed by Stéphane Ly-Cuong with musical direction by John Florencio and vocal direction by Miranda Crispin.

The UK professional premiere took place at the Tabard Theatre from 29 July - 30 August 2014 with direction by Adam Philpott and Choreography by Lewis Butler

Edges made its Houston premiere in April 2016 at Frenetic Theatre. The production was produced by PMT Productions and starred Blair Carrizales, Danny Dyer, Scott Lupton, and Chaney Moore. The production was directed by Travis Kirk Coombs and Music Directed by Eduardo Guzman. On July 13, 2018 Edges was performed as part of a Masters' thesis project at the Guildford School of Acting. In January 2024, the musical was revived by 'Taylor Jay Productions' at Phoenix Arts Club, London.

== Song List ==
=== 2005 Original ===
- "Become" - Man 1, Woman 1, Man 2, Woman 2
- "Boy with Dreams" - Man 1
- "Caitlyn and Haley" - Woman 1, Woman 2
- "Be My Friend" - Woman 1, Man 2, Woman 2, Man 1
- "Transition #1"
- "Lying There" - Woman 1
- "I Once Knew" - Man 1
- "Transition #2"
- "I Hmm You" - Man 2, Woman 2
- "I've Gotta Run" - Woman 2
- "Man of My Dreams" - Woman 1, Man 1, Man 2, Woman 2
- "Transition #3"
- "Part of a Painting" - Man 2
- "Ready to Be Loved" - Woman 1, Woman 2
- "Coasting" - Man 1, Man 2, Woman 1, Woman 2

=== 2007 Revised Version ===
- "Become" - Man 1, Woman 1, Man 2, Woman 2
- "Monticello" - Man 1
- "Lying There" - Woman 1
- "I Hmm You" - Man 2, Woman 2
- "Along the Way" - Man 2
- "Pretty Sweet Day" - Man 1, Man 2
- "Transition #2"
- "Perfect" - Woman 2
- "Better" - Man 2, Woman 2
- "Coasting" - Man 1, Man 2, Woman 1, Woman 2
- "In Short" - Woman 1
- "Transition #3"
- "Dispensable" - Man 2, Woman 1
- "I've Gotta Run" - Woman 2
- "I Once Knew" - Man 1
- "Part of a Painting" - Man 2
- "Transition #4"
- "Ready to Be Loved" - Woman 1, Woman 2
- "Like Breathing" - Man 1, Woman 1, Man 2, Woman 2

Samples of the songs can be found at the composers' official site.
