= Colin Hanlon =

American actor

- Born: November 1, 1977 (age 48)
- Occupations: Actor, singer, production assistant, producer, sound operator
- Years active: 2000–present

Colin Hanlon (born November 1, 1977) is an American actor and theatre director.

He is known for his role of Tim Trull on Submissions Only.

== Biography ==
Hanlon has a BFA in Drama from Syracuse University.

After appearing in numerous commercials, Hanlon began work in the theatre. He has appeared on Broadway as Gordon, Mark, and Roger in Rent, and played Fiyero in the national tour of Wicked. Off-Broadway, he has starred as Frederic in The Pirates of Penzance and Austin Bennett in I Love You Because. He also appeared in the world premiere of Edges. On screen, he starred as Tim Trull on the web series Submissions Only, which ran for three seasons, and played Steven on Modern Family. In 2015, he starred as Pete in the new play The 12 at the Denver Center, for which he won a Henry Award.

== Theatre credits ==
Year	Show	Role	Notes
Unknown	Rent	Gordon/The Man/Mr. Grey/Mark Cohen (u/s)/Roger Davis (u/s)	Broadway
2001	The Pirates of Penzance	Frederic	off-Broadway
2004	Tick, Tick... Boom!	Unknown	London Fringe
2005	Falsettos	Whizzer	Huntington Theatre
2006	Rags	Ensemble	New York Concert
2006	I Love You Because	Austin Bennett	off-Broadway
2007	Edges	Various	world premiere
2010	On a Clear Day You Can See Forever	Warren	New York Stage and Film, Jul 29 – August 1, 2010
2010	Next Fall	Luke	St. Louis Repertory Theatre, Oct 27 – November 14, 2010
2011	Wicked	Fiyero	1st National Tour
2011	Next Thing You Know	Darren	CAP21, June 2011
2013	Emma	Frank Churchill	Arizona Theatre Company, Emma played by Anneliese van der Pol
2015	The 12	Pete	Denver Center
2015	The 25th Annual Putnam County Spelling Bee	Douglas Panch	Buck County Playhouse, Aug/Sep. 2015
2016	Dot	Adam	off-Broadway, Vineyard Theatre
2016	Falsettos	Understudy: Marvin, Whizzer, Mendel	Broadway
2017	In Transit	Steven – Replacement (January 10–29, 2017)	Broadway
2026	Kowalski	Director	Off-Broadway (2025), Lookingglass Theatre Company, 2026.
2026	The Fantasticks	Assistant Director	Broadway

== TV credits ==
Year	Title	Role	Notes
2010–2014	Submissions Only	Tim Trull	22 episodes; also producer & sound operator
2012–2018	Modern Family	Steven	5 episodes
2015	Snuggle Buddies	Christopher Beige	1 episode
2022	Uncoupled	Jonathan #1	3 episodes

== Film credits ==
Year	Title	Role	Notes
2010	See You in September	N/A	accounting production assistant
2016	Dead Ant	N/A	production assistant

== Discography ==
Year	Title	Notes
2006	I Love You Because (Original Cast Recording)	Principal vocalist (on 11/20 tracks)
2012	Next Thing You Know (Original Cast Recording)	Off-Broadway (CAP21)

== Awards ==
Year	Award	Category	Nominee	Result
2015	Henry Award	Best New Show	The 12	Won
