= The Composer Is Dead =

Composition with narration by Lemony Snicket and Nathanial Stookey

- Author: text by Lemony Snicket; music by Nathaniel Stookey
- Illustrator: Carson Ellis
- Language: English
- Publisher: HarperCollins
- Publication date: March 3, 2009
- Publication place: United States
- Media type: Print

The Composer Is Dead is a 2009 composition for narrator and orchestra, released both as a musical recording and as a book with a CD insert, with text by Lemony Snicket, music by Nathaniel Stookey, and illustrations by Carson Ellis. It is a whodunnit about the orchestra.

== Plot ==
The Composer Is Dead is a murder mystery about the killing of a composer. It takes place in an orchestra, and also is designed to help introduce children to instruments. The book also includes a bonus CD of one of Lemony Snicket's concerts.

== Orchestral work ==
The Composer Is Dead was originally created as an orchestral work by Nathaniel Stookey with narration by Lemony Snicket. The work was commissioned by the San Francisco Symphony and premiered at Davies Symphony Hall on July 8, 2006, with Lemony Snicket narrating and Edwin Outwater conducting. It was first published by G. Schirmer/Associated Music Publishers.

The Composer Is Dead was inspired by Sergei Prokofiev's Peter and the Wolf and is similar to Benjamin Britten's The Young Person's Guide to the Orchestra in that it is intended to introduce young audiences to the instruments in the orchestra. The world premiere recording by the San Francisco Symphony, with Handler narrating as Snicket and Edwin Outwater conducting, is to be included with every copy of the expanded book.

After its premiere, The Composer Is Dead was immediately taken up by the Toronto Symphony's New Creations Festival and has since been programmed by many orchestras including the Chicago Symphony, the Philadelphia Orchestra, the Dallas Symphony, the Buffalo Philharmonic Orchestra, the Los Angeles Philharmonic, Orpheus Sinfonia and the Treasure Valley Symphony. On January 26, 2008, Dino Antagonist led the Little Orchestra Society in the work's New York premiere at Avery Fisher Hall.
