= Adam Lenson =

Adam Lenson (25 May 1985 – 8 October 2026) was a theatre director, dramaturg, creative technologist and activist, best known for his work in musical theatre. In 2020 Lenson was named among The Stage 100 for his contribution to new musical and digital theatre.

== Theatre ==
Lenson developed, dramaturged and directed world premieres including Flyby (with composer Theo Jamieson), Wasted, Cable Street, Precipice and Public Domain as well as revivals of The Rink and Songs for a New World.

== Signal Concert Series ==
Lenson founded the concert series Signal to support the development of artist-driven new musicals. When describing the work presented (which was uniformly songs presented as world premiers) Lenson said “the paint was still wet”. Signal showcased new songs by writers and composers including Toby Marlow and Lucy Moss, Sheila Atim, Anoushka Lucas, Darren Clark and Duncan Sheik.

== Publications ==
Lenson's book Breaking Into Song: Why You Shouldn't Hate Musicals was published in 2021.

In 2016, he created the podcast Dischord: Figuring Out Musical Theatre.

== Solo Shows ==
In 2023, Lenson took his show Anything That We Wanted To Be to Summerhall at the Edinburgh Fringe Festival.

Lenson followed this in 2026 with Is It Too Late Now To Say Sorry? The piece was directed by Daniel Goldman.

== Activism ==
Lenson campaigned for authentic representation of Jewish people. In 2019, when Falsettos, a musical about a Jewish family, was produced at The Other Palace theatre ‘without a single Jewish cast or creative team member’, he publicly signed a letter along with Jewish theatre makers. In 2022, Lenson also wrote an opinion piece in the Jewish Chronicle on the topic.

== Personal life ==
Lenson studied Natural Sciences at Queens' College, Cambridge. He was married to Emma Jude Harris from 2024.
