= Rodney Hicks =

American actor

- Hicks in 2026
- Born: March 28, 1974 (age 52); Philadelphia, Pennsylvania, U.S.
- Education: Roxborough High School
- Occupations: Actor, playwright, screenwriter
- Spouse: Chris Coleman

Rodney Hicks (born March 28, 1974) is an American actor, playwright, and screenwriter. He is perhaps best known for originating the role of Bob in the Broadway musical Come from Away (2017) as well as playing various roles in the original and closing Broadway cast of the musical Rent.

== Career ==
Hicks made his Broadway debut in 1996 as part of the original cast of the musical Rent, where he originated the role of Paul and was the understudy for the role of Benjamin Coffin III. He returned to the cast of Rent in 2007 as the main performer of Benjamin Coffin III, originated by Taye Diggs, where he became the final actor to play the role before the production closed that year. The final performance, including Hicks, was recorded in Rent: Filmed Live on Broadway. In 2000, Hicks starred as Peter in revival of Jesus Christ Superstar, which ran for six months in the Lyric Theatre on Broadway. Hicks later also starred as Joe Bonaparte in the 2000 revival of Charles Strouse's Golden Boy. Off-Broadway, he co-starred alongside Robert Cuccioli in the 2006 revival of Jacques Brel is Alive and Well and Living in Paris, and can be heard on the new cast recording.

In 2010, he played the role of Clarence Norris in the musical The Scottsboro Boys, which was directed and choreographed by Tony Award winner Susan Stroman at Off-Broadway's Vineyard Theatre. The show opened on March 10 and ran until April 18, 2010. The show has received 9 Drama Desk nominations including Best New Musical, 6 Outer Critics Circle awards including Best New Musical and is the winner of two Lucille Lortel awards including Outstanding New Musical and Outstanding Choreography. The show opened on Broadway October 31, 2010, after beginning previews on the 6th of that month. It closed December 12, 2010. He played the lead role of Haywood Patterson in the 2012 Philadelphia Theatre Company production of The Scottsboro Boys, where he was awarded the 2012 Barrymore Award for Outstanding Leading Male in a Musical. At the Village Theatre in Seattle, Hicks played the role of Jim, where he was recognized with a Seattle Times Footlight Award for his performance and a Broadway World Seattle's Critics Choice Award (Jay's Picks) for Outstanding Leading Actor.

In 2011, Hicks played the role of Curly in the first all African-American cast of Oklahoma! at Portland Center Stage in Portland, Oregon. The production was directed by Chris Coleman, whom Hicks would later marry.

In 2014, Hicks took part in a lab production of Come from Away, which would later open on Broadway on March 12, 2017. Rodney departed from the cast of Come from Away on June 14, 2017, after being diagnosed with spasmodic dysphonia, a neurological condition that causes a person's voice to spasm. Hicks was subsequently unable to appear in the live stage recording of the musical, released in 2021 on Apple TV+. After treatment, Hicks regained his ability to speak and sing clearly. He has appeared in regional theatres across the country varying in plays from King Lear, Lobby Hero through to Ain't Misbehavin' and Two Gentlemen of Verona. In 2023, he played Walter in Chess at The Muny.

Hicks is currently working on a writing project called, '1 9 6 8'. Hicks's published work as a playwright includes Ms. Pearl's Cabaret (2019 Eugene O'Neill Playwriting Conference Semi-Finalist), FLAME BROILED. or the ugly play (Premiered at Local Theatre Company, Boulder CO, Fall 2019), and Just Press Save (2018 Eugene O'Neill Playwriting Conference Semi-Finalist), the last of which was featured at the 2020 Pride Plays Festival. The virtual reading and workshop was directed by Michael Greif, who previously directed Hicks in Rent.

Off-stage, Hicks has appeared on several television shows, such as portraying Delray Williams in NYPD Blue, the guest lead Jerome Davis in an episode of Law & Order: Criminal Intent and as Perry on the last season of ABC's Hope and Faith playing opposite Faith Ford and Johnny Galecki. While living in the Pacific Northwest Hicks guest-starred on NBC's Grimm and TNT's Leverage.

== Personal life ==
Hicks was born and raised in Philadelphia. He graduated from Roxborough High School in 1992. That same year, he enrolled in Mansfield University, but dropped out in 1994 to pursue acting as a full-time career. He earned early success performing alongside Lauryn Hill from the hip/hop group The Fugees in the musical Bring in the Morning - A Wake up Call, followed by a role in the John Adams and June Jordan pop opera I Was Looking at the Ceiling and Then I Saw the Sky, which was directed by Peter Sellars.

Hicks is married to Chris Coleman, the artistic director at the Denver Theatre Center for Performing Arts, whom he met while auditioning for Oklahoma!. After getting diagnosed with spasmodic dysphonia, Hicks returned to his home in the Pacific Northwest with Coleman to recover. Since his move to Denver in 2018, Hicks has had a world premiere of his play 'FLAME BROILED. or the ugly play' and continues to write and act. Hicks is a meditator.
