= Dan Harder =

American writer

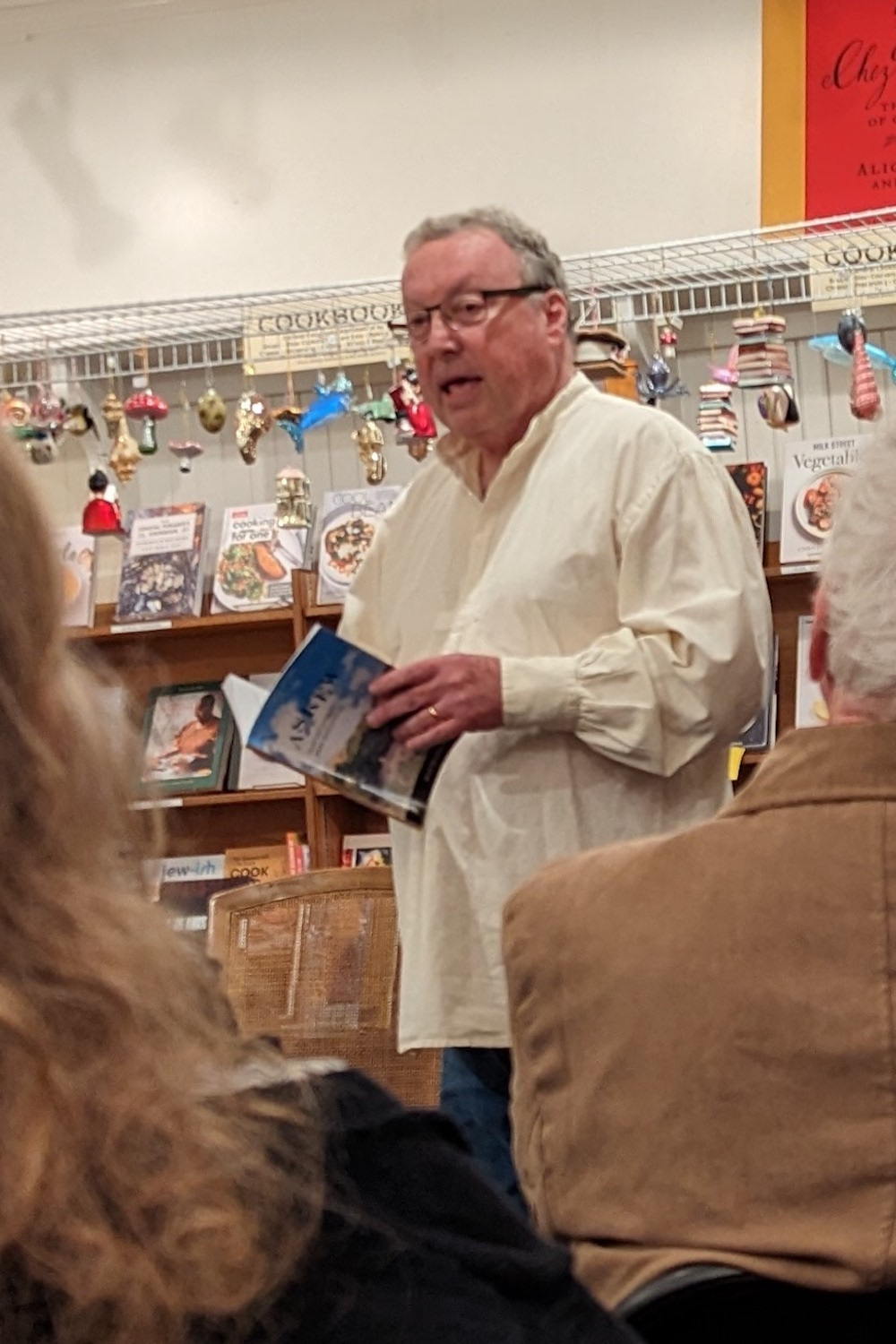
Photo of Dan Harder in Mendocino, CA doing a public reading from his book of poetry, "Askew", in 2023

Dan Harder is a San Francisco-based writer who taught English and philosophy at the International High School in San Francisco. He graduated from UC Berkeley in an Individual Major that combined Sociology, Cognitive Science, and Architecture. Subsequently, he moved to France for three years before settling in the Bay Area.

== Writing ==
Harder writes poetry, stage plays, opera librettos, novels, children's books, and journalism.

He devised “zipper poetry”, in which he zips two poems into a third by interlinking the lines of each of the two separate poems. The sum of the parts becomes a whole new whole. According to Harder's self-imposed rules, each poem must be able to stand alone and make sense semantically and syntactically. The first fully realized exploration of this form was in his poetry book, Askew (2007).

This was followed by an opera (music by Nathaniel Stookey) commissioned by Michael Morgan of the Oakland East Bay Symphony entitled Zipperz (2008) which was subsequently recorded and released by Ghostlight/Sh-K-Boom/Warner records (2017). As a composer, Stookey was attracted to Harder's zippered format because, like music, it is distinctly contrapuntal — two parts are independent and self-sufficient but together form a harmonious whole. Because of this formal style, the narrative of Zipperz simultaneously interweaves the attractions, fears, joys, and insights of a man and woman who meet, date, and—eventually in love – zip their lives together.

The zippered form was also used with three voices in his stage play A Killer Story (2013) and was featured in The Untouchables…, a series of his poems about the unhoused published on the front page of the Opinion Section, San Francisco Chronicle (2018).

Harder and composer Carlos Simon have created a dramatic oratorio, “Here I Stand” about famous singer and civil rights activist Paul Robeson that will be premiered by the Oakland East Bay Symphony then travel to The Kennedy Center in 2024.

Harder has also written 2 children's books Colliding with Chris and A Child's California, as well as numerous features and articles for the Los Angeles Times, the San Francisco Chronicle and commentaries for NPR, 2 photo-essay books, numerous stage plays, and a novel, Rancho de Amor.

== Stage works ==
Title	Role	Genre	Collaborator	Theatre
Utopia Maldita	Playwright	Play	Richard Marriott (score), Gustavo Vasquez (video)	Theater Artaud, Space 124, San Francisco, CA
Zipperz	Librettist	(Pop) Opera	Nathaniel Stookey (score)	Oakland Symphony, Oakland, CA etc.
A Killer Story	Playwright	Play	Randy Craig (score)	The Marsh, San Francisco, CA, etc.
The Clean Break	Playwright	Play		Murphys Creek Theatre, Murphys, CA
Quartet #1 for Three Characters and Cello	Playwright	Play	Randy Craig (score)	Actors Theater, San Francisco, CA, etc.
Maria Hidalgo-Smith Wears the Highest Heels	Playwright	Play		Throckmorten, Mill Valley, CA
Trying Angles	Playwright	Play		Bannam Place Theater, San Francisco, etc.
Androktasia	Playwright	Play		Jewish Community Theater, San Francisco, CA, etc.

== Books ==
Title	Style	Publisher	Year
My Brilliant Destiny and Other Distractions	Poetry	Amazon KDP	2023
Rancho De Amor	Novel	West Margin Press, Berkeley, CA	2020
Zipperz	Opera Book/Libretto	Shirmer/Wise Music, New York, New York	2017
Askew	Poetry Book	Pince Nez Press, San Francisco, CA	2007
A Child’s California	Children's Book	Westwind Press, Portland, OR	2000
Colliding With Chris	Children's Book	Hyperion/Disney, New York, New York	1998
San Francisco Points of View	Photo-Essay	Graphic Arts Center Publishing, Portland, OR	1996
France	Photo-Essay	Graphic Arts Center Publishing, Portland, OR	1992
Generous Misgivings	Poetry Chapbook	Studio 301, San Francisco, CA	1985
