= Rent: Filmed Live on Broadway =

- Advertisement poster
- Directed by: Michael John Warren
- Written by: Jonathan Larson
- Produced by: Justin Wilkes; Jon Kamen
- Starring: Adam Kantor; Will Chase; Renée Elise Goldsberry; Michael McElroy; Justin Johnston; Eden Espinosa; Tracie Thoms; Rodney Hicks
- Cinematography: Declan Quinn
- Edited by: Edward Bishop; Josh Pearson; Adam Zuckerman
- Music by: Jonathan Larson
- Production company: RadicalMedia
- Distributed by: Sony Pictures Releasing; The Hot Ticket
- Release date: September 24, 2008
- Running time: 152 minutes
- Country: United States
- Language: English

Rent: Filmed Live on Broadway is a 2008 film of the final performance of the original Broadway production of the musical Rent on September 7, 2008, it was filmed live at the Nederlander Theatre in New York City, with some footage of the closing night celebration. The original Broadway production was recorded during its final performances between August 20 and September 7, 2008, capturing the closing weeks of the 12-year Broadway run. The film had a limited theatrical release between September 24 and 28, 2008, in more than 500 theaters with high definition digital projection systems in the US and Canada. According to Sony Pictures Releasing President Rory Bruer, it was the first live Broadway show to be available in major North American movie theaters. The film was released on DVD and Blu-ray on February 3, 2009.

The film is assembled from footage shot at the September 7 performance as well as a day of shooting on August 20. It includes a reprise of "Seasons of Love" featuring both the final cast and cast members from past productions, including the original Broadway cast following the finale of the show proper.

== Cast ==
(In order of appearance, starting with the eight major characters)

- Adam Kantor as Mark Cohen
- Will Chase as Roger Davis
- Michael McElroy as Thomas B. "Tom" Collins
- Rodney Hicks as Benjamin "Benny" Coffin III
- Tracie Thoms as Joanne Jefferson
- Justin Johnston as Angel Dumott-Schunard
- Renée Elise Goldsberry as Mimi Marquez
- Eden Espinosa as Maureen Johnson
- Tracy McDowell as Mrs. Cohen / Pam / Ensemble
- Marcus Paul James as Mr. Jefferson / Pastor / “Seasons of Love” soloist / Ensemble
- Gwen Stewart as Mrs. Jefferson / Ali / Woman with bags / "Seasons of Love" soloist / Mrs. Marquez / Ensemble
- Jay Wilkison as Gordon / The Man / Mr. Grey / Ensemble
- Telly Leung as Steve / Man with squeegee / Waiter / Ensemble
- Shaun Earl as Paul / Cop / Ensemble
- Andrea Goss as Lisa / Alexi Darling / Mrs. Davis / Ensemble

Rodney Hicks and Gwen Stewart are the only cast members who appeared in the original Broadway cast version, and Stewart is the only one to reprise her roles, and would later play the same roles at the Hollywood Bowl (although Hicks was also a Benny understudy in the original). Tracie Thoms, who played the role of Joanne in the film version, Jay Wilkison, and Shaun Earl were the only cast members featured in the film. The character "Sue", a member of the Life Support group, was renamed "Lisa" in this version. Telly Leung would later play Angel on the RENT tour in 2009, and at the Hollywood Bowl in 2010. Tracie Thoms would later reprise her role as Joanne at the Hollywood Bowl as well.

== Reception ==
In comparing the film with the stageplay, Peter Travers of Rolling Stone wrote, "Nothing can compare with seeing a show conceived for the stage in an actual performance. But the cinecast of Rent, staged directed by the original's Michael Greif and for the camera by Michael John Warren, comes close. It's electrifying. Jon Kamen and the wizards at radical.media have utilized state-of-the-art high-definition video and digital audio technology to make the show come alive. Thanks to the gifted cinematographer Declan Quinn (Leaving Las Vegas, Monsoon Wedding), it practically jumps off the screen... ...For the first time ever, audiences across the country who couldn't see Rent and watch members of the original cast join the new cast onstage for the final curtain reprise of 'Seasons of Love', can share the experience". Of the film itself, Broadway World wrote, "the film is a dynamic way to bring the show to audiences across the country one last time".

== Release ==
Rent: Filmed Live on Broadway was released on DVD and Blu-ray, in Region 1, on February 3, 2009 and on 21 September 2009 on Region 2. Both releases include featurettes on the ending of the show: "RENT: The Final Days on Broadway" looks at the cast and crew's final days as well as the filming; "The Final Curtain Call" looks at the final reprise of "Seasons of Love"; "The Wall" looks at the famous backstage wall on which hundreds of messages have been written; and "The Final Lottery" which documents the final lottery for tickets. There was a PSA for The Marfan Foundation.

The Blu-ray disc has some exclusive special features including two more featurettes, a PSA for the Jonathan Larson Performing Arts Foundation, and BD-Live functionality. The featurettes are entitled "Home" - A Behind-the-Scenes look at the theater that was transformed into the home for RENT, and "Casting" - Bernard Telsey talks about casting the show for the last 12 years.
