= Cable Street (musical) =

- Music: Tim Gilvin
- Lyrics: Tim Gilvin
- Book: Alex Kanefsky
- Setting: 1936 East End of London
- Basis: The Battle of Cable Street
- Premiere: 16 February 2024: Southwark Playhouse
- Productions: 2024 Off West End; 2026 Off West End

Cable Street is a British musical with music and lyrics by Tim Gilvin‍ and book by Alex Kanefsky, based on the 1936 events of Battle of Cable Street.

== Production history ==
=== Off West End (2024 & 2026) ===
The musical made its Off West End world premiere at the Southwark Playhouse, London opening at the Borough venue from 16 February to 16 March 2024, before returning to the Elephant venue from 6 September to 10 October 2024, directed by Adam Lenson. The production will return to London at the Marylebone Theatre running from 16 January (with a press night on 26 January) to 28 February 2026.
