= Nathaniel Stookey =

American composer and musician (born 1970)

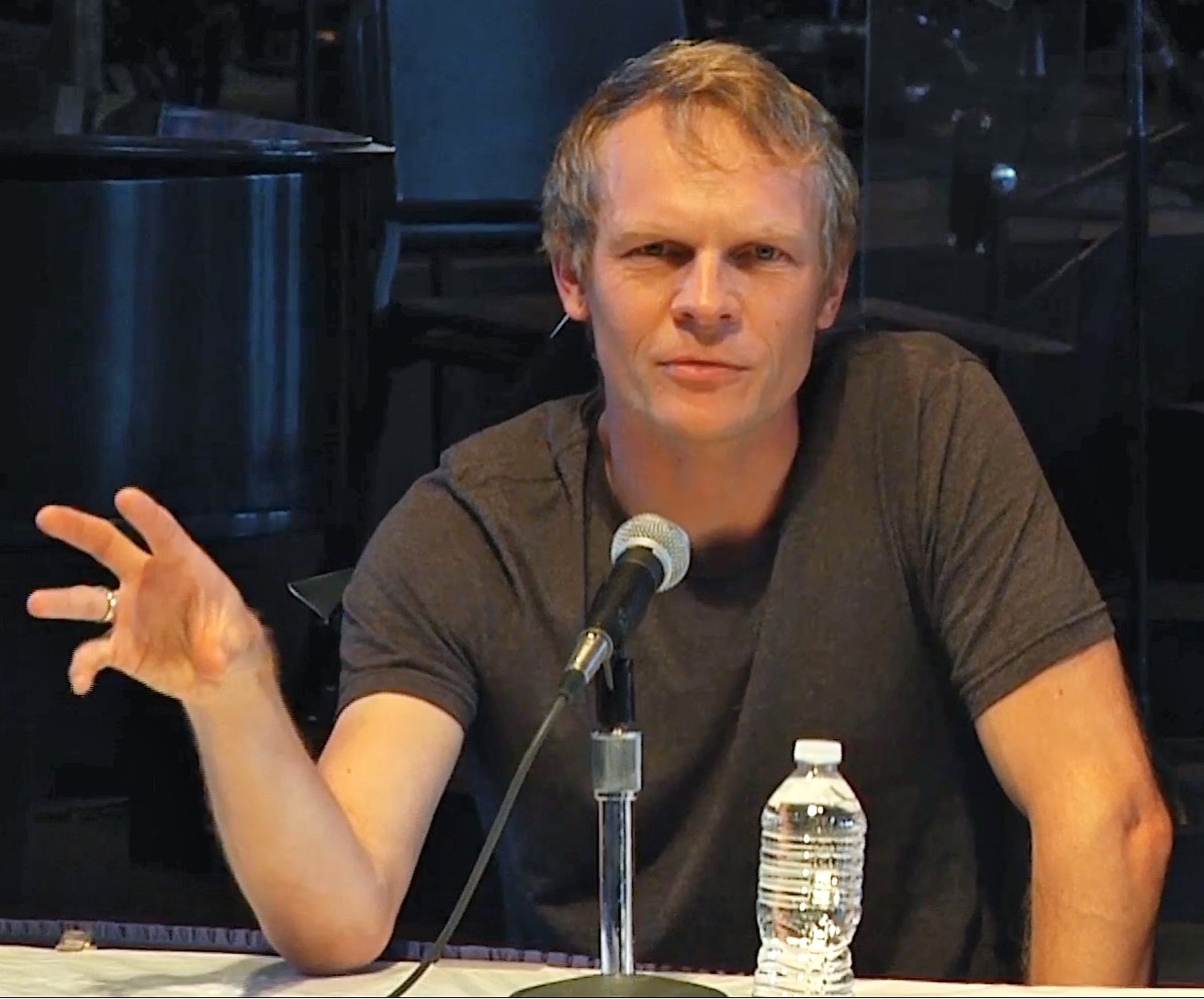
Stookey at the 2015 Cabrillo Festival of Contemporary Music

Nathaniel Stookey (born 25th April 1970, San Francisco, California) is an American composer and musician.

== Education ==
Stookey is the son of Richard Phelps Stookey, an attorney and novelist, and Martha Milton Stookey, an actor, stage director, and teacher. Both parents came from musical families: Martha's father was an Army bugler and cornet player, and Richard's grandparents were church and barn-dance musicians whose descendants include Noel Paul Stookey of the folk trio Peter, Paul & Mary. Stookey spent his early childhood in the Basque village of Banca. He attended French American International School and Lowell High School in San Francisco and Lycée Hoche in Versailles, France. He began violin study at age 5 with Anna Teksler in San Francisco, continuing with Malgorzata Rouger at the École Normale de Musique de Paris, and with Daniel Kobialka of the San Francisco Symphony. As a student, he played violin and viola with the San Francisco Symphony Youth Orchestra and sang in the chorus of Philharmonia Baroque Orchestra. He studied music theory with Donald Galfond and took his first composition lessons from Tom Constanten of the Grateful Dead at the San Francisco Community Music Center. He attended the Cleveland Institute of Music, San Francisco City College, the University of California, Berkeley (B.A. 1992), George Benjamin's composition seminars for the Royal College of Music, and Duke University (Ph.D 2003), where he was a Mary Duke Biddle Fellow and won the Klenz Prize for Composition in his first year of graduate study. Stookey's principal composition teachers were Peter Scott Lewis, Donald Erb, Andrew Imbrie, Cindy Cox, Stephen Jaffe, and Scott Lindroth.

== Orchestral music ==
Stookey was first commissioned by the San Francisco Symphony at age 17. He has held composer residencies with the Hallé Orchestra, during the music directorship of Kent Nagano, and with the North Carolina Symphony from 2000-2003, a partnership that resulted in over 60 performances of eight works, including Out of the Everywhere (2003) for large orchestra. In 2006, the San Francisco Symphony commissioned, premiered and recorded The Composer is Dead (2006), a guide to the orchestra with text by Lemony Snicket. He has narrated performances of The Composer is Dead, in English as well as Spanish. He also co-authored the Spanish and French translations of Lemony Snicket's text for The Composer is Dead. In 2010, the NDR Sinfonieorchester and Christoph Eschenbach premiered Stookey's Mahlerwerk (2010) at the final concert of the centennial "Mahler in Hamburg" Festival.

Stookey has a long-standing musical relationship with the San Francisco Symphony and was one of the original curators of SoundBox, for which he created YTTE (2016), his third commissioned work for the orchestra. Other orchestral works include the song cycles Zipperz (2008) and Into the Bright Lights (2009) as well as several shorter works: Big Bang (2000), Wide as Skies (2003) and GO (2012).

== Vocal and theatrical music ==
Stookey's earliest published composition was a contribution to the Basque-language hymnal, Meza Abestiak, a gift for the Benedictine monastery of Lazkao, where the composer lived and worked in 1990. For thy sweet love (1993) for chamber chorus and organ and other early works were published by PRB Productions before being acquired by G. Schirmer/AMP in 2015. In 2008, Manoel Felciano, Eisa Davis, and the Oakland Symphony conducted by Michael Morgan premiered Zipperz (2008) for two pop singers and orchestra, with texts by Dan Harder. In 2009, Frederica von Stade launched her farewell tour with Stookey's Into the Bright Lights (2009) for mezzo-soprano and orchestra, a setting of von Stade's own reflections on singing and aging. Zheng Cao, in her final concert appearances, substituted for von Stade in the work's U.S. premiere. Stookey created the score for John Doyle's 2010 production of Bertolt Brecht's Caucasian Chalk Circle at the American Conservatory Theater (A.C.T.) in San Francisco. His monodrama Ivonne (2012) for soprano and chamber ensemble, with texts by Jerre Dye, was commissioned by Opera Memphis as part of the Ghosts of Crosstown project and featured on Opera America's 2015 national showcase at Wolf Trap. Stookey was commissioned by West Edge Opera to compose the opera Bulrusher with a libretto by Stookey and playwright Eisa Davis based on her play Bulrusher. The opera was developed at The Cincinnati Opera during their Opera Fusion: New Works 2022.

== Chamber music ==
Himself a violinist and violist, Stookey has continued to write chamber music throughout his career. Strings Magazine profiled him in 2009 as one of the "Next Generation of String Composers." The Lindsay Quartet featured Stookey's String Quartet No. 1 (1998), dedicated to them, on their 40th anniversary tour of North America in 2004. String Quartet No. 2 – Musée Mécanique (2002) was commissioned and recorded by the Ciompi Quartet. String Quartet No. 3 – The Mezzanine (2012), inspired by Nicholson Baker's eponymous book, was commissioned by Kronos Quartet and featured at the 2015 Cabrillo Festival of Contemporary Music, where Stookey and Kronos were in residence together. Additional chamber works include Piano Trio No. 1 (2009) for The Lee Trio, Fling (2005) for flute and string trio (commissioned by the Left Coast Chamber Ensemble), Above the Thomas Gate (2001) for piano trio (commissioned by the Mallarmé Chamber Players), Tame Me (1995) for piano and prepared piano (commissioned by the Hallé Concerts Society), and Sonatina for Sam (1992) (see Alt, pop, dance, and Junk). Where Every Verse is Filled with Grief (2009) for solo violin, an arrangement of the second movement of Alfred Schnittke's Concerto for Choir, was commissioned by Kunst-Stoff for choreography by Yannis Adoniou.

== Alt, pop, dance, and junk ==
Stookey has worked often in San Francisco's experimental music scene and his work uses influences outside of classical boundaries.<> Among his early collaborators was the crossover cellist Sam Bass (of the bands Deadweight, Loop!Station and Les Claypool's Fearless Flying Frog Brigade) for whom Stookey wrote both his "opus 1" Sonatina for Sam (1992) and the song Hard Up (2011). Stookey composed and recorded the string introduction to the song Soothsayer (2007) on The Mars Volta's album The Bedlam in Goliath. In the same year, he created Junkestra (2007) for an orchestra of instruments he built from objects scavenged from the city dump, and has performed on the musical saw in this work. That work was performed in vacant warehouses and public squares before being taken up by the San Francisco Symphony and other classical presenters. Its 2010 release on Innova Recordings includes Junkestra Dance Mix (2010), also by Stookey. His composition Mahlerwerk (2011) reorders hundreds of fragments of Mahler symphonies. The work is dedicated to composer Alfred Schnittke, who coined the term polystylist to describe composers who freely combine disparate elements. Nobody Suffers Like We Do (2009), a drinking song inspired by the sounds of a convenience-store cash register, with words by Daniel Handler, was commissioned and recorded by the Harvard Din & Tonics in commemoration of their 30th anniversary season.

== Residencies, teaching, publication ==
During his residencies with the Hallé Orchestra and North Carolina Symphony, Stookey taught at the University of Sheffield and the University of North Carolina, Chapel Hill respectively. As composer-in-residence with NPR-affiliate WUNC-FM in Chapel Hill, North Carolina, he created and hosted The Composers-in-Context Series, which included both live and broadcast performances of works by living composers in the context of their musical influences. Stookey has also been composer-in-residence at the New Hampshire Music Festival, the Walden School, the Cabrillo Festival of Contemporary Music, and the Eastern Sierra Symphony. A retrospective of his output, commemorating his years in North Carolina, was presented by the School of Music of the University of North Carolina, Greensboro. Stookey sometimes plays the musical saw in Junkestra (2007) and the OOVE (a unique electroacoustic instrument by Oliver DiCicco) in YTTE (2016).

Stookey's music is published under exclusive contract by G. Schirmer/A.M.P. (Music Sales Group) of New York and London. Some works are distributed in print by Hal Leonard Corporation.

== Recordings ==
Album	Role	Librettist	Soloist(s)	Ensemble/Band	Conductor	Label	Release year
Music for Strings (1992-2002)	composer		Bonnie Thron, Brian Reagin, Rebekah Binford	North Carolina Symphony, Ciompi Quartet	William Henry Curry	Albany	2005
San Francisco Premieres	composer (Fling)			Left Coast Chamber Ensemble		Chamber Music Partnership	2005
The Bedlam in Goliath	contributor (Soothsayer)		Omar Rodríguez-López, Cedric Bixler-Zavala	The Mars Volta	Edwin Outwater	Universal/Motown	2008
The Composer is Dead	composer	Lemony Snicket	Lemony Snicket	San Francisco Symphony	Edwin Outwater	Harper Collins	2009
The Pursuit of Snappiness	composer (Nobody Suffers Like We Do)	Daniel Handler		Harvard Din & Tonics		Harvard Din & Tonics	2010
Junkestra	composer		David Weiss	San Francisco Symphony Youth Orchestra percussion section	Benjamin Shwartz	Innova Recordings	2010
O Compositor està Morto	composer	Lemony Snicket, trans. Assis	Fabio Goes	San Francisco Symphony	Edwin Outwater	Companhia das Letrinhas	2012
Le Compositeur est Mort	composer	Lemony Snicket, trans. Stookey/Matéo	Pépito Matéo	San Francisco Symphony	Edwin Outwater	Didier Jeunesse	2014
Zipperz	composer	Dan Harder	Manoel Felciano, Robin Coomer	Magik*Magik Orchestra	Donato Cabrera	Sh-K-Boom/Ghostlight	in press

== Awards and recognition ==
- Hallé Orchestra Composition Fellowship, Manchester, England 1993-96
- Mary Duke Biddle Fellowship, Duke University 1998
- Klenz Prize for Double 1999
- Meet The Composer New Residencies Award 2000-3
