= Chanukah Suite =

Chorale composition by Jason Robert Brown

Chanukah Suite is an original chorale composition by Jewish composer Jason Robert Brown. The work was debuted in December 2005 at the Walt Disney Concert Hall in two performances by the Los Angeles Master Chorale. Composed in three parts and lasting just over 8 minutes, the work is based on an innovative merging of traditional Hebrew songs with up-tempo rock and roll rhythms and harmonic fanfares.

== Structure ==
=== I. S'vivon/Al Hanism ===
S'vivon means dreidel, and the first section of the piece evokes the celebratory nature of Hanukkah, imploring sov, sov, sov, or spin, spin, spin, as a reminder that Chanukah hu chag tov (Hanukkah is indeed a good holiday). S'vivon, sov, sov, sov, Chanukah, hu chag tov. Chanukah, hu chag tov, S'vivon, sov, sov, sov. Chag sim cha, hu la am, Nesgadol ha yasham, Nesgadol ha yasham, Chag sim cha, hu la am. Al hanisim is a paragraph from the Jewish prayer service (Amidah) added during the post-Biblical Festivals of Chanukah and Purim in which they thank God for Miracles.

=== II. Mi Yemalel ===
The Mi yemalel passage asks Who can retell the things that befell us? and speaks of the stories of heroes and wise men of every age, announcing their arrivals with the repeated exclamations Sh'ma! Sh'ma! or Hark! Hark! Musically this passage features bright piano work and joyful hand clapping.

=== III. Finale: Ma'oz Tsur ===
Ma'oz Tzur or Rock of ages lifts a song of praise to God's saving power, the tower that sheltered and arms that protected, against all enemies. The finale features repetition of the lines by four soloists in different vocal ranges.

== Recordings ==
The Los Angeles Master Chorale. Grant Gershon, conductor. Lisa Edwards, piano.
