= I Love You Because =

- Off-Broadway Poster
- Music: Joshua Salzman
- Lyrics: Ryan Cunningham
- Basis: Jane Austen's novel Pride and Prejudice
- Productions: 2006 Off-Broadway; 2007 Off-West End; 2008 Australia; 2012 Canada; 2013 Liverpool

I Love You Because is a musical set in modern-day New York. It is based on Jane Austen's novel Pride and Prejudice. It features lyrics by Ryan Cunningham, set to music by Joshua Salzman.

== Production history ==
Cunningham and Salzman first met in New York University's graduate program in musical theater writing, where they began writing the songs that became I Love You Because.

Off-Broadway

The show was first performed off-Broadway in 2006 at the Village Theatre. The original off-Broadway cast included Farah Alvin as Marcy, Stephanie D'Abruzzo as Diana, Colin Hanlon as Austin and David A. Austin as Jeff, with Courtney Balan and Jordan Leeds playing a variety of bit parts as chorus members New York Woman and New York Man. All six actors performed on the original cast recording released in 2006.

The first regional production of the show ran from January 17-February 11, 2007, at the Actors' Playhouse in Coral Gables, Florida.

Off-West End

The UK premiere opened at the Landor Theatre, in association with producer Josephine Buchan, on September 19, 2007. Directed by Robert McWhir, the cast was led by Daniel Boys as Austin, Richard Frame as Jeff, Jodie Jacobs as Marcy, Debbie Kurup as Diana, Lucy Williamson and Mark Goldthorp.

Australia

The Australasian premiere season ran from August 8–16, 2008. Directed by Nathan Firmin and Brad Fischer for SHOOSH Productions, the play was staged at the Cromwell Road Theatre in Melbourne.

Canada

The Canadian Premiere opened February 10, 2012 at Studio 1398 on Granville Island in Vancouver, BC. It was produced by Intimate Theatre Productions. The show starred Sayer Roberts as Austin, Erin Palm as Marcy, Victor Hunter as Jeff, and Harper Smith as Diana with Aaron Lau and Sheryl McMillan. It was Directed by Shel Piercy, Choreographed by Shelley Stewart Hunt, and Musical Directed by Kerry O'Donovan.

The Canadian Professional Premiere opened at the Toronto Centre for the Arts Studio Space on March 30, 2012, and is produced by Angelwalk Theatre. The production is directed by Darcy Evans, and stars Jeff Madden as Austin, Elena Juatco as Marcy, Jay Davis as Jeff, and Gabi Epstein as Diana with Michael de Rose and Cara Leslie.

Liverpool

A special Valentine's production of the show ran from 12th to 15 February 2013 in the Unity Theatre in Liverpool, England. Produced by Lights Up Entertainment and co-directed by Ezequiel Serrano and Leonie Webb, the cast included Phil Teles Amaro (Austin), Lucy Mulvihill (Marcy), Stuart Crowther (Jeff), Katie Jones (Diana), Peter Fendall (NYC Man) and Zoë Evans (NYC Woman).

== Plot details ==
Act 1

At the opening of the show, Austin Bennett prepares for a date with his girlfriend Catherine, but discovers her cheating on him ("Another Saturday Night in New York"). He tells his brother Jeff, who suggests that the best way to win Catherine back is by pretending not to care. Jeff volunteers to find dates for them and plans a night on the town ("Oh What a Difference"). Meanwhile, Marcy Fitzwilliams is agonizing over her breakup with a man named Larry. Her friend Diana Bingley, an actuary, suggests some "dating rules" that will determine her ideal rebound time, telling Marcy that the best way to find Mr. Right is by finding Mr. Wrong ("The Actuary Song"). Austin and Jeff end up on a double-date with Marcy and Diana after setting one up on J-Date, despite none of them being Jewish. Diana is impressed with Jeff, but Marcy and Austin don't share a connection at all. Marcy reveals that she is a photographer, while Austin tells her that he writes greeting cards, but only as a way of supporting his passion for poetry. Austin is unable to explain this without frequently mentioning Catherine, to Marcy's annoyance ("But I Don't Want to Talk About Her"). Marcy decides Austin is "perfectly wrong" for her. Meanwhile, Jeff and Diana attempt to have sex, but Jeff throws his back out. Jeff's hospitalization gives Marcy a chance to try and continue seeing Austin. Over a conversation at the coffee shop, Marcy equates Austin's coffee preferences with his rigid lifestyle choices in general, and explains her own free-spirited nature ("Coffee"). Austin tries to call Catherine and win her back with an impromptu poem, which fails, and Marcy agrees to help him write a better one. As Jeff returns from the hospital and continues casually dating Diana, Marcy and Austin continue to work on a poem for Catherine, while fighting over details along the way. A bartender and cocktail waitress muse that their differences make them a perfect couple ("The Perfect Romance"). After Austin completes the poem, Marcy tells him to wait six months before sending it, but Jeff accidentally mails it out with the bills. Catherine's negative response ends up in Marcy's hands before Austin has seen it, and she takes him to a Chinese restaurant that offers free wine, in order to get him drunk enough to break the news to him. A series of humorous conflicts with the waiter at the restaurant result in Austin and Marcy skipping out on their bill and stealing a box of wine from the restaurant. Austin is impressed with himself for standing up for Marcy, and thanks her for his acting out of character ("Because of You"). When they are about to kiss, Marcy stops him and shows him the letter from Catherine. He grows angry, and they have a heated argument, but end up having sex. Meanwhile, Jeff and Diana articulate the nature of their "friends with benefits" relationship ("We're Just Friends"). The next day, Austin is ecstatic over his night with Marcy, and has fallen in love with her, though Marcy doesn't know how she feels about what happened. Jeff tells Austin to tell himself that he doesn't love her. Austin tries, but ends up thinking their relationship might have a future ("Maybe We Just Made Love"). Austin admits his feelings to Marcy, who rejects him, telling him she isn't ready for true love ("Just Not Now"). Ashamed, Austin goes home, and finds Catherine waiting for him.

Act 2

On the streets of New York, Marcy meets the bartender and cocktail waitress from her first date with Austin, and tells them what happened. They elaborate on the joys of singlehood, and assure her she's better off. Marcy agrees at first, but changes her mind after seeing a happy couple on the street ("Alone"). Meanwhile, Diana is with Austin and Jeff in their apartment, where Austin has ordered Chinese food. The delivery man turns out to be the same waiter Austin skipped out on earlier. While Austin and the delivery man are settling the bill in another room, Diana tells Jeff she wants to be exclusive. Jeff responds with fear, spelling out the negative impact that would result if they were to be a real couple ("That's What's Gonna Happen"). After the delivery man leaves, Marcy shows up and tells Austin she loves him despite all his flaws, which she mentions in great detail ("Even Though"). Austin is offended by the "anyway" aspect of her love, and rejects her, telling her Catherine has taken him back. Diana, Jeff, Marcy, and Austin sing separately about the hurt they feel from not being with the ones they love ("But I Do"). Marcy and Diana go back to the bar where they had the first double date to drink and forget. The bartender and cocktail waitress remember them, and they all tell tales of lost love in the past, vowing to give up dating. Marcy and Diana have a change of heart, and the bartender and cocktail waitress imply that they were trying to make that happen all along ("What Do We Do it For?"). Diana tries to talk to Jeff, but is interrupted by Austin, who is fretting that Catherine doesn't know how he takes his coffee, despite having dated him for five years. Diana explains to Austin that everyone needs someone to love, and Marcy is his. Jeff also admits that he loves Diana ("Marcy's Yours"). Austin vows to rid himself of his uptight nature, knowing Marcy will accept him no matter what ("Goodbye"). In the final scene, Austin is trying to write a poem for Marcy, but she arrives before he can finish it. He improvises one, spelling out the ways she is different from him, but saying that rather than loving her "anyway" (as she had said earlier), he loves her "because" ("I Love You Because").

== Songs ==
Act I

- "Another Saturday Night in New York" – Company
- "Oh What a Difference" – Austin and Jeff
- "The Actuary Song" – Marcy and Diana
- "...But I Don't Want to Talk About Her" – Austin and Marcy
- "Coffee" – Marcy and Austin
- "The Perfect Romance" – New York Man and New York Woman
- "Because of You" – Austin and Marcy
- "We're Just Friends" – Diana and Jeff
- "Maybe We Just Made Love" – Austin
- "Just Not Now" – Marcy

Act II

- "Alone" – Marcy, New York Man and New York Woman
- "That's What's Gonna Happen" – Jeff, Austin, New York Man and Diana
- "Even Though" – Marcy
- "But I Do" – Austin, Jeff, Marcy and Diana
- "What Do We Do It For?" – New York Man, New York Woman, Marcy and Diana
- "Marcy's Yours" – Diana, Jeff and Austin
- "Goodbye" – Austin
- "I Love You Because" – Austin and Company
