= Jason Robert Brown =

American songwriter

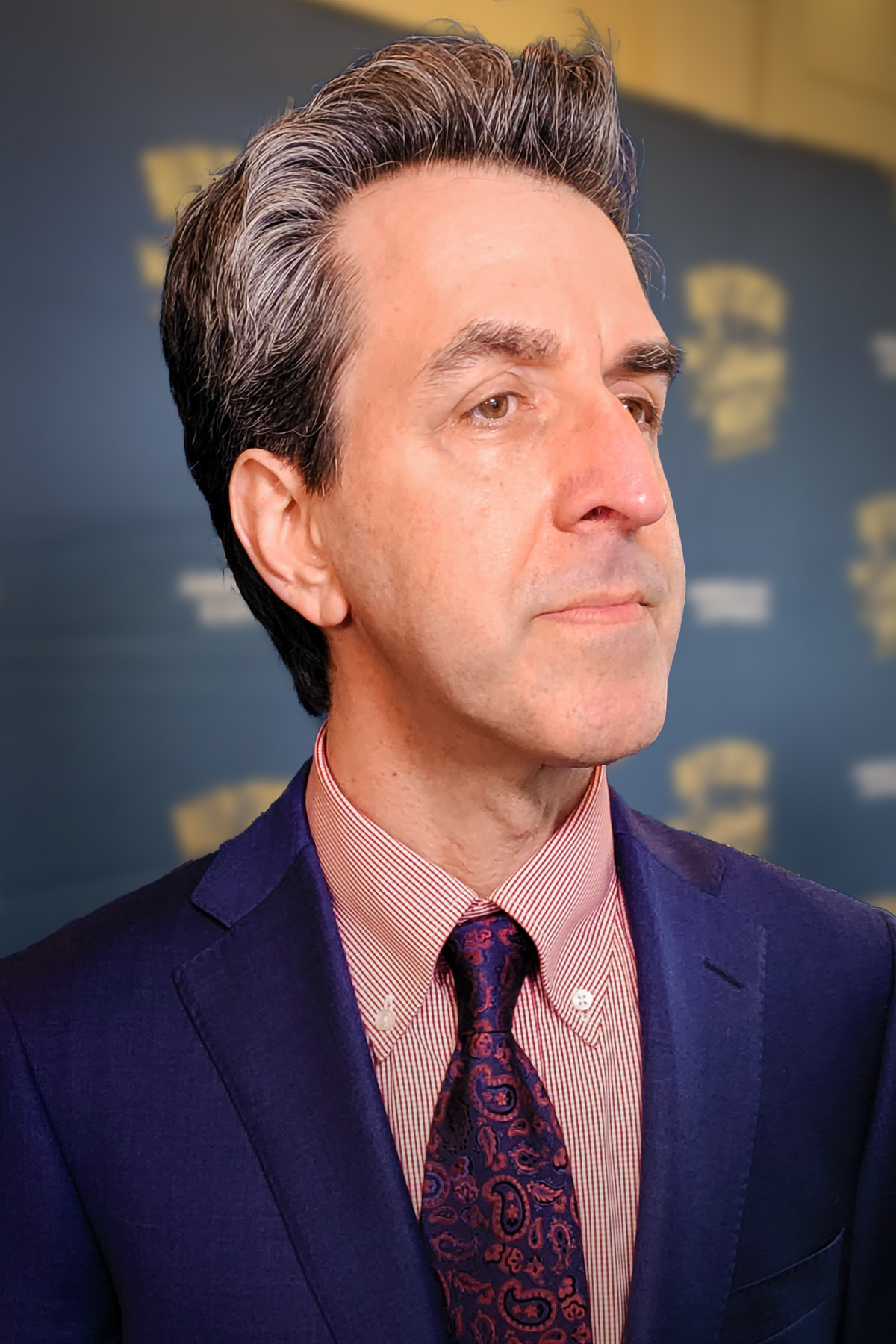
- Brown in 2022

Background information
- Born: June 20, 1970 (age 56); Ossining, New York, United States
- Genres: Musical theatre
- Occupations: Composer, lyricist, playwright
- Years active: 1985–present
- Spouse: Georgia Stitt (m. 2003)
- Website: jasonrobertbrown.com

Jason Robert Brown (born June 20, 1970) is an American musical theatre composer, lyricist, and playwright. Brown's music sensibility fuses pop-rock stylings with theatrical lyrics. He is the recipient of three Tony Awards for his work on Parade and The Bridges of Madison County.

== Career ==
Brown grew up in the suburbs of New York City, and attended the Eastman School of Music in Rochester, New York for 2 years, rooming with fellow student, and vocalist, Christopher Mooney. During summer, he attended French Woods Festival of the Performing Arts in Hancock, New York. He said Sweeney Todd: The Demon Barber of Fleet Street and Sunday in the Park with George were two of his biggest influences, and had it not been for them, he would have joined a rock band and tried to be Billy Joel.

He began his career in New York City as an arranger, conductor, and pianist, working on shows such as William Finn's A New Brain, and playing at several nightclubs and piano bars in the city. Songs for a New World marked the first major New York production of Brown's songs. An off-Broadway revue with a limited run, the show was directed by Daisy Prince, daughter of director/producer Hal Prince, and featured the 25-year-old Brown's pop-rock-influenced music. The song "Stars and the Moon" has since become a cabaret standard, and is probably Brown's best-known composition to date.

Brown was subsequently hired to write songs for the Broadway musical Parade, based on the trial and lynching of Leo Frank, after meeting Hal Prince. Parade, directed by Prince and with a book by Alfred Uhry, won Brown the 1999 Tony Award for Best Original Score. During this production, Livent, one of the producers of Parade, pulled out after reviews were not as positive as they'd hoped. RCA Victor, the other major producer, decided it would pull out as well. Brown said of the event in 1999, "Livent dropped out shortly after the reviews came out. They announced they would not spend another dime on the show. RCA had an agreement to record all of Livent's shows. But when Livent pulled out of 'Parade,' the RCA higher-ups said they were pulling out, too. I had to go to Billy Rosenfield and ask him: 'What if we pay for this record and you just distribute it?' Billy said, 'Sure.'" Brown had to try to scrounge money from every corner, "In the end, RCA put in $25,000, Lincoln Center put in a big chunk, around $200,000, including the producer Scott Rudin's $25,000, and there was a contribution from the Gilman and Gonzalez-Falla foundation, which has helped support a lot of musical theatre composers over the years, of $40,000. Even Roy Furman, the new guy at Livent, gave us a little money. Somehow, we pulled it together." Livent also was struggling at the time because the company had mishandled funds while applying for bankruptcy protection.

Brown went back to working with Daisy Prince for his third major show The Last Five Years, for which he wrote the book as well as songs. Inspired by his own failed first marriage, the show is a two-person musical that tells the history of a relationship from two different perspectives. The male's narrative begins at the beginning of the story and progresses through marriage, infidelity, and divorce, while the female narrative begins at the end of the relationship and ends with the couple's first date; the two actors' only direct interaction takes place midpoint, during the wedding sequence. The original Chicago cast consisted of Norbert Leo Butz and Lauren Kennedy, with Sherie Rene Scott over the New York run. The Last Five Years received mixed critical reviews and was not a commercial success, lasting only two months off-Broadway, although Brown garnered 2 Drama Desk Awards for music and lyrics. Additionally, due to the cast recording featuring Scott and Butz, the show has gained popularity among contemporary musical theatre aficionados and is an oft-performed piece in regional and community theatres. A film version of the show, featuring Anna Kendrick and Jeremy Jordan, was released in February 2015.

Brown contributed several songs to the Broadway flop Urban Cowboy. He had worked as an orchestrator with director Phillip Oesterman on the Off-Broadway musical New York Rock, and Oesterman called on him to help him out with Urban Cowboy. Urban Cowboy had been denied the use of the Clint Black catalog, and Brown came in and wrote a few songs (with help from director Lonny Price, who replaced Oesterman after he died). The show was nominated, with 30 other composers, for the 2003 Tony Award for Best Musical Score, losing out to Hairspray.

In June 2005, Brown released a solo album, entitled Wearing Someone Else's Clothes.

In December 2005, his Chanukah Suite received its world premiere with two performances by the Los Angeles Master Chorale at the Walt Disney Concert Hall.

He also teaches courses in musical theatre performance and composition at the University of Southern California. Brown is an active performer of his own work, singing and playing the piano with or without his band, the Caucasian Rhythm Kings (Gary Sieger, guitar, and Randy Landau, bass).

Brown's tween-oriented musical 13 premiered at the Mark Taper Forum in Los Angeles, CA on January 7, 2007. It opened on Broadway October 5, 2008, at the Bernard B. Jacobs Theatre, and closed on January 4, 2009. The film adaptation, retitled 13: The Musical, was released in August 2022.

His Bridges of Madison County, a musical adaption of Robert James Waller's 1992 novel with a book by Marsha Norman premiered at the Williamstown Theatre Festival on August 1, 2013. Directed by Bartlett Sher, the cast featured Elena Shaddow as Francesca and Steven Pasquale. The musical opened on Broadway on February 27, 2014, at the Gerald Schoenfeld Theatre, starring Kelli O'Hara as Francesca. The show closed on May 18, 2014, but Brown went on to win Tony Awards for Best Original Score and Best Orchestrations.

Brown wrote the music for the 2022 musical, Mr. Saturday Night with lyrics by Amanda Green and a book by Billy Crystal, Lowell Ganz & Babaloo Mandel. Brown was nominated for best score at the 2022 Tony Awards.

According to Brown, Bree Lowdermilk used to be an assistant to him. In 2010, Brown publicized his personal efforts to discourage the unauthorized online sharing of his copyrighted sheet music via an e-mail conversation with a teenager named Eleanor.

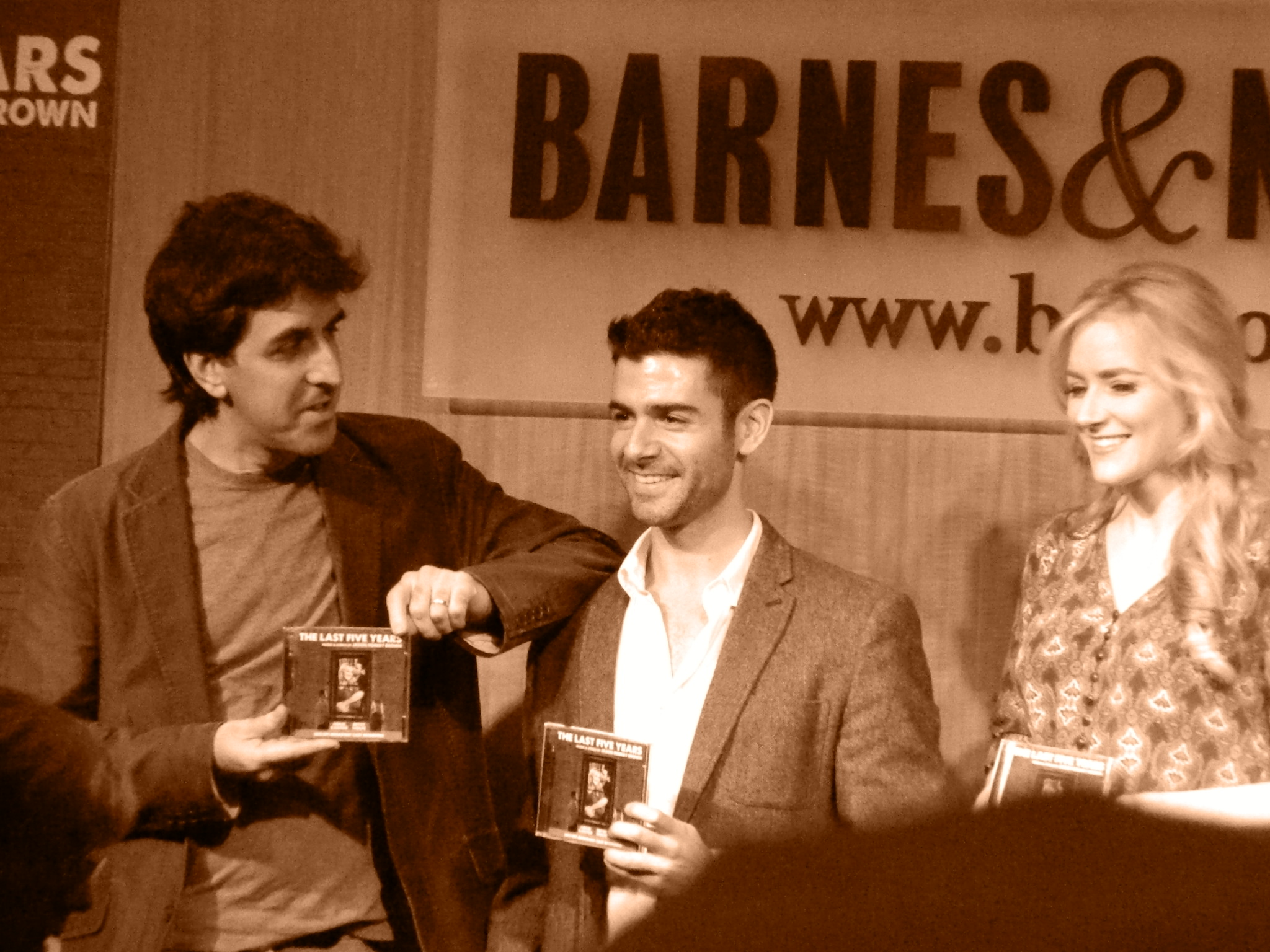
Brown at a 2013 CD signing with Adam Kantor and Betsy Wolfe, the cast of the 2013 off-Broadway revival of The Last Five Years.

As of 2020, Brown was working on a musical adaptation of Farewell My Concubine. He is also working on a musical adaptation of Midnight in the Garden of Good and Evil.

== Musical style ==
Brown has many trademarks in his composing style, which is often rhythmically dynamic and harmonically unconventional, calling for a wide vocal range. His lyric writing often includes internal rhymes, and his music is composed of melodic phrases which do not adhere to a predictable 4-measure length. He favors songs written in AABA' form, with some exceptions to this form in his show Parade. Perhaps most characteristic are his love duets; all five ("I'd Give it All for You" from Songs for a New World, "All the Wasted Time" from Parade, "The Next Ten Minutes" from The Last Five Years, "Tell Her" from 13, and "One Second And A Million Miles" from The Bridges of Madison County) are written in a very distinct format: male-female-both, compound time in the duet section (two using hemiola), and four of the five end with the couple singing the same pitch.

In 2005, Brown was cited by Mark Shenton as one of the leading new theatrical composers (a list that includes Michael John LaChiusa, Adam Guettel, Andrew Lippa, and Jeanine Tesori, among others).

== Personal life ==
Brown was born in Ossining, New York. He is Jewish. He was previously married to Theresa O'Neill, and their failed marriage inspired his musical The Last Five Years. Since 2003, Brown has been married to fellow composer Georgia Stitt. Together, they have two daughters.

== Major works ==
=== Musical theatre ===
- Songs for a New World – Ran Off-Broadway at the WPA Theatre, October 11 – November 5, 1995. Also conducted, played piano, and sang one line in the last song. The show was revived at New York City Center for four nights in June 2018.
- Parade – Ran on Broadway at the Vivian Beaumont Theater at Lincoln Center from December 17, 1998 to February 28, 1999. Brown won the Tony Award for Best Score, and a Drama Desk Award for Best Music. He also plays piano on the cast recording. In 2023, the New York City Center production transferred to Broadway, running at the Bernard B. Jacobs Theatre, and later won the Tony Award for Best Revival of a Musical.
- The Last Five Years – Premiered at Chicago's Northlight Theatre in 2001. Ran Off-Broadway at the Minetta Theatre from March 3, 2002 to May 5, 2002, starring Norbert Leo Butz and Sherie Rene Scott, and directed by Daisy Prince. Brown won Drama Desk Awards for Best Music and Best Lyrics, and was nominated for Outstanding Orchestrations. He also wrote the book, conducted, and played piano. The show had an Off-Broadway Revival in 2013 at Second Stage Theatre, starring Adam Kantor and Betsy Wolfe, and directed by Brown. In 2014, a film-adaptation was released, starring Anna Kendrick and Jeremy Jordan. A Broadway production was announced to open in 2025, starring Nick Jonas and Adrienne Warren, directed by Whitney White.
- Urban Cowboy – Ran on Broadway from March 27, 2003 to May 18, 2003. Tony-Nominated for Best Original Score. Brown contributed five songs to the score of the musical. Also orchestrated, arranged, music directed, conducted, played keyboards, and sang.
- 13 – Premiered January 7, 2007, at the Mark Taper Forum in Los Angeles, California and subsequently opened on Broadway at the Bernard B. Jacobs Theatre, running from October 5, 2008 to January 4, 2009 after 22 previews and 105 regular performances. A film adaptation was released on Netflix in 2022.
- The Bridges of Madison County – Stage adaptation of the novel, with a book by Marsha Norman. The musical played an out-of-town tryout at the Williamstown Theatre Festival in August 2013. It opened on Broadway at the Gerald Schoenfeld Theatre on January 17, 2014 (in previews) and officially on February 20, 2014. The production closed on May 18, 2014 after 137 performances due to low ticket sales. He won two 2014 Tony Awards, one for Best Original Score and one for Best Orchestrations.
- Honeymoon in Vegas – Stage adaptation of the film of the same name, with the book written by Andrew Bergman. The show was originally scheduled to premiere in Toronto in November 2012, but the run was canceled. Instead, the show had its out-of-town tryout at the Paper Mill Playhouse starring Tony Danza and Rob McClure with performances from September 26, 2013 to October 17th, 2013. The Broadway production, also starring Danza and McClure, opened at the Nederlander Theatre on January 15, 2015, before closing on April 5, 2015, due to insufficient ticket sales.
- Mr. Saturday Night – Stage adaptation of the 1992 film of the same name starring Billy Crystal who also starred in the musical version. Brown wrote the score and collaborated on the lyrics with Amanda Green. It premiered at the Nederlander Theatre on March 29, 2022. The show concluded its Broadway run on September 4, 2022
- The Connector – Ran Off-Broadway at MCC Theater from January 12, 2024 to March 17, 2024, this new musical tells the story of two journalists in the late 1990s, "pitting ambition against values in the race for the ultimate scoop." The musical was conceived and directed by Daisy Prince with a book by Jonathan Marc Sherman. The Off Broadway production stars Scott Bakula and features Brown conducting and playing the piano.
- Midnight in the Garden of Good and Evil – Stage adaptation of the non-fiction novel of the same name by John Berendt. World premiere production premiered at Chicago's Goodman Theatre, from June 25, 2024 and closed on August 11th, 2024. The show features music and lyrics by Brown, book by Taylor Mac, and direction by Rob Ashford.

=== Solo albums ===
- Wearing Someone Else's Clothes – 2005 – Brown's solo debut album, composed entirely of tracks which were previously unreleased, some of which were cut songs from shows or written for shows which were never finished, and some of which were written as stand-alone songs for the album. The album features his vocals and compositions on every song, and his arrangements and musicianship on almost every track.
- How We React and How We Recover – A second solo album, recorded from May–December 2017, features songs developed at his monthly Subculture concert residency in New York. The album was released June 29, 2018 by Sh-K-Boom/Ghostlight Records.
- Coming From Inside The House (A Virtual SubCulture Concert) – A third solo album, featuring vocals by Shoshana Bean, Ariana Grande, and Brown's wife and daughters. It was recorded on April 27, 2020 for the one-night video streaming event to benefit the SubCulture staff and musicians from the Jason Robert Brown Artist-in-Residence concerts, during the COVID-19 pandemic. It was released worldwide on December 18, 2020 by Craft Recordings.

== Other works ==
- Chanukah Suite – 2005 – an 8-minute chorale fanfare in three parts, featuring traditional Hebrew songs infused with up-tempo rock and roll rhythms and Leonard Bernstein inspired chordal flavors.
- "Jason's Song (Gave It Away)" – When Brown was in L.A. for a couple of weeks, Ariana Grande asked him to write a song for a new album. Since they worked together before (in the original Broadway cast of 13), Brown agreed to help. Months later, their track was released on Grande's extended edition of Dangerous Woman.
- The Waverly Gallery – Off-Broadway run from March 22, 2000 to May 21, 2000 at the Promenade Theatre. Play by Kenneth Lonergan, with music by Brown.
- John and Jen – Orchestrations
- A New Brain – Vocal arrangements/additional musician
- Wonder Pets!– Composer
- New York Rock – Orchestrations
- The Trumpet of the Swan, 2011 – Composer and conductor for stage adaptation by Marsha Norman commissioned by the John F. Kennedy Center for the Performing Arts

== Awards and nominations ==
Year	Award	Category	Work	Result
1999	Tony Award	Best Original Score	Parade	Won
1999	Drama Desk Award	Outstanding New Musical	Parade	Won
1999	Drama Desk Award	Outstanding Music	Parade	Won
1999	Drama Desk Award	Outstanding Lyrics	Parade	Nominated
1999	New York Drama Critics' Circle Award	Best Musical	Parade	Won
2002	Drama Desk Award	Outstanding Music	The Last Five Years	Won
2002	Drama Desk Award	Outstanding Lyrics	The Last Five Years	Won
2002	Drama Desk Award	Outstanding Orchestrations	The Last Five Years	Nominated
2003	Tony Award	Best Original Score	Urban Cowboy	Nominated
2009	Drama Desk Award	Outstanding Lyrics	13	Nominated
2014	Tony Award	Best Original Score	The Bridges of Madison County	Won
2014	Tony Award	Best Orchestrations	The Bridges of Madison County	Won
2014	Drama Desk Awards	Outstanding Music	The Bridges of Madison County	Won
2014	Drama Desk Awards	Outstanding Lyrics	The Bridges of Madison County	Nominated
2014	Drama Desk Awards	Outstanding Orchestrations	The Bridges of Madison County	Won
2014	Outer Critics Circle Award	Outstanding New Score	The Bridges of Madison County	Won
2015	Drama Desk Award	Outstanding Music	Honeymoon in Vegas	Nominated
2015	Drama Desk Award	Outstanding Lyrics	Honeymoon in Vegas	Nominated
2015	Drama Desk Award	Outstanding Orchestrations	Honeymoon in Vegas	Nominated
2022	Tony Award	Best Original Score	Mr. Saturday Night	Nominated

== Recordings ==
Original cast recordings were made for Songs for a New World, Parade, The Last Five Years, 13, The Bridges of Madison County, and Honeymoon in Vegas. "Stars and the Moon" has been recorded many times, including on Audra McDonald's Way Back to Paradise and Betty Buckley's Stars and the Moon: Live at the Donmar.

Actress Lauren Kennedy, who originated the role of Cathy in the Chicago production of The Last Five Years, released Songs of Jason Robert Brown, featuring Brown's compositions from his previous shows, as well as several previously unreleased songs.
