= The Last Five Years =

2001 musical by Jason Robert Brown

- Original Off-Broadway playbill
- Music: Jason Robert Brown
- Lyrics: Jason Robert Brown
- Book: Jason Robert Brown
- Premiere: May 23, 2001: Northlight Theatre
- Productions: 2001 Chicago; 2002 Off-Broadway; 2013 Off-Broadway revival 2015 Ireland; 2016 Off-West End; 2021 West End; 2025 Broadway
- Awards: Drama Desk Award for Outstanding Music; Drama Desk Award for Outstanding Lyrics

The Last Five Years is a musical written by Jason Robert Brown. It premiered at Chicago's Northlight Theatre in 2001 and was then produced Off-Broadway in March 2002. Since then it has had numerous productions, both in the United States and internationally, and a Broadway production in 2025.

The story explores a five-year relationship between Jamie Wellerstein, a rising novelist, and Cathy Hiatt, a struggling actress. The show uses a form of storytelling in which Jamie's story is told in chronological order (starting just after the couple have first met) and Cathy's story is told in reverse chronological order (beginning the show at the end of the marriage). The characters do not directly interact except for a wedding song in the middle as their timelines intersect.

In 2014, a film adaptation directed by Richard LaGravenese starring Anna Kendrick and Jeremy Jordan was released.

== Background ==
The Last Five Years was inspired by Brown's failed marriage to Theresa O'Neill. O'Neill sued Brown on the grounds that the story of the musical violated non-disparagement and non-disclosure agreements within their divorce decree by representing her relationship with Brown too closely. Brown, in turn, sued O'Neill for interfering with his creative work and his creative process. As part of the legal settlement for both suits, Brown removed all references to Cathy being Irish Catholic, and changed the song "I Could Be in Love With Someone Like You" to "Shiksa Goddess" in order to reduce the similarity between the character and O'Neill.

== Synopsis ==
Cathy is sitting alone lamenting the end of her marriage ("Still Hurting").

Five years earlier, Jamie has just met Cathy. He is overjoyed that, for the first time in his life, he is in a romantic relationship with a non-Jewish woman. ("Shiksa Goddess").

Cathy and Jamie are in Ohio but not together. It is her birthday, and he has come to visit her as she works in a show there ("See I'm Smiling"). She is anxious to fix any problems in their marriage but she becomes angry when Jamie tells her he has to go back early to New York. During breaks in the music, we see a younger Jamie, talking to a literary agent about his book.

Jamie is moving in with Cathy. He comments on how lucky he is that everything is going right for him; his book is being published and his life with Cathy seems too good to be true ("Moving Too Fast"). Meanwhile, an older Cathy is making a call to her agent; it seems her career is not going the way she planned it.

Cathy is attending Jamie's book party. She sings about how he ignores her for his writing but she will always be in love with him ("I'm a Part of That").

Jamie and Cathy celebrate their second Christmas. He tells her a new story he has written about an old tailor named Schmuel and he gives her a Christmas present: a watch, promising to support her as she follows her dreams of acting. ("The Schmuel Song").

Cathy is in Ohio and writing to Jamie. She describes to Jamie her disappointing life in Ohio among her eccentric colleagues ("A Summer in Ohio").

Jamie is sitting with Cathy in Central Park. Jamie proposes to her and, for the first time in the musical, they sing together ("The Next Ten Minutes"). They get married, exchanging vows to stay together forever.

Jamie is facing temptation from other women, especially now that his career as a writer has escalated ("A Miracle Would Happen"). Cathy, meanwhile, is auditioning for a role ("When You Come Home to Me"). She is feeling depressed because of the rejection she is facing in her acting career, and she complains to Jamie about it ("Climbing Uphill").

Jamie speaks to Cathy on the phone, trying to convince her that there is nothing going on with him and his editor, Elise. He wants to celebrate a book review, but Cathy refuses to go out.

Jamie is fighting with Cathy, trying to get her to listen to him. He accuses her of being unsupportive of his career just because hers is failing. Though his words are harsh, he promises her that he believes in her ("If I Didn't Believe in You").

A younger Cathy is in the car with Jamie, who is going to meet her parents. She tells him about her past relationships and hopes not to end up in a small town life like her friend from high school ("I Can Do Better Than That"). She asks Jamie to move in with her.

Near the end of the relationship, Jamie wakes up beside another woman ("Nobody Needs to Know"). He tries to defend his actions and blames Cathy for destroying his privacy and their relationship. Jamie promises not to lie to this woman and tells her that "I could be in love with someone like you," just as he said to Cathy in "Shiksa Goddess".

Cathy is ecstatic after her first date with Jamie. She sings goodbye ("Goodbye Until Tomorrow"). She proclaims that she has been waiting for Jamie her whole life. Simultaneously but five years forward, Jamie sits in their shared apartment writing laments over the relationship ("I Could Never Rescue You"). As Cathy waves Jamie "goodbye until tomorrow", Jamie wishes Cathy simply "goodbye".

== Music ==
"The Next Ten Minutes"
The duet between Jamie and Cathy in "The Next Ten Minutes", as performed by Sherie Rene Scott and Norbert Leo Butz on the 2002 Off-Broadway cast recording.

The musical style draws on a number of musical genres, including pop, jazz, classical, Klezmer, Latin, Blues, Rock, and Folk. The orchestration consists of piano, acoustic guitar, fretless bass, two cellos, one doubling on celesta and tubular bell, and violin, doubling cymbal.

- "Still Hurting" - Cathy
- "Shiksa Goddess" - Jamie
- "See I'm Smiling" - Cathy
- "Moving Too Fast" - Jamie
- "A Part of That" - Cathy
- "The Schmuel Song" - Jamie
- "A Summer in Ohio" - Cathy
- "The Next Ten Minutes" - Jamie & Cathy
- "A Miracle Would Happen/When You Come Home to Me" - Jamie/Cathy
- "Climbing Uphill/Audition Sequence" - Cathy
- "If I Didn't Believe in You" - Jamie
- "I Can Do Better Than That" - Cathy
- "Nobody Needs to Know" - Jamie
- "Goodbye Until Tomorrow/I Could Never Rescue You" - Jamie & Cathy

=== Cast album ===
The Last Five Years cast album was released by Sh-K-Boom Records in April 2002.

== Casts ==
Character	Chicago	Off-Broadway	Off-Broadway Revival	Town Hall NYC Concert	Off-West End	West End	Broadway	25th Anniversary Concert Tour
Character	2001	2002	2013	2016		2021	2025	2026
Jamie Wellerstein	Norbert Leo Butz	Norbert Leo Butz	Adam Kantor	Joshua Henry	Jonathan Bailey	Oli Higginson	Nick Jonas	Ben Platt
Cathy Hiatt	Lauren Kennedy	Sherie Rene Scott	Betsy Wolfe	Cynthia Erivo	Samantha Barks	Molly Lynch	Adrienne Warren	Rachel Zegler

== Production history ==
=== Chicago (2001) ===
The show debuted at Northlight Theatre in Skokie, Illinois, in 2001, running from May 23 – July 1. The production starred Lauren Kennedy as Cathy and Norbert Leo Butz as Jamie.

=== Off-Broadway (2002) ===
The show opened Off-Broadway at the Minetta Theatre on March 2, 2002, and closed May 5, 2002, directed by Harold Prince's daughter, Daisy Prince, with Butz again starring alongside Sherie Rene Scott. (Kennedy was unable to reprise her role due to taking a role in South Pacific in London.) The production won the 2002 Drama Desk Award for Outstanding Music and Lyrics, as well as receiving Drama Desk nominations for Outstanding Musical, Outstanding Actor, Outstanding Actress, Outstanding Orchestrations, and Outstanding Set Design. It also received the Lucille Lortel Award nomination for Outstanding Musical and Outstanding Actor, and the Outer Critics Circle Award nomination for Outstanding Off-Broadway Musical.

=== Off-Broadway revival (2013) ===
The show was revived in 2013 Off-Broadway at the Second Stage Theater for a limited engagement with Adam Kantor and Betsy Wolfe in the roles of Jamie and Cathy, respectively. Brown himself directed. In March 2015, Kantor and Wolfe reprised their roles in a two-night-only concert production of the show at the American Conservatory Theater in San Francisco.

=== Off-West End (2016) ===
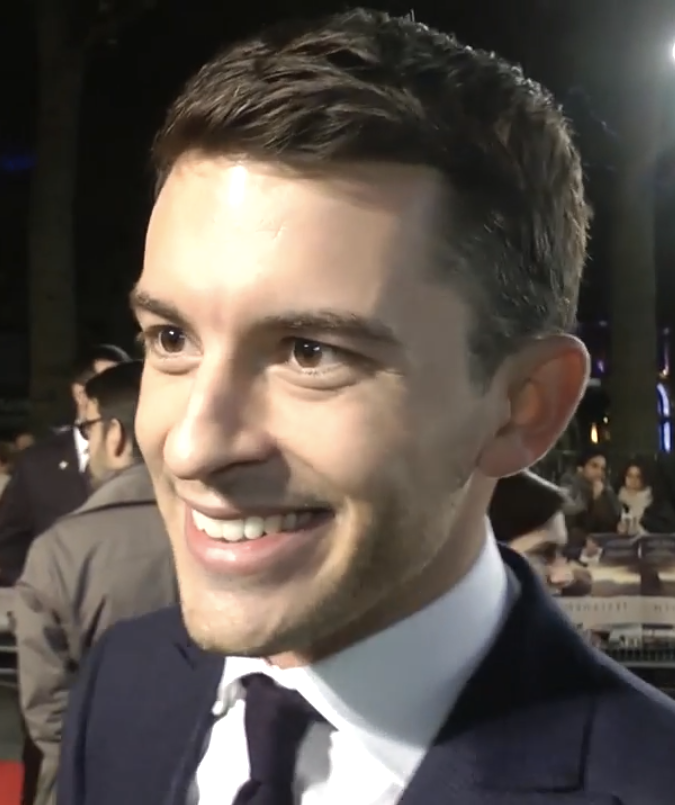
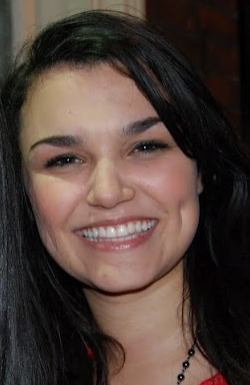
Jonathan Bailey and Samantha Barks headlined the acclaimed Off-West End revival of the musical directed by Jason Robert Brown in 2016.

The 2016 production was headlined by Jonathan Bailey as Jamie and Samantha Barks as Cathy at St. James Theatre, with direction by Brown himself. The Stage's Mark Shenton called the production "poignant" turning "each song into a masterclass of storytelling" with Bailey "a real vocal surprise with his haunting renditions of 'If I Didn't Believe in You' and 'Nobody Needs to Know'." Edward Seckerson of The Arts Desk called the production a "knockout" and a "two-handed tour-de-force" in his five-star review.

It won the WhatsOnStage Award for Best Off-West End Production in 2017. A video of Bailey's audition singing "If I Didn't Believe In You" was uploaded on YouTube in 2017, and has since gone viral.

=== West End (2021) ===
An actor-musician production opened in February 2020 to four and five star reviews at Southwark Playhouse and was closed due to the COVID-19 pandemic. It transferred for a four-week run at the Garrick Theatre in London's West End between 17 September-17 to October 17, 2021 starring Oli Higginson and Molly Lynch.

=== Broadway (2025) ===
A production opened on Broadway at the Hudson Theatre in early 2025, starring Nick Jonas as Jamie and Adrienne Warren as Cathy, with Whitney White directing and Jeff and Rick Kuperman choreographing. The limited run began in previews on March 18, 2025, before opening on April 6. The orchestrations for the production were expanded with more strings and a drummer/percussionist added.

Reviews were mixed to negative, with most critics praising Warren but criticizing Jonas's performance and White's direction. Jesse Green at The New York Times called Warren "resplendent" and Jonas "underpowered", writing, "the structure (along with the balance) has been compromised. The production ... muddies the show’s temporal ironies and flattens its emotional topography". Johnny Oleksinski for New York Post commented: "Audiences always deserve clarity, but The Last Five Years must be especially well-defined in its staging and performances, since the weird structure is jarring to the uninitiated". The production received a Drama League Award nomination for Outstanding Revival of a Musical, while Jonas and Warren each receiving nominations for Outstanding Performance. The production closed on June 22, 2025, after 19 previews and 89 regular performances.

=== 25th Anniversary Concert Tour (2026) ===
Ben Platt and Rachel Zegler starred in the 25th anniversary concert production of the show in various performances from March 24 to April 7, 2026, directed and conducted by Jason Robert Brown at the London Palladium, Hollywood Bowl, and Radio City Music Hall.

=== Other productions ===
- The Last Five Years had its international debut in Manila, Philippines, in 2003 with Menchu Lauchengco-Yulo and Audie Gemora, and again in 2014 with Nikki Gil and Joaquin Pedro Valdes. Asian Premiere Theatre Fans Manila
- The show had its Danish premiere March 8, 2012, at Fredericia Teater. The production was directed by Daniel Bohr and starred Lars Mølsted as Jamie and Maria Skuladottir as Cathy.
- The show premiered in Paris, France, in 2013 presented by American Musical Theatre Live featuring Jonathan Wagner as Jamie and Miranda Crispin as Cathy.
- The show was given its Northern Irish premiere at The Lyric Theatre, Belfast in 2015, running for a limited engagement. It starred Fra Fee as Jamie and Amy Lennox as Cathy. The production was directed by Stephen Whitson.
- The show premiered in Stockholm, Sweden, at Teaterstudio Lederman in April 2018. It starred Emil Nyström as Jamie and Cilla Silvia as Cathy. The production was directed by Robin Karlsson, with music direction by Johan Mörk.
- In 2018, the show premiered in São Paulo, Brazil, at Teatro Viradalata in its first season (2018), and at Teatro Nair Bello in its second season (2019). In 2023, the show returns for its third season in Brazil, at Teatro Nair Bello. The production was made by H. Produções Culturais, Lumus Entretenimento and Andarilho Filmes. "Os Últimos 5 anos" (PT-BR title) was directed by João Fonseca, with music direction by Thiago Gimenes, starring Beto Sargentelli as Jaimie Wellerstein and Eline Porto as Cathy Hyatt in all of its three seasons. The Brazilian production also won several awards and nominations in the most important awards of the genre in Brazil, including "Best Actor", "Best Actress" and "Best Musical".
- The show premiered in Basel, Switzerland, presented by Boutique Theatre Basel in June 2019. It starred Anthony Hehir as Jamie and Sarah Madeleine as Cathy. The production was directed by Susan Brownfield and choreographed by Gara Roda.
- On September 12, 2016, Jason Robert Brown, along with SubCulture, presented a one-night-only benefit for the Brady Center to prevent gun violence. The Town Hall in New York City hosted this event. Cynthia Erivo played Cathy, and Joshua Henry played Jamie. Jason Robert Brown conducted the orchestra.
- In June 2019, the musical was directed by Jason Alexander in a production in Syracuse, New York. Alexander introduced two dancers who shadow the characters of Jamie and Cathy; reviewer Linda Lowen wrote, "With approval from Brown, Alexander's vision has resulted in a production more interactive, more compelling, more visual, and more suited to those twenty-something millennials who -- like Jamie and Cathy -- grapple with love, career, independence and commitment."
- A 20th anniversary concert with Norbert Leo Butz and Lauren Kennedy accompanied by Jason Robert Brown took place in May 2021, online via YouTube.
- In autumn 2022, the original English version of the musical opened in Freiburg im Breisgau (Germany), starring Gabriela Ryffel and Calum Melville. The production was directed by Natalia Voskoboynikova.
- In June 2023, Barefoot Theatre Collaborative announced that the musical would be staged on September 29-October 15, 2023, to be directed by Topper Fabregas, with musical direction by Rony Fortich. The musical will star Gab Pangilinan as Cathy and Myke Salomon as Jamie. Both stars starred too in a hit Filipino musical, Mula Sa Buwan's run last August - September, December 2022.
- In Spain, this musical has been in stage four times, the first three times has been in Barcelona in Catalan. The first time was in March 2006 with Xavier Thió and Elena Martinell, the second time was in January 2009 with Daniel Anglés and Pilar Capellades, and the three time was in 2011 with Daniel Anglés and Julie Atherton, and she sang in English,. In March 2025 this musical came for the first time to Madrid and it was translated to Spanish by the director, Guillermo Sabariegos. Bea Carnicero and Paloma Alvargonzález are alternating the role of Cathy and Francis García and Borja del Real in the role of Jamie.
- Jyväskylä City Theatre, Finland, premiere at September 25, 2025. Directed by Anssi Valtonen, musically directed by Lasse Hirvi, and starring Sami Ulmanen as Jamie and Emmi Nieminen as Cathy.

== Film adaptation ==
An adaptation starring Anna Kendrick and Jeremy Jordan was directed by P.S. I Love You director Richard LaGravenese. The film premiered at the 2014 Toronto International Film Festival and had a limited release in theatres in 2015. It received mixed to positive reviews; the review aggregator website Rotten Tomatoes reported a 59% approval rating.

== Awards and nominations ==
=== Chicago production ===
Year	Award	Category	Nominee	Result	Ref.
2001	Jeff Awards	Best New Work		Nominated	
2001	Jeff Awards	Best Actor in a Principal Role in a Musical	Norbert Leo Butz	Nominated	
2001	Jeff Awards	Best Musical Direction	Tom Murray	Nominated	

=== Original Off-Broadway production ===
Year	Award	Category	Nominee	Result	Ref.
2002	Drama Desk Award	Outstanding Musical		Nominated	
2002	Drama Desk Award	Outstanding Actress in a Musical	Sherie Rene Scott	Nominated	
2002	Drama Desk Award	Outstanding Actor in a Musical	Norbert Leo Butz	Nominated	
2002	Drama Desk Award	Outstanding Music	Jason Robert Brown	Won	
2002	Drama Desk Award	Outstanding Lyrics	Jason Robert Brown	Won	
2002	Drama Desk Award	Outstanding Orchestrations	Jason Robert Brown	Nominated	
2002	Drama Desk Award	Set Design of a Musical	Beowulf Boritt	Nominated	
2002	Lucille Lortel Award	Outstanding Musical		Nominated	
2002	Lucille Lortel Award	Outstanding Actor in a Musical	Norbert Leo Butz	Nominated	
2002	Outer Critics Circle Award	Outstanding New Off-Broadway Musical		Nominated	

=== 2016 Off West End production ===
Year	Award	Category	Nominee	Result	Ref.
2017	WhatsOnStage Awards	Best Off-West End Production		Won	

=== 2021 West End production ===
Year	Award	Category	Nominee	Result	Ref.
2022	WhatsOnStage Award	Best Musical Direction	Leo Munby	Nominated	
2022	WhatsOnStage Award	Best Sound Design	Adam Fisher	Nominated	
2022	WhatsOnStage Award	Best Off-West End Production		Nominated	

=== 2025 Broadway production ===
Year	Award	Category	Nominee	Result	Ref.
2025	Drama League Awards	Outstanding Revival of a Musical		Nominated	
2025	Drama League Awards	Distinguished Performance	Nick Jonas	Nominated	
2025	Drama League Awards	Distinguished Performance	Adrienne Warren	Nominated	
