= Anna Hanika =

- Born: June 27, 1903; Vienna, Austria-Hungary
- Died: March 14, 1988 (aged 84); Vienna, Austria

Anna Hanika (27 June 1903 - 14 March 1988) was an Austrian accounts clerk who became a resistance activist during the Nazi years.

== Early life and World War II ==
Anna Hanika was born in Vienna, the youngest of her parents' three recorded children. Therese and Karl Hanika's family was unusually spread out in terms of the children's ages. When Anna was born, her brother Anton was 18 and her sister Joanna was 12. Her mother was 48. Anna's father died when she was six. The duration of her schooling was restricted to the minimum required by law in order that she might devote herself to the care of her widowed mother. When World War I ended in 1918, the family's savings had been destroyed by the economic destruction of the previous four years. Anna's elder sister Johanna became a Carmelite nun. Anna was also a committed Roman Catholic, but she stayed on at home to look after her mother. From 1923, she provided for the family by working as an accounting clerk with the Christian-Socialist Trades Union of Service Workers. After the institution ceased to exist in 1938, she took similar work with a German-owned ball-bearing manufacturer.

At work she came into contact with people who later because operatives and members of Austrian Resistance groups which would emerge after 1938 under the leadership of Jacob Kastelic, Karl Lederer and Roman Scholz. She also acquired a fiancé, a deputy inspector with the Vienna Electricity Company, Rudolf Wallner. It was at the end of 1939 that she was persuaded by Wallner to become a member of the “Greater Austria Liberation Movement” (“Großösterreichische Freiheitsbewegung”) which had been set up a year earlier in the wake of the 1938 annexation of Austria by Nazi Germany. The group's origins lay in a commitment to the creation of a separate "Danube federation", a catholic grouping of states in the Upper Danube region that would include Bavaria and Austria (as defined in the Treaty of Saint-Germain-en-Laye (1919)). As the oppressive nature of Nazi government became increasingly apparent, the movement became more simply an anti-government operation. It never numbered more than a few hundred members, but its existence threatened the Nazi state which was a one-party state.

Haniks's responsibilities in the group involved administration of membership fee collection and advertising it to potential new supporters. She recruited several members of her own social circle, including Margarete Skroch und Stefanie Wotraubek with whom she sang in the local church choir.

Since taking power in Germany at the start of 1933, the Nazis had become extremely adept at dealing with political opposition groups. The “Greater Austria Liberation Movement” was soon infiltrated by Otto Hartmann, a stage and movie actor who was a Gestapo spy. Hartmann's information enabled the Gestapo to "roll up" the group and, in July 1940, to arrest its three leaders, Jacob Kastelic, Karl Lederer and Roman Scholz. A month later, the lower tier of the group's activists was taken into custody "for investigation," including Anna Hanika. They were charged with "preparing to commit high treason" which was the standard charge under a wide range of such circumstances. Hanika was held in investigative custody for more than two and a half years, first in Krems and then in Vienna. Family members attempted, apparently without success, to have her released. However, on 10 March 1943 she was indeed released "on health grounds". Hanika had been caring for her increasingly dependent elderly mother, who died while she was still being held in detention by the authorities. When she was released she had indeed fallen seriously ill, and not able to work, which at least freed her up to take care of Gerhard Kastelic, the younger son of Jacob Kastelic whose own mother had died young, leaving the boy a semi-orphan without a mother and with a father in jail.

Several of Hanika's co-defendants were sentenced to death, including Karl Lederer, Alfred Miegl and her fiancé, Rudolf Wallner. Following her release Hanika was able to visit Wallner in his jail till 10 May 1944 when he was executed. She also took Gerhard Kastelic to visit his father till Jacob Kastelic's execution on 2 August 1944. Anna Hanika's own trial took place only on 3 March 1944. The special "People's Court" found her guilty, as charge, of preparing to commit high treason and sentenced her to a jail term. However, her period in investigative detention between 1940 and 1943 had exceeded the term of her sentence, which was accordingly determined to have been already served.

== Later life ==
When World War II ended in May 1945, Vienna was already occupied by allied forces. On her release from jail in 1943, Hanika had told her fellow activist Jacob Kastelic that she would keep an eye on his sons, and appears to have bought up the younger of them from her release in 1943. When the boys' aunt, Jacob's sister, died in 1954 she also adopted the older of them and brought them both as her own children, ensuring they received good educations at the Kollegium Kalksburg. Both boys later obtained doctorates in law.

In October 1945, with friends, she identified the bodies of her executed comrades at the Anatomy Institute and arranged their proper burial. In 1947 she appeared as a witness at the trial of Otto Hartmann, the Gestapo spy who had betrayed the activists in 1940.

Anna Hanika became an active member of the League of Nazi Victims ("Bund der politisch Verfolgten"): she devoted much time and effort to documenting the “Greater Austria Liberation Movement” and its members. She recorded her recollections of the death of Jacob Kastelic in a shocking written report. She was also active in other charitable enterprises, supporting missionary work in Africa by organising collections of medical supplies. During her final decades she was increasingly troubled by her longstanding heart problems, and in 1987 she moved into a retirement home run by nuns in Gumpendorf. Here, in March 1988, she died.
