= Adam Kantor =

American actor and singer (born 1986)

- Born: 27 May 1986 (age 40); Great Neck, Long Island
- Education: Northwestern University (BA)
- Occupations: Actor and singer
- Years active: 2008–present

Adam Kantor (born May 27, 1986) is an American actor and singer. He is best known for his roles on Broadway, most notably Mark Cohen in the closing cast of Rent, which was captured in Rent: Filmed Live on Broadway, Motel in the 2015 revival of Fiddler on the Roof, and as an original cast member in The Band's Visit.

== Biography ==
Kantor is from Great Neck, Long Island in New York, and describes himself as "a descendant of Jewish immigrants from Eastern Europe". He graduated from John L. Miller Great Neck North High School and Northwestern University, where he majored in theatre, in 2008. Soon after college, he landed a starring role, portraying Mark Cohen in the closing cast of the Broadway musical Rent, with the last performance made into a film, Rent: Filmed Live on Broadway. On Broadway, he has also appeared in the musical Next to Normal as an understudy and replacement for Henry.

He starred in the 2013 Off-Broadway revival of the musical The Last Five Years. He has also appeared Off-Broadway in the musicals Avenue Q and Falling for Eve. Kantor portrayed Motel Kamzoil in the Broadway Revival of Fiddler on the Roof at the Broadway Theater.

In 2014, Kantor joined the Jimmy Awards as a coach. With the exception of 2016, he coached every year since he joined.

In 2017, Kantor joined the musical The Band's Visit as Telephone Guy for its transfer to Broadway. In 2018, while still in The Band's Visit, Kantor and Brian Bordainick created Story Course, an interactive musical theater dinner in New York City that tells the stories of immigrants.

== Theater credits ==
Year(s)	Production	Role	Location
2008	Rent	Mark Cohen	Nederlander Theatre (Broadway)
2010	Next to Normal	Henry (Understudy/Replacement)	Booth Theatre (Broadway)
2010	Falling for Eve	God (male)	York Theatre (Off-Broadway)
2011	Avenue Q	Princeton/Rod	New World Stages (Off-Broadway)
2012	Nobody Loves You	Jeff	Old Globe Theatre
2013	The Last Five Years	Jamie Wellerstein	Second Stage Theater (Off-Broadway)
2014	The Two Gentlemen of Verona	Proteus	Old Globe Theatre
2014–2015	Diner	Eddie	Signature Theatre Company
2015–2016	Fiddler on the Roof	Motel Kamzoil	Broadway Theatre
2017	The Last Five Years	Jamie Wellerstein	Colony Theatre
2017–2019	The Band's Visit	Telephone Guy	Ethel Barrymore Theatre (Broadway)
2020	Darling Grenadine	Harry	Roundabout Theatre Company
2022	The Inheritance	Eric Glass	Geffen Playhouse
2024	Tick, Tick… Boom!	Jonathan	Miracle Theatre

== Filmography ==
Year(s)	Title	Role	Notes
2008	Rent: Filmed Live on Broadway	Mark Cohen	Filmed final performance
2009	The Good Wife	Ezra	Episode "Unorthodox"
2011	A Novel Romance	Metro Employee	
2017	Billions	Pununzio	Episode "Golden Frog Time"
2021	Either Side Of Midnight	Daniel	
2025	High Potential	Spencer Wallace	Episode: "Let's Play"

== Awards and nominations ==
Year	Award	Category	Nominated work	Result	Ref.
2019	Grammy Award	Grammy Award for Best Musical Theater Album	The Band's Visit	Won	
2019	Daytime Emmy Award	Outstanding Musical Performance in a Daytime Program (with the cast of The Band's Visit)	The Band's Visit	Won	
