= Songs for a New World =

1995 musical by Jason Robert Brown

- World Premiere Recording
- Music: Jason Robert Brown
- Lyrics: Jason Robert Brown
- Productions: 1995 Off-Broadway; 1998 St. Louis, MO; 2001 Off-West End; 2015 Off-West End; 2018 Encores! 2020 West End; 2021 West End; 2025 London

Songs for a New World is a work of musical theatre written and composed by Jason Robert Brown. This was Jason Robert Brown's first produced show, originally produced Off-Broadway at the WPA Theatre in 1995. Brown and director Daisy Prince put together songs he had written for other venues and events, resulting in "neither musical play nor revue, it is closer to a theatrical song cycle, a very theatrical song cycle."

The show lies between musical and song cycle, but it is neither; it is an abstract musical, a series of songs all connected by a theme: "the moment of decision." The show has four performers who do not play the same characters throughout the show but who do have consistently developing character arcs nonetheless. Composer Brown has said, "It's about one moment. It's about hitting the wall and having to make a choice, or take a stand, or turn around and go back."

Because of its small cast and orchestra, Songs for a New World has become a favorite small show for colleges and local theatres.

== Productions ==
A workshop of the show was produced in Toronto. The original Off-Broadway production ran for a limited 3 1/2-week run, which included two 1/2 weeks of previews at the WPA Theatre in 1995. The original cast consisted of Brooks Ashmanskas, Andréa Burns, Jessica Molaskey and Billy Porter, with direction by Daisy Prince. The original band consisted of Jason Robert Brown on piano, Randy Landau on bass, Tom Partington on drums, Joe Reina on keyboards, and Warren Smith and Rob McEwan on percussion.

The first regional production was mounted by New Line Theatre in St. Louis in 1998.

Songs for a New World premiered in the UK in 2001, at the Bridewell Theatre in a production directed by Clive Paget. The cast was led by Craig Purnell (Best Actor in a Musical, WhatsOnStage Awards 2002), Golda Rosheuvel, Sarah Redmond and Nigel Richards.

The first professional revival in New York was staged in October 2008 at the Chernuchin Theatre, featuring a 14-member youth ensemble in addition to the four principal performers. The production was directed by Debbie Slevin.

In 2013, the show premiered in Paris, France.

In 2015, Songs for a New World was revived at the St James Theatre, London. The cast consisted of Cynthia Erivo, Jenna Russell, Damian Humbley and Dean John-Wilson. The production was directed by Adam Lenson.

A special Encores! Off-Center staged concert of Songs for a New World was performed at New York City Center June 27 through June 30, 2018. The production was directed by Kate Whoriskey and starred Shoshana Bean, Colin Donnell, Mykal Kilgore, and Solea Pfeiffer.

The show continues to be popular among amateur theatre groups with performances across Australia, the US and the UK.

In July 2020, as theatres around the world remained dark due to the COVID-19 pandemic, The Other Palace (formerly St James Theatre) again revived Songs for a New World. Directed by Séimí Campbell, starring Rachel John, Ramin Karimloo, Cedric Neal and Rachel Tucker and featuring new graduate Shem Omari James, the digital production was filmed entirely in isolation with contemporary news footage interwoven with the musical numbers. The production had music supervision by Adam Hoskins. This production was transferred into a physical production for 2 shows at The London Palladium on 11 October 2020. Rachel John, Cedric Neal, Rachel Tucker and Shem Omari James reprised their roles from the digital production. The role of Man 2 was taken over by David Hunter and the show had an ensemble made up of 3rd Year students from Mountview Academy. Audiences were socially distanced and there were other safety measures put into place to protect from the spreading of COVID-19. The London Palladium production is set to have an official West End transfer and run from 5 February 2021 at the Vaudeville Theatre, on the strand. Both Rachels, Cedric and David are all set to reprise their roles.

In March 2025, the show premiered in Oslo, Norway.

In July 2025, to celebrate the 30th anniversary of Songs for a New World, it was announced that the show would play at the Hammersmith Apollo in London for two performances on September 21, 2025. The concert, directed by Michael Longhurst and conducted by Jason Robert Brown himself, starred Tituss Burgess, Jordan Fisher, Shoshana Bean and Joy Woods.

== Cast recordings ==
The 1996 Off-Broadway production was recorded by RCA and released in March 1997. Due to his contractual obligations to A&M Records, Porter could not record his performance for RCA, and so he was replaced by Ty Taylor.

The 2018 Encores! production was recorded by Ghostlight Records and released in January 2019.

== Musical numbers ==
Act I

- "Opening Sequence: The New World" – Company

The company sings of the evening's central theme: that even when everything seems stable and certain, there is "one moment" that can upend and change anyone's life.

- "On the Deck of a Spanish Sailing Ship, 1492" – Man 1 and Company

On the voyage to an undiscovered country, a ship's Captain prays for the safety of the souls aboard his ship.

- "Just One Step" – Woman 2

A wealthy wife climbs out onto the window ledge of her 57th-story apartment in an attempt to get her neglectful husband's attention.

- "I'm Not Afraid of Anything" – Woman 1

A young woman reflects on the fears of the people she loves, and comes to realize how they have held her back.

- "The River Won't Flow" – Man 1, Man 2, Company

A pair of derelicts swap stories of woe and ill luck, concluding that for some, bad luck is just fate.

- "Transition I" – Woman 1
- "Stars and the Moon" – Woman 2

Recounting the stories of two poor suitors and the rich man she eventually marries, a woman comes to realize what she has sacrificed in exchange for wealth and comfort.

- "She Cries" – Man 2

A man describes the power the emotionally manipulative woman he is in love with holds over him.

- "The Steam Train"† – Man 1 and Company

A teenager from a poor neighborhood in New York boasts of his future as a basketball star. His bravado is undercut with a spoken monologue revealing the disadvantages he is determined to overcome.

Act II

- "The World Was Dancing" – Man 2, Woman 1 and Company

A man tells the story of how his father bought, then lost, a store, and how the experience influenced his decision to leave his fiancée.

- "Surabaya-Santa" – Woman 2

In a parody of the Kurt Weill torch song, Surabaya Johnny, Mrs. Claus sings a scornful, teutonic kiss-off to her neglectful husband.

- "Christmas Lullaby" – Woman 1

A woman reacts with wonder and joy to the discovery of her pregnancy, comparing herself to The Virgin Mary.

- "King of the World" – Man 1

A man in some form of prison, either literal or metaphorical, demands that he be freed and returned to his rightful place as a leader of men.

- "I'd Give It All for You" – Man 2 and Woman 1

A pair of former lovers reunite after attempting to live without each other.

- "Transition II" – Man 1
- "The Flagmaker, 1775" – Woman 2

A woman, whose husband and son are fighting in the Revolutionary War sews a flag while attempting to keep her hope alive and her house standing.

- "Flying Home" – Man 1 and Company

A soldier, who has died in battle, sings as his body is flown home to his mother and he crosses over to another life.

- "Final Transition: The New World" – Company
- "Hear My Song" – Company

The company, as if singing a lullaby to a child, express their hope that they have gained by experiencing hardship and how they have gained strength from each other.

† In the 2025 London production, "The Steam Train" was replaced by "Invisible" – originally written for Jason Robert Brown's 2018 album How We React and How We Recover – with the program notes simply listing "Act 1 Finale".

== Music ==
The music of Songs for a New World is influenced by a broad range of musical genres, including pop, gospel and jazz. Many of the songs combine elements of two or more of these genres. The piano features heavily throughout the show's music.

An extensive background and analysis essay about the show was written by Scott Miller. The Variety reviewer noted: "His debut foray into his own spotlight comes with 'Songs for a New World,' a musical revue that shows Brown to be a capable songwriter of the Alan Menken school: commercial show-tune pop with palatable sentiment and easy-to-take melody.... 'Songs for a New World' seems to contain more cabaret convention and pianobar posing than any one revue should have to withstand."
