= Do I Hear a Waltz? =

Musical

- Original Broadway Cast Album
- Music: Richard Rodgers
- Lyrics: Stephen Sondheim
- Book: Arthur Laurents
- Basis: The Time of the Cuckoo by Arthur Laurents
- Productions: 1965 Broadway; 1999 New Brunswick, New Jersey; 2001 Pasadena, California; 2016 Encores!

Do I Hear a Waltz? is a musical with a book by Arthur Laurents, music by Richard Rodgers, and lyrics by Stephen Sondheim. It was adapted from Laurents' 1952 play The Time of the Cuckoo, which was the basis for the 1955 film Summertime starring Katharine Hepburn.

== Background ==
Laurents originally conceived the production as a small chamber musical with music by Richard Rodgers, lyrics by Oscar Hammerstein, and Mary Martin in the lead role of spinster Leona Samish. By the time the project began to jell, however, Hammerstein had died, and Stephen Sondheim was asked by Laurents and Mary Rodgers, Richard Rodgers' daughter, to write the lyrics. Even so, Rodgers felt that the original play did not lend itself to musicalization; Sondheim agreed. According to Peter Filichia, "Sondheim didn't want to do the musical in the first place, but given that Laurents sought him – and had recommended him for 'West Side Story' when he was a novice — he accepted. Also a factor was that his now-deceased mentor Oscar Hammerstein had recommended that he succeed him as Rodgers' lyricist."

Rodgers, who was producing the Broadway production, rejected Martin as too old for Leona.

Franco Zeffirelli was the first choice for director, and he met with Laurents, Sondheim, and Rodgers, who fell asleep during their discussion. Laurents suspected Rodgers had been drinking, and when he discovered a bottle of vodka secreted in the toilet tank during a later visit to the Rodgers apartment, he realized he had been correct. The composer's chronic drinking proved to be a major problem throughout the rehearsal period and pre-Broadway run at the Colonial Theatre in Boston and the Shubert Theatre in New Haven.

Laurents suggested that John Dexter direct the show, but later regretted the choice. Dexter insisted on giving the lead role of Leona to Elizabeth Allen, who Laurents felt could manage the acting and singing but had a cold personality too contrary to that of the character. Rodgers' mistreatment of Sondheim left the lyricist feeling apathetic if not outright sour about the project, but he maintained his professionalism. The first run-through was disastrous, and Dexter immediately lost interest, leaving most of the work to his assistant-choreographer Wakefield Poole. Herbert Ross was called in to work on the dance routines and brought with him his wife Nora Kaye, who served as a mediator among the warring factions. She was faced with an arduous task, given Rodgers' open dismissal of Sondheim's lyrics as "shit," as well as his eventual ban of Laurents from rehearsals completely.

== Synopsis ==
New York City secretary Leona Samish arrives in Venice ("Someone Woke Up"), where she is staying at the Pensione Fioria, where she is greeted by owner Fioria ("This Week Americans"). There she meets Americans Eddie and Jennifer Yaeger, who are living in Rome and have come to Venice for a vacation, and the McIlhennys, an older couple on a package tour ("What Do We Do? We Fly!").

While shopping, Leona sees a ruby glass goblet in a store window and goes inside to inspect it. The owner, Renato di Rossi, tells her it is an authentic 18th-century piece, not a reproduction. He offers not only to find her a matching glass to make up a pair, but to show her the sights of the city, as well. Leona refuses his offer and leaves, but returns the next day to buy the goblet. Later that day, a package with a second goblet is delivered to the hotel. Soon after, Renato arrives to invite Leona to join him for coffee in Piazza San Marco that evening. When the McIlhennys show her their purchase of a set of glasses exactly like hers, Leona believes Renato misrepresented their value, but Signora Fioria assures her they are antiques.

Later in the day, Renato's son Vito comes to tell Leona that Renato will be late for their meeting because one of his children is ill and needs to see a doctor. Realizing Renato is married, she cancels their rendezvous. He comes to the pensione and explains he and his wife have not loved each other for years but divorce is not an option, not only because the country does not permit it, but because they have their children to consider as well. To Leona, his casual attitude about extramarital affairs is wrong, but she still finds herself attracted to him, and agrees to keep their date.

Meanwhile, the Yaegers are facing problems of their own. Eddie, finding himself enamoured with Signora Fioria, announces he wants to put distance between himself and the woman by returning to the United States.

Renato arrives with a garnet necklace for Leona, who is thrilled with his gift and agrees to extend her stay in Venice. She hosts a party in the garden of the pensione, and as the party is in progress, Renato's son Vito comes to tell his father that the jeweler wants his money; overhearing this, Leona happily gives him the money. However, when she discovers Renato has received a commission on the sale of the necklace, she accuses him of being interested only in her money, and he leaves.

Fioria and Jennifer attempt to comfort Leona, who drunkenly reveals Eddie and Fioria spent the previous evening together, only to immediately regret her words ("Everyone Loves Leona"). The following day both the Yaegers and the McIlhennys check out of the pensione as Fioria is happy that everyone is leaving and making way for the next group of guests ("Last Week Americans"). On hearing Renato had been there before she awoke, Leona goes to his store to make amends, but he tells her a relationship with her would be impossible because of her complicated outlook on life. His affection for her is gone, and they part as friends ("Thank You So Much").

== Original cast and characters ==
Character	Broadway	George Street Playhouse	Pasadena Playhouse	Encores!
Character	1965	1999	2001	2016
Leona Samish	Elizabeth Allen	Penny Fuller	Alyson Reed	Melissa Errico
Renato de Rossi	Sergio Franchi	Charles Cioffi	Anthony Crivello	Richard Troxell
Signora Fiora	Carol Bruce	Lynn Cohen	Carol Lawrence	Karen Ziemba
Mrs. McIlhenny	Madeleine Sherwood	Luce Ennis	Elmarie Wendel	Nancy Opel
Mr. McIlhenny	Jack Manning	Robert Levine	Jack Riley	Richard Poe
Eddie Yaeger	Stuart Damon	Todd Gearhart	Benjamin Sprunger	Claybourne Elder
Jennifer Yaeger	Julienne Marie	Anna Belknap	Annie Wersching	Sarah Hunt
Giovanna	Fleury D'Antonakis	Carla Bianco	Tina Gasbarra	Sarah Stiles
Vito	James Dybas	Nick Potenzieri	Nino Del Prete	Michael Rosen
Mauro	Christopher Votos	Nicholas Cutro	Eddy Martin	Zachary Infante

== Song list ==
Act I

- Overture
- "Someone Woke Up" – Leona Samish
- "This Week Americans" – Signora Fioria
- "What Do We Do? We Fly!" – Leona Samish, Mrs. McIlhenny, Mr. McIlhenny, Eddie Yaeger and Jennifer Yaeger
- "Someone Like You" – Renato Di Rossi
- "Bargaining" – Renato Di Rossi
- "Here We Are Again" – Leona Samish, Vito and Ragazzi
- "Thinking" – Renato Di Rossi and Leona Samish
- "No Understand" – Signora Fioria, Eddie Yaeger and Giovanna
- "Take the Moment" – Renato Di Rossi

Act II

- "Moon in My Window" – Jennifer Yaeger, Signora Fioria and Leona Samish
- "We're Gonna Be Alright" [revised] – Eddie Yaeger and Jennifer Yaeger
- "Do I Hear a Waltz?" – Leona Samish and Company
- "Stay" – Renato Di Rossi
- "Perfectly Lovely Couple" – Leona Samish, Renato Di Rossi, Mr. McIlhenny, Mrs. McIlhenny, Jennifer Yaeger, Eddie Yaeger, Giovanna and Signora Fiora
- "Thank You So Much" – Renato Di Rossi and Leona Samish
- Finale

Cut songs

- "Two by Two" - Leona, Vito, girl, Eddie, Jennifer, Fioria, male companion, Mr. McIlhenny, Mrs. McIlhenny
- "We're Gonna Be Alright" [original] – Eddie Yaeger and Jennifer Yaeger
- "Everybody Loves Leona" - Leona (restored in the George Street Playhouse production)
- "Perhaps"
- "Philadelphia"

== Productions ==
The musical opened on Broadway on March 18, 1965, at the 46th Street Theatre and closed on September 25, 1965, after 220 performances. Choreography was by Herbert Ross, with scenery and costumes by Beni Montresor and lighting by Jules Fisher.

Laurents rued the casting - he felt Allen was too young and colorless and Franchi couldn't act - and ignored all the ongoing problems in favor of making his dream a reality, but most of all he regretted the break in his friendship with Sondheim after the show.

The musical received three nominations for the Tony Awards: Elizabeth Allen was nominated for the Tony Award for Best Performance by a Leading Actress in a Musical; nominated for Best Original Score; and nominated for Best Scenic Design, but lost in all three categories.

In May 1966, Do I Hear a Waltz? made its regional theatrical debut at the Pabst Theater in Milwaukee (Wisconsin): Dorothy Collins as Leona led a cast which also included Ron Holgate (Collins' husband) as Renato, Joel Fabiani as Eddie Yaeger. The production encored at the Paper Mill Playhouse in May–June 1966. Also in the summer of 1966 Do I Hear a Waltz made its West Coast premiere, with Anne Jeffreys as Leona leading the Valley Music Theater production in which Richard Torigi played Renato and Fleury D'Antonakis again played Giovanna.

Dorothy Collins would reprise her role of Leona in the summer of 1967 when Do I Hear a Waltz? was presented by the St. Louis Municipal Opera, with a cast also including Fleury D'Antonakis (reprising her Broadway role as Giovanna), Clifford David (Eddie Yaeger), Enzo Stuarti (Renato), Monique van Vooren (Fioria) and Karin Wolfe (Jennifer Yaeger). With Holgate encoring as Renato opposite Collins as Leona, the production was scheduled for two subsequent Boston-area engagements of Do I Hear a Waltz? that summer: however Collins' maternity leave mandated Julia Meade instead headlining those two engagements opposite Holgate. Also in the summer of 1967 Monique van Vooren encored as Fioria in the Kenley Players of Dayton (Ohio) production of Do I Hear a Waltz? which starred Anita Bryant as Leona and featured Don Amendolia as Vito (Carol Bruce had originally been announced as encoring her Broadway role of Fioria for Kenley Players).

A 1969 production starring Patricia Morison as Leona, Mitchell Gregg as Renato, Ken Gilman as Eddie Yeager and Dennis Grimaldi as Vito.

In the summer of 1972 Ronald Holgate again encored as Renato in a tour of Do I Hear a Waltz? with Patrice Munsel headlining as Leona: also in the cast were Richard Kline (Eddie Yaeger) and Denise Lor (Fioria).

In March 1975 Rosalind Harris starred as Leona in a revival of Do I Hear a Waltz? by the Equity Library Theatre of the New York [City] Public Library whose cast also included Melanie Chartoff (Jennifer Yaeger) and Barbara Lea (Fioria).

In 1997, Sondheim was sent a recording of a concert version of Do I Hear a Waltz? that had been presented in London. It was then he realized the original play did lend itself to musical adaptation, but the score Rodgers composed wasn't very good. He enthusiastically contacted Laurents and the two discussed changes that could be made to improve the show.

A revised production was staged at the George Street Playhouse, New Brunswick, New Jersey from October 13, 1999, through November 14, 1999. For this production the dropped song "Everybody Loves Leona" was restored, lyrics were altered or added, and Laurents "revamped quite a bit of the book."

A 2001 revival of the musical was staged at the Pasadena Playhouse, Pasadena, California, where it ran from July 15 through August 19. The production was well received by the critics, and a cast recording was subsequently released on the Fynsworth Alley label.

The first London Production was staged in 1999 by The Landor Theatre; directed by Miles Stinton and Designed by Mike Lees, starring Kate Copstick as Signora Fioria and Rebecca Little as Leona. In 2003, the Landor Theatre in London staged the musical again and in March 2014, Charles Court Opera further revived the show at Park Theatre in Finsbury Park.

The musical was presented by Encores! at New York City Center in May 2016. It was directed by Evan Cabnet.

The 42nd Street Moon company of San Francisco has mounted two revivals of Do I Hear a Waltz?, the first in 1998 with Darren Criss as Mauro, the second in 2014 with Emily Skinner as Leona.

== Critical response ==
The original production received mixed reviews. Howard Taubman of The New York Times observed,

"The authors ... have accomplished their conversion from the play with tact and grace. They have not attempted a complete transformation. On the other hand, they have not cheapened or falsified the play ... They were wise not to overload the musical with production numbers; their taste was unexceptionable when they chose not to turn their work into a brash, noisy affair, which would have been out of keeping with their theme. At the same time one cannot suppress a regret that they failed to be bolder: For there are times, particularly in the early stages, when the songs are merely a decoration. They give the impression that they are there because a musical requires music. They do not translate the story into the fresh and marvelous language that the rich resources of the musical stage make possible."

William Ruhlmann wrote:

"Despite the pedigrees of the creators, the show opened to negative reviews, which is explained only partly by the score as heard on this cast recording. Elizabeth Allen, in the lead role, was criticized with backhanded compliments for being too young and attractive for the part, flaws not apparent on the album. Sergio Franchi, as her romantic partner, also came in for criticism, but comes off much better here. And the small supporting cast, featuring Carol Bruce as the proprietor of a pension, is also impressive. But the songs, for the most part, are not memorable."

The production did not recoup its investment, but several songs, including the title song, received radio play. RCA released a single of two of the songs recorded by Sergio Franchi ("Someone Like You" and "Take the Moment"); and he sang them on several televised shows. Franchi generally received excellent reviews of his singing performance on this show, his Broadway debut.

== Post mortem ==
With the passage of time, Sondheim, the longest surviving member of the original creative team, reflected on what went wrong with Do I Hear a Waltz? To begin with, his reasons for collaborating with Rodgers were prompted out of obligations to others rather than a belief in the material. In his final meeting with Hammerstein, the dying lyricist recommended that Sondheim collaborate with Rodgers. Additionally, Mary Rodgers (the composer's daughter) was a good friend of Sondheim and forcefully urged him to consider a collaboration.

In getting to know Rodgers, Sondheim found a "funny, dour, difficult fellow" who was plagued with self-doubt, thinking that his musical abilities were failing him. This manifested itself in the composer's adamant unwillingness to consider rewriting anything. Sondheim judged "What Do We Do? We Fly" and "Bargaining" to be repetitive songs – victims of the lack of desire to rewrite, a type of song Rodgers called "mechanicals". Sondheim felt that Rodgers need not have been so self-doubting "as songs like 'Take the Moment' and the show's title tune attest." Eventually Rodgers' self-doubt grew into paranoia, with Rodgers thinking that Sondheim and Arthur Laurents were plotting against him.

Optimistic at a chance to do something unusual, Sondheim thought that Leona – the lonely and uptight American – should not sing until the end of the show. Rodgers refused to consider such an innovation, bringing Sondheim to recognize that in the Rodgers and Hammerstein collaboration, it was Hammerstein that was the path breaker, because Rodgers was an "archconservative", whose innovations were restricted to superficial gimmicks (for example, no string instruments in No Strings). Sondheim felt that Rodgers was not able to write a story in song so he ended up writing many of the lyrics first. Unlike his other partnerships in which composers responded with a collaborative give-and-take between lyrics and music, Sondheim felt that working with Rodgers was like "a set of assignments, either from me to Rodgers or Rodgers to me."

One particular incident involved an infamous lyric change referring to a married couple in the song "We're Gonna Be All-Right". Sondheim's lyrics for the song tended to lean toward a more cynical view of marriage and his suggestion that the husband and wife might find consolation by having separate affairs, even a homosexual one, was quite revolutionary for 1965. He recalls, "I wrote lyrics which had some bite to them, and Dick Rodgers thought the song was wonderful. Next day he called a lunch and kept slamming the lyrics against my forearm and saying, 'This will not do, this will not do', and I kept asking, 'Why?' The truth was, he'd shown the lyrics to his wife and she did not like it. He probably showed it to her out of enthusiasm. But you know, it's got stuff about sexuality in it."

Ultimately Sondheim understood the failure of Do I Hear a Waltz? in the context of Mary Rodgers's formulation of what she called a "why? musical". Such a musical is usually based on good source material but raises the question as to what the addition of music does to enhance the original. With rare exceptions (Sondheim cited My Fair Lady as such an exception, because its creators loved and respected the story) "why? musicals" gain nothing from having music added, usually resulting in a dilution of the original material. Sondheim accepted responsibility for being naive: Thinking that his participation in Do I Hear a Waltz? was a quick way to make money off of good source material – an effort that failed.

In his autobiography, Rodgers says that he was keen to work on the musical - he knew and liked The Time of the Cuckoo. In the early stages he felt he and Sondheim worked well together. There was no particular modus operandi, Rodgers would write music to Sondheim's lyrics and vice-versa. However, the problems started to show themselves once they put it on stage. Rodgers felt that "instead of a musical, we had a sad little story with songs." He recommended changes but found that the more they worked on the show, the more estranged he became from both Sondheim and Laurents. "Any suggestions I made were promptly rejected as if by prearrangement." Rogers ultimately viewed "Do I Hear A Waltz" as "not a satisfying experience."

== Recordings ==
The original cast recording was released by Columbia Records in 1965, and was chosen by Billboard as an Original Cast Spotlight Album. A remastered version was released on compact disc and cassette tape by Sony Broadway in 1992. A KeelanMusic review gives a very favorable review to the Original Cast recordings, irrespective of the Broadway criticisms.

The 13 March 1975 performance of the 1975 Equity Library production was recorded on audiocassette and is held in the Equity Library Theatre collection.

A recording of the Pasadena Playhouse production was released by Fynsworth Alley in 2001. Musical excerpts (not included on the original cast recording) include the overture, Lezione in Inglese, We're Going to the Lido, Everybody Loves Leona.

== Awards and nominations ==
=== Original Broadway production ===
Year	Award	Category	Nominee	Result
1965	Tony Award	Best Original Score	Richard Rodgers and Stephen Sondheim	Nominated
1965	Tony Award	Best Actress in a Musical	Elizabeth Allen	Nominated
1965	Tony Award	Best Scenic Design	Beni Montresor	Nominated
