= Caren Lyn Tackett =

American theater and voice actress, singer and writer

- Born: Caren Lyn Manuel; August 14, 1976 (age 50); Boxford, Massachusetts, U.S.
- Education: Emerson College
- Occupations: Voice actress, stage actress, writer, producer
- Years active: 1996–present
- Spouse: Jeremy Tackett
- Children: 1

Caren Lyn Tackett (née Manuel; born August 14, 1976) is an American stage actress who has provided voice-overs for animation productions of 4Kids Entertainment, including Winx Club, Pokémon Chronicles, Shaman King and Teenage Mutant Ninja Turtles. She has worked in various Broadway productions in New York City, including Hair, Rent, High Fidelity, Brooklyn and The Times They Are A'Changin' .

== Filmography ==
=== Animation ===
- Shaman King – Kanna, Jeanne
- Winx Club (2004–07) – Stella, Darcy, Mirta, Chatta (4Kids dub, credited as Caren Lyn Manuel)
- Teenage Mutant Ninja Turtles - Valencia
- Pokémon Chronicles - Marina

=== Toys and videogames ===
- Winx Club - Stella, Darcy, Mirta (Konami, VG) (2005)
- Winx Club Singsational Dolls (Mattel) - Stella
- Shaman King: Power of Spirit (VG) - Kanna

== Theatre roles ==
- Rent (1996–2008) – Maureen (Broadway, understudy and World Tour), Mimi (Broadway, understudy), Mrs. Cohen
- Brooklyn (2004–05) – Brooklyn (understudy), Faith (understudy)
- The Times They Are A-Changin' (2006) – Cleo
- High Fidelity (2006) – Sarah, Liz (understudy), Charlie (understudy), Marie LaSalle (understudy), Jackie (understudy)
- Hair (2011) – Sheila
- Born Blue (2012) – Co-producer, writer
- Evita - Eva
- Grease - Sandy
- Fame - Carmen
- Les Misérables - Eponine
