= Luther Creek =

American actor and singer

- Born: January 28, 1972 (age 53); Stamford, Connecticut
- Occupation(s): Actor, singer
- Years active: 1988–present

Luther Creek (born January 28, 1972) is an American actor and singer best known for his roles in Broadway and West End musicals.

== Biography ==
Born in Stamford, Connecticut, Creek is the son of J. Fred Creek, a realtor from New Mexico, and his wife Patricia, originally of Indianapolis. Luther grew up in towns throughout the Midwest and Southwest, as his family moved frequently. He attended high school in Indiana, where he began to perform in community theatre. He also performed in rock bands.

== Acting career ==
Creek's Broadway roles include Roger Davis in Rent (1998, after having played Mark Cohen in the National Tour of Rent beginning in 1996 and then Roger beginning in 1997), Lyle in Footloose (1999) and Bobby Strong in Urinetown (2003). In the early 1990s, Creek understudied the title role in the European premiere of Tommy. Creek also played the role of Claude in the (1993) James Rado-directed, 25th anniversary U.S. national tour of Hair (1994) and the 2001 City Center Encores! concert of Hair with Tom Plotkin and Idina Menzel. He also appeared in the 2000 revival of Jesus Christ Superstar. Off-Broadway roles have included Peter in A Man of No Importance (2002). His latest role is Woof in the 2010 West End revival of Hair. He is currently starring in the new Broadway musical Spider-Man: Turn Off the Dark, in the role of Kenny "Kong" McFarlane, among others. The show began previews on November 28, 2010, and opened June 14, 2011. The show’s Broadway run concluded on January 4, 2014.

Creek has also appeared in films and on television, including guest-starring roles in several episodes of the Law & Order franchise and has done voice work.

== Filmography ==
Television: Show / Year / Role / No. of episodes; One Life to Live / 1999 / Skeet / 2; Strangers with Candy / 1999 / History Student / 2; The Education of Max Bickford / 2001 / Vince / 1; Law & Order: Special Victims Unit / 2001 / Miguel Alvarez / 1; As the World Turns / 2004 / Andrew Blackmoore / 4; Conviction / 2006 / Dealer / 1; Law & Order: Criminal Intent / 2006 / Curtis Gold / 1; Law and Order: Special Victims Unit / 2006 / Elmo Figgs / 1; Flight of the Conchords / 2007 / Mickey / 1; The Unusuals / 2009 / Arliss Storch / 1; Breadwinners / 2015 / Dark Rye (voice) / 1; Film
Film	Year	Role	Notes
Eight Men Out	1988	Ball park usher	Uncredited
Zoolander	2001	Freaky loft guest	
Across the Universe	2007	Prankster	
Play it Be Played	2008	Francis "Chuckie" Reese	TV movie
Make Yourself at Home	2008	Medic 2	
Rent: Live	2019	RENT Alumni Singer	Uncredited
