= Yassmin Alers =

Stage actress

Yassmin Alers is an American film and stage actress.

== Early life and education ==
Alers was born in New York City's Spanish Harlem as the middle child of a close-knit family of five children. She has a Bachelor of Science in Psychology.

== Career ==
She was dance captain and understudy in the original broadway cast of Jonathan Larson's RENT on Broadway. She also appeared in the Broadway productions of Paul Simon's The Capeman and in the revival of The Rocky Horror Show. Alers has appeared in the International Tour of The Who's Tommy and the National Tour of RENT. She most recently was on Broadway with On Your Feet and at GEVA Theater Center in Rochester with In The Heights, where she played the role of Abuela Claudia.

== Filmography ==
- West Side Story (2021) as Lluvia
- The American Mall (2008) (TV) as Erin
- Chain Link (2008) as Jade
- Across the Universe (2007) as Harlot
- The Ten Commandments: The Musical (2006) as Ensemble
