= Rent (musical) =

American rock musical by Jonathan Larson

- Broadway promotional poster
- Music: Jonathan Larson
- Lyrics: Jonathan Larson
- Book: Jonathan Larson
- Basis: La bohème by Giacomo Puccini; Luigi Illica; Giuseppe Giacosa
- Premiere: February 13, 1996: New York Theatre Workshop, New York City
- Productions: 1993 Workshop; 1996 Off-Broadway; 1996 Broadway; 1996 Angel Tour; 1997 Benny Tour; 1997 Collins Tour; 1998 West End; 2001 UK Tour; 2001 West End; 2007 West End; 2009 Mark Tour; 2016 UK Tour; 2016 20th Anniversary US Tour; 2021 25th Anniversary US Tour; 2026 West End
- Awards: Pulitzer Prize for Drama; Tony Award for Best Musical; Tony Award for Best Book of a Musical; Tony Award for Best Original Score; Drama Desk Award for Outstanding Musical; Drama Desk Award for Outstanding Book of a Musical; Drama Desk Award for Outstanding Music; Drama Desk Award for Outstanding Lyrics

Rent (stylized in all caps) is a rock musical with music, lyrics, and book by Jonathan Larson. Loosely based on the 1896 opera La bohème by Giacomo Puccini, Luigi Illica, and Giuseppe Giacosa, it tells the story of a group of impoverished young artists struggling to survive and create a life in Lower Manhattan's East Village, in the thriving days of the bohemian culture of Alphabet City, under the shadow of HIV/AIDS.

The musical was first seen in 1993 in a workshop production at New York Theatre Workshop, the off-Broadway theatre which was also where the musical began performances on January 26, 1996. The show's creator, Jonathan Larson, had died suddenly of an aortic dissection the night before. The musical moved to Broadway's larger Nederlander Theatre on April 29, 1996.

On Broadway, Rent gained critical acclaim and won several awards, including the Pulitzer Prize for Drama and the Tony Award for Best Musical. The Broadway production closed on September 7, 2008, after 12 years, making it one of the longest-running shows on Broadway. The production grossed over $280 million.

The success of the show led to several national tours and numerous foreign productions. In 2005, it was adapted into a motion picture featuring six of the eight principal cast members from the 1996 stage premiere. (Note: The Broadway originator in the role of Mimi, Daphne Rubin-Vega, was pregnant at the time of the movie's casting and filming.) (Note: The Broadway originator in the role of Joanne, Fredi Walker, had been the oldest of the main cast when the stage production premiered in 1996 – older at that time than some of the main cast were by the time of the film. She stated that she was not offered the film role due to her age, but did request that the producers cast an actress of African descent for the film.)

== Concept and genesis ==
In 1988, playwright Billy Aronson wanted to create "a musical based on Puccini's La Bohème, in which the luscious splendor of Puccini's world would be replaced with the coarseness and noise of modern New York." In 1989, Jonathan Larson, a 29-year-old composer, began collaborating with Aronson on this project, and the two composed together "Santa Fe", "Rent", and "I Should Tell You". Larson suggested setting the play "in the East Village neighborhood of Manhattan." He suggested making "Rent" the title; Aronson agreed. In 1991, he asked Aronson if he could use Aronson's original concept and make Rent his own. Larson had ambitious expectations for Rent; his ultimate dream was to write a rock opera "to bring musical theater to the MTV generation". Aronson and Larson made an agreement that if the show went to Broadway, Aronson would share in the proceeds and be given credit for "original concept & additional lyrics".

Jonathan Larson focused on composing Rent in the early 1990s, waiting tables at the Moondance Diner to support himself. Over the course of years, Larson wrote hundreds of songs and made many drastic changes to the show, which in its final incarnation contained 42 songs. In the fall of 1992, Larson approached James Nicola, artistic director of New York Theatre Workshop, with a tape and copy of Rent's script. When Rent had its first staged reading at New York Theatre Workshop in March 1993, it became evident that, despite its very promising material and moving musical numbers, many structural problems needed to be addressed, including its cumbersome length and overly complex plot.

As of 1994, the New York Theatre Workshop version of Rent featured songs that never made it into the final version, such as:

- "Cool/Fool"
- "Do a Little Business", the predecessor of "You'll See", featuring Benny, Mark, Roger, Collins and Angel
- "Female to Female A & B", featuring Maureen and Joanne
- "He's a Fool"
- "He Says"
- "Right Brain", later rewritten as "One Song Glory", featuring Roger
- "Over It", the predecessor of "Tango: Maureen", featuring Mark and Maureen
- "Real Estate", a number wherein Benny tries to convince Mark to become a real estate agent and drop his filmmaking
- "Open Road", the predecessor of "What You Own", with a backing track similar to this in "Your Eyes"

This workshop version of Rent starred Anthony Rapp as Mark and Daphne Rubin-Vega as Mimi. Larson continued to work on Rent, gradually reworking its flaws and staging more workshop productions.

On January 24, 1996, after the musical's final dress rehearsal before its off-Broadway opening, Larson had his first (and only) newspaper interview; music critic Anthony Tommasini of The New York Times – who had been attracted by the coincidence that the show was debuting exactly 100 years after Puccini's opera – requested the interview. Larson would not live to see Rent's success; he died from an undiagnosed aortic dissection (believed to have resulted from Marfan syndrome) early the next morning, January 25, 1996. Friends and family gathered at the New York Theatre Workshop, and the first preview of Rent became a sing-through of the musical in Larson's memory.

The show premiered as planned and quickly gained popularity fueled by enthusiastic reviews and the recent death of its composer. It proved extremely successful during its off-Broadway run, selling out all its shows at the 150-seat New York Theatre Workshop. Due to such overwhelming popularity and a need for a larger theater, Rent moved to Broadway's then-under-renovation Nederlander Theatre on 41st Street and opened on April 29, 1996.

== Sources and inspiration ==
Larson's inspiration for Rent's content came from several different sources. Many of the characters and plot elements are drawn directly from Giacomo Puccini's opera La Bohème, the world premiere of which was in 1896, a century before Rent's premiere. La Bohème was also about the lives of poor young artists. Tuberculosis, the plague of Puccini's opera, is replaced by HIV/AIDS in Rent; 1800s Paris is replaced by New York's East Village in the late 1980s or early 1990s. The names and identities of Rent's characters also heavily reflect Puccini's original characters, though they are not all direct adaptations. For example, Joanne in Rent represents the character of Alcindoro in Bohème, but is also partially based on Marcello.

La Bohème	Rent
Mimì, a seamstress with tuberculosis	Mimi Márquez, an erotic dancer who is HIV positive and Roger's girlfriend
Rodolfo, a poet	Roger Davis, a songwriter-musician who is HIV positive and Mimi's boyfriend
Marcello, a painter	Mark Cohen, an independent Jewish-American filmmaker and Roger's roommate
Musetta, a singer	Maureen Johnson, a bisexual performance artist and Joanne's girlfriend
Schaunard, a musician	Angel Dumott Schunard, a drag queen and percussionist with AIDS, who is Collins's partner.
Colline, a philosopher	Tom Collins, a gay, part-time philosophy professor at New York University and anarchist with AIDS and Angel's partner.
Alcindoro, a state counselor	Joanne Jefferson, a lesbian lawyer, who is Maureen's girlfriend (also partially based on Marcello)
Benoît, their landlord	Benjamin "Benny" Coffin III, the local landlord and a former roommate of Roger, Mark, Collins, and Maureen

Other examples of parallels between Larson's and Puccini's work include Larson's song "Light My Candle", which draws melodic content directly from "Che gelida manina"; "Quando me'n vo'" ("Musetta's Waltz"), a melody taken directly from Puccini's opera; and "Goodbye Love", a long, painful piece that reflects a confrontation and parting between characters in both Puccini's and Larson's work. "Quando me'n vo'" is paralleled in the first verse of "Take Me or Leave Me", when Maureen describes the way people stare when she walks in the street. It is also directly referred to in the scene where the characters are celebrating their bohemian life. Mark says, "Roger will attempt to write a bittersweet, evocative song..." Roger plays a quick piece, and Mark adds, "...that doesn't remind us of 'Musetta's Waltz'." This part of "Musetta's Waltz" is also later used in "Your Eyes", a song Roger writes.

Rent is also a somewhat autobiographical work, as Larson incorporated many elements of his life into his show. Larson lived in New York for many years as a starving artist with an uncertain future. He sacrificed a life of stability for his art, and shared many of the same hopes and fears as his characters. Like his characters he endured poor living conditions, and some of these conditions (e.g. illegal wood-burning stove, bathtub in the middle of his kitchen, broken buzzer [his guests had to call from the pay phone across the street and he would throw down the keys, as in "Rent"]) made their way into the musical. Part of the motivation behind the storyline in which Maureen leaves Mark for a woman (Joanne) is based on the fact that Larson's own girlfriend left him for a woman. The Mark Cohen character is based on Larson's friends, cinematographer and producer Jonathan Burkhart and documentary filmmaker Eddie Rosenstein.

Playwright Sarah Schulman alleged that Rent bore striking similarities to her novel People in Trouble. Schulman's 1998 book Stagestruck: Theater, AIDS, and the Marketing of Gay America details these similarities and discusses her critiques of the musical.

The line, "I'm more of a man than you'll ever be... and more of a woman than you'll ever get!", attributed to Angel Dumott Schunard at her funeral, was previously used by the character Hollywood Montrose, who appeared in the films Mannequin (1987) and Mannequin Two: On the Move (1991). Like Angel, Hollywood performs a song and dance number and sometimes wears women's clothing. This line was originally in the film Car Wash (1976), delivered by Antonio Fargas as a flamboyant homosexual cross dresser named Lindy.

The earliest concepts of the characters differ largely from the finished products. Everyone except Mark had AIDS, including Maureen and Joanne; Maureen was a serious, angry character who played off Oedipus in her performance piece instead of Hey Diddle Diddle; Mark was, at one point, a painter instead of a filmmaker; Roger was named Ralph and wrote musical plays; Angel was a jazz philosopher, while Collins was a street performer; Angel and Collins were both originally described as Caucasian; and Benny had a somewhat enlarged role in the story, taking part in songs like "Real Estate", which was later cut.

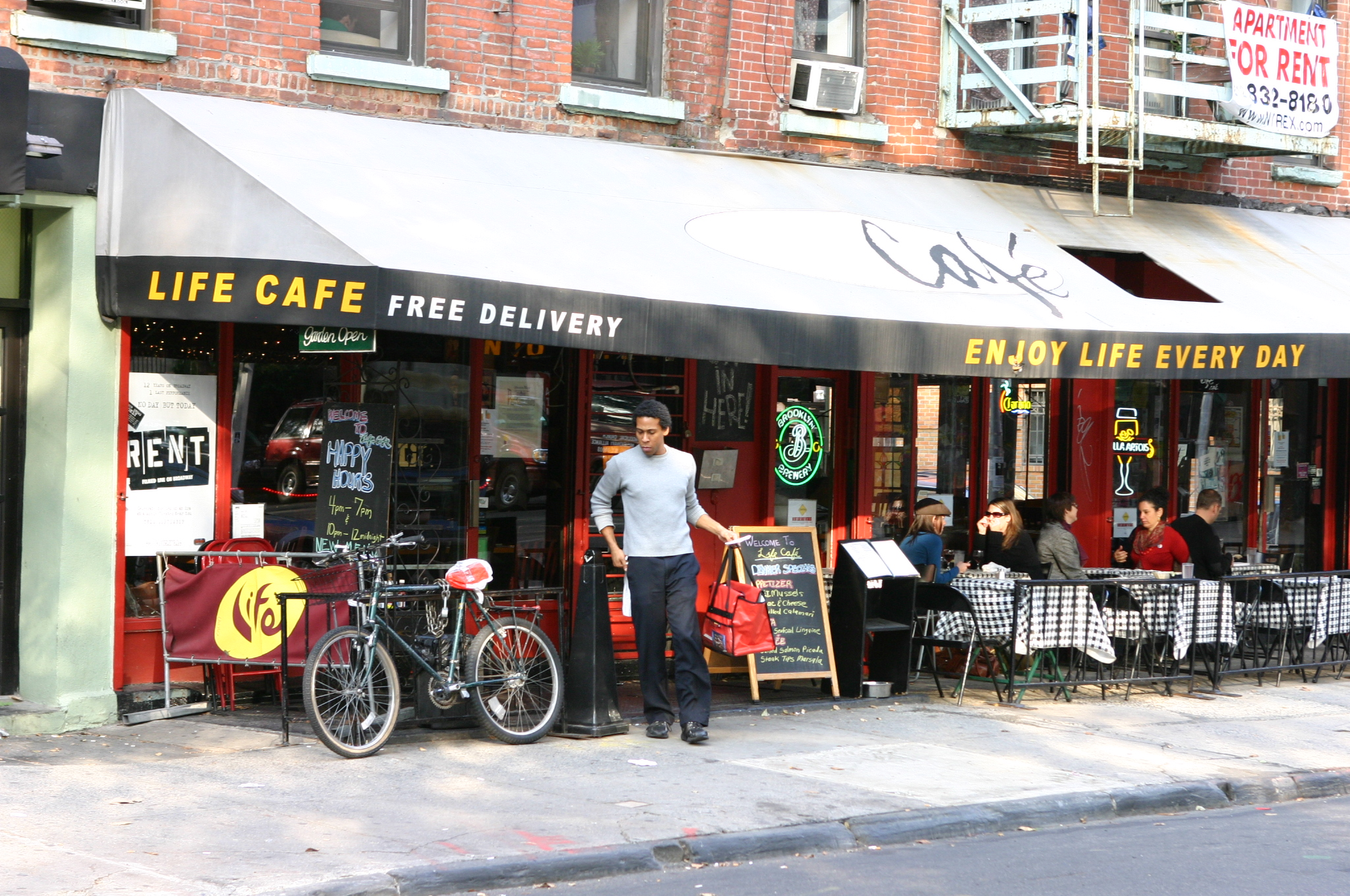
Life Café

Many actual locations and events are included in, or are the inspiration for, elements of the musical. Life Café, where the "La Vie Bohème" numbers are set, was an actual restaurant (closed 2013) on 10th Street and Avenue B in the East Village of New York City. The riot at the end of the first act is based on the East Village riot in 1988 that arose as a result of the city-imposed curfew in Tompkins Square Park.

"Will I?", a song which takes place during a Life Support meeting and expresses the pain and fear of living a life with AIDS, was inspired by a real event. Larson attended a meeting of Friends In Deed, an organization that helps people deal with illness and grief, much like Life Support. After that first time, Larson attended the meetings regularly. During one meeting, a man stood up and said that he was not afraid of dying. He did say, however, that there was one thing of which he was afraid: Would he lose his dignity? From this question stemmed the first line of this song. The people present at the Life Support meeting in the show, such as Gordon, Ali and Pam, carry the names of Larson's friends who died. In the Broadway show, the names of the characters in that particular scene (they introduce themselves) were changed nightly to honor the friends of the cast members who were living with or had died from AIDS.

The scene and song "Life Support" were also based on Friends in Deed, as well as on Gordon, Pam, and Ali. Originally, the members of Life Support had a solid block of the "forget regret" refrain, and they talked about remembering love. When Jonathan's HIV positive friends heard this scene, they told him that having AIDS was not so easy to accept: it made you angry and resentful too, and the song did not match that. Jonathan then added a part where Gordon says that he has a problem with this "credo...my T-cells are low, I regret that news, okay?" Paul, the leader of the meeting, replies, "Okay...but, Gordon, how do you feel today?" Gordon admits that he is feeling the best that he has felt all year. Paul asks, "Then why choose fear?" Gordon says, "I'm a New Yorker. Fear's my life."

== Lynn Thomson lawsuit ==
Lynn Thomson was a dramaturge who was hired by New York Theatre Workshop to help rework Rent. She claimed that between early May and the end of October 1995, she and Larson co-wrote a "new version" of the musical, and that she had a verbal agreement with Larson to a percentage of the royalties. She sued Jonathan Larson's estate for $40 million and sought 16 percent of the show's royalties, ultimately losing that suit. A revised suit claiming she had written a significant portion of the lyrics and the libretto of the "new version" of Rent was filed later. The estate settled out of court.

During the trial, according to a partner in the firm representing the Larson estate, Thomson could not recall the lyrics to the songs that she allegedly wrote, nor the structures of the libretto she claimed to have created. The judge ruled against her and gave Larson's estate full credit and right to Rent. A federal appellate court upheld the original ruling on appeal. In the judgement, the court ruled against Thomson saying "she had brought the wrong suit." Thomson had sued over a verbal agreement she claimed to have with Larson, which she could not prove. However, the court stated in the judgment that her claim to have written some of the material in RENT, including the lyrics to the song "Glory," was credible and that she had standing to sue for ownership of some of the material in RENT. She filed suit with revised claims. In August 1998, the case was settled out of court. The terms of the settlement were not disclosed.

== Synopsis ==
=== Act I ===
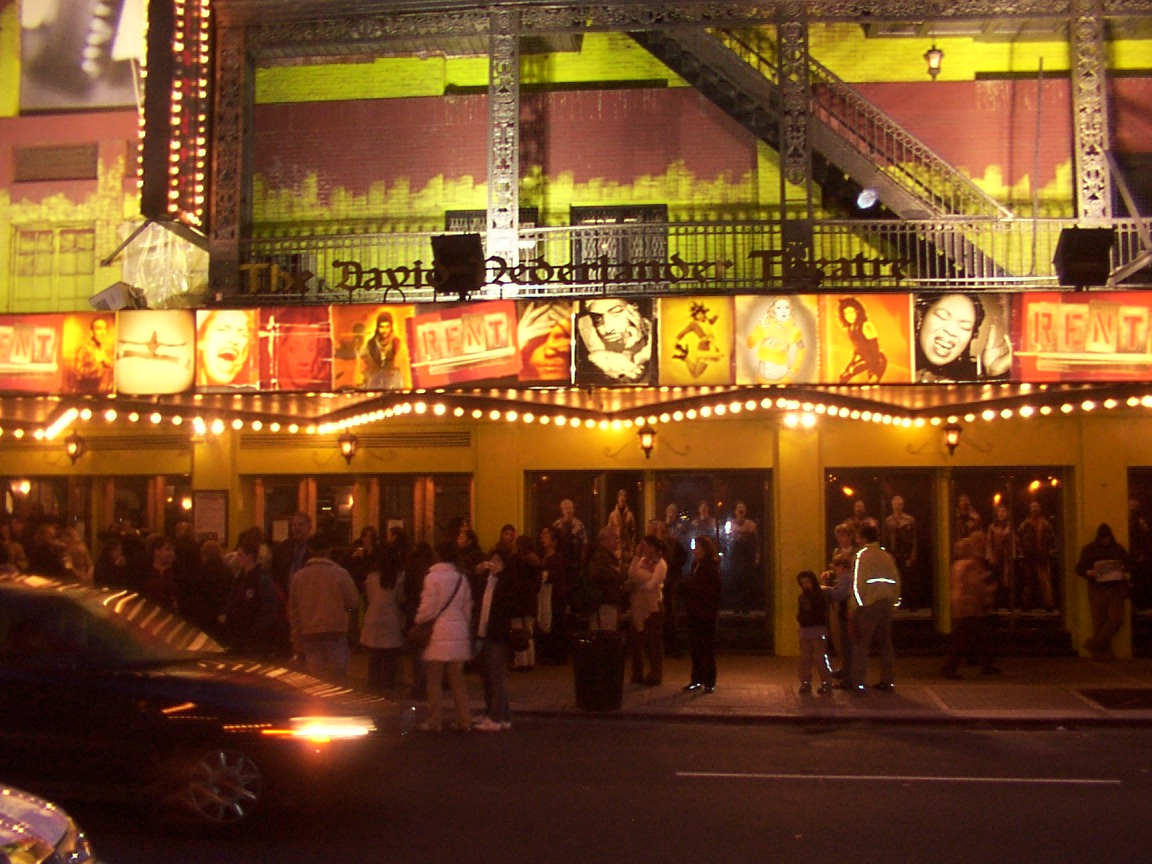
Rent at David Nederlander Theatre in Manhattan, New York City

On Christmas Eve in Manhattan's East Village, two roommates—Mark, a filmmaker, and Roger, a rock musician—struggle to stay warm and produce their art ("Tune Up #1"). Mark's mother leaves him a voicemail wishing him a Merry Christmas and trying to comfort him since his ex-girlfriend Maureen dumped him ("Voice Mail #1"). Their friend Tom Collins, a gay anarchist professor of computer-age philosophy at New York University, calls and plans to surprise them at their apartment, but is mugged before entering. At the same time, Mark and Roger's former roommate and friend Benny, who has since become their harsh new landlord, has reneged on an earlier agreement and now demands last year's rent, before shutting down their electrical power ("Tune Up #2"). However, Mark and Roger stubbornly resolve against paying the rent, which they were promised would not be a problem ("Rent"). Meanwhile, Angel, a cross-dressing street drummer (presently out of drag), finds Collins wounded in an alley and tends to him ("You Okay Honey?") - the two are immediately attracted to each other, each learning that the other is HIV positive. It is revealed that Roger also has HIV, which he contracted from his last girlfriend, who died by suicide after learning of her diagnosis, causing Roger to fall into depression. Mark leaves the loft while Roger stays home ("Tune Up #3"), trying to compose on his guitar without success; he wishes desperately to write one last song to be remembered by before he dies ("One Song Glory"). Their neighbor Mimi, an exotic dancer and drug addict, arrives at their apartment asking for help with lighting her candle, flirting with Roger in the process; however, he is clearly hesitant to return her affections ("Light My Candle"). Meanwhile, Joanne, a lawyer and Maureen's new girlfriend, receives a voicemail from her parents ("Voice Mail #2").

At last, the missing Collins enters the apartment, presenting Angel, who is now in full drag; she amusingly shares the money she earned from killing an affluent couple's dog by loudly playing nonstop for an hour ("Today 4 U"). Mark comes home, and Benny arrives, speaking of Maureen's upcoming protest against his plans to evict the homeless from a lot where he is hoping to build a cyber arts studio. Benny offers that, if they can successfully convince Maureen to cancel the protest, then Mark and Roger can officially remain rent-free tenants. However, the two rebuff Benny's offer and he leaves ("You'll See"). Mark leaves the loft again to go help Maureen with the sound equipment for the protest, unexpectedly meeting Joanne at the stage. Initially hesitant with each other, the two eventually bond over their shared distrust of Maureen's "gaslighting" and promiscuous behavior ("Tango: Maureen"). Mark then joins Collins and Angel to film their HIV support group meeting ("Life Support"), while Mimi attempts to seduce Roger alone in his apartment ("Out Tonight"). Extremely upset by Mimi's intrusion, he demands that she leave him alone and resists any romantic feelings he may harbor for her ("Another Day"). After Mimi leaves, Roger reflects on his fear of dying an undignified death from AIDS, while the Life Support group echoes his thoughts ("Will I").

Collins, Mark, and Angel protect a homeless woman from police harassment using Mark's camera, but she chastises them, believing their intent was for Mark to make a name for himself from her situation ("On the Street"). To lighten the mood, Collins talks about his dream of escaping New York City to open a restaurant in Santa Fe ("Santa Fe"). Soon, Mark leaves to check up on Roger; while alone, Collins and Angel confess their love for each other ("I'll Cover You"). Joanne hectically prepares for Maureen's show, trying to balance the simultaneous multiple calls ("We're Okay"). Before the performance, Roger apologizes to Mimi, inviting her to come to the protest and the dinner party his friends are having afterwards. At the same time, police, vendors, and homeless people prepare for the protest ("Christmas Bells"). Maureen performs in an avant-garde, if not over-the-top, manner, basing her piece on "Hey Diddle Diddle" ("Over the Moon"). At the post-show party at the Life Café, Benny arrives, criticizing the protest and the group's bohemian lifestyle while also revealing that his wife Alison's Akita, Evita, died due to Angel's actions; Mark and his group defiantly respond by celebrating their status ("La Vie Bohème"). Mimi and Roger each discover that the other is HIV-positive and hesitantly decide to continue their relationship ("I Should Tell You"). At the end of the Act, Joanne explains that Mark and Roger's building has been padlocked and a riot has broken out; Roger and Mimi, unaware of the violence, share their first kiss. The celebration continues ("La Vie Bohème B").

=== Act II ===
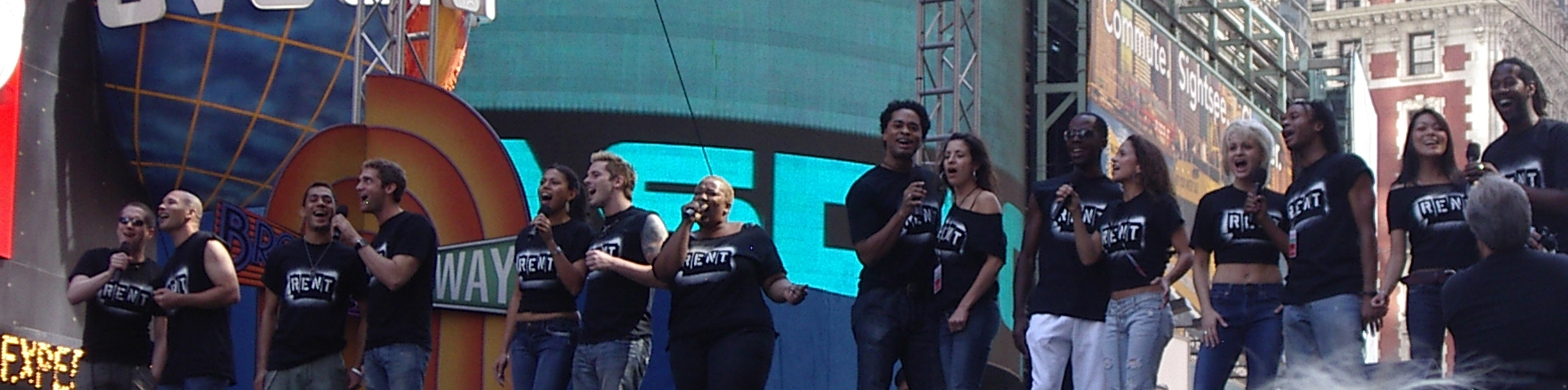
The 2005 cast of Rent performing "Seasons of Love" at Broadway on Broadway

The cast lines up to sing together before the plot of the second act begins, affirming that one should measure life "in love" ("Seasons of Love"). On New Year's Eve, Mark, Mimi, Roger, Maureen, Joanne, Collins and Angel gather to break back into Mark and Roger's apartment which they have been locked out of ("Happy New Year"). Once Mark, Joanne and Maureen break in through the window, a voicemail reveals that Mark's footage of the riot has earned him a job offering at a tabloid news company called Buzzline ("Voice Mail #3"). The others finally break through the door just as Benny arrives, saying he wants to call a truce and revealing that Mimi, a former girlfriend of his, convinced him to change his mind. Mimi denies rekindling her relationship with Benny, but Roger is upset, and although they apologize to each other, Mimi goes to her drug dealer for a fix ("Happy New Year B").

Around Valentine's Day, Mark tells the audience that Roger and Mimi have been living together, Collins and Angel are nowhere to be found, and Maureen and Joanne are preparing another protest; during rehearsal, Maureen criticizes Joanne's controlling behavior, while Joanne criticizes Maureen's promiscuity. They break up dramatically following an ultimatum ("Take Me or Leave Me"). Time progresses to spring ("Seasons of Love B"), where Roger and Mimi's relationship is strained by Mimi's escalating heroin usage and Roger's lasting jealousy and suspicion of Benny. Each alone, Roger and Mimi sing of love and loneliness, telling each other how they feel, as they watch Collins nurse Angel, whose health is declining due to AIDS ("Without You"). By the end of the summer, Mark continues to receive calls offering a corporate job at Buzzline ("Voice Mail #4"). A dance is performed representing all the couples' sex lives ("Contact"). At the climax of the number, the two former couples break up, and Angel suddenly dies in Collins' arms. At the funeral, the friends briefly come together to share their memories, with Collins being the last to reminisce ("I'll Cover You [Reprise]"). Mark expresses his fear of being the sole survivor when his friends eventually die of AIDS, and he finally accepts the corporate job offer ("Halloween"). Roger reveals that he is leaving for Santa Fe, which sparks an argument about commitment between him and Mimi, while Maureen and Joanne argue. Collins arrives and admonishes the entire group for fighting on the day of Angel's funeral, causing Maureen and Joanne to reconcile, but not Mimi and Roger. The group share a sad moment, knowing that between deaths and leaving, their close-knit friendships will become undone. Everyone leaves except Mark and Roger, where Mark tries to convince Roger to stay in New York. Roger, unable to handle Mimi's declining health, becomes furious with Mark and leaves. Mimi returns to say goodbye, overhearing everything Roger had said and, terrified, agrees to go to rehab, which Benny pays for ("Goodbye Love"). Collins is forcibly removed from the church for being unable to pay for Angel's funeral; Benny shows compassion by paying and offering Mark and Collins drinks. Collins accepts, causing the latter and Benny to rekindle their old friendship, but Mark turns down the offer due to work commitments.

Some time later, both Mark and Roger simultaneously reach an artistic epiphany, as Roger finds his song in Mimi and Mark finds his film in Angel's memory; Roger decides to return to New York in time for Christmas, while Mark quits his job to devote his efforts to working on his own film ("What You Own"). The characters' parents, concerned and confused about their respective situations, leave several worried messages on their answering machines ("Voice Mail #5"). On Christmas Eve, exactly one year having passed, Mark prepares to screen his now-completed film to his friends. Roger has written his song, but apparently, Mimi is missing, and no one has seen her. Benny's wife, discovering Benny's past relationship with Mimi, has pulled him out of the East Village. The power suddenly blows and Collins enters with handfuls of cash, revealing that he reprogrammed an ATM at a grocery store to provide money to anybody with the code 'ANGEL'. Maureen and Joanne abruptly enter carrying Mimi, who had been homeless and is now weak and close to death. She begins to fade, telling Roger that she loves him ("Finale"). Roger tells her to hold on as he plays her the song he wrote for her, revealing the depth of his feelings for her ("Your Eyes"). Mimi appears to die, but abruptly awakens, claiming to have been heading into a white light before a vision of Angel appeared, telling her to go back and stay with Roger. The remaining friends gather together in a final moment of shared happiness and resolve to enjoy whatever time they have left with each other, affirming that there is "no day but today" ("Finale B").

== Roles ==
=== Main characters ===
- Mark Cohen: A struggling Jewish-American documentary filmmaker and the narrator of the show. He is Roger's roommate; at the start of the show, he has recently been dumped by Maureen.
- Roger Davis: A once-successful-but-now-struggling musician and ex-lead singer and rock guitarist who is HIV-positive and an ex-junkie. He hopes to write one last meaningful song before he dies. He has difficulty coping with his own mortality as well as that of his friends. His girlfriend, April, killed herself after finding out that she was HIV-positive. He is roommates with Mark.
- Mimi Márquez: A Latina stripper and drug addict. She lives downstairs from Mark and Roger, is Roger's love interest, and, like him, is HIV-positive. She is also Benny's ex-lover.
- Tom Collins: A gay anarchist professor with AIDS. He is described by Mark as a "computer genius, teacher, and vagabond anarchist who ran naked through the Parthenon." Collins dreams of opening a restaurant in Santa Fe, where the problems in New York will not affect him and his friends. He was formerly a roommate of Roger, Mark, Benny, and Maureen, now just Roger and Mark, until he moves out.
- Angel Dumott Schunard: A young drag queen who is addressed as female when in drag and as male when out of drag. Angel, who has AIDS, is a street percussionist with a generous disposition as well as Collins' love interest.
- Maureen Johnson: A performance artist who is Mark's ex-girlfriend and Joanne's current girlfriend. She is very flirtatious and cheated on Mark. Larson considered Maureen a lesbian, despite her previous relationships with men, and he specifically identified her as "lesbian" in the script itself.
- Joanne Jefferson: An Ivy League-educated public interest lawyer and a lesbian. Joanne is the woman for whom Maureen left Mark. Joanne has very politically powerful parents (one is undergoing confirmation to be a judge, the other is a government official).
- Benjamin "Benny" Coffin III: The landlord of Mark, Roger, and Mimi's apartment building and ex-roommate of Mark, Collins, Roger, and Maureen. Now married to Alison Grey of the Westport Greys, a very wealthy family involved in real estate, and he is considered yuppie scum and a sell-out by his ex-roommates. He at one time had a relationship with Mimi.

=== Minor characters ===
- Mrs. Cohen: Mark's stereotypical Jewish mother. Her voicemail messages are the basis for the songs Voicemail #1, Voicemail #3, and Voicemail #5.
- Alexi Darling: The producer of Buzzline, a sleazy tabloid company that tries to employ Mark after his footage of the riot makes primetime. Sings Voicemail #3 and Voicemail #4.
- Mr. and Mrs. Jefferson: The wealthy parents of Joanne Jefferson, they leave her Voicemail #2. Mr. Jefferson is also one of the a cappella singers in Voicemail #5. Mr. and Mrs. Jefferson's actors usually sing the solos in Seasons of Love.
- Mrs. Davis: Roger's confused mother who calls in Voicemail #5, asking continuously, "Roger, where are you?"
- Mrs. Marquez: Mimi's Spanish-speaking mother who sings in Voicemail #5, wondering, in Spanish, where she is.
- Mr. Grey: Benny's father-in-law who wants to buy out the lot.
- The Man: The local drug dealer whom Mimi buys from and Roger used to buy from. Based on the character Parpignol from La Bohème.
- Paul: The man in charge of the Life Support group.
- Gordon: One of the Life Support members.
- Steve: One of the Life Support members.
- Ali: One of the Life Support members
- Pam: One of the Life Support members
- Sue: One of the Life Support members.
- In Larson's script, the roles of all of the Life Support members are encouraged to take on the name that someone in the cast (or production) knows or has known to have succumbed to AIDS. In the final Broadway performance, Sue is renamed Lisa.
- Squeegee Man: A homeless person who chants "Honest living!" over and over during "Christmas Bells".
- The Waiter: A waiter at Life Cafe.
- The Woman with Bags or Homeless Woman: A woman who calls Mark out for trying to use her to assuage his guilt during "On The Street".
- The Preacher or The Pastor: The Preacher kicks Collins out of the church because he can't pay for Angel's funeral.

There are also many other non-named roles such as Cops, Bohemians, Vendors, Homeless People.

In professional productions, all the minor characters are played by the seven members of the ensemble. The usual doubling is as follows:

- Mark's Mother/Pam
- Mrs. Jefferson/Woman with Bags/Coat Vendor/Mimi's Mother/Ali/Seasons of Love Soloist
- Alexi Darling/Roger's Mother/Sue
- Mr. Jefferson/Christmas Caroler/Preacher/Seasons of Love Soloist
- Gordon/The Man/Mr. Grey
- Steve/Waiter/Squeegee Man
- Paul/Cop/Vendor

== Casts and characters ==
Character	Workshop Reading	Off-Broadway Workshop	Broadway	West End	West End Revival
Character	1993	1994	1996	1998	2026
Mark Cohen	James Bohanek	Anthony Rapp	Anthony Rapp	Anthony Rapp	Gaten Matarazzo
Roger Davis	Tony Hoylen	Tony Hoylen	Adam Pascal	Adam Pascal	Travis Ross
Mimi Márquez	Chiara Peacock	Daphne Rubin-Vega	Daphne Rubin-Vega	Krysten Cummings	Alexa Lopez
Tom Collins	Jon Cavaluzzo	Pat Briggs	Jesse L. Martin	Jesse L. Martin	Billy Nevers
Angel Dumott Schunard	Coco Peru	Mark Setlock	Wilson Jermaine Heredia	Wilson Jermaine Heredia	Jeevan Braich
Maureen Johnson	Karen Oberlin	Sarah Knowlton	Idina Menzel	Jessica Tezier	Lazy Violet
Joanne Jefferson	Nancy O'Connor (Note: In the 1993 reading, the character was named Joanne Strudwick)	Shelley Dickinson	Fredi Walker	Jacqui Dubois	Danielle Fiamanya
Benjamin Coffin III	Rusty Magee	Michael Potts	Taye Diggs	Bonny Lockhart	Joaquin Pedro Valdes

=== Additional 1993 workshop cast members ===
- Bob Golden as Rudy Ramirez
- Bambi Jones as Mrs. Chance
- David Levine as Dogman
- Rusty Magee as Congressman Otam A. DeSnofla

=== Notable replacements ===
==== Broadway (1996–2008) ====
- Mark Cohen: Matt Caplan, Joey Fatone, Christopher Hanke, Adam Kantor, Drew Lachey, Tony Vincent, Gilles Chiasson (u/s), David Driver (u/s), Sebastian Arcelus (u/s), Richard H. Blake (u/s), Norbert Leo Butz (u/s), Will Chase (u/s), Luther Creek (u/s), Colin Hanlon (u/s), Chad Richardson (u/s)
- Roger Davis: Sebastian Arcelus, Declan Bennett, Richard H. Blake, Norbert Leo Butz, Will Chase, Luther Creek, Tim Howar, Jeremy Kushnier, Gilles Chiasson (u/s), David Driver (u/s), Colin Hanlon (u/s), Chad Richardson (u/s), Tony Vincent (u/s)
- Mimi Márquez: Mel B, Renée Elise Goldsberry, Tamyra Gray, Marcy Harriell, Jaime Lee Kirchner, Antonique Smith, Lorraine Vélez, Lisa Simone (u/s), Yassmin Alers (u/s), Karen Olivo (u/s), Shayna Steele (u/s), Caren Lyn Tackett (u/s)
- Tom Collins: Alan Mingo Jr., Troy Horne, Michael McElroy, Darius de Haas (u/s)
- Angel Dumott Schunard: Wilson Cruz, Jose Llana, Jai Rodriguez, Mark Setlock (u/s), Darius de Haas (u/s), Telly Leung (u/s), Andy Señor Jr. (u/s), Robin de Jesús (u/s)
- Maureen Johnson: Carla Bianco, Jessica Boevers, Eden Espinosa, Kelly Karbacz, Tamara Podemski, Sherie Rene Scott, Yassmin Alers (u/s), Karen Olivo (u/s), Antonique Smith (u/s), Caren Lyn Tackett (u/s)
- Joanne Jefferson: Natalie Venetia Belcon, Merle Dandridge, Tracie Thoms, Lisa Simone (u/s), Frenchie Davis (u/s), Shayna Steele (u/s)
- Benjamin Coffin III: Rodney Hicks, Darius de Haas (u/s)

==== 1st, 2nd & 3rd US National Tours (1996–2010) ====
- Mark Cohen: Luther Creek, Neil Patrick Harris, Matt Caplan, Kristoffer Cusick (u/s), Curtis Cregan (u/s), Josh Strickland (u/s), Aaron Tveit (u/s), Brandon Uranowitz (u/s)
- Roger Davis: Jeremy Kushnier, Adrian Lewis Morgan, Curtis Cregan (u/s), Josh Strickland (u/s), Aaron Tveit (u/s), John Partridge, Norbert Leo Butz
- Mimi Márquez: Lisa Simone, Sharon Leal, Karen Olivo, Yassmin Alers, Saycon Sengbloh, Lexi Lawson, Caren Lyn Tackett (u/s)
- Tom Collins: Michael McElroy
- Angel Dumott Schunard: Wilson Cruz, Kristoffer Cusick, Andy Señor Jr., Telly Leung (u/s)
- Maureen Johnson: Carrie Hamilton, Amy Spanger, Carla Bianco, Yassmin Alers (u/s), Anika Larsen (u/s), Caren Lyn Tackett (u/s)
- Joanne Jefferson: Haneefah Wood, Merle Dandridge
- Benjamin Coffin III: Brian M. Love

== Musical numbers ==
Act 1

- "Tune Up #1" – Mark, Roger
- "Voice Mail #1" – Mark's Mother
- "Tune Up #2" – Mark, Roger, Collins, Benny
- "Rent" – Mark, Roger, Collins, Benny, Joanne, and Company
- "You Okay Honey?" – Christmas Caroler, Angel, Collins
- "Tune Up #3" – Mark, Roger
- "One Song Glory" – Roger
- "Light My Candle" – Mimi, Roger
- "Voice Mail #2" – Mr. and Mrs. Jefferson
- "Today 4 U" – Collins, Roger, Mark, Angel
- "You'll See" – Benny, Mark, Roger, Collins, Angel
- "Tango: Maureen" – Joanne, Mark
- "Life Support" – Paul, Gordon, Steve, Ali, Pam, Sue, Angel, Collins, Mark, Roger
- "Out Tonight" – Mimi
- "Another Day" – Mimi, Roger, Ensemble
- "Will I?" – Steve and Company
- "On the Street" – Christmas Carolers, Squeegee Man, Mark, Collins, Angel, Homeless Woman, Cops
- "Santa Fe" – Collins, Angel, Mark, Ensemble
- "I'll Cover You" – Angel, Collins
- "We're Okay" – Joanne
- "Christmas Bells" – Christmas Carolers, Saleswoman, Collins, Angel, Mark, Roger, Cops, The Man, Mimi, Benny, Company
- "Over the Moon" – Maureen
- "La Vie Bohème A" – Waiter, Mark, Roger, Collins, Benny, Mimi, Angel, Maureen, Joanne, Mr. Grey, and Company
- "I Should Tell You" – Mimi, Roger
- "La Vie Bohème B" – Joanne, Maureen, Mark, Angel, Collins, and Company

Act 2

- "Seasons of Love A" – Company
- "Happy New Year A" – Mimi, Roger, Mark, Maureen, Joanne, Collins, Angel
- "Voice Mail #3" – Mark's Mother, Alexi Darling
- "Happy New Year B" – Maureen, Mark, Joanne, Roger, Mimi, Collins, Angel, Benny, The Man
- "Take Me or Leave Me" – Maureen, Joanne
- "Seasons of Love B" – Company
- "Without You" – Roger, Mimi
- "Voice Mail #4" – Alexi Darling
- "Contact" – Company
- "I'll Cover You (Reprise)" – Collins and Company
- "Halloween" – Mark
- "Goodbye Love" – Mimi, Roger, Benny, Maureen, Joanne, Mark, Collins
- "What You Own" – Mark, Roger
- "Voice Mail #5" – Roger's Mother, Mimi's Mother, Mr. Jefferson, Mark's Mother
- "Finale A" – Homeless People, Mark, Roger, Collins, Maureen, Joanne, Mimi
- "Your Eyes" – Roger
- "Finale B" – Roger, Mimi, Company

== Reception ==
Rent received several awards including a Pulitzer Prize and four Tony Awards.

Critical reception of Rent was positive not only for its acting and musical components, but also for its representation of HIV-positive individuals. Many critics praised the portrayal of characters such as Angel and Collins as being happy, with positive outlooks on life, rather than being resigned to death. While critics and theatre patrons had largely positive reviews of the show, it was criticized for the "glamourization" of the East Village in the late 1980s and its stereotypically negative portrayal of lesbian characters.

Billy Aronson said, "For the record, although I was ambivalent about Jonathan's ideas for Rent when we were working together on it, I have come to love the show. And as tragic as it is that he didn't live to see his work become a huge success, I believe he knew it would be. In our last conversation I asked how the show was going and he said, with complete assurance, that it was incredible."

== Cultural impact and legacy ==
The song "Seasons of Love" became a successful pop song and often is performed on its own. Because of its connection to the New Year and looking back at times past, it is sometimes performed at graduations or school holiday programs.

=== RENT-heads ===
Rent gathered a following of fans who refer to themselves as "RENT-heads". The name originally referred to people who would camp out at the Nederlander Theater for hours in advance for the discounted $20 rush tickets to each show, though it generally refers to anyone who is obsessed with the show. These discounted tickets were for seats in the first two rows of the theater reserved for sale by lottery two hours prior to each show. Other Broadway shows have followed Rent's example and now also offer cheaper tickets in efforts to make Broadway theater accessible to people who would otherwise be unable to afford the ticket prices.

=== Popular culture references ===
The film Team America: World Police features main protagonist Gary Johnston, who plays a lead role in Lease, a Broadway musical parody of Rent, and is seen performing the musical number "Everyone Has AIDS". In 2017, the song "Out Tonight" was covered by the characters Josie and the Pussycats in an episode of the television series Riverdale. Satirist Randy Rainbow parodied "Seasons of Love" as "Seasons of Trump" for his 2021 look back at the Trump administration, and "Tango: Maureen" as "Tango: Vaccine" to highlight purveyors of COVID-19 misinformation.

Rent has also been referenced in other musicals. Yitzhak in Hedwig and the Angry Inch wears a Rent T-shirt and speaks of his aspiration to play the role of Angel. The off-Broadway musical revue Forbidden Broadway Strikes Back includes parodies of Rent songs such as "Rant" ("Rent"), "Ouch! They're Tight" ("Out Tonight"), "Season of Hype" ("Seasons of Love"), "Too Gay 4 U (Too Het'ro 4 Me)" ("Today 4 U"), "Pretty Voices Singing" ("Christmas Bells") and "This Ain't Boheme" ("La Vie Bohème"). Lin-Manuel Miranda, the composer and writer of the Broadway show Hamilton, has cited Rent as a main source of inspiration. He also referenced the show in a verse of the song "Wrote My Way Out" on The Hamilton Mixtape in the line "Running out of time like I'm Jonathan Larson's rent check".

== Productions ==
=== Workshops and Off-Broadway production ===
Rent had its first staged reading at New York Theatre Workshop in March 1993. A further two-week New York Theatre Workshop version was performed in 1994 starring Anthony Rapp as Mark and Daphne Rubin-Vega as Mimi, and more workshops followed. The show opened in 1996, again at New York Theatre Workshop, and quickly gained popularity off-Broadway, receiving enthusiastic reviews. The New York Times theater critic Ben Brantley called it an "exhilarating, landmark rock opera" with a "glittering, inventive score" that "shimmers with hope for the future of the American musical." Another reviewer wrote, "Rent speaks to Generation X the way that the musical Hair spoke to the baby boomers or those who grew up in the 1960s," while the New York Times similarly called it "a rock opera for our time, a Hair for the 90s." The show proved extremely successful off-Broadway, selling out all of its performances at the 150-seat theatre.

=== Original Broadway production ===
Due to its overwhelming popularity and the need for a larger theater, Rent moved to Broadway's previously derelict Nederlander Theatre on 41st Street on April 29, 1996. On Broadway, the show achieved critical acclaim and word-of-mouth popularity. The production's ethnically diverse principal cast originally included Taye Diggs, Wilson Jermaine Heredia, Jesse L. Martin, Idina Menzel, Adam Pascal, Anthony Rapp, Daphne Rubin-Vega and Fredi Walker.

The production's controversial topics and innovative pricing, including same day-of-performance $20 tickets, helped to increase the popularity of musical theater amongst the younger generation. The production was nominated for ten Tony Awards in 1996 and won four: Best Musical, Best Book, Best Original Score and Best Performance by a Featured Actor in a Musical (Heredia).

On April 24, 2006, the original Broadway cast reunited for a one-night performance of the musical at the Nederlander Theatre. This performance raised over $2,000,000 for the Jonathan Larson Performing Arts Foundation, Friends In Deed and New York Theatre Workshop. Former cast members were invited, and many from prior tours and former Broadway casts appeared, performing an alternate version of "Seasons of Love" as the finale of the performance.

Rent closed on September 7, 2008, after a 12-year run and 5,123 performances, making it the seventh-longest-running Broadway show at that time, and currently the twelfth-longest-running Broadway show. The production grossed over $280 million.

Original cast ensemble members Rodney Hicks and Gwen Stewart returned to the cast at the time of the Broadway closing. Hicks played Benny and Stewart played the role she created, the soloist in the song "Seasons of Love". In addition, actress Tracie Thoms joined the cast at the end of the run playing Joanne, the role she portrayed in the 2005 film version. The last Broadway performance was filmed and screened in movie theaters as Rent: Filmed Live on Broadway in September 2008. It was released on DVD and Blu-ray formats on February 3, 2009.

=== North American touring productions ===
Successful United States national tours, the "Angel Tour" and the "Benny Tour", launched in the 1990s. Later, the non-Equity tour started its run. There was also a Canadian tour (often referred to as the "Collins Tour").

The Angel tour began in November 1996 at the Shubert Theatre in Boston, where it ran for approximately six months. Anthony Rapp joined the cast for the Chicago run, and Daphne Rubin-Vega joined for the Los Angeles run. The tour finished in San Francisco in September 1999. Other members of the Angel cast included Carrie Hamilton, Amy Spanger, Luther Creek, Kristoffer Cusick, Lisa Simone, Queen Esther, and Tony Vincent.

The Benny Tour began in July 1997 in San Diego, California, at the LaJolla Playhouse. Michael Greif, the original director of the Broadway show was also the artistic director of the LaJolla Playhouse and was instrumental in arranging for the Benny tour to begin in the smaller city of San Diego rather than Los Angeles, California. It originally featured Neil Patrick Harris as Mark Cohen in his first musical theatre role. The Benny tour generally played shorter stops and often-smaller markets than the Angel Tour did. Other cast members included Wilson Cruz and d'Monroe.

Tours ran each season from 2005 to 2008. Cast members throughout the run included Aaron Tveit, Ava Gaudet, Declan Bennett, Rebecca Naomi Jones, Constantine Maroulis, Dan Rosenbaum, Heinz Winckler, Anwar Robinson, Christine Dwyer, Caissie Levy and Karen Olivo. In 2009, a national tour starring Adam Pascal and Anthony Rapp, reprising their original Broadway roles, launched in Cleveland, Ohio. Original Broadway Cast member Gwen Stewart also appeared, alongside Michael McElroy as Collins, The tour ended on February 7, 2010, in Sacramento, California. A 20th anniversary non-Equity touring production began in Bloomington, Indiana on September 12, 2016, and ran through March 1, 2020. A 25th anniversary non-Equity tour kicked off on September 30, 2021, at the Carson Center in Paducah, Kentucky.

=== UK productions ===
The show made its UK premiere on April 21, 1998, at the West End's Shaftesbury Theatre and officially opened on May 12, 1998. The original cast included Krysten Cummings as Mimi Marquez, Wilson Jermaine Heredia as Angel Schunard, Bonny Lockhart as Benny, Jesse L. Martin as Tom Collins, Adam Pascal as Roger Davis, Anthony Rapp as Mark Cohen, and Jessica Tezier as Maureen Johnson. The show closed on October 30, 1999, after one-and-a-half years. Limited revivals took place at the Prince of Wales Theatre from December 4, 2001, to January 26, 2002; December 6, 2002, to March 8, 2003 (featuring Adam Rickett as Mark and Caprice as Maureen). There was also a successful production for a limited run in Manchester in 2006 with an additional 'goodbye' performance in 2008 from the Manchester cast.

On October 16, 2007, the heavily revised production titled Rent Remixed opened at the Duke of York's Theatre in London's West End. Directed by William Baker, it was set in the present day. The cast included Oliver Thornton (Mark), Luke Evans (Roger), Craig Stein (Benny), Leon Lopez (Collins), Francesca Jackson (Joanne), Jay Webb (Angel), Siobhán Donaghy (Mimi), and Denise Van Outen (Maureen). From December 24, 2007, the role of Maureen was played by Jessie Wallace. The production received generally unfavorable reviews. The Guardian gave it only one out of five stars, writing, "They call this 'Rent Remixed'. I'd dub it 'Rent Reduced', in that the late Jonathan Larson's reworking of La Bohème, while never a great musical, has been turned into a grisly, synthetic, pseudo pop concert with no particular roots or identity." The production closed on February 2, 2008.

The production radically altered elements of the musical including defining the characters of Mimi, Angel and Mark as British. Songs were reordered (including Maureen's first appearance as the Act I finale). The rehaul of the score was masterminded by Steve Anderson and featured radically rearranged versions of Out Tonight, Today 4 U, Over the Moon and Happy New Year.

A one-off Rent - The 20th Anniversary Concert was held at the Blackpool Opera house Monday November 11, 2013. A 20th anniversary tour opened at Theatr Clwyd in October 2016 before playing a two-month run at the St James Theatre, London. The cast included Layton Williams as Angel and Lucie Jones as Maureen. The production then continued to tour the UK.

In 2018 an immersive production of RENT premiered at Frogmore Paper Mill in Apsley, Hemel Hempstead. The cast included Aran Macrae (Roger), Connor Dyer (Mark) and Lizzie Emery (Mimi). The show opened on July 10, 2018, and ran until July 28.

The Hope Mill Theatre revival, originally scheduled for late July 2020, ran from October 30 to December 6 after COVID-19-related delays. Due to the ongoing pandemic, the audience was socially distanced and measures were in place around the theatre. The cast included Blake Patrick Anderson (Mark), Tom Francis (Roger), Maiya Quansah-Breed (Mimi), Dom Hartley-Harris (Collins), Alex Thomas-Smith (Angel), Millie O'Connell (Maureen), Jocasta Almgill (Joanne), and Ahmed Hamad (Benny). The production was professionally filmed, which was broadcast from November 27 to December 20 on weekends.

In 2023, the musical was revived at the Edinburgh Fringe Festival for a sold out, acclaimed run at Paradise St Augustine's Theatre. The cast included Ethan Baird (Mark), Nick Tomlinson (Roger), Freya Rivero (Mimi), Andrew Gardiner (Collins), Rory McKeon (Angel), Nicola Alexander (Maureen), Felicity Halfpenny (Joanne), and Greg McAfferty (Benny). This production was nominated for an Offie for Best [Regional] Musical.

A new production began previews at the Tom Stoppard Theatre on September 26, 2026, thirty years after the show reached Broadway, and opened on October 8; in October its run was extended to May 29, 2027. It is directed by Luke Sheppard, who staged the musical at Manchester's Hope Mill Theatre in 2020, with choreography by Tom Jackson Greaves, set design by David Woodhead, costumes by Gabriella Slade, lighting by Howard Hudson and sound by Paul Gatehouse. Gaten Matarazzo played Mark in his West End debut, with Travis Ross as Roger, Alexa Lopez as Mimi, Billy Nevers as Tom Collins, Jeevan Braich as Angel, Lazy Violet as Maureen, Danielle Fiamanya as Joanne and Joaquin Pedro Valdes as Benny. Bella Brown was originally cast as Mimi but withdrew with an injury.

=== Off-Broadway revival ===
The show was revived off-Broadway at Stage 1 of New World Stages with previews starting July 14, 2011, and a scheduled opening of August 11, 2011. This was the first New York Revival of the show since the original production closed less than three years earlier. The production was directed by Rent's original director Michael Greif. Almost the entire show was different from the original, yet the reinvention did not please the critics, who complained that the new actors did not have a feel for the characters they were playing and that it made the show feel contrived. Throughout the run, the cast featured Annaleigh Ashford and Emma Hunton as Maureen, Adam Chanler-Berat and Josh Grisetti as Mark, Nicholas Christopher and Brandon Victor Dixon as Collins, Ephraim Sykes as Benjamin, and MJ Rodriguez as Angel. The off-Broadway production of Rent closed on September 9, 2012.

=== Additional productions ===
In 1999, an Australian production featured Justin Smith as Mark, Rodger Corser as Roger and Christine Anu as Mimi. The tour began in Sydney and finished in Melbourne. A production in Perth, Western Australia was mounted in 2007 and featured Anthony Callea as Mark, Tim Campbell as Roger, Courtney Act as Angel and Nikki Webster as Maureen. Another Australian production began in Brisbane in January 2024 and ended in Canberra in June 2024. The cast features Nick Afoa as Collins, Martha Berhane as Mimi, Carl De Villa as Angel, Tana Laga'aia as Benny, Noah Mullins as Mark, Calista Nelmes as Maureen, Jerrod Smith as Roger, and Thndo as Joanne. A Sydney production based on this tour is currently playing at the Sydney Opera House, which began in September 2025, and will end in October. The Sydney cast features Jesse Dutlow as Angel, Googoorewon Knox as Collins, Tana Laga'aia as Benny, Calista Nelmes as Maureen, Kristin Paulse as Mimi, Henry Rollo as Mark, Harry Targett as Roger, and Imani Williams as Joanne.

The Dublin production had an extended run at the Olympia Theatre, Dublin in 2000. It starred Sean Pol McGreevy as Mark, Rachel Tucker as Maureen and Allyson Brown as Mimi under the direction of Phil Willmot.

The Swedish production premiered in January, 2001 at Göta Lejon, Sweden, with an extensive national tour the following year. Sarah Dawn Finer played Joanne. The first Swedish production had an altered ending, later productions has kept the original ending.

Rent veteran Neil Patrick Harris directed a production at the Hollywood Bowl in Los Angeles, CA. The production played a three night engagement, August 6–8, 2010. The cast included Vanessa Hudgens as Mimi, Aaron Tveit as Roger, Skylar Astin as Mark, Wayne Brady as Collins, Telly Leung as Angel, Tracie Thoms as Joanne, Nicole Scherzinger as Maureen, Collins Pennie as Benny, and Gwen Stewart as Seasons of Love soloist (and additional roles).

In 2017, the first tour for the German speaking countries was mounted by Berlin theatrical producer Boris Hilbert. The leading German musical theatre magazine musicals - Das Musicalmagazin described the production as "in terms of vocal quality, the performance was one of the best that has ever been seen in Germany" (issue 188 of Dec 2017). The show traveled Germany, Austria and Switzerland and was directed by the British opera director Walter Sutcliffe.

In 2026, a second off-broadway revival will perform at A.R.T./New York Theatres. Directed by Travis Burbee and Cassidy Kaye, the EPIC Players' production will feature “an almost entirely neurodiverse and disabled cast,” starring Eric Fegan (Mark), Conor Tague (Roger), Genesis Solivan (Mimi), Jocelyn Elena Stout (Maureen), Lai Williams (Joanne), Joshua Cartagena (Angel), Cameron Walker (Collins), and Hunter Hollingsworth (Benny). The production was originally slated for an two-week engagement, opening on June 4th, 2026 and closing on June 14th, 2026, yet due to pre-opening ticket sales, the run was extended to June 20th, 2026 with an added preview performance on June 3rd.

=== Rent: School Edition ===
In 2007, an abridged edition of Rent was made available to five non-professional acting groups in the United States for production, primarily adapted by Jennifer and Peter Jones of Stuart, Florida's StarStruck Theatre. Billed as Rent: School Edition, this version omits the song "Contact" and eliminates some of the coarse language and tones down some public displays of affection in the original. Shorewood High School in Shorewood, Wisconsin, became the first high school to perform an early version of the adaptation in May 2006. The high school was selected to present a workshop performance as part of Music Theatre International's work to adapt the musical for younger actors and potentially more conservative audiences. As of 2008, Music Theatre International began licensing "Rent School Edition" for performances by schools and non-professional amateur theaters in the United States and around the world.

=== International productions ===
Rent has been performed in over 40 countries and regions around the world, including Denmark, Estonia, Finland, Iceland, Norway, Sweden, Belgium, the Netherlands, Ireland, United Kingdom, France, Germany, Switzerland, Portugal, Spain, Italy, Hungary, Poland, Slovakia, Greece, Canada, the United States, Mexico, Panama, Bolivia, Brazil, Argentina, Russia, China, Hong Kong, South Korea, Taiwan, Japan, Philippines, Singapore, Thailand, South Africa, Australia, Guam, New Zealand, Israel, Puerto Rico, Austria, Peru, Trinidad and Tobago, Dominican Republic, Cuba, Czech Republic, Colombia, Turkey and Guatemala.

The musical has been performed in 26 languages, including Danish, Estonian, Finnish, Icelandic, Norwegian, Swedish, Dutch, English, French, German, Portuguese, Spanish, Italian, Hungarian, Polish, Slovak, Greek, Russian, Mandarin Chinese, Cantonese Chinese, Korean, Japanese, Hebrew, Czech, Turkish, and Catalan.

== Recordings ==
=== Rent (Original Broadway Cast Recording) ===
A cast recording of the original Broadway cast recording was released in 1996; it features all the music of the show on a double-disc "complete recording" collection along with a remixed version of the song "Seasons of Love" featuring Stevie Wonder. A second one-disc album was released in 1999 containing highlights from the original cast album.

=== Rent: Original Motion Picture Soundtrack ===
The 2005 film version (see below) also resulted in a double-disc cast recording of the complete score used in the movie. The two-disc soundtrack, contained 28 tracks, and was originally packaged in eight different slipcovers, each featuring one of the eight most prominent characters in the film.

=== Rent (Original Soundtrack of the Fox Live Television Event) ===
The 2019 Fox Live Television Event, featuring Jordan Fisher as Mark and Brennin Hunt as Roger, directed by Micheal Greif and Alex Rudzinski and performed at Fox Studios, was recorded and is available to listen to on Spotify.

=== Other recordings ===
There are also many foreign cast recordings of international productions of the show.

== Adaptations ==
=== Film ===
In 2005, Rent was adapted into a movie directed by Chris Columbus with a screenplay by Stephen Chbosky. With the exception of Daphne Rubin-Vega (who was pregnant at the time of filming) and Fredi Walker (who felt she was too old for her role), who played Mimi and Joanne respectively, the original Broadway cast members reprised the principal roles. Released on November 23, 2005, the film remained in the box office top ten for three weeks, receiving mixed reviews. Several plot elements were changed slightly, and some songs were changed to spoken dialogue or cut entirely for the film. The soundtrack was produced by Rob Cavallo, engineered by Doug McKean and features session musicians Jamie Muhoberac, Tim Pierce and Dorian Crozier.

=== Rent: Filmed Live on Broadway ===
The final performance of the Broadway production of Rent, which took place on September 7, 2008, was filmed live and, cut together with close-up footage from a day of filming in August of the same year, was released as Rent: Filmed Live on Broadway in cinemas with high definition digital projection systems in the U.S. and Canada between September 24 and 28, 2008. Rent: Filmed Live on Broadway was released on February 3, 2009, on DVD & Blu-ray formats.

=== Rent: Live ===
In May 2017, Fox announced plans to air a live television production of Rent. It aired Sunday, January 27, 2019, and starred Jordan Fisher as Mark, Brennin Hunt as Roger, Tinashe as Mimi, Brandon Victor Dixon as Tom, Valentina as Angel, Vanessa Hudgens as Maureen, Kiersey Clemons as Joanne, and Mario as Benny. While the filmed version was billed as a live-to-the-public performance, Brennin Hunt, who played Roger, broke his foot before the final act, and the network was forced to air an earlier dress rehearsal of act 2.

== Related documentaries ==
=== No Day But Today: The Story of Rent ===
Jeffrey Schwarz directed this 2006 documentary about the musical Rent, from Jonathan Larson's original idea to his death and, finally, to the adaptation of Rent into a major motion picture. The nearly two-hour documentary was included in a two-disc special edition of the DVD release of the 2005 film.

=== Revolution Rent ===
Filmmaker and Rent alumnus Andy Señor Jr. produced this documentary, following his journey producing the musical in Cuba in late 2014. This production of Rent was the first Broadway musical to premiere in Cuba since diplomatic relations between the two countries became strained during the Cold War. The documentary was released March 13, 2020.

== Awards and honors ==
=== Original Broadway production ===
Year	Award	Category	Nominee	Outcome
1996	Tony Award	Best Musical		Won
1996	Tony Award	Best Book of a Musical	Jonathan Larson	Won
1996	Tony Award	Best Original Score	Jonathan Larson	Won
1996	Tony Award	Best Performance by a Leading Actor in a Musical	Adam Pascal	Nominated
1996	Tony Award	Best Performance by a Leading Actress in a Musical	Daphne Rubin-Vega	Nominated
1996	Tony Award	Best Performance by a Featured Actor in a Musical	Wilson Jermaine Heredia	Won
1996	Tony Award	Best Performance by a Featured Actress in a Musical	Idina Menzel	Nominated
1996	Tony Award	Best Direction of a Musical	Michael Greif	Nominated
1996	Tony Award	Best Choreography	Marlies Yearby	Nominated
1996	Tony Award	Best Lighting Design	Blake Burba	Nominated
1996	Drama Desk Award	Outstanding Musical		Won
1996	Drama Desk Award	Outstanding Book of a Musical	Jonathan Larson	Won
1996	Drama Desk Award	Outstanding Actor in a Musical	Adam Pascal	Nominated
1996	Drama Desk Award	Outstanding Actress in a Musical	Daphne Rubin-Vega	Nominated
1996	Drama Desk Award	Outstanding Featured Actor in a Musical	Wilson Jermaine Heredia	Won
1996	Drama Desk Award	Outstanding Director of a Musical	Michael Greif	Nominated
1996	Drama Desk Award	Outstanding Orchestrations	Steve Skinner	Won
1996	Drama Desk Award	Outstanding Lyrics	Jonathan Larson	Won
1996	Drama Desk Award	Outstanding Music	Jonathan Larson	Won
1996	Drama Desk Award	Outstanding Costume Design	Angela Wendt	Nominated
1996	Pulitzer Prize for Drama			Won
1996	Theatre World Award		Adam Pascal	Won
1996	Theatre World Award		Daphne Rubin-Vega	Won
1996	Outer Critics Circle Award	Outstanding New Off-Broadway Musical		Won
1996	New York Drama Critics' Circle Award	Best Musical		Won
1997	Grammy Award	Best Musical Show Album		Nominated

=== Original West End production ===
Year	Award	Category	Nominee	Result
1999	Laurence Olivier Award	Best New Musical		Nominated
1999	Laurence Olivier Award	Best Actress in a Musical	Krysten Cummings	Nominated
1999	Laurence Olivier Award	Best Performance in a Supporting Role in a Musical	Wilson Jermaine Heredia	Nominated
