= Chad Richardson =

Canadian musician

- Born: Andrew Chad Richardson; St. John's, Newfoundland and Labrador, Canada
- Origin: Montreal, Quebec, Canada
- Genres: Rock
- Occupation: Music Consultant

Chad Richardson is a Canadian musician from St. John's, Newfoundland, Canada. He released two rock albums on the Aquarius label in the 1990s. Richardson also starred in the Canadian production of the musical Rent, where he was nominated for a Dora Award.

== History ==
Richardson grew up in Conception Bay South. As a teenager, he was part of the band the Park Sharks. He attended chef school in Paris in the late 1980s.

While attending the music program at Concordia University in Montreal, Richardson won a nationwide search by HMV for Canada's "best undiscovered vocalist", which led to the recording of his first independent album 2 People. In 1997, Richardson won the Homegrown contest sponsored by Toronto radio station Q107. This led to the production of his second record, The Legends of Brud, which features eleven songs he wrote himself, and a record deal with Aquarius/EMI.

While recording The Legends of Brud, Richardson auditioned for the Canadian production of the musical Rent, landing the lead role of Mark Cohen and soon after being nominated for a Dora Award for his performance. After the show's run he was transferred to the Broadway production. While in New York, he produced his third album no. 1 fan, and also appeared as a young David Bowie in the video for "The Pretty Things Are Going to Hell".

Richardson was one half of the production/songwriting team jACK (along with partner Craig McConnell). The pair won the USA Songwriting Competition for best R&B song in 2002. As jACK the pair also has releases by Canadian R and B artist Keshia Chante (HUSH) and multiple releases in Japan with artists such as Crystal Kay and Chemistry. jACK also had multiple TV and film placements.

In 2010 Richardson and Shaista Ahmed formed the TV production company, LATO Productions. LATO had its first TV property, The Health Hunters optioned to Temple Street Productions and continued on to the development phase.

In early 2011 Richardson was hired by ole music publishing as a Toronto Creative Manager. Later in 2011 he accepted a promotion to Creative Director of the Los Angeles office. While at ole Richardson signed rock icon Steven Tyler, super-producer Timbaland and songwriters and producers such as Allison Kaplan, Mynority and Clare Reynolds. In 2014 Richardson moved over to Canada's PRO SOCAN to head up Los Angeles operations as GM of LA.

In 2018 he formed The S.O.N.G. Space, a networking community for artists and songwriters. In 2019 he opened his first art photography show, "People of The South Bay" focusing on the everyday people of the area of Los Angeles in which he lives, namely the South Bay.

== Discography ==
=== Singles ===
==== Various artists compilations ====
- 1996 Q107 Homegrown Album Volume 17 (MCA Records)

=== Albums ===
- 1995 2 People (reissue on Aquarius)
- 1997 The Legends of Brud (Aquarius/EMI)
- 2001 "no1fan"
