= Chain Link (film) =

- Directed by: Dylan Reynolds
- Written by: Dylan Reynolds
- Produced by: Dylan Reynolds
- Starring: Mark Irvingsen; Jim Storm; Yassmin Alers; Luciano Rauso; Jody Jaress
- Cinematography: Matt Gulley
- Edited by: Dylan Reynolds
- Music by: Fred Croft
- Production companies: Magnificent Mile Productions; Reality Productions
- Release date: 1 April 2008
- Running time: 98 minutes
- Country: United States
- Language: English

Chain Link is a 2008 American drama film directed by Dylan Reynolds, starring Mark Irvingsen, Jim Storm, Yassmin Alers, Luciano Rauso and Jody Jaress.

== Cast ==
- Mark Irvingsen as Anthony
- Jim Storm as Duncan
- Yassmin Alers as Jade
- Luciano Rauso as "Little Man"
- Jody Jaress as Rhea
- Peter Looney as Cromwell
- David Kallaway as Brian
- Lelia Goldoni as Floraine
- Jim Round as Officer O'Keefe

== Reception ==
Kristi Matsuda of LA Weekly wrote that while the script "sometimes slips into sentimentality and entertains the odd delusion of grandeur", the film "mostly presents a spare, refreshingly clear-eyed depiction of a deadbeat’s downward spiral."

Mark Keizer of Boxoffice Pro rated the film 3 stars out of 5 and wrote that while Reynolds "adds little to the conversation", his "close-to-the-bone rendering still draws you in, proving once again that movies begin and end with characters you care about."

Brad Wilke of Film Threat wrote that while the film "does a pretty good job of telling its story", it is "a shame that we’ve seen it all before."

Gary Goldstein of the Los Angeles Times wrote that while Reynolds "deserves credit for his confident, singular approach", his emphasis on "“performance over perfection in image” nets mixed results."

Robert Koehler of Variety wrote that the film "struggles to make a downhill life seem something more than just inevitable."
