= Lelia Goldoni =

American actress (1936–2023)

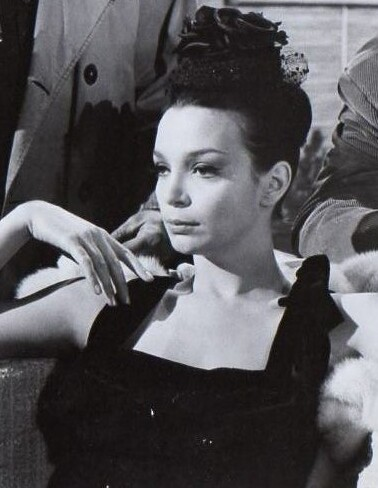
- Goldoni in Hysteria (1965)
- Born: Lelia Vita Rizzuto; October 1, 1936; New York City, U.S.
- Died: July 22, 2023 (aged 86); Englewood, New Jersey, U.S.
- Years active: 1949–2016
- Spouses: Ben Carruthers (div. 1960) Robert Rudelson (m. 1968)
- Children: 1

Lelia Vita Goldoni (nee Rizzuto; October 1, 1936 – July 22, 2023) was an American actress. She was best known for co-starring in John Cassavetes's groundbreaking independent film Shadows (1959). She received two BAFTA Award nominations throughout her career, the first for Shadows and the second for her performance in Martin Scorsese's Alice Doesn't Live Here Anymore (1974).

== Early life ==
Goldoni was born Lelia Vita Rizzuto in New York City and raised in Los Angeles, California. Her father was an Italian actor and she was a second cousin to baseball player Phil Rizzuto. She attended Los Angeles City College and was one of the Lester Horton Dancers in the 1950s.

== Career ==
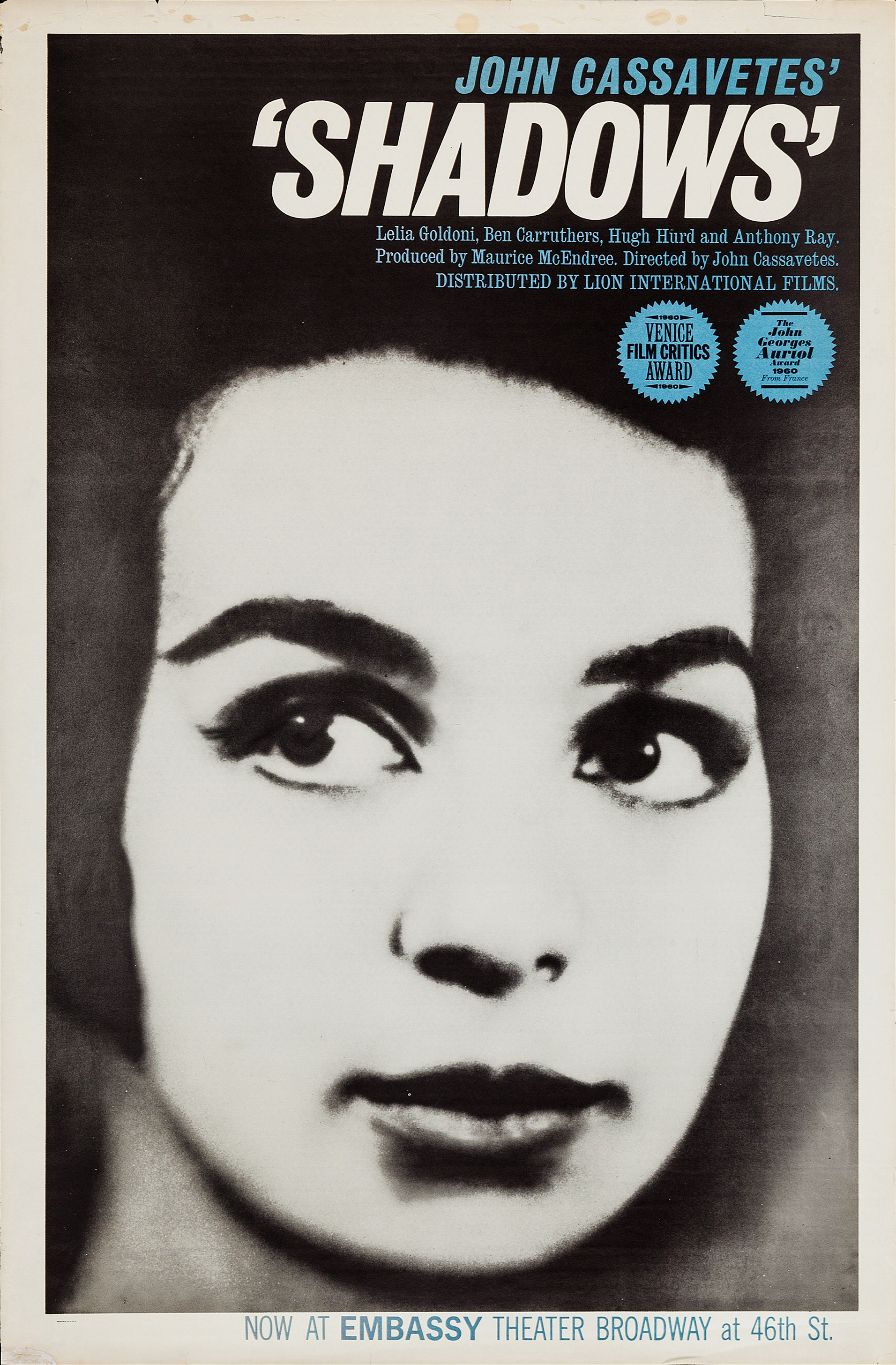
Goldoni in a poster for Shadows (1959)

Goldoni began her screen career as a child in the late 1940s with uncredited cameos in Joseph L. Mankiewicz's House of Strangers (1949) and John Huston's We Were Strangers (1949).

A decade later, after moving back to New York and meeting John Cassavetes in an acting workshop, Goldoni attracted considerable attention and critical acclaim for her performance in his groundbreaking film Shadows (1959). The film launched Goldoni's acting career, and earned her a BAFTA Award nomination for Most Promising Newcomer. The New York Times wrote that she "brings a freshness and a touching sort of natural gaucherie to the role of the girl."

Goldoni later co-starred in the episodes "Fair Exchange" and "Two Birds with One Bullet" of the British television series Danger Man (1964) with Patrick MacGoohan. She next starred as Denise James in the 1965 horror film Hysteria. In 1969, Goldoni appeared in The Italian Job and, in 1972, in an episode of the British sitcom “Doctor at Large”.

Goldoni attracted further acclaim and a second BAFTA Award nomination for portraying the best friend of Ellen Burstyn's character in Martin Scorsese's feature film Alice Doesn't Live Here Anymore (1974).

In 1975, she appeared in the historical drama film The Day of the Locust.

In 1978, she appeared in the horror film Invasion of the Body Snatchers and the coming-of-age film Bloodbrothers.

In 2010, she appeared in the drama film Chain Link. Two years later, her final performance was in the horror film The Devil Inside.

In addition to performing, Goldoni also taught acting throughout her life at various institutions, including the Lee Strasberg Theatre Institute, UCLA, and Hampshire College.

== Personal life ==
Goldoni was married twice, first to her Shadows co-star Ben Carruthers and then to writer Robert Rudelson. With Rudelson, she had a child named Aaron.

Goldoni is a second cousin of New York Yankees player Phil Rizzuto.

Goldoni died at the Actors Fund Home in Englewood, New Jersey, on July 22, 2023, at the age of 86.

== Partial filmography ==
Feature films
Year	Title	Role	Notes
1949	We Were Strangers	Consuelo Valdés	Uncredited
1949	House of Strangers	Italian Girl	Uncredited
1959	Shadows	Lelia	
1965	Hysteria	Denise James	
1967	Theatre of Death	Dani Gireaux	
1969	The Italian Job	Mrs. Beckerman	Uncredited
1974	Alice Doesn't Live Here Anymore	Bea	
1975	The Day of the Locust	Mary Dove	
1976	Baby Blue Marine	Mrs. Townsley	
1976	The Disappearance of Aimee	Sister Emma Shaffer	
1978	Bloodbrothers	Maria	
1978	Invasion of the Body Snatchers	Katherine Hendley	
1980	The Unseen	Virginia Keller	
1981	Choices	Jean Carluccio	
1981	Gangster Wars	Mrs. Lasker	
1985	Rainy Day Friends	Barbara Marti	
1994	Somebody to Love	Venice Waitress	
2000	A Constant Forge	Herself	
2008	Chain Link	Floraine	
2010	The Pacific	Dora Basilone	
2012	The Devil Inside	Susan Meadows	
