= Troy Horne =

American pop/rock musician, actor, and author

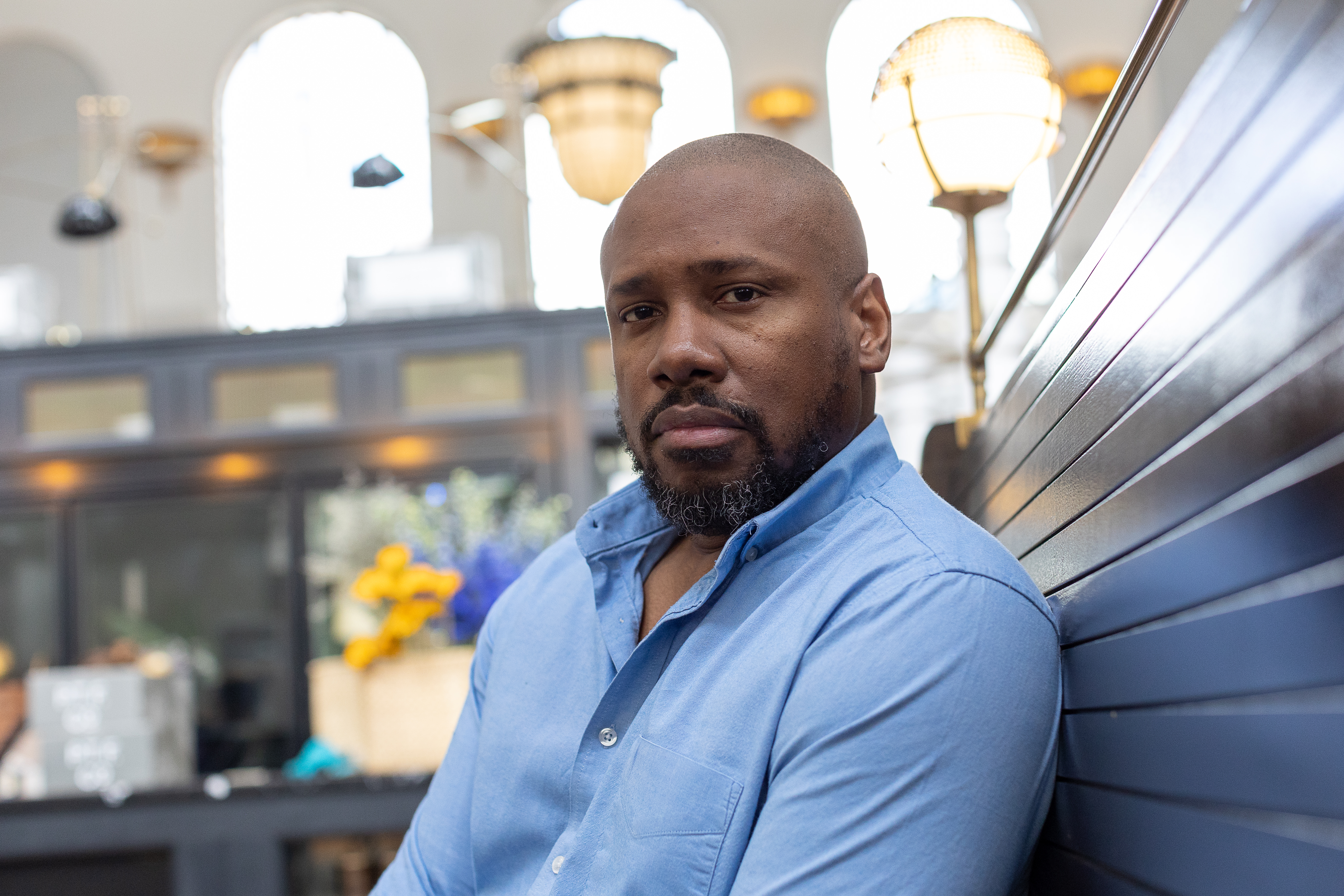

Background information
- Born: Troy Horne (1974-09-01)September 1, 1974 (age 52); Charlotte, North Carolina, U.S.
- Genres: Pop music, Rock music
- Occupations: Musician, actor, author, entrepreneur
- Website: www.troyhorne.com

Troy Horne is an American pop/rock musician, actor, and author who has starred in the Broadway show Rent, NBC’s The Sing Off, Star Search and the ION Networks Firebrand TV. He has been featured as a spokesperson and musical guest for personal development giant Nightingale Conant. Additionally, Troy has toured the world with his band Moses alongside Steve Miller (musician) and Gov’t Mule. Troy became a creative leader and band member of the a cappella band known as The House Jacks. He co-founded Colorado School of Acting; Colorado's only trade school for the performing arts. Troy is featured on Forbes Magazine and on ESPN's 2011 Monday Night Football musical opener. He's also profiled on MTV and ReverbNation.

== Early life and education ==
Troy Horne was born in Charlotte, North Carolina, to Katie and Moses Horne. His family subsequently relocated to Houston, Texas, where he was raised alongside his two sisters, Balissa and Aronika. Horne began performing music at a young age in church alongside his sisters.

He attended Westfield High School, where he sang under choir director Jean Galloway. Horne later attended Sam Houston State University from 1992 to 1995 on a full music scholarship under Kent Hatteberg. In 1995, he left Huntsville, Texas, to pursue a professional recording career.

== Music and theater career ==
Troy Horne takes delight in creating music. In 1998 he founded the Troy Horne band. In 2000, five years after leaving university, he signed with Jim Milligan’s Freedom Zone Records and was featured in Forbes Magazine during the Levi's Steve Miller Gov’t Mule Tour, which his band opened for and toured alongside.

In 2000, Troy's music was featured in the movie All About You (Faith Filmworks) which was written and directed by Christine Swanson and produced by Michael Swanson. The following year Troy created music for the film Thug Angel – A Tupac Shakur Documentary produced by QD3 entertainment. The music has created ongoing appreciation and recognition of his musical work.

While performing for The Walt Disney Company, including appearances in Disneyland's Christmas Fantasy Parades, Horne met a cappella arranger Deke Sharon. This led to Horne joining The House Jacks as a creative leader and performer. He also produced music for coach Tony Dungy's audio book Uncommon in 2009.

From 2007 to 2008 Troy was featured in the Broadway musical Rent as Tom Collins. Following his run in the show, Troy and his wife Elizabeth Karsell Horne relocated to Denver, Colorado, where they co-founded the Colorado School of Acting in 2009. Later in 2011, Troy Horne was featured in NBC’s The Sing Off (Season 3) in the ground-breaking a cappella hip hop group Urban Method.

=== Discography ===
Troy Horne has a catalogue of musical recordings which have been featured on music platforms including IMDb and RiverbNation. The table below chronicles some of the musical contributions included in his discography:

Year	Work
2001	All About You
2003	The Real Cancun
2005	ClubHouse
2005	Parental Control
2005-2012	Weeds/Showtime
2007	America’s Next Top Model, Engaged and Underaged
2009	Tribe
2010	Western Time Warp

His current album captioned I AM comes with a message of empowerment and personal celebration for the world.

== Publishing and podcasting ==
Horne is an author of youth sports and personal growth literature. He co-authored the book series Mental Toughness For Young Athletes alongside his son, Moses Horne. The self-published series has sold over 320,000 copies. Horne also hosts the HoopChalk Basketball Podcast.

=== Books ===
- Mental Toughness For Young Athletes: Eight Proven 5-Minute Mindset Exercises For Kids And Teens Who Play Competitive Sports
- Mental Toughness For Young Athletes (Parent’s Guide): Eight Proven 5-Minute Mindset Exercises For Kids And Teens Who Play Competitive Sports
- Mental Toughness For Young Athletes: Volume 2 Grit - How To Use The Secret Mindset Hack
- The AAU Basketball Bible: Everything You’d Better Know About Playing Youth Basketball And College Recruiting
- First Time Dad: An Expectant Father’s Weekly Guide To Pregnancy
- Middle Management: Finding Meaning, Clarity, and Success In The Second Half Of Life
- This Is Where It All Ends: From Broke Down To Boujee In 8 Unconventional Steps

== Personal life ==
Troy Horne married Elizabeth Karsell Horne in 2002. They have three children: Moses, Silas, and Cordelia.

== See also ==
- Rock music
- Pop music
- Country rock
