= EPIC Players =

Neurodivergent and disabled off-broadway theater company

- Industry: Musical theater, theater
- Founded: 25 August 2016
- Founder: Aubrie Therrien
- Headquarters: 138 South Oxford Street, Brooklyn, New York City, United States
- Number of locations: 2
- Area served: New York City, Los Angeles
- Key people: Aubrie Therrien (Executive and Artistic Director); Talia Eapen (Director of Program Operations)
- Services: Classes, Theatrical Productions, Cabarets
- Revenue: $753,854 (2026)
- Total assets: $427,145 (2026)
- Members: 250 (2026)
- Number of employees: 9 (2026)
- Website: Official Website

EPIC Players is a neuroinclusive non-profit theater company and theater educational institution. EPIC players consists of neurotypical and neurodivergent members. It is bicoastal, with one company in New York City and one in Los Angeles.

== History ==
EPIC was founded by Aubrie Therrien in 2016. EPIC celebrated its 10-year anniversary in September 2026. In 2026, EPIC has 250 members.

Every theater season, EPIC puts on multiple mainstage productions, cabarets, and concerts in addition to running classes for its members. Classes are free for its members. They rehearse and have classes at the A.R.T./NY South Oxford Space.

EPIC pairs each member with an EPIC Advocate to help support them in classes, auditions, and show preparation. The advocate is "another professional actor, teacher or coach."

Founded in 2023, EPIC Junior is a free program for New York middle and high schoolers. EPIC also expanded to Los Angeles in 2023.

=== Mainstage Productions ===
EPIC put on their first full-scale show, a production of Dog Sees God: Confessions of a Teenage Blockhead in mid-2017. Dog Sees God by Bert V. Royal is a dark reinterpretation of Peanuts and its characters. EPIC's second production was You're a Good Man, Charlie Brown. It premiered in November 2017 at the Flea Theater and was directed by Therrien. In March 2018, members of EPIC rang the opening bell of the New York Stock Exchange.

EPIC finished out its first season with a production of Shakespeare's The Tempest. Bedford and Bowery wrote that "EPIC Players’s version of The Tempest stands out in a way that feels genuinely notable" and that the neuroinclusive casting "adds a new layer to Shakespeare’s story of manipulation and sorcery."

For the 2018-2019 season, EPIC put on The Little Prince and Little Shop of Horrors. According to theater critic Cathy Hammer's review of the latter, EPIC's "production of Little Shop of Horrors radiates joy from its very roots, serving to shatter any preconceived notions held by uninitiated theater-goers."

For the 2019-2020 season, EPIC performed Peter and the Starcatcher at the HERE Arts Center. Jen Taphorn, in her review for My Entertainment World, wrote that the EPIC cast "along with the smooth direction of Travis Burbee and the creative props design by Wells Thorne, do an outstanding job of bringing the audience into their collective imagination as a plunger becomes a sword and a ladder transforms into a crocodile. Part of the magic is that you can feel the true passion and teamwork that went into this production."

In the 2021-2022 season, EPIC performed Almost, Maine and The 25th Annual Putnam County Spelling Bee.

In 2023, the first EPIC member starred in a Broadway musical. EPIC cast member Conor Tague played Tommy in the original cast of How to Dance in Ohio. Hunter Hollingsworth, a swing and understudy in How to Dance in Ohio, would later join EPIC.

In the 2022-2023 season, EPIC performed Tartuffe and Into the Woods. The 2023-2024 season consisted of Romeo and Juliet and Spring Awakening.

When explaining to Thinking Theater NYC why EPIC chose Spring Awakening, Assistant Director Gabe Girson said “Neurodiverse people go through sexual awakenings too. It is a universal show.” Therrien told the The Hollywood Reporter that "There are striking parallels with the disabled community and the characters from Spring Awakening, not only what they’ve gone through in terms of sexual abuse or disregard, but infantilization, the withholding and restricting information or restricting exploring aspects of the human condition.”

In the 2024-2025 season, EPIC presented A Christmas Carol and Seussical. EPIC also produced the world premiere of Dave Osmundsen's BUM BUM (or, this farce has Autism) in December 2025.

EPIC Players presented their first full-scale production in Los Angeles in May 2026. They put on a production of Peter and the Starcatcher.

EPIC began the 2025-2026 NYC season with a concert production of 504 the musical at Joe's Pub. It was followed up in 2026 with an off-broadway production of Rent.

EPIC will perform A Curious Incident of the Dog in the Nighttime to begin their 2026-2027 season.

== Productions ==
Show	First Performance	Last Performance	Location
Dog Sees God: Confessions of a Teenage Blockhead	July 27, 2017	August 6, 2017	The Kraine Theater
You're a Good Man, Charlie Brown	November 16, 2017	November 19, 2017	The Flea Theater
The Tempest	May 31, 2018	June 10, 2018	The Flea Theater
The Little Prince	November 10, 2018	November 18, 2018	The Flea Theater
Little Shop of Horrors	June 5, 2019	June 16, 2019	The Sheen Center for Thought and Culture
Peter and the Starcatcher	December 5, 2019	December 15, 2019	HERE Arts Center
She Kills Monsters: Virtual Realms	December 4, 2020	December 6, 2020	Virtual
Almost Maine	December 3, 2021	December 12, 2021	A.R.T./New York Theatres
The 25th Annual Putnam County Spelling Bee	May 12, 2022	May 22, 2022	A.R.T./New York Theatres
Tartuffe	December 1, 2022	December 11, 2022	A.R.T./New York Theatres
Into the Woods	June 8, 2023	June 18, 2023	A.R.T./New York Theatres
Romeo and Juliet	November 9, 2023	November 19, 2023	A.R.T./New York Theatres
Spring Awakening	May 9, 2024	May 19, 2024	A.R.T./New York Theatres
A Christmas Carol	December 10, 2024	December 15 2024	A.R.T./New York Theatres
Seussical the Musical	May 8, 2025	May 18, 2025	The Mezzanine Theatre
504 the Musical	August 3, 2025		Joe's Pub
Peter and the Starcatcher	May 14, 2026	May 17, 2026	Odyssey Theatre
Rent	June 4, 2026	June 20, 2026	A.R.T./New York Theatres
Curious Incident of the Dog in the Nighttime	November 20, 2026	December 6, 2026	The Mezzanine Theatre
504 the Musical	April 16, 2027	May 23, 2027	Theatre Row, Theatre 3

=== Cabarets and Concerts ===
- April 2, 2018 – Epic 4 Autism
- October 9, 2018 – EPIC Players: Songs About Ourselves
- September 22, 2019 – EPIC Players: Songs About Ourselves Live at Joe's Pub
- August 7, 2020 – EPIC's Big Summer Musical
- October 24, 2021 – EPIC Players: Epic Villains - A Wickedly Inclusive Cabaret
- April 2, 2022 – EPIC Heroes: Live at Lincoln Center
- October 22, 2022 – EPIC Players: Masquerade Ball
- April 2, 2023 – EPIC Sings for Autism: Let’s Duet
- October 10, 2023 – Once Upon A Cabaret
- February 21, 2024 – EPIC Underground: Storytellers
- April 2, 2024 – Miscast Cabaret
- July 22, 2024 – Greatest Summer Bops Cabaret
- October 26, 2024 – EPIC Does the 90’s: A Neurodivergent Costume Party Cabaret
- February 24, 2025 – The EPIC Underground: Passions & Appetites
- April 2, 2025 – EPIC Players: Dream Roles – A Neurodiverse Cabaret
- October 26, 2025 – Y2Kabaret
- March 22, 2026 – The EPIC Originals: Revolutions and Revelations
