= Carla Bianco =

American actress

Carla Bianco is an American singer-songwriter, pianist, and actor.

== Career ==
Of Italian descent, Carla Bianco grew up singing at family parties, and began writing songs at the age of 10 on the piano.

In 1990, she worked with Jellybean Benitez of Jellybean Productions, Madonna's producer, and had her first song, Not This Time, released on Atlantic Records. She also wrote with Narada Michael Walden, Judd Friedman, Reggie Lucas. In 1996, one of her songs The lover that you are was #1 on the Billboard Hot Dance Club Play chart, covered by Pulse. It reached No. 22 in the UK Singles Chart in May 1996.

On stage Carla played the role of Maureen in Rent on Broadway and Los Angeles.

She also performed in movies including Unstoppable with Denzel Washington and Promised Land with Matt Damon.

Carla released her debut CD, All This Time in 2012.

== Filmography ==
- 2010: Unstoppable : Horse Trailer Owner
- 2011: Scream Show 2 : Janet Weaver
- 2012: Promised Land : Profesora

== Awards ==
- 1996 : ASCAP award for The lover that you are
