= A Constant Forge =

- Film Poster
- Directed by: Charles Kiselyak
- Narrated by: Lenny Citrano
- Distributed by: The Criterion Collection
- Release date: 2000
- Running time: 200 minutes
- Country: United States
- Language: English

A Constant Forge is a 2000 documentary film directed by Charles Kiselyak about the life and work of John Cassavetes.

It contains interviews with Cassavetes himself as well as recollections by actors who have worked with him and thoughts by admirers, including Lynn Carlin, Seymour Cassel, Peter Falk, John A. Gallagher, Ben Gazzara, Lelia Goldoni, Annette Insdorf, Carol Kane, Sean Penn, Gena Rowlands and Jon Voight.
