= Pulse (American band) =

Pulse is an American house music group.

== Releases ==
- "The Lover That You Are"
- "Won't Give Up My Music"
- "Yum Yum"
- "Shadows of the Past"
- "Music Takes You"

Of the five tracks they have charted on the Billboard Hot Dance Club Play chart, their best known would also be their only #1: "The Lover That You Are" in 1996 (credited to Pulse featuring Antoinette Roberson). It reached #22 in the UK Singles Chart in May 1996. It was their only UK chart hit. The flip side of the 12" featured an a cappella version of the song, the result of this is that many bootleg versions have surfaced, featuring the track being played over the instrumental of another dance track.

== See also ==
- List of number-one dance hits (United States)
- List of artists who reached number one on the US Dance chart
