= List of works by Fanny Crosby =

This is a selected list of works of Fanny Crosby.

== Biographies ==
- [Carleton, Will]. Fanny Crosby's Life-Story. New York, NY: Every Where Publishing Company, 1903.
- [Carleton, Will]. Fanny Crosby's Life-Work. New York, NY: Every Where Publishing Company, 1905.
- Memories of Eighty Years. Boston, MA: James H. Earle & Company, 1906.
- Keller, Cozette; Fanny Crosby, and William Howard Doane. Safe in the Arms of Jesus: Illustrated Pantomimed Hymn. Edgar S. Werner, 1917.
- This is My Story, This Is My Song, 1906. ISBN 978-1-898787-41-9.

== Books of poetry ==
- The Blind Girl. Wiley & Putnam, 1844.
- Monterey and Other Poems. R. Craighead, 1851.
- A Wreath of Columbia’s Flowers. H. Dayton, 1858.
- Bells at Evening and Other Verses; with Biographical Sketch by Robert Lowry. New York, NY: Biglow & Main, 1897; 3rd ed., New York, NY and Chicago, IL: Biglow & Main, 1899.

== Cantatas ==
- -------- and George Frederick Root. The Flower Queen: A Tonic Sol-fa Cantata. Advertiser and Chronicle Offices, 1880.
- -------- and George Frederick Root. Libretto of The Flower Queen; or the Coronation of the Rose. New York: Mason Brothers, 1853.
- -------- and Hart Pease Danks. Conquered by Kindness: A Juvenile Operetta. New York, NY: Wm. A. Pond, 1881.
- -------- and Hart Pease Danks. Zanie: An Operetta. Cincinnati: John Church Co., 1887.
- -------- and Theodore E. Perkins. "The Excursion". In The Mount Zion Collection of Sacred and Secular Music: Consisting of Tunes, Anthems, Singing School Exercises and Songs for the Sabbath School and Social Circle. Edited by Theodore E. Perkins. New York, NY: A.S. Barnes & Co., 1869.
- -------- and William Howard Doane. Santa Claus' Home; or, The Christmas Excursion: A Christmas Cantata for the Sunday School and Choir. Biglow & Main, 1886.
- -------- ; George Frederick Root; Chauncy M. Cady; and William Batchelder Bradbury. DANIEL: or the Captivity and Restoration. A Sacred Cantata in Three Parts, Words selected and prepared by C[hauncy]. M[arvin]. Cady, Esq., [1824-1889], assisted by Miss F[rances]. J[ane]. Crosby. [Mrs. Van Alstyne] [1820-1915]. Music composed by Geo[rge]. F[rederick]. Root [1820-1895] and W[illiam]. B[atchelder]. Bradbury [1816-1868],
- -------- ; George Frederick Root; and Henry Fisher. The New Flower Queen: or, The Coronation of the Rose. A Cantata in Two Parts, for the Use of Singing Classes in Academies, Ladies' Schools, and High Schools. Oliver Ditson co., 1870.

== Popular songs ==
- Fare Thee Well Kitty Dear—1852
- Mother, Sweet Mother Why Linger Away--(New York, NY: William Hall & Son, 1852)
- Bird of the North--(Feb. 1852)
- The Hazel Dell--(1853)
- There's Music in the Air-- (1857)

== Selected hymns ==
- "All the Way My Savior Leads Me"—1875, music by Robert Lowry
- "Blessed Assurance"—1873, music by Phoebe Knapp
- "The Bright Forever"—1871, music by Hubert P. Main
- "Close to Thee"—1874, music by Silas J. Vail
- "Eye Hath Not Seen"—1890, music by George C. Stebbins
- "He Hideth My Soul"—1890, music by William J. Kirkpatrick
- "More Like Jesus"
- "I Am Thine, O Lord (Draw Me Nearer)"—1875, music by W. Howard Doane
- "Jesus Is Tenderly Calling You Home (Jesus is Calling)"—1883, music by George C. Stebbins
- "My Savior First of All"—1891, music by John R. Sweney
- "Near the Cross"—1869, music by W. Howard Doane
- "Pass Me Not, O Gentle Saviour"—1868, music by W. Howard Doane
- "Praise Him! Praise Him! Jesus, Our Blessed Redeemer!"—1869, music by Chester G. Allen
- "Redeemed, How I Love to Proclaim It!"—1882, music by William J. Kirkpatrick
- "Rescue the Perishing, Care for the Dying"—1869, music by W. Howard Doane
- "Safe in the Arms of Jesus"—1868, music by W. Howard Doane
- "Saved by Grace"—1891, music by George C. Stebbins
- "Savior, More Than Life to Me"—1875, music by W. Howard Doane
- "Take the World, But Give Me Jesus"—1879, music by John R. Sweney
- "Tell Me the Story of Jesus"—1880, music by John R. Sweney
- "To God Be the Glory"—1875, music by W. Howard Doane
- "Unsearchable Riches"—1882, music by John R. Sweney
