= Near the Cross =

Hymn written by Fanny Crosby

- by Fanny Crosby
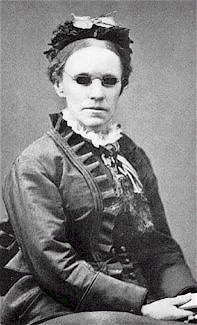
- Fanny Crosby
- Genre: Hymn
- Written: 1869
- Based on: Galatians 6:14
- Meter: 7.6.7.6 with refrain
- Melody: "Near the Cross" by William Howard Doane
- Near The Cross From the Life Destiny Television; Recorded May 2021

"Near the Cross", alternatively titled "Jesus, Keep Me Near the Cross" or "In the Cross", is a Christian hymn written by Fanny Crosby and published in 1869.

== Composition ==
The tune was composed by William Howard Doane before Crosby wrote the lyrics. The song is in F major and 6/8 time. It remains one of Crosby's best-known hymns and has been translated into several languages, including Arabic, German, Russian, Haitian Creole, and Spanish.

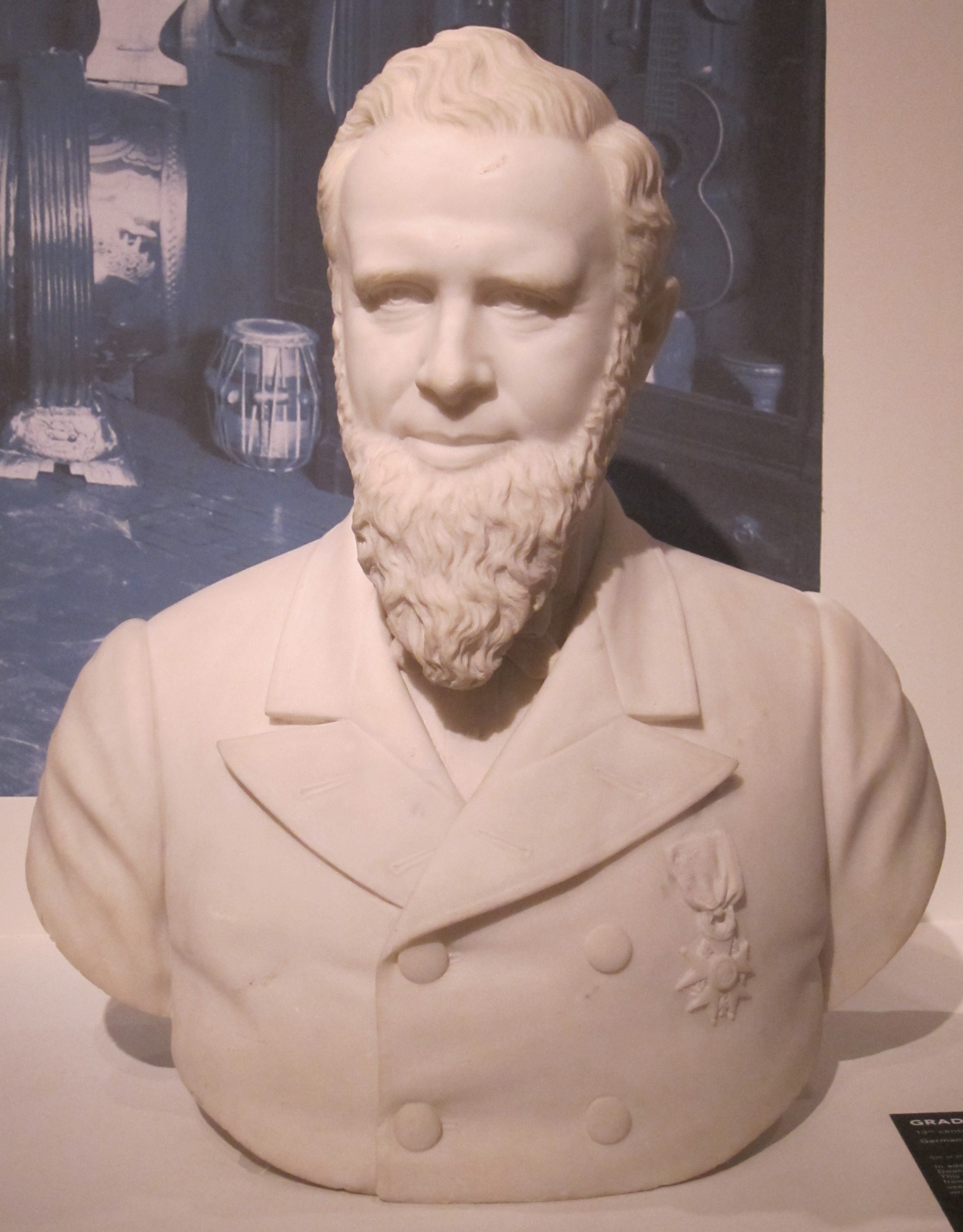
William Howard Doane

== Lyrics ==
Jesus, keep me near the cross;
There a precious fountain,
Free to all, a healing stream,
Flows from Calvary's mountain.

Refrain: In the cross, in the cross,
Be my glory ever,
Till my raptured soul shall find
Rest beyond the river.

Near the cross, a trembling soul,
Love and mercy found me,
There the Bright and Morning Star
Shed its beams around me.

Near the cross! O Lamb of God,
Brings its scenes before me;
Help me walk from day to day,
With its shadows o'er me.

Near the cross I'll watch and wait,
Hoping, trusting ever,
Till I reach the golden strand
Just beyond the river.

== See also ==
- List of works by Fanny Crosby
