= I am Thine, O Lord =

Hymn by Fanny Crosby

- Hymn
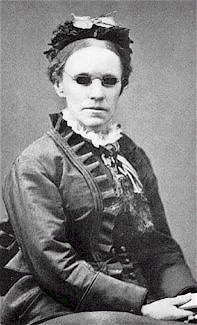
- Fanny Crosby
- Written: 1875
- Text: by Fanny Crosby
- Based on: Hebrews 10:22
- Meter: 10.7.10.7 with refrain
- Melody: "I Am Thine" by William Howard Doane

"I am Thine, O Lord" is one of many hymns written by Fanny Crosby, a prolific American hymn writer. The melody was composed by William Howard Doane. The former was talking with the latter one night about the proximity of God and penned the words before retiring for the night. It has also been reported that Fanny Crosby, though blind, had a sunset described to her in words before writing the lyrics. Hebrews 10:22 is reported as being a source of inspiration for the hymn:

"Let us draw near with a true heart in full assurance of faith, having our hearts sprinkled from an evil conscience, and our bodies washed with pure water." (King James Version)

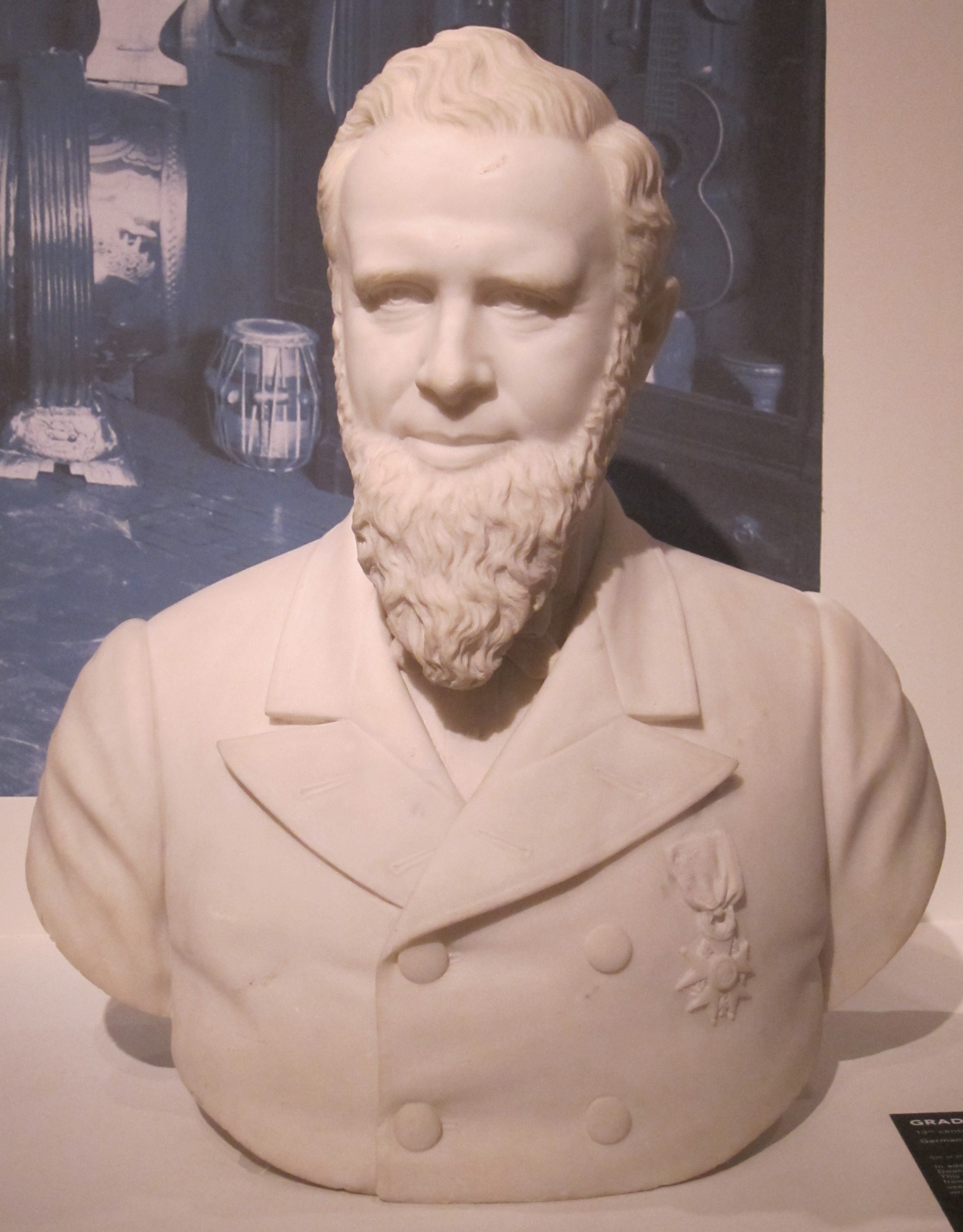
William Howard Doane

== Original lyrics ==
The original lyrics are as follows: -

I am Thine, O Lord, I have heard Thy voice,
And it told Thy love to me;
But I long to rise in the arms of faith
And be closer drawn to Thee.

Refrain:

Draw me nearer, nearer blessèd Lord,
To the cross where Thou hast died.
Draw me nearer, nearer, nearer blessèd Lord,
To Thy precious, bleeding side.

Consecrate me now to Thy service, Lord,
By the power of grace divine;
Let my soul look up with a steadfast hope,
And my will be lost in Thine.

Refrain

O the pure delight of a single hour
That before Thy throne I spend,
When I kneel in prayer, and with Thee, my God
I commune as friend with friend!

Refrain

There are depths of love that I cannot know
Till I cross the narrow sea;
There are heights of joy that I may not reach
Till I rest in peace with Thee. Amen

Refrain

== Other versions ==
Translations of the hymn exist in various languages: -

- "Je suis Tien, Seigneur" (French)
- "Ich bin Dein, O Herr" (German)
- "Tuyo Soy, Jesús" (Spanish)
- "Jag är din, O Gud" (Swedish)
- "吸引我近更近" (Chinese)
