= Hanson Place Seventh-day Adventist Church =

Church in Brooklyn, New York

- U.S. National Register of Historic Places
- New York City Landmark
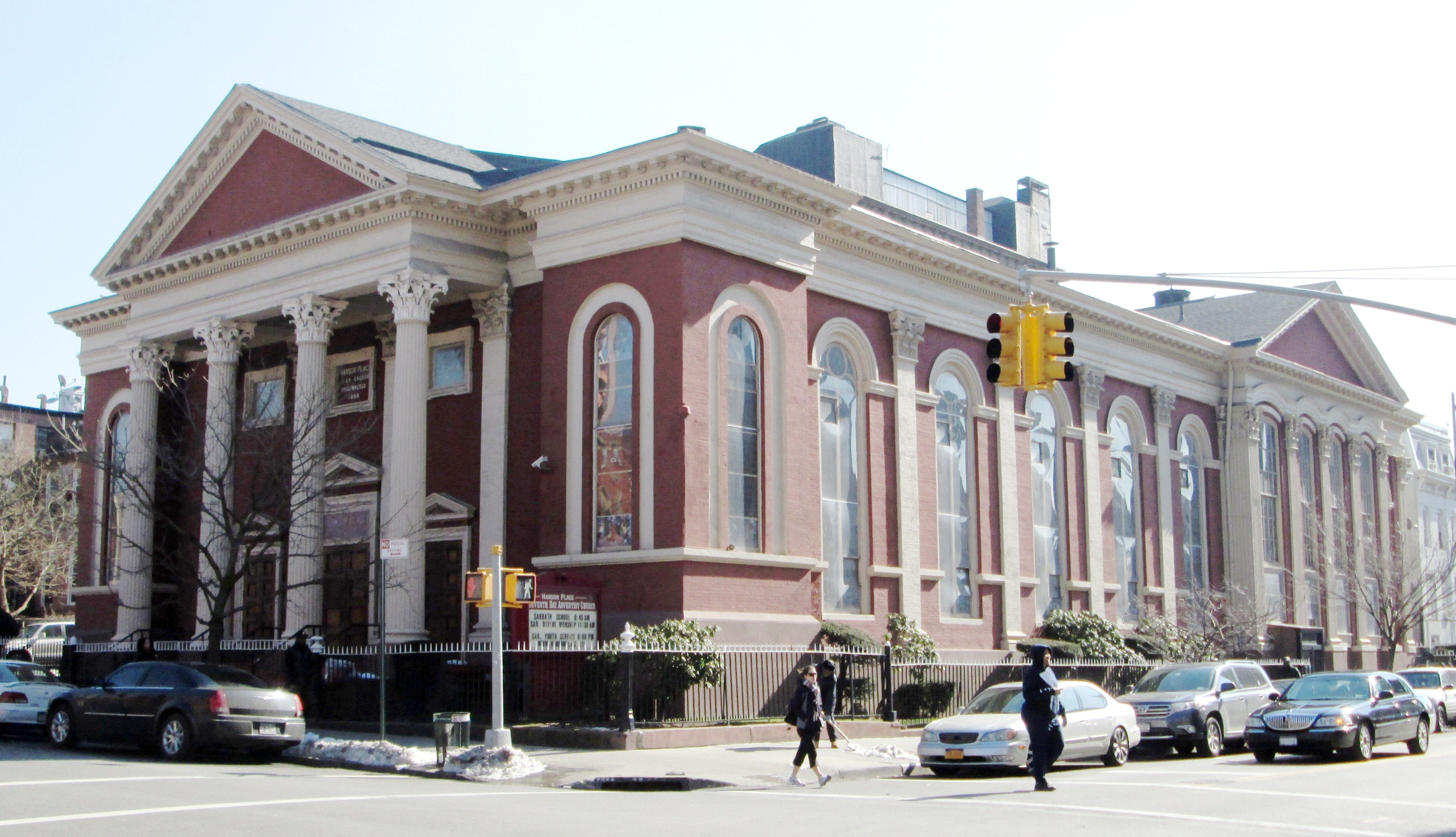
- The church in 2013

- Location within New York City Location within New York Location within the United States
- Location: 88 Hanson Pl., Brooklyn, New York
- Coordinates: 40°41′7″N 73°58′26″W
- Built: 1857-60
- Architect: George Penchard
- Architectural style: Early Romanesque, Classical revival
- NRHP reference No.: 80002631

Significant dates
- Added to NRHP: April 23, 1980
- Designated NYCL: October 13, 1970

Hanson Place Seventh-day Adventist Church, is an historic church at 88 Hanson Place between South Oxford Street and South Portland Avenue in the Fort Greene neighborhood of Brooklyn, New York City, which was built in 1857-60 as the Hanson Place Baptist Church. It was designed by George Penchard in the Early Romanesque Revival style. The building, which is constructed of brick on a brick foundation covered in stucco, features an entrance portico topped by a steeply pitched pediment supported by four Corinthian columns, while the side facade on South Portland features pilasters. The building's interior and exterior were restored in the 1970s. It has been a Seventh-day Adventist church since 1963.

The church was designated a New York City landmark in 1970, and was listed on the National Register of Historic Places in 1980.

The noted 1864 Baptist hymn, "Hanson Place," by Robert Lowry, was named after this church.

== See also ==
- List of New York City Landmarks
- National Register of Historic Places listings in Kings County, New York
