= Silas Jones Vail =

Silas Jones Vail (1818–1883) was an American hatter and composer, notable for hymns such as "Scatter Seeds of Kindness", "The Guiding Hand", "Nothing But Leaves", "O, Be Saved" and "The Gate Ajar for Me."

Silas Jones Vail was born on October 16, 1818, at Southold, New York.

He was a hatter by trade, but a musician and composer by passion, notable for writing hymns, some of which were set to music by Mrs. Albert Smith. Phillip Phillips published his first book of hymns. He was also associated with famous hymnists such as Fanny J. Crosby, Stephen Foster and William Sherwin.

Publications include The Athenaeum Collection (1863) and Songs of Grace and Glory (1874).

Vail died in Brooklyn, New York on May 20, 1883.
