= Robert Lowry (hymn writer) =

American songwriter

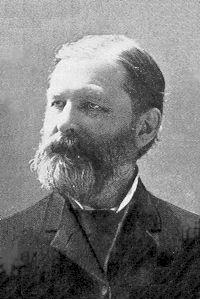
- Born: March 12, 1826; Philadelphia, Pennsylvania, U.S.
- Died: November 25, 1899 (aged 73); Plainfield, New Jersey, U.S.
- Occupations: Baptist minister, hymn writer
- Spouse(s): Anna Rhees Loxley (m. 1854; died 1890) Mary Jane Runyon (m. 1892)

Robert Lowry (March 12, 1826 – November 25, 1899) was an American preacher who became a popular writer of gospel music in the mid-to-late 19th century. His best-known hymns include "Shall We Gather at the River", "Christ Arose!", "How Can I Keep from Singing?" and "Nothing But The Blood Of Jesus".

Born in Philadelphia, Lowry studied at the University at Lewisburg and entered the Baptist ministry in 1854. During the following 45 years he held a number of pastorates in New York, Pennsylvania and New Jersey. Between 1869 and 1875 he combined his pastoral work with a professorship in rhetoric at his alma mater, and later served as the university's chancellor. From 1868 he acted as hymnals editor to Biglow and Main, the country's leading publisher of gospel and Sunday School music; under his supervision more than 20 hymnals were produced by the firm, many of wide and enduring popularity.

Despite his protestations that preaching was his main vocation and that music was merely a sideline, it is as a hymnwriter that Lowry is chiefly remembered, ranking with such as W. H. Doane and Ira D. Sankey as one of the originators of a musical tradition that has lasted until the modern era of revival.

== Life ==
=== Early life ===
Robert Lowry was born in Philadelphia, Pennsylvania, on March 12, 1826. He was the son of Crozier Lowry, who had emigrated from Ulster, in the north of Ireland in the early part of the 19th century. In 1843, when he was 17, Robert underwent an experience of religious conversion. As a result he left the Associate Presbyterian Church of North America, his parents' church, and joined the First Baptist Church of Philadelphia, where he worked enthusiastically as a Sunday School teacher and chorister.

In 1848 Lowry was encouraged by his pastor, The Rev. Geo. B. Ide, D.D., to prepare for a life's work in the Christian ministry. With this end in view, Lowry began studies at the University at Lewisburg (now Bucknell University). The university was then newly chartered, and its lack of premises meant that classes were held in the basement of the Baptist church. By this time Lowry was building a reputation both as a preacher and hymn-writer, and he displayed his talents by organizing the college choir and teaching music to his fellow-students. In 1854 he graduated with the highest honors, and in the same year was ordained into the Baptist ministry. Also in that year he married Anna Rhees Loxley.

=== Ministry ===
Lowry began his ministry in 1854, at the First Baptist church in West Chester, Pennsylvania. He remained there until 1858, when he moved to the pastorate of the Bloomingdale Baptist church, in New York. After two years there he moved to Brooklyn, where he transferred his ministry to the Hanson Place Baptist church in 1861.

"I was in London, and had gone to meeting in the Old Bailey ... I was preparing to leave, when the chairman of the meeting announced that the author of 'Shall We Gather at the River?' was present, and I was requested by name to come forward. Men applauded and women waved their handkerchiefs as I went to the platform. It was a tribute to the hymn; but I felt, when it was over, that, after all, I had perhaps done some little good in the world, and I felt more than ever content to die when God called."

— Robert Lowry, quoted in "Robert Lowry: Baptist Preacher and Hymn Writer" by J.H.Hall

Although he considered preaching as his principal vocation, Lowry continued to write hymns and compose music. In 1864, while at Hanson Place, he wrote and composed what became perhaps his best-known hymn, "Shall We Gather at the River". He wrote this during a heatwave which accompanied an epidemic in the city which claimed many lives. (Note: Although McNeill recounts this in his Encyclopedia of American Gospel Music, historical records do not show either an unusual heatwave or new epidemic in New York in 1864. The city did suffer many disease outbreaks between 1845 and 1865 due to overcrowding and lack of public sanitation, but 1864 was not one of the worst years. (See Columbia University, "Density, Equity, and the History of Epidemics in New York City," 30 June 2020.)) Almost overcome by the heat, he suddenly envisaged the passage in the Book of Revelation, chapter 22: "And he showed me a river of water of life, bright as crystal, proceeding out of the throne of God and of the Lamb". Despite its popularity, Lowry did not regard the hymn highly: "It is brass band music, has a march movement, and for that reason has become popular, though for myself I do not think much of it." Also while at Hanson Place, in 1867, Lowry composed the tune to Isaac Watts's hymn "Marching to Zion". He had produced his first hymn anthology, Happy Voices (in which "Shall We Gather" first appeared) in 1865, and followed this in 1868 with Gospel Melodies.

In 1868, the New York music publishers Biglow & Main, who had taken over the hymn publishing activities of William Batchelder Bradbury, who had died, approached Lowry with the proposal that he step into Bradbury's role as hymnals editor. Initially Lowry was opposed to the idea, afraid that it might affect his pastoral and preaching work, but was persuaded. During the following 30 years, often in conjunction with hymnwriters such as W. H. Doane and Ira D. Sankey, Lowry oversaw the production of more than 20 hymnals.

After eight years at Hanson Place, in 1869 Lowry was persuaded by Dr. Loomis, president of the University at Lewisburg, to return to the town in the dual capacity of Professor of Rhetoric at the university and pastor of the new Lewisburg Baptist church. (Note: Sources record this appointment respectively as Professor Of Literature, Professor of Belles-Lettres and Professor of Rhetoric.) He lived at the southern end of University Avenue, the building now known as Robert Lowry House. The church was dedicated in June 1870; Lowry's skillful oratory was instrumental in persuading the congregation, by no means a prosperous group, to subscribe $10,000 towards meeting the church's construction debt. Amid his various duties, Lowry continued to write hymns and compose tunes to existing words. In 1872 he wrote the tune to Annie S. Hawks's hymn "I Need Thee Every Hour", and in 1874 wrote the words and music for "Christ Arose!" ("Low In The Grave He Lay").

In 1875 Lowry was awarded the honorary degree of Doctor of Divinity (D.D.) by Lewisburg. In that year he decided to relinquish his professorship, and take up the pastorate at the Park Avenue Church in Plainfield, New Jersey. On leaving Lewisburg, Lowry accepted the honorary position of chancellor of the university. Also in 1875 he provided the music to Fanny Crosby's hymn "All the Way My Savior Leads Me", one of many co-operations with the prolific Crosby. In 1876 he wrote and composed another of his best-known works: "Nothing But the Blood of Jesus".

=== Later years and death ===
In 1880 Lowry took a break from his pastoral duties at Plainfield and visited Europe. His health at this time was deteriorating, and he suffered from increasing deafness. In 1885, feeling the need for a longer rest, he resigned his ministry. After travels in the south and west of the country, and in Mexico, he returned to Plainfield much refreshed, and resumed his pastoral work.

Lowry was a member of the Phi Kappa Psi fraternity, and in 1888 was invested as its national president for a two-year term, in succession to Governor Joseph B. Foraker. In 1890 his wife Anna died; two years later Lowry married Mary Jane Runyon. In 1894 he provided a memorial hymn to celebrate the 50th anniversary of the Lewisburg Baptist church. Lowry continued to live and work in Plainfield until his death, on November 25, 1899. He was buried at Hillside Cemetery in Plainfield. The eulogist summarized Lowry's life and work thus: "His melodies and songs were but the expression of the man’s heart and his character, and they attracted all to him".

== Hymn writer ==
Lowry is credited with the writing of more than 500 hymn tunes, often supplying the text as well as the music – one of the earliest hymnwriters to do so. His first hymn, "When the Morning Light", was written in 1847 when he was 21 years old. His love of music dated from his childhood, when he would play any musical instrument that came to hand, and his melodies were strongly influenced by the popular music of the time. Thus, Lowry characterized "Shall We Gather" as brass band music, but he would adopt a more conventional hymn tone for reflective pieces such as "I Need Thee Every Hour" and "Savior, Thy Dying Love". In a number of cases when setting the words of others he would add a chorus or refrain. He had an ear for dramatic effect, exemplified in the contrast, in "Low In The Grave He Lay", between the solemn verses and the exultant chorus proclaiming the Resurrection.

In later life, while remaining self-taught, Lowry adopted a more formal approach towards his music. According to his biographer Henry S Burrage: "When he saw that the obligations of musical editorship were laid upon him, he began the study of music in earnest, and sought the best musical text-books and works on the highest forms of musical composition".

When asked to explain his methods of composition, in particular whether in his own hymns words or music came first, Lowry replied:

"I have no method. Sometimes the music comes and the words follow, fitted insensibly to the melody. I watch my moods, and when anything good strikes me, whether words or music, and no matter where I am, at home or on the street, I jot it down. Often the margin of a newspaper or the back of an envelope serves as a notebook. My brain is a sort of spinning machine, I think, for there is music running through it all the time. I do not pick out my music on the keys of an instrument. The tunes of nearly all the hymns I have written have been completed on paper before I tried them on the organ. Frequently the words of the hymn and the music have been written at the same time."

A list of the published hymn collections for which Lowry was solely or jointly responsible is as follows. Many of these collections were very popular; Pure Gold, published in 1871, sold more than a million copies.

- 1865 Happy Voices
- 1868 Gospel Melodies
- 1868 Chapel Melodies (with Silas Vail) Biglow & Main
- 1869 Bright Jewels Biglow & Main
- 1871 Pure Gold (with W. H. Doane) Biglow & Main
- 1871, 1872, 1873 Hymn Service
- 1873 Royal Diadem (with W. H. Doane) Biglow & Main
- 1873 Temple Anthems
- 1874 Tidal Wave
- 1875 Brightest and Best (with W. H. Doane) Biglow & Main
- 1877 Gospel Music Biglow & Main
- 1877 Welcome Tidings (with W. H. Doane and Ira D. Sankey) Biglow & Main
- 1878 Chautauqua Carols
- 1879 Gospel Hymn and Tune Book (with W. H. Doane)
- 1879 Hymn Service for the Sunday School (with W. H. Doane and others) Biglow & Main
- 1880 Good as Gold (with W. H. Doane) Biglow & Main
- 1880 Hymn Service No.2 (with W. H. Doane and John Vincent) Biglow & Main
- 1881–1886 Cantatas for Christmas
- 1882 Our Glad Hosanna (with W. H. Doane) Biglow & Main
- 1882–1887 Cantatas for Easter
- 1884 Joyful Lays (with W. H. Doane) Biglow & Main
- 1886 The Glad Refrain (with W. H. Doane) Biglow & Main
- 1889 Select Gems (with W. H. Doane) American Baptist Publication Society
- 1889 The Bright Array (with W. H. Doane)
- 1898 Royal Hymnal (with Ira D. Sankey) Biglow & Main

== Assessment and legacy ==
"We owe a debt of gratitude to him and so many others of his day who have enriched our garden of psalms, hymns, and spiritual songs, and enabled us to teach and admonish one another even as we express our praise and devotion to our Lord musically."

— La Vista Church of Christ, 2016

Lowry had a gift for oratory which one later commentator (William McNeill) described as "spellbinding". Lowry himself said "I would rather preach a gospel sermon to an appreciative, receptive congregation than write a hymn", he saw preaching as his main vocation and was diffident about his success as a hymn-writer, which he saw as a side issue. But it is principally as a hymn-writer that he is remembered. His hymns, says Hall, have "gone on and on ... What he had thought in his inmost soul has become a part of the emotions of the whole Christian world. We are all his debtors."

The collections that Lowry supervised represented an important contribution to the 19th century Sunday School movement, and have continued their influence in the gospel music of the modern revival era. The Methodist hymnologist Carl F. Price describes the music of Lowry, Doane and Sankey as illustrating "the curve of the modern American prayer meeting tunes, as it proceeds from the more dignified rhythm of church music to the catchy, lively jingle of the popular ballad." A hymn, Lowry said should be easily understood, reflecting the writer's own experiences with strong inspiring words.

Within his lifetime Lowry was honored with high office in Bucknell University and the Phi Kappa Psi fraternity, and was one of the original inductees to Bucknell's Academy of Artistic Achievement Awards. In 1911, twelve years after Lowry's death, a memorial stone was unveiled at the Park Avenue Baptist Church, Plainfield.

== Notes and references ==
=== Sources ===
- Brown, Theron; Butterworth, Hezekiah (2006). "Field Hymns". The Story of The Hymns and Tunes. Project Gutenberg ebook, originally published by Ithaca, New York 1906. ISBN 9783901170096. OCLC 746968523.
- Cross, Virginia A. (2008). "The Music of the American Sunday School before 1875". In Powell, Paul R. (ed.). Hymnology in the Service of the Church: Essays in Honor of Harry Eskew. Fenton, Mo.: MorningStar Music Publishers. pp. unpaginated. ISBN 978-0-944529-76-8.
- Hustad, Donald P. (2008). "The Hymnological Sleuth". In Powell, Paul R. (ed.). Hymnology in the Service of the Church: Essays in Honor of Harry Eskew. Fenton, Mo.: MorningStar Music Publishers. pp. unpaginated. ISBN 978-0-944529-76-8.
- Julian, John (1957). A Dictionary of Hymnology, Setting Forth the Origin and History of Christian Hymns of all Ages and Nations. New York: Dover Publications Inc. pp. digitized, unpaginated. ISBN 9783901170096. OCLC 430180275.
- Keehn, Roy D., ed. (2016). Grand Catalogue of the Phi Kappa Psi Fraternity, February 1, 1910 (reprint ed.). Wentworth Press. p. 368. ISBN 978-1-36270-275-7.
- Kurian, George Thomas; Lamport, Mark A., eds. (2016). Encyclopedia of Christianity in the United States, Volume 5. Lanham, MD: Rowman & Littlefield. pp. 1373–1374. ISBN 978-1-44224-431-3.
- McNeill, William K., ed. (2010). Encyclopedia of American Gospel Music. New York and London: Routledge. pp. 237–238. ISBN 978-0-415-87569-1.
- Price, Carl F. (1919). The Music and Hymnody of the Methodist Hymnal (PDF). New York and Cincinnati: The Methodist Book Concern. p. 191. ISBN 9783901170096. OCLC 4342749.
- Sankey, Ira D. (compiler) (1999). Sacred Songs and Solos. London: Marshall Pickering. ISBN 0-551-05093-4.
