= Shall We Gather at the River? =

American Christian hymn by Robert Lowry

- by Robert Lowry
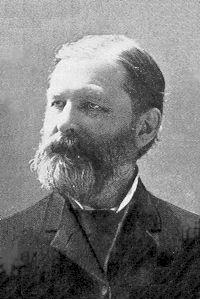
- Robert Lowry
- Genre: Hymn
- Written: 1864
- Based on: Revelation 22:1
- Meter: 8.7.8.7 with refrain
- Melody: "Hanson Place"
- Published: 1865
- Publisher: American Tract Society

"Shall We Gather at the River?" or simply "At the River" are the popular names for the traditional Christian hymn originally titled "Beautiful River" and subsequently titled "Hanson Place," written by American poet and gospel music composer Robert Lowry (1826–1899). It was written in 1864 and is now in the public domain. The title "Hanson Place" is a reference to the original Hanson Place Baptist Church in Brooklyn, where Lowry, as a Baptist minister, sometimes served. The original building now houses a different denomination.

The music is in the key of D and uses an 8.7.8.7 R meter. An arrangement was also composed by Charles Ives and titles "At The River." A later arrangement is included in Aaron Copland's Old American Songs (1952) in addition to being used by German composer Anton Plate in 'At The River' (2003), and by American wind band composer David Maslanka in his Symphony No. 9 (2011). The song was sung live at the 1980 funeral of American Supreme Court Justice William O. Douglas. The Charles Ives version of the hymn was arranged, fully orchestrated for jazz orchestra and recorded the 2014 album Mists: Charles Ives for Jazz Orchestra.

There have been many recordings of the hymn including those by Patti Page, Burl Ives and Willie Nelson.

== Lyrics ==
The song's lyrics refer to the Christian concept of the anticipation of restoration and reward, and reference the motifs found at Revelation 22:1–2 - a crystal clear river with water of life, issuing from the throne of heaven, all presented by an angel of God. It also brings to mind Acts 16:13, where Paul found women gathered by the river outside the city gates of Phillipi.

Chorus :

Yes, we’ll gather at the river,
The beautiful, the beautiful river;
Gather with the saints at the river
That flows by the throne of God.

== In popular culture ==
=== In film Westerns ===
The song is often used in Western films, on soundtracks and sung by characters. It was one of director John Ford's favorite hymns, and he featured it in many of his most famous films. The melody is used satirically in Stagecoach (1939), underscoring the early scene in which Claire Trevor's character, Dallas, is run out of town “by the ladies of the Law and Order League.” It also appears in Ford's Tobacco Road (1941), My Darling Clementine (1946), Three Godfathers (1948), Wagon Master (1950), twice in The Searchers (1956), and 7 Women (1966).

The song is also heard in Gene Fowler, Jr.'s The Oregon Trail (1959) and in Elliot Silverstein's Cat Ballou (1965). It was used in the Sam Peckinpah films Major Dundee (1965) and also The Wild Bunch (1969) where it was employed as ironic counterpoint during an onscreen massacre. It was similarly put to use in such dark, late-period Westerns as 1968's Hang 'Em High and 1972's Jeremiah Johnson.

The song was used in Gore Verbinski's infamous 2013 pastiche western, The Lone Ranger.

=== In other films ===
It features prominently in David Lean's romantic comedy Hobson's Choice (1954) and in Richard Brooks's drama Elmer Gantry (1960). A caricatural vocal rendition of the song (with new revival-style lyrics) is used for both a car chase and the end credits of Howard Morris' caper comedy, Who's Minding the Mint? (1967). It is also included in the film adaptation of The Handmaid's Tale (film).

Part of the hymn was sung in the Academy Award-winning period film, Trip to Bountiful (1985). The hymn is a primary musical theme for schlock film Tromeo and Juliet (1996), credited on the soundtrack as Yes, We'll Gather at the River. The title "Shall We Gather at the River" is used as the name of a second season episode of Falling Skies. The hymn opens Richard Rossi's 1920s period piece drama Aimee Semple McPherson. The Yoruba redition of the hymn was the outro in My Father's Shadow.

== International use ==
In Sweden, the 1876 hymn to the same melody O, hur saligt att få vandra ("O, how blessed it is to walk") became one of the most popular songs of the widespread Swedish revivalist movement. A drinking song to the same melody, Jag har aldrig vart på snusen ("I've never been on snus"), partly mocking the religious message of the Swedish original, is one of the most popular drinking songs at Swedish universities.

In Germany, the melody of the hymn became a well-known christmas carol named Welchen Jubel, welche Freude ("What rejoice, o what a joy") with the lyrics of Ernst Gebhardt (1832–1899).

In 1937, the tune was adopted in Japan to a popular enka song Tabakoya no Musume (タバコやの娘, "The Girl at the Tobacconist"). This enka song was soon parodied into juvenile song about the testicles of the tanuki (たんたんたぬき), which goes, "Tan-tan-tanuki's testicles: there isn't any wind, but [they still go] swing swing swing". The parodied version of the song remain popular among Japanese children and adults to this day. "Tabakoya no Musume" later formed the basis of the Bic Camera jingle.

The University of Antioquia in Medellin, Colombia uses the same melody in its official song.

The British band Groove Armada's single "At the River" features a trombone part derived from "Shall We Gather at the River?", played by band member Andy Cato.
