= To God Be the Glory =

Christian hymn by Fanny Crosby

- by Fanny Crosby
- Genre: Hymn
- Written: 1875
- Based on: Galatians 1:4-5
- Meter: 11.11.11.11 with refrain
- Melody: "To God Be the Glory" by William Howard Doane
- "To Be God Be The Glory From Hymns Without Words; Recorded 2008

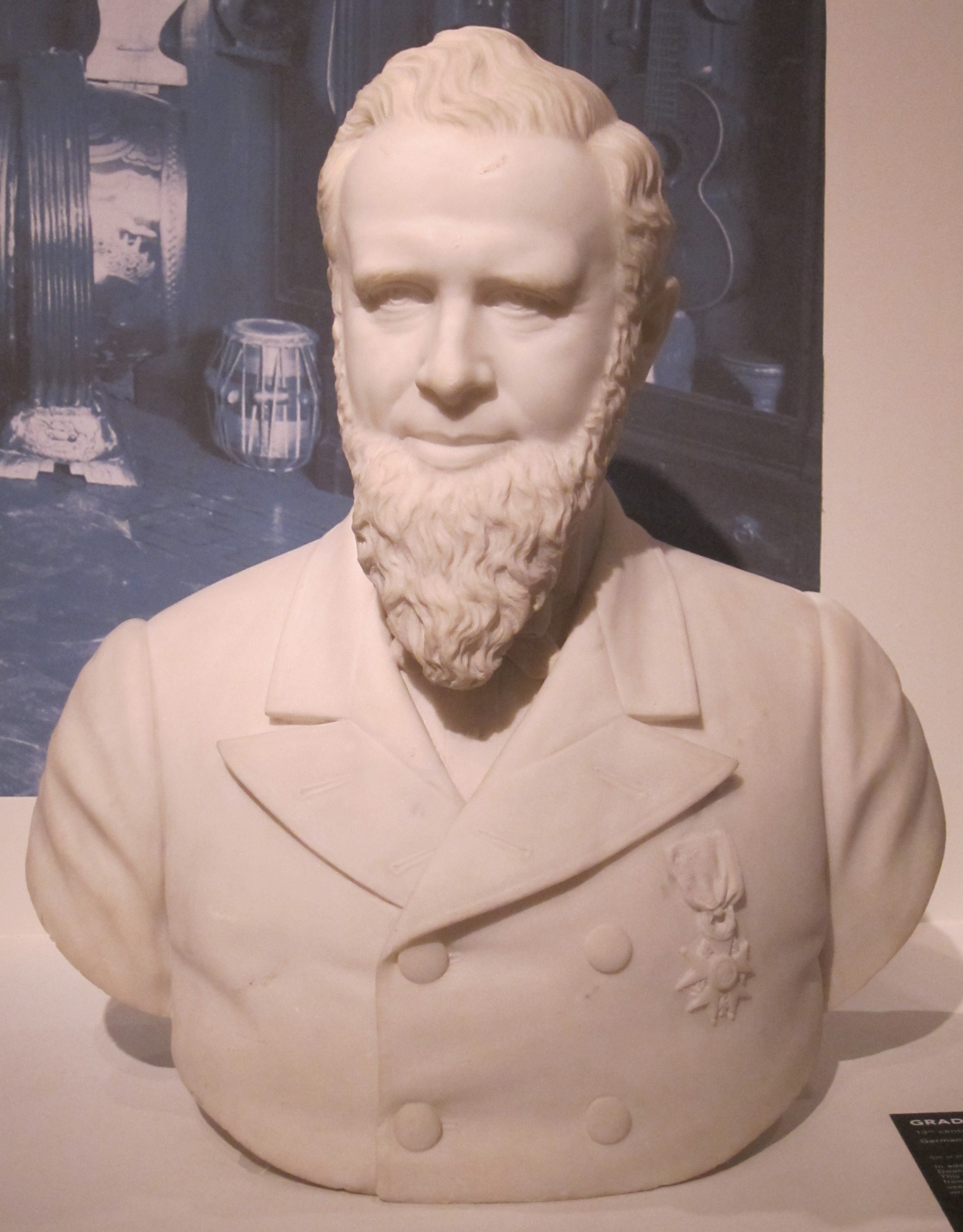
William Howard Doane

To God Be the Glory is a hymn with lyrics by Fanny Crosby and tune by William Howard Doane, first published in 1875.

It appears to have been written around 1872 but was first published in 1875 in Lowry and Doane's song collection, Brightest and Best. It was already popular in Great Britain before publication. Ira Sankey had introduced it there during Moody's 1873-74 evangelistic campaigns.

The song failed to achieve wide usage in the United States and was included in very few hymnals. In 1954 Cliff Barrows, song leader for Billy Graham, was handed a copy with the suggestion that it be added to the song book for the London Crusade. It was so popular that he included it again later that year in the Crusade in Nashville, Tennessee. The audience responded enthusiastically and from that time on, he used it regularly. With this exposure, the song rapidly became familiar to Christians worldwide and is included in most modern hymnals.

== Lyrics ==
Stanza 1
To God be the glory, great things He hath done;
So loved He the world that He gave us His Son,
Who yielded His life an atonement for sin,
And opened the life gate that all may go in.

Refrain
Praise the Lord, praise the Lord,
Let the earth hear His voice!
Praise the Lord, praise the Lord,
Let the people rejoice!
O come to the Father, through Jesus the Son,
And give Him the glory, great things He hath done.

Stanza 2
O perfect redemption, the purchase of blood,
To every believer the promise of God;
The vilest offender who truly believes,
That moment from Jesus a pardon receives.

(Refrain)

Stanza 3
Great things He hath taught us, great things He hath done,
And great our rejoicing through Jesus the Son;
But purer, and higher, and greater will be
Our wonder, our rapture, when Jesus we see.

(Refrain)

== Translations ==
- French: À Dieu soit la gloire
