= All the Way My Savior Leads Me =

1875 Christian hymn

- Hymn
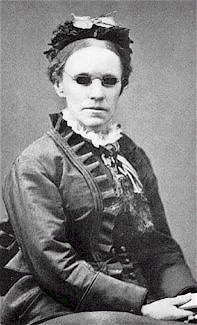
- Fanny Crosby
- Written: 1875
- Text: by Fanny Crosby
- Based on: Deuteronomy 32:12
- Meter: 8.7.8.7 D
- Melody: Robert Lowry

"All the Way My Savior Leads Me" is a Christian hymn with lyrics written in 1875 by Fanny J. Crosby (1820-1915) to a tune written by the Baptist minister Dr. Robert Lowry.

== History ==
In her autobiography, Crosby wrote that this was her first hymn to be set to music by Lowry. The hymn was first published in Brightest and best : a choice collection of new songs, duets, choruses, invocation and benediction hymns for the Sunday school and meetings of prayer and praise (edited by Dr. Lowry and W. Howard Doane) in 1875 by the New York publisher Biglow & Main. The syllabic meter is 8.7.8.7.D.

A frequently told story about this hymn relates that it came to Fanny as a result of a prayer. Struggling financially, she desperately needed some money. As her usual custom, Fanny began to pray. A few minutes later, a gentleman offered her five dollars, the exact amount she needed. Later recalling the incident, she said, "I have no way of accounting for this except to believe that God put it into the heart of this good man to bring the money." The poem she wrote afterward became "All The Way My Savior Leads Me".

== Popularity ==
The song is considered one of Crosby's best known hymns. It has been included in over 250 hymnals, including a quarter of those produced since 1970.

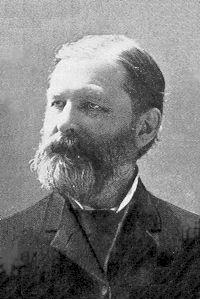
Robert Lowry
