= C. Bernard Ruffin =

American non-fiction author (born 1947)

C. Bernard Ruffin (November 22, 1947 – May 4, 2019) was an American non-fiction author, as well as an educator, theologian, and a pastor.

Ruffin was a third-generation Washingtonian, born in 1947, and was a graduate of Roosevelt High School. He earned his A.B. in History in 1969 from Bowdoin College in Brunswick, Maine. He graduated Phi Beta Kappa from Yale Divinity School in New Haven, Connecticut, in 1972.

Ruffin served as intern pastor in Loganton, Pennsylvania, from 1972 to 1973. He was a parish assistant at Luther Place Memorial Church from 1973 to 1974 and Pastor of Gloria Dei Lutheran Church in Alexandria, Virginia, from 1974 until 1976. He became a member of Holy Comforter Church in Washington, DC, in 1977.

Ruffin worked as a teacher at South Lakes High School in Reston, Virginia, where he taught history between 1982 and 2007 and wrote multiple books on various religious and historical topics. Ruffin lived in Reston until his death in 2019.

Before he died, he served as pastor at Holy Comforter Lutheran Church in Washington, D.C.

== Partial list of books ==
- Fanny Crosby. United Church Press, 1976; Barbour Publishing, 1985.
- The Shroud of Turin: The Most Up-To-Date Analysis of All the Facts Regarding the Church's Controversial Relic
- The Twelve: The Lives of the Apostles After Calvary
- Profiles of Faith: The Religious Beliefs of Eminent Americans
- Last Words: A Dictionary of Deathbed Quotations
- The Life of Brother Andre: The Miracle Worker of St. Joseph
- The Days of the Martyrs: A History of the Persecution of Christians from Apostolic Times to the Time of Constantine
- Padre Pio:The True Story
