= Fanny Crosby =

American mission worker, poet, lyricist, and composer (1820–1915)

Fanny Jane Crosby
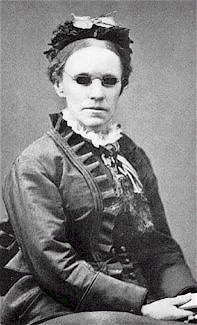
- Crosby in 1872
- Born: Frances Jane Crosby; March 24, 1820; Brewster, New York, U.S.
- Died: February 12, 1915 (aged 94); Bridgeport, Connecticut, U.S.
- Occupations: Lyricist, poet, composer
- Years active: 1844–1915
- Spouse(s): Alexander van Alstyne, Jr. (m. 1858; died 1902)
- Children: 1

Frances Jane van Alstyne (née Crosby; March 24, 1820 – February 12, 1915), more commonly known as Fanny J. Crosby, was an American mission worker, poet, lyricist, and composer. A prolific hymnist, she wrote more than 8,000 hymns and gospel songs, (Note: One source indicates at least 8,440. See Haeussler, Armin (1954). The Story of Our Hymns: The Handbook to the Hymnal of the Evangelical and Reformed Church (3rd ed.). General Synod of the Evangelical and Reformed Church by Eden Pub. House. p. 613. and Osbeck (1999), p. 12) with more than 100 million copies printed. She is also known for her teaching and rescue mission work. By the end of the 19th century, she had become a household name.

Crosby was known as the "Queen of Gospel Song Writers" and the "Mother of modern congregational singing in America", with most American hymnals containing her work. Her gospel songs were "paradigmatic of all revival music", and Ira Sankey attributed the success of the Moody and Sankey evangelical campaigns largely to Crosby's hymns. Some of Crosby's best-known works include "Pass Me Not, O Gentle Saviour", "Blessed Assurance", "Jesus Is Tenderly Calling You Home", "Praise Him, Praise Him", "Rescue the Perishing", and "To God Be the Glory". Some publishers were hesitant to have so many hymns by one person in their hymnals, so Crosby used nearly 200 different pseudonyms during her career. (Note: For a list of 98 of her pseudonyms, see "Frances Jane Crosby (Fanny Crosby) 1820–1915". One source indicates that she used approximately 250 pseudonyms; see Neptune (2002), p. 91)

Crosby also wrote more than 1,000 secular poems and had four books of poetry published, as well as two best-selling autobiographies. Additionally, she co-wrote popular secular songs, political and patriotic songs, and at least five cantatas on biblical and patriotic themes, including The Flower Queen, the first secular cantata by an American composer. She was committed to Christian rescue missions and was known for her public speaking.

== Early life and education ==
Birthplace of Fanny Crosby

Frances Jane Crosby was born on March 24, 1820, in the village of Brewster, about 50 miles (80 km) north of New York City. She was the only child of John Crosby and his second wife Mercy Crosby, both of whom were relatives of Revolutionary War spy Enoch Crosby. He was a widower who had a daughter from his first marriage. According to C. Bernard Ruffin, John and Mercy were possibly first cousins; however, "by the time Fanny Crosby came to write her memoirs [in 1906], the fact that her mother and father were related ... had become a source of embarrassment, and she maintained that she did not know anything about his lineage".

(l to r) Mercy, Julia, and Caroline Morris and Fanny Crosby

Crosby was proud of her Puritan heritage. She traced her ancestry from Anna Brigham and Simon Crosby who arrived in Boston in 1635 (and were among the founders of Harvard College); their descendants married into Mayflower families, making Crosby a descendant of Elder William Brewster, Edward Winslow, and Thomas Prence, and a member of the exclusive Daughters of the Mayflower.

She was also a member of the Daughters of the American Revolution in Bridgeport, Connecticut, writing the verses of the state song of the Connecticut branch. Through Simon Crosby, Fanny was also a relative of Presbyterian minister Howard Crosby and his neoabolitionist son Ernest Howard Crosby, as well as singers Bing and Bob Crosby.

At six weeks old, Crosby caught a cold and developed inflammation of the eyes. Mustard poultices were applied to treat the discharges. According to Crosby, this procedure damaged her optic nerves and blinded her, but modern physicians think that her blindness was more likely congenital and, given her age, may simply not have been noticed by her parents.

Her father died in November 1820 when Fanny was only six months old, so she was raised by her mother and maternal grandmother Eunice Paddock Crosby (born about 1778; died about 1831). These women grounded her in Christian principles, helping her memorize long passages from the Bible, and she became an active member of the John Street Methodist Episcopal Church in Manhattan.

Peach Pond Meeting House, North Salem, New York

When Crosby was three, the family moved to North Salem, New York, where Eunice had been raised. In April 1825, she was examined by the surgeon Valentine Mott, who concluded that her condition was inoperable and that her blindness was permanent.

At age eight, Crosby wrote her first poem which described her condition. She later stated: "It seemed intended by the blessed providence of God that I should be blind all my life, and I thank him for the dispensation. If perfect earthly sight were offered me tomorrow I would not accept it. I might not have sung hymns to the praise of God if I had been distracted by the beautiful and interesting things about me." She also once said, "when I get to heaven, the first face that shall ever gladden my sight will be that of my Savior". According to biographer Annie Willis, "had it not been for her affliction she might not have so good an education or have so great an influence, and certainly not so fine a memory".

In 1828, Mercy and Fanny moved to the home of a Mrs. Hawley in Ridgefield, Connecticut. While residing in Ridgefield, they attended the Presbyterian church on the village green. Historian Edith L. Blumhofer described the Crosby home environment as sustained by "an abiding Christian faith". Crosby memorized five chapters of the Bible each week from age 10, with the encouragement of her grandmother and later Mrs. Hawley; by age 15, she had memorized the four gospels, the Pentateuch, the Book of Proverbs, the Song of Solomon, and many of the Psalms. From 1832, a music teacher came to Ridgefield twice a week to give singing lessons to her and some of the other children. Around the same time, she attended her first Methodist church services at the Methodist Episcopal Church, and she was delighted by their hymns.

Crosby enrolled at the New York Institution for the Blind (NYIB) in 1835, just before her 15th birthday. She remained there for eight years as a student, and another two years as a graduate pupil, during which time she learned to play the piano, organ, harp, and guitar, and became a good soprano singer. While she was studying at NYIB in 1838, her mother Mercy remarried and the couple had three children together. Mercy's husband abandoned her in 1844.

== Early career (1843–1858) ==
After graduation from the NYIB in 1843, Crosby joined a group of lobbyists in Washington, D.C., arguing for support of education for the blind. She was the first woman to speak in the United States Senate when she read a poem there. She appeared before the joint houses of Congress and recited these lines:

O ye, who here from every state convene,
Illustrious band! may we not hope the scene
You now behold will prove to every mind
Instruction hath a ray to cheer the blind.

Crosby was among the students from the NYIB who gave a concert for Congress on January 24, 1844. She recited an original composition calling for an institution for educating the blind in every state which was praised by John Quincy Adams, among others. Two days later, she was among a group of Blind Institution students who gave a presentation to notable people at Trenton, New Jersey, where she recited an original poem calling for the aid and education of the blind. President James K. Polk visited the NYIB in 1845 and Crosby recited a poem that she composed for the occasion which praised "republican government". In 1851, she addressed the New York state legislature.

In April 1846, Crosby spoke before a joint session of the United States Congress, with delegations from the Boston and Philadelphia Institutions for the Blind, "to advocate support for the education of the blind in Boston, Philadelphia, and New York". She testified before a special congressional subcommittee, and she performed in the music room at the White House for President Polk and his wife. Among the songs that she sang as she accompanied herself on the piano was her own composition:

Our President! We humbly turn to thee –
Are not the blind the objects of thy care?

In 1846, Crosby was an instructor at the NYIB and was listed as a "graduate pupil". She subsequently joined the school's faculty, teaching grammar, rhetoric, and history; she remained there until three days before her wedding on March 5, 1858. While teaching at the NYIB, she befriended future US president Grover Cleveland then aged 17. The two spent many hours together at the end of each day, and he often transcribed the poems that she dictated to him. He wrote for her a recommendation which was published in her 1906 autobiography. She wrote a poem that was read at the dedication of Cleveland's birthplace in Caldwell, New Jersey, in March 1913, being unable to attend due to her health.

== Christian faith ==
Crosby was a longtime member of the Sixth Avenue Bible Baptist Church in Brooklyn, New York, which has been in existence continuously since 1867. She served as a consecrated Baptist missionary, deaconess, and lay preacher. She wrote hymns together with her minister Robert Lowry, such as "All the Way My Savior Leads Me" and many others.

There was a cholera epidemic in New York City from May to November 1849, and she remained at the NYIB to nurse the sick rather than leaving the city. Subsequently, according to Blumhofer, "Crosby seemed worn, languid, even depressed" when the Institution re-opened in November, forcing her to teach a lighter load. According to Bernard Ruffin:

In this atmosphere of death and gloom, Fanny became increasingly introspective over her soul's welfare. She began to realize that something was lacking in her spiritual life. She knew that she had gotten wrapped up in social, political, and educational reform, and did not have a true love for God in her heart.

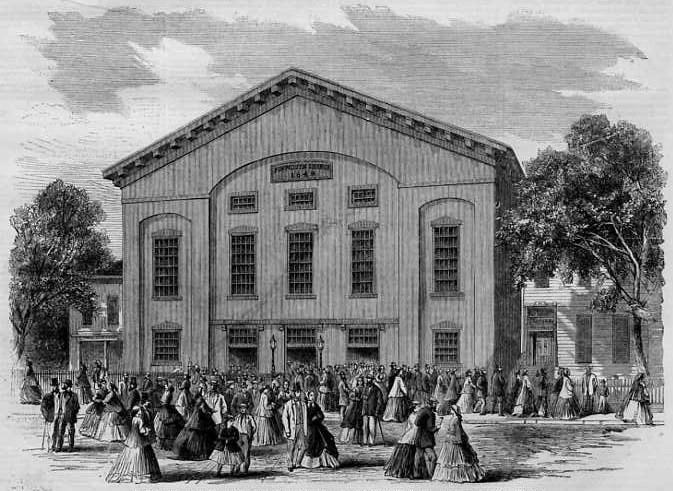
Plymouth Church of the Pilgrims, Brooklyn

In the Fall of 1850, after being troubled by a dream, Crosby went to revival meetings at the thirteenth Street Methodist Church in New York city where she twice vainly sought the peace with God she craved, but which she finally realized on November 30 during a congregational hymn of consecration while seeking God alone at the altar. Crosby stated that she then felt "flooded with celestial light."

Crosby attended churches of various denominations until spring 1887, including the Plymouth Church of the Pilgrims in Brooklyn Heights led by Congregationalist abolitionist Henry Ward Beecher who was an innovator with church music. She attended the Trinity Episcopal church, and liked to worship at the North West Dutch Reformed church and the Central Presbyterian Church (later known as the Brooklyn Tabernacle). In later life, she said that one of her favorite preachers was Theodore Ledyard Cuyler, minister of the North East Dutch Reformed Church.

Tradition insists that she was a member in good standing of the John Street Methodist Episcopal Church in Manhattan, but there are no contemporaneous records to confirm this. By 1869, she attended the Chelsea Methodist Episcopal Church.

Crosby was not identified publicly with the American holiness movement of the second half of the 19th century and left no record of an experience of entire sanctification. She was, however, a fellow traveler of the Wesleyan holiness movement, including prominent members of the American Holiness movement in her circle of friends and attending Wesleyan/Holiness camp meetings. For example, she was a friend of Walter and Phoebe Palmer, "the mother of the holiness movement" and "arguably the most influential female theologian in Christian history", and their daughter Phoebe Knapp, with whom she wrote "Blessed Assurance"; she often visited the Methodist camp grounds at Ocean Grove, New Jersey, as their guest. She vacationed each summer at Ocean Grove between 1877 and 1897 (and possibly longer), where she would speak in the Great Auditorium and hold receptions in her cottage to meet her admirers.

Cornell Methodist Episcopal Church (1906)

In 1877, Crosby met William J. Kirkpatrick, one of the most prolific composers of gospel song tunes and "the most prominent publisher in the Wesleyan/Holiness Movement". She called him "Kirkie" and wrote many hymns with him. Some of her hymns reflected her Wesleyan beliefs, including her call to consecrated Christian living in "I Am Thine, O Lord" (1875):

Consecrate me now to Thy service, Lord,
By the power of grace divine.
Let my soul look up with a steadfast hope,
And my will be lost in Thine.

In 1887, she joined the Cornell Memorial Methodist Episcopal Church by "confession of faith".

== Early writing career (1841–1865) ==
=== Poetry ===
A young Fanny Crosby

Crosby's earliest published poem was sent without her knowledge to P. T. Barnum, who published it in his The Herald of Freedom. She was examined by George Combe, a visiting Scottish phrenologist, who pronounced her a "born poetess". She had experienced some temporary opposition to her poetry by the faculty of the Blind Institution, but her inclination to write was encouraged by this experience. The Institution found Hamilton Murray to teach her poetic composition, though he admitted his own inability to compose poetry.

In 1841, New York Herald published Crosby's eulogy on the death of President William Henry Harrison, thus beginning her literary career. Her poems were published frequently in The Saturday Evening Post, the Clinton Signal, the Fireman's Journal, and the Saturday Emporium.

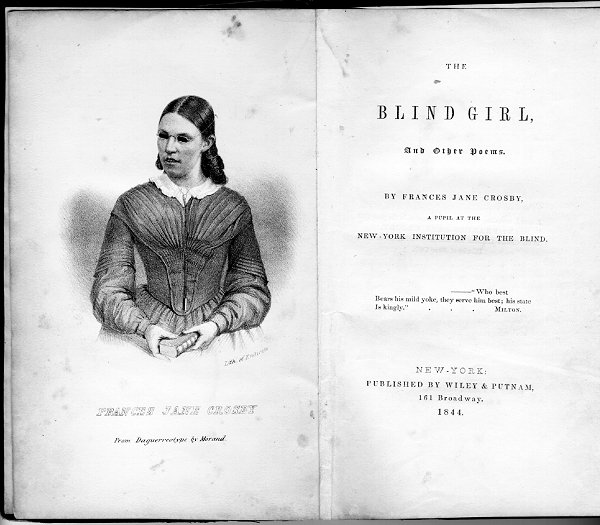
Frontispiece of The Blind Girl (1844)

Crosby was reluctant to have her poems published, as she considered them to be "unfinished productions", but she acquiesced eventually because it would publicize the Institution and raise funds for it. (She had had an illness that caused her to leave the NYIB in order to recuperate.) Her first book A Blind Girl and Other Poems was published in April 1844 after encouragement by the Institution, including "An Evening Hymn" based on Psalm 4:8, which she described as her first published hymn. In 1853, her Monterey and Other Poems was published which included poems focusing on the recent Mexican–American War, and a poem pleading for the US to help those affected by the Great Famine of Ireland. She stated in her 1903 autobiography, edited by Will Carleton, that she "was under a feeling of sadness and depression at this time".

In 1853, Crosby's poem "The Blind Orphan Girl" was included in Caroline M. Sawyer's The History of the Blind Vocalists. Her third book A Wreath of Columbia's Flowers was published in 1858 at about the time when she resigned from the Blind Institution and got married. It contains four short stories and 30 poems.

=== Popular songs ===
Crosby had been inspired by the success of the melodies of Stephen Foster, so she and George F. Root wrote at least 60 secular "people's songs" or parlour songs between August 1851 and 1857, some for the popular minstrel shows. (Root had taught music at the Blind Institution from 1845–50). The minstrel shows had a negative reputation among some Christians and classical musicians, so their participation in these compositions was deliberately obscured. "Like many cultured people of the day," writes Bernard Ruffin, "[Root] considered native American music rather crude." He chose to "Europeanize" his name (like many American artists and musicians of that era) to "George Friederich Wurzel" (German for Root), while Crosby's name was sometimes omitted altogether.

For many years, Crosby was usually paid only $1 or $2 per poem, with all rights to the song being retained by the composer or publisher of the music.

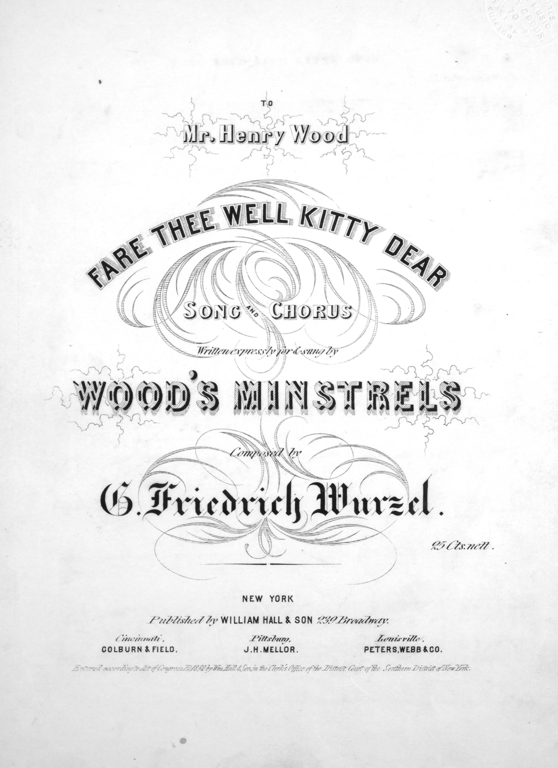
"Fare Thee Well, Kitty Dear" (1852)

In the summer of 1851, George Root and Crosby both taught at the North Reading Musical Institute in North Reading, Massachusetts. Their first song was "Fare Thee Well, Kitty Dear" (1851) which evoked old-South imagery. Crosby's lyrics were based on a suggestion by Root, which she described as "the grief of a colored man on the death of his beloved." It was written for and performed exclusively by Henry Wood's Minstrels and published by John Andrews, who specialized in printing "neat, quick & cheap," according to Karen Linn. "This song was not a hit, and had no lasting influence," according to Linn, as "its style is far too literary, the words not in dialect, the cause of sorrow seems to be a lover (rather than 'massa', or Little Eva, or homesickness: all more appropriate causes for slave sorrow according to the popular culture)". In 1852, Root signed a three-year contract with William Hall & Son.

Despite this initial setback, Crosby continued to teach at North Reading during her vacations in 1852 and 1853, where she wrote the lyrics for many of her collaborations with Root. Among their joint compositions were "Bird of the North" (1852) and "Mother, Sweet Mother, Why Linger Away?" (1852).

Crosby and Root's first successful popular song was "The Hazel Dell" (1853), a sentimental ballad described by its publisher as "a very pretty and easy song, containing the elements of great popularity," released as the work of G.F. Wurzel toward the end of 1853. It was a hit that was "one of the most popular songs in the country" because of its performance by both Henry Wood's Minstrels and Christy's Minstrels, selling more than 200,000 copies of sheet music. It is described as being on "the fringes of blackface minstrelsy, although it lacks dialect or any hint of buffoonery", about a beautiful girl who died young.

An article in the December 1854 issue of New York Musical Review proclaimed the death of "Negro minstrelsy." It listed "Hazel Dell," along with Stephen Foster's songs "Old Folks at Home" (1851) and "My Old Kentucky Home" (1853), as popular songs that were evidence of the "bleaching process... observable in the gradual rejection of the plantation, and the adoption of sentiments and poetic forms of expression, characteristic rather of the intelligent Caucasian".

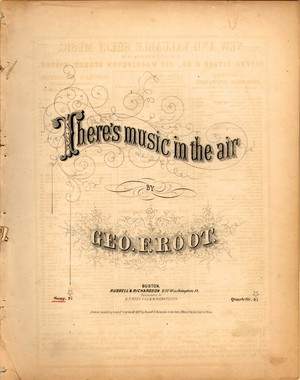
"There's Music in the Air" (1857)

Toward the end of 1853, William Hall & Son released "Greenwood Bell" at the same time as "Hazel Dell", but credited it to Root and Crosby. "Greenwood Bell" describes the funerals of a child, a young man, and an aged person, and the tolling of the bell at the Greenwood Cemetery. Other songs written by Crosby and Root included "O How Glad to Get Home" and "They Have Sold Me Down the River (The Negro Father's Lament)" (1853). Their song "There's Music in the Air" (1854) became a hit song and was listed in Variety Music Cavalcade as one of the most popular songs of 1854; it was in songbooks until at least the 1930s and became a college song at Princeton University.

"Rosalie, the Prairie Flower" (1855) Lyrics: Fanny Crosby Music: Wurzel (George F. Root)

Crosby-Root songs were published by other publishers after the expiration of Root's contract with William Hall & Son in 1855 (and after being rejected by Nathan Richardson of Russell & Richardson of Boston), including Six Songs by Wurzel published in 1855 by S. Brainard's Sons of Cleveland, Ohio. These six Root-Crosby songs were "O How Glad to Get Home," "Honeysuckle Glen," "The Church in the Wood," "All Together Now," and "Proud World, Good-by." The most popular of these songs was "Rosalie, the Prairie Flower", about the death of a young girl. It was popularized in the 1850s by the Christy Minstrels; it sold more than 125,000 copies of sheet music and earned nearly $3,000 (~$17,950 in 2025) in royalties for Root — and almost nothing for Crosby. Crosby also wrote the words for popular songs for other composers, including "There is a Bright and Sunny Spot" (1856) for Clare W. Beames.

=== Cantatas ===
Between 1852 and 1854, Crosby wrote the librettos of three cantatas for Root. Their first was The Flower Queen; The Coronation of the Rose (1852), often described as "the first secular cantata written by an American." It is an opera "in all but name," described as a "popular operetta" which "illustrated nineteenth-century American romanticism." In her 1906 autobiography, Crosby explained the theme of this cantata:

an old man becoming tired of the world, decides to become a hermit; but, as he is about to retire to his lonely hut, he hears a chorus singing, "Who shall be queen of the flowers?" His interest is at once aroused; and on the following day he is asked to act as judge in a contest where each flower urges her claims to be queen of all the others. At length the hermit chooses the rose for her loveliness; and in turn she exhorts him to return to the world and to his duty.

The Flower Queen was written as "a work for teenage girls (scored for first and second soprano and alto)." It was performed first on March 11, 1853, by the young ladies of Jacob Abbott's Springer Institute, and almost immediately repeated by Root's students at the Rutgers Female Institute; it was praised by R. Storrs Willis. It was performed an estimated 1,000 times throughout the United States in the first four years after its publication. The success of The Flower Queen and subsequent cantatas brought great acclaim and fortune to Root, with little of either for Crosby.

The second Root-Crosby cantata was Daniel, or the Captivity and Restoration, based on the Old Testament's story of Daniel. It was composed in 1853 for Root's choir at the Mercer Street Presbyterian Church in Manhattan. This cantata comprised 35 songs, with music composed with William Batchelder Bradbury and words by Crosby and Union Theological Seminary student Chauncey Marvin Cady. Some of its principal choruses were first performed on July 15, 1853, by the students at Root's New York Normal Institute.

In 1854, Root and Crosby collaborated to compose The Pilgrim Fathers, described as an "antebellum landmark" in dramatic cantatas. According to Blumhofer, it "featured the contemporary evangelical reading of American history." Crosby wrote the libretto for a cantata entitled The Excursion, with music by Baptist music professor Theodore Edson Perkins, one of the founders of New York music publishing house Brown & Perkins. In 1886, Crosby and William Howard Doane wrote Santa Claus' Home; or, The Christmas Excursion, a Christmas cantata published by Biglow & Main.

=== Political songs ===
In addition to poems of welcome to visiting dignitaries, Crosby wrote songs of a political nature, such as about the major battles of the Mexican–American War and the American Civil War.

By the 1840 US Presidential election, she was "an ardent Democrat" and wrote verse against Whig candidate (and ultimate winner) William Henry Harrison. By 1852, she switched her political allegiance from support for the pro-slavery Democrats to the anti-slavery Whigs, writing the poem "Carry Me On" for them in 1852. After the election of Democrat Franklin Pierce as US President in November 1852, she wrote:

The election's past and I'm pierced at last
The locos have gained the day.

Though she considered herself a Democrat at the time, Crosby was a keen admirer of the leading Whig, U.S. Senator Henry Clay of Kentucky, who in 1848 made a tour of large eastern cities. He visited the New York Institution for the Blind in New York City, where Crosby lived. The visit came two years after the death of Henry Clay Jr., in the Mexican–American War. Crosby recalled that "the great statesman was never quite himself after his son's death, and I purposely avoided all mention of it in the address of welcome on the day he came to visit us, lest I mighty wound the heart of the man whom I had learned not only to venerate but to love; for Mr. Clay was always an especial favorite among public men. There was a strength in his character and an earnestness in his speeches that appealed to me more than I can tell. ... I would have challenged any person, whether Whig or Democrat, Northerner or Southerner to come within range of the man's eloquence without being moved to admiration and profound respect; for his personal magnetism was wonderful."

Crosby was a strict abolitionist and supported Abraham Lincoln and the newly created Republican Party. After the Civil War, she was a devoted supporter of the Grand Army of the Republic and its political aims.

=== Patriotic songs ===
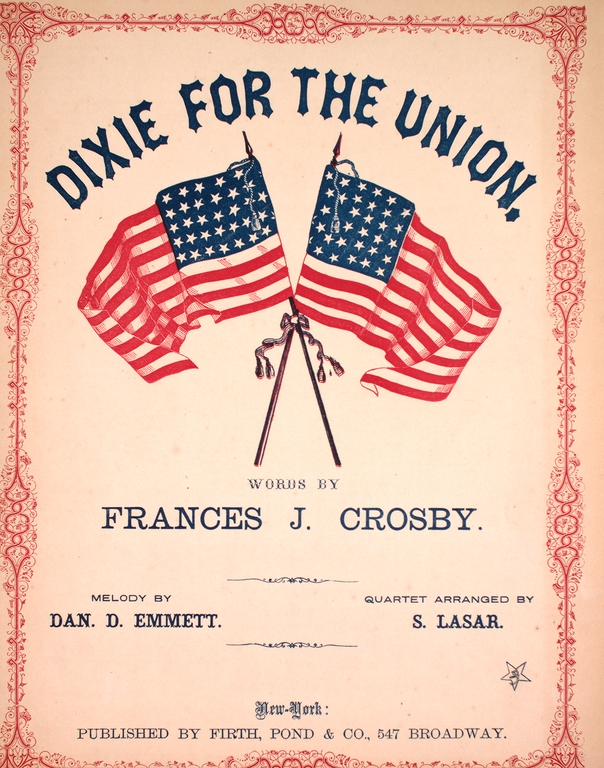
"Dixie for the Union" (1861) Lyrics: Fanny Crosby Music: Dan D. Emmett

During the American Civil War, according to Edith Blumhofer, Crosby "vented patriotism in verse," and it evoked "an outpouring of songs—some haunting, some mournful, some militaristic, a few even gory", but "her texts testified to her clear moral sense about the issues that fomented in the war years." She wrote many poems supporting the Union cause, including "Dixie for the Union" (1861), written before the outbreak of hostilities to the tune of Dixie (the tune adopted later by the Confederate States of America as a patriotic anthem). The first of the five stanzas is:

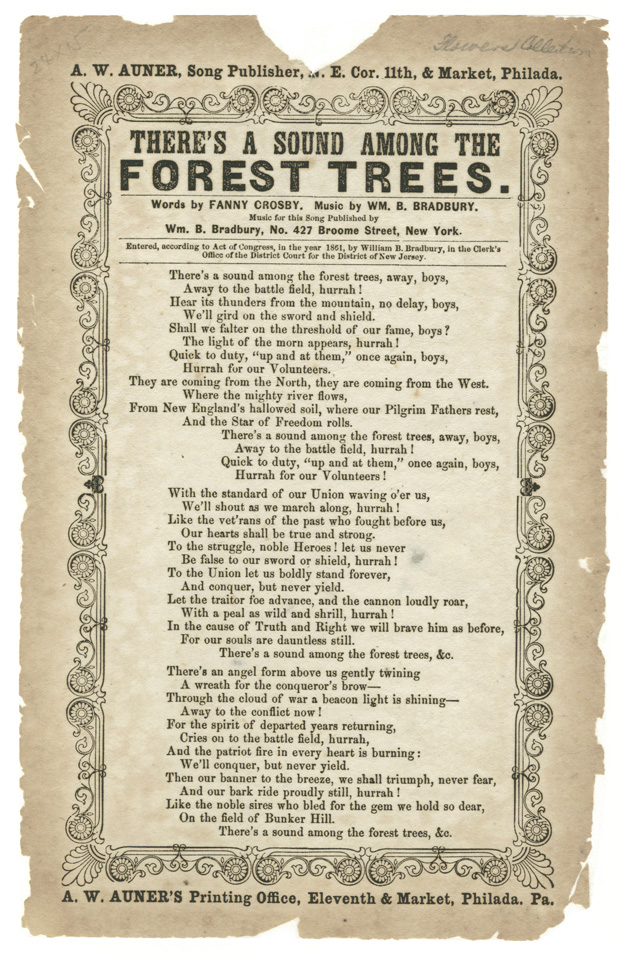
"A Sound Among the Forest Trees" (1864)

On! ye Patriots, to the battle
Hear Fort Moultrie's cannon rattle:
Then away, then away, then away to the fight!
Go, meet those Southern traitors, with iron will,
And should your courage falter, Boys,
Remember Bunker Hill — Hurrah.
Chorus: Hurrah — Hurrah, The Stars and Stripes forever Hurrah — Hurrah, Our Union shall not sever.

Crosby wrote the words and William B. Bradbury composed the music, soon after they met in February 1864, for the popular patriotic Civil War song "There is a Sound Among the Forest Trees". Her text encourages volunteers to join the Union forces and incorporates references to the history of the United States, including the Pilgrim Fathers and the Battle of Bunker Hill.

Also during the American Civil War, Crosby wrote "Song to Jeff Davis" directed at Jefferson Davis, the president of the Confederate States of America, which expressed her belief in the morality of the Union cause: "Our stars and stripes are waving, And Heav'n will speed our cause". She also wrote "Good-By, Old Arm," a tribute to wounded soldiers with music by Philip Philips, "Our Country," and "A Tribute (to the memory of our dead heroes)."

As late as September 1908, Crosby wrote patriotic poems for the Daughters of the American Revolution, including "The State We Honor" which extolls the virtues of her adopted state of Connecticut.

== Marriage and family ==
In the summer of 1843, Crosby met Alexander van Alstyne Jr. (sometimes spelled van Alstine or van Alsteine), called "Van" by his friends. He also was blind and enrolled at the NYIB, where he was a casual acquaintance of Crosby and sometimes a student in her classes. He was a teacher at NYIB for two years from 1855; during this time, the couple were engaged to be married, necessitating her resignation from NYIB three days prior to their wedding at Maspeth, New York, on March 5, 1858.

Fanny and Alexander van Alstyne

After their wedding, the van Alstynes lived in a small home in the rural village of Maspeth, New York, with a population of about 200 people—present-day Maspeth, Queens, New York, and no longer rural.

At her husband's insistence, Crosby continued to use her maiden name as her literary name, but she chose to use her married name on all legal documents. However, according to biographer Edith Blumhofer: "Despite her education, her handwriting was barely legible, and on legal documents she signed her name with an X witnessed by friends".

In 1859, the van Alstynes had a daughter named Frances who died in her sleep soon after birth. Some believe that the cause was typhoid fever, although Darlene Neptune speculates that it may have been SIDS, and that Crosby's hymn "Safe in the Arms of Jesus" was inspired by her death.

After the death of their daughter, Van became increasingly reclusive; Crosby never spoke publicly about being a mother, aside from mentioning it in a few interviews towards the end of her life: "Now I am going to tell you of something that only my closest friends know. I became a mother and knew a mother's love. God gave us a tender babe but the angels came down and took our infant up to God and to His throne". In late 1859, the van Alstynes moved frequently, "establishing a pattern that continued for the rest of their lives", and never owned their own home, living in rented accommodation without a lease.

In addition to Crosby's income as a poet and lyricist, Van played the organ at two churches in New York City, and gave private music lessons. The couple could have lived comfortably on their combined income, but Crosby "had other priorities and gave away anything that was not necessary to their daily survival". Van and Fanny organized concerts with half the proceeds given to aid the poor, in which she gave recitations of her poems and sang, and he played various instruments. Van provided the music for some of her poetry, although Fanny indicated that "his taste was mostly for the wordless melodies of the classics". The van Alstynes collaborated on the production of a hymnal featuring only hymns written by them, but it was rejected by Biglow and Main—ostensibly because the directors believed that the public would not buy a hymnal featuring only two composers, but probably due to the complexity of the melodies. In 1874, Crosby was reported to be "living in a destitute condition".

For many years, the van Alstynes had "a most unusual married life", and lived together only intermittently. By 1880, they had separated, living both separately and independently due to a rift in their marriage of uncertain origin. At one point soon after, Crosby moved to a "dismal flat" at 9 Frankfort Street, near one of Manhattan's worst slums on the Lower East Side. Thereafter, she lived at several different addresses in and around Manhattan.

Van Alstyne rarely accompanied Crosby when she traveled, and she vacationed without him. Despite living separately for more than two decades, Crosby insisted that they "maintained an amiable relationship", kept in contact with one another, and even ministered together on occasions in this period. For example, Alexander played a piano solo at the third annual reunion of the Underhill Society of America on June 15, 1895, in Yonkers, New York, while Crosby read an ode to Captain John Underhill, the progenitor of the American branch of the Underhill family. Her only recorded admission of marital unhappiness was in 1903, when she commented on her late husband in Will Carleton's This is My Story: "He had his faults—and so have I mine, but notwithstanding these, we loved each other to the last".

In 1896, Crosby moved from Manhattan to an apartment in a poor section of Brooklyn, living with friends at South Third Street, Brooklyn, near the home of Ira D. Sankey and his wife Fannie, and near the mansion owned by Phoebe Knapp.

== Career in writing hymns (1864–1915) ==
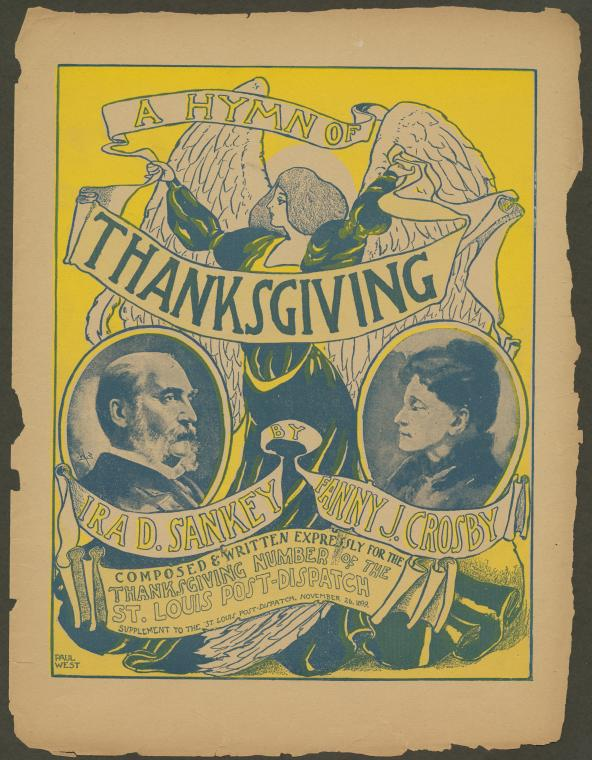
"A Hymn of Thanksgiving" sheet music cover – November 26, 1899

Crosby was "the most prolific of all nineteenth-century American sacred song writers". By the end of her career she had written almost 9,000 hymns, using scores of pen names assigned to her by publishers who wanted to disguise the proliferation of her compositions in their publications.

It is estimated that books containing her lyrics sold 100 million copies. However, due to the low regard for lyricists in the popular song industry during her lifetime, and what June Hadden Hobbs sees as "the hypocrisy of sacred music publishers" which resulted for Crosby in "a sad and probably representative tale of exploitation of female hymn writers", and the contemporary perception that "Crosby made a very profitable living off writing songs that were sung (and played) by the masses", "like many of the lyricists of the day, Crosby was exploited by copyright conventions that assigned rights not to the lyricist but to the composer of the music... Crosby was paid a flat fee of one or two dollars a hymn". In her 1906 autobiography, Crosby insisted she wrote her hymns "in a sanctified manner", and never for financial or commercial considerations, and that she had donated her royalties to "worthy causes".

Crosby set a goal of winning a million people to Christ through her hymns, and whenever she wrote a hymn she prayed it would bring women and men to Christ, and kept careful records of those reported to have been saved through her hymns.

Referring to Crosby's songs, the Dictionary of American Religious Biography indicated: "by modern standards her work may be considered mawkish or too sentimental. But their simple, homey appeal struck a responsive chord in Victorian culture. Their informal ballad style broke away from the staid, formal approach of earlier periods, touching deep emotions in singers and listeners alike. Instead of dismissing her words as maudlin or saccharine, audiences thrilled to them as the essence of genuine, heartfelt Christianity". Crosby's hymns were popular because they placed "a heightened emphasis on religious experiences, emotions, and testimonies" and reflected "a sentimental, romanticized relationship between the believer and Christ", rather than using the negative descriptions of earlier hymns that emphasised the sinfulness of people.

Ann Douglas argues that Crosby was one of the female authors who "emasculated American religion" and helped shift it from "a rigorous Calvinism" to "an anti-intellectual and sentimental mass culture". Feminist scholars have suggested that "emphases in her hymns both revealed and accelerated the feminizing of American evangelicalism".

Her hymns were published by many notable publishers and publishing companies:

- William B. Bradbury published her hymns in his Golden Censer (1864), a book of Sunday School hymns that sold three million copies.
- For several years Crosby contracted to write three hymns a week for Hubert Main, whose Biglow and Main Co. was formed after Bradbury's death. The company purchased 5900 poems from her for use in the Sunday School publications, and published nearly 2000 of them. By 1889, Crosby may have written over 2500 hymns for the combined publishing houses of Bradbury, and Biglow and Main.
- Methodist song publisher Philip Phillips, for whom Crosby wrote a cycle of forty poems based on the Pilgrim's Progress, and the lyrics for an estimated 525 hymns.

Many publishers were hesitant to include a large number of hymns by one singular author. This led Crosby to begin writing under various pseudonyms. These false names included Mrs. C.M. Wilson, Lizzie Edwards, Ella Dale, Grace J. Frances, Rose Atherton, Maud Marion, Leah Carlton, Henrietta E. Blair, and nearly two hundred others.

=== Musical and lyrical collaborators ===
William Howard Doane was an industrialist who became Crosby's principal collaborator in writing gospel music, composing melodies for an estimated 1,500 Crosby's lyrics. Doane and Crosby collaborated through Biglow and Main, and also privately through Doane's Northern Baptist endeavours. Eventually Crosby entrusted to Doane the business aspects of her compositions.

In early 1868 Crosby met wealthy Methodist Phoebe Palmer Knapp, who was married to Joseph Fairchild Knapp, co-founder of the Metropolitan Life Insurance Company. The Knapps published hymnals initially for use in the Sunday School of Saint John's Methodist Episcopal Church in Brooklyn, which was superintended by Joseph F. Knapp for 22 years, while Phoebe Knapp took responsibility for 200 children in the infants' department. They first collaborated on Notes of Joy, the first hymnal edited by Knapp, who also contributed 94 of the 172 tunes, and published by her brother, Walter C. Palmer Jr., in 1869. Of the 21 hymns Crosby contributed to Notes of Joy, including eight as "The Children's Friend", Knapp provided the music for fourteen of them. Their best-known collaboration was "Blessed Assurance", for which Crosby wrote words in the Knapps' music room for a tune written by Knapp, while Crosby was staying at the Knapp Mansion in 1873.

From 1871 to 1908, Crosby worked with Ira Sankey, who helped make her "a household name to Protestants around the world". While Sankey was "the premier promoter" of gospel songs, "Crosby ranked first as their provider". The evangelist team of Sankey and Dwight L. Moody brought many of Crosby's hymns to the attention of Christians throughout the United States and Britain. Crosby was close friends with Sankey and his wife, Frances, and often stayed with them at their home in Northfield, Massachusetts, from 1886 for the annual summer Christian Workers' Conferences, and later in Brooklyn. After Sankey's eyesight was destroyed by glaucoma in March 1903, their friendship deepened and they often continued to compose hymns together at Sankey's harmonium in his home.

=== Crosby's process ===
"The Blood-Washed Throng" (1906)

Crosby described her hymn-writing process: 'It may seem a little old-fashioned, always to begin one's work with prayer, but I never undertake a hymn without first asking the good Lord to be my inspiration.' Her capacity for work was prodigious, and she could often compose six or seven hymns a day. Her poems and hymns were composed entirely in her mind, and she worked on as many as twelve hymns at once before dictating them to an amanuensis. On one occasion, Crosby composed 40 hymns before they were transcribed. Her lyrics would usually be transcribed by "Van" or later by her half-sister, Carolyn "Carrie" Ryder or her secretary Eva C. Cleaveland, as Crosby herself could write little more than her name. While Crosby had musical training, she did not compose the melodies for most of her lyrics. In 1903, Crosby claimed that "Spring Hymn" was the only hymn for which she wrote both the words and music.

In 1906 Crosby composed both the words and music for "The Blood-Washed Throng", which was published and copyrighted by gospel singer Mary Upham Currier, a distant cousin who had been a well-known concert singer. While teaching at the NYIB, Crosby studied music under George F. Root, until his resignation in November 1850.

In 1921, Edward S. Ninde wrote: "None would claim that she was a poetess in any large sense. Her hymns... have been severely criticised. Dr. Julian, the editor of the Dictionary of Hymnology, says that 'they are, with few exceptions, very weak and poor,' and others insist that they are 'crudely sentimental'. Some hymn books will give them no place whatever". According to Glimpses of Christian History, Crosby's "hymns have sometimes been criticized as 'gushy and mawkishly sentimental' and critics have often attacked both her writing and her theology. Nonetheless, they were meaningful to her contemporaries and hymn writer George C. Stebbins stated, 'There was probably no writer in her day who appealed more to the valid experience of the Christian life or who expressed more sympathetically the deep longings of the human heart than Fanny Crosby.' And many of her hymns have stood the test of time, still resonating with believers today".

== Rescue missions and later life ==
Manuscript of Crosby's "The Rescue Band" (1895)

Crosby will probably always be best known for her hymns, yet she wanted to be seen primarily as a rescue mission worker. According to Keith Schwanz:

At the end of her life, Fanny's concept of her vocation was not that of a celebrated gospel songwriter, but that of a city mission worker. In an interview that was published in the March 24, 1908, issue of the New Haven Register, Fanny said that her chief occupation was working in missions.

Many of Fanny's hymns emerged from her involvement in the city missions, including "More Like Jesus" (1867), "Pass Me Not, O Gentle Saviour" (1868), and "Rescue the Perishing" (1869), which became the "theme song of the home missions movement" and was "perhaps the most popular city mission song", with its "wedding of personal piety and compassion for humanity". She celebrated the rescue mission movement in her 1895 hymn "The Rescue Band".

Crosby had lived for decades in such areas of Manhattan as Hell's Kitchen, the Bowery, and the Tenderloin. She was aware of the great needs of immigrants and the urban poor, and was passionate to help those around her through urban rescue missions and other compassionate ministry organizations. "From the time I received my first check for my poems, I made up my mind to open my hand wide to those who needed assistance". Throughout her life, she was described as having "a horror of wealth", never set prices for her speaking engagements, often refused honoraria, and "what little she did accept she gave away almost as soon as she got it". She and her husband also organized concerts, with half the proceeds given to aid the poor. Throughout New York City, Crosby's sympathies for the poor were well-known, but consisted primarily of indirect involvement by giving contributions from the sale of her poems, and by writing and sending poems for special occasions for these missions to the dispossessed, as well as sporadic visits to those missions.

=== 1865–1880 ===
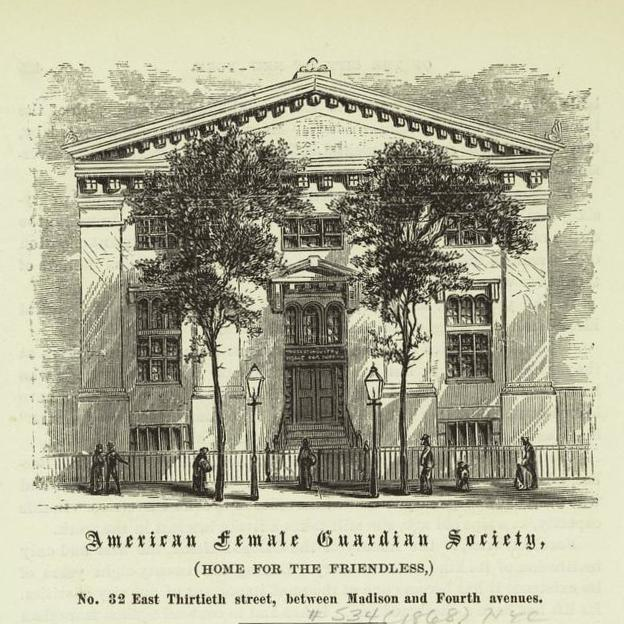
American Female Guardian Society and Home for the Friendless

Crosby supported the American Female Guardian Society and Home for the Friendless (founded in 1834) at 29 East 29th Street, for whom she wrote a hymn in 1865 that was sung by some of the Home's children:

O, no, we are not friendless now,
For God hath reared a home.

Howard Mission (1860s)

She wrote "More Like Jesus Would I Be" in June 1867 expressly for the sixth anniversary of the Howard Mission and Home for Little Wanderers, a nondenominational mission at New Bowery, Manhattan.

She was inspired to write "Pass Me Not, O Gentle Saviour" after speaking at a service at the Manhattan prison in spring 1868, from comments by some prisoners for the Lord not to pass them by. Doane set it to music and published it in Songs of Devotion in 1870. "Pass Me Not" became her first hymn to have global appeal, after it was used by Sankey in his crusades with Moody in Britain in 1874. Sankey said, "No hymn was more popular at the meetings in London in 1875 [sic] than this one."

In April 1868, Crosby wrote "Fifty Years Ago" for the semi-centennial of the New-York Port Society, which was founded in 1818 "for the promotion of the Gospel among the seamen in the Port of New-York".

By July 1869, Crosby was attending at least weekly meetings organized by the interdenominational New York City Mission. A young man was converted through her testimony, and she was inspired to write the words for "Rescue the Perishing" based on a title and a tune given to her by William Howard Doane a few days earlier.

Ira Sankey recalled the origins of "Rescue the Perishing" in his 1907 book My Life and the Story of the Gospel Hymns:

Fanny Crosby returned, one day, from a visit to a mission in one of the worst districts in New York City, where she had heard about the needs of the lost and perishing. Her sympathies were aroused to help the lowly and neglected, and the cry of her heart went forth in this hymn, which has become a battle cry for the great army of Christian workers throughout the world. It has been used very extensively in temperance work, and has been blessed to thousands of souls.

=== 1880–1900 ===
In 1880, aged 60, Crosby "made a new commitment to Christ to serve the poor" and to devote the rest of her life to home missionary work. She continued to live in a dismal flat at 9 Frankfort Street, near one of the worst slums in Manhattan, until about 1884. From this time, she increased her involvement in various missions and homes.

During the next three decades, she dedicated her time as "Aunty Fanny" to work at various city rescue missions, including the McAuley Water Street Mission, the Bowery Mission, the Howard Mission, the Cremore Mission, the Door of Hope, and other skid row missions. She spoke at YMCAs, churches, and prisons about the needs of the urban poor. Additionally, she was a passionate supporter of Frances Willard and the Women's Christian Temperance Union and its endeavors to urge either abstinence or moderation in the use of alcohol.

For example, Crosby wrote the words for the song "The Red Pledge" before 1879, which advocated total abstinence from imbibing alcohol.

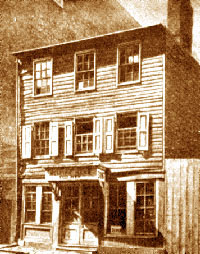
316 Water Street Mission

From about 1880, Crosby attended and supported the Helping Hand for Men in Manhattan (better known as the Water Street Mission), "America's first rescue mission", which was founded by a married couple to minister to alcoholics and the unemployed. Jerry McAuley was a former alcoholic and thief who became a Christian in Sing Sing prison in 1864, and his wife Maria (c. 1847 – September 19, 1919) was a self-described "river thief" and "fallen woman". Crosby often attended the Water Street Mission, "conversing and counseling with those she met".

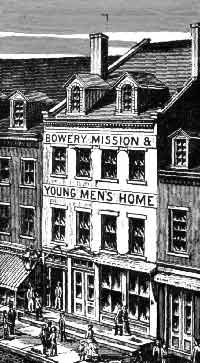
Bowery Mission

Crosby supported the Bowery Mission in Manhattan for two decades, beginning in November 1881. The Bowery Mission welcomed the ministry of women and she worked actively, often attending and speaking in the evening meetings. She addressed large crowds attending the anniversary service each year until the building was razed in a fire in 1897. She would also recite a poem which she'd written for the occasion, many of which were set to music by Victor Benke, the Mission's volunteer organist from 1893–97. Among the songs that she and Benke collaborated on were six published in 1901: "He Has Promised", "There's a Chorus Ever Ringing", "God Bless Our School Today", "Is There Something I Can Do?", "On Joyful Wings", and "Keep On Watching".

Cremorne Mission 104 West 32nd Street, Manhattan

Jerry and Maria McAuley started the Cremorne Mission in 1882 in the Cremorne Garden at 104 West 32nd Street, as a "beachhead in a vast jungle of vice and debauchery known as Tenderloin" (near Sixth Avenue). Crosby attended the nightly 8 pm services, where gospel songs were often sung that were written by her and Doane, including "ballads recalling mother's prayers, reciting the evils of intemperance, or envisioning agonizing deathbed scenes intending to arouse long-buried memories and strengthen resolves". She was inspired to write a prayer after the death of Jerry McAuley in 1884 which was later included in rescue song books:

Lord, behold in Thy compassion
Those who kneel before Thee now;
They are in a sad condition
None can help them, Lord, but Thou.
They are lost, but do not leave them
In their dreary path to roam;
There is pardon, precious pardon
If to Thee by faith they come.

After McAuley's death, Crosby continued to support the Cremorne Mission, now led by Samuel Hopkins Hadley.

Some of the city missions with which Crosby worked were operated by proponents of Wesleyan/Holiness doctrine, including the Door of Hope rescue home founded by socialite Emma Whittemore on October 25, 1890 in a house belonging to A.B. Simpson, intended as "a refuge and a home for girls of the better class who have been tempted from home and right", and to rescue "fallen girls".

=== Later years (1900–1915) ===
Crosby's hymn writing declined in later years, but she was active in speaking engagements and missionary work among America's urban poor almost until she died. She was well known, and she often met with presidents, generals, and other dignitaries. According to Blumhofer, "The popularity of Fanny Crosby's lyrics as well as her winsome personality catapulted her to fame".

Some of her wealthy friends contributed often to her financial needs, such as Doane, Sankey, and Phoebe Knapp, although she still tended to give generously to those whom she saw as less fortunate than herself. Her longtime publisher The Biglow and Main Company paid her a small stipend of $8 each week in recognition of her contributions to their business over the years, even after she submitted fewer lyrics to them. However, Knapp and others believed that Biglow and Main had made enormous profits because of Crosby without compensating her adequately for her contributions, and that she should be living more comfortably in her advanced years.

She had been ill with a serious heart condition for a few months by May 1900, and she still showed some effects from a fall, so her half-sisters traveled to Brooklyn to convince her to move from her room in the home of poet Will Carleton in Brooklyn to Bridgeport, Connecticut. They urged her to live with her widowed half-sister Julia "Jule" Athington and with Jule's widowed younger sister Caroline "Carrie" W. Rider. She and Rider rented a room together, before moving to a rented apartment where they lived until 1906. She transferred her church membership from Cornell Memorial Methodist Church in Manhattan to the First Methodist Church of Bridgeport in 1904, after moving to Bridgeport. Her husband "Van" died on July 18, 1902; he had been living in Brooklyn. She did not attend the funeral due to her own poor health. Phoebe Knapp paid for his burial at Mount Olivet Cemetery, Queens County, New York.

=== Passing of friends, public appreciation ===
Crosby and Rider moved to 226 Wells Street, Bridgeport, Connecticut, in summer 1906 because of Rider's cancer. Carrie died of intestinal cancer in July 1907, and Phoebe Knapp died on July 10, 1908. Weeks later, Ira Sankey died having just sung "Saved by Grace", one of Crosby's most popular compositions.

On May 2, 1911, Crosby spoke to 5,000 people at the opening meeting of the Evangelistic Committee's seventh annual campaign held in Carnegie Hall, after the crowd sang her songs for thirty minutes. On Crosby's 94th birthday in March 1914, Alice Rector and the King's Daughters of the First Methodist Church of Bridgeport, Connecticut, organized a Violet Day to honor her, which was publicized nationally by Hugh Main. In 1912, at the age of 92, Fanny Crosby visited Harvard college, telling professors about her ancestor Simon Crosby, who was one of its founders.

== Carleton controversy (1904–1905) ==
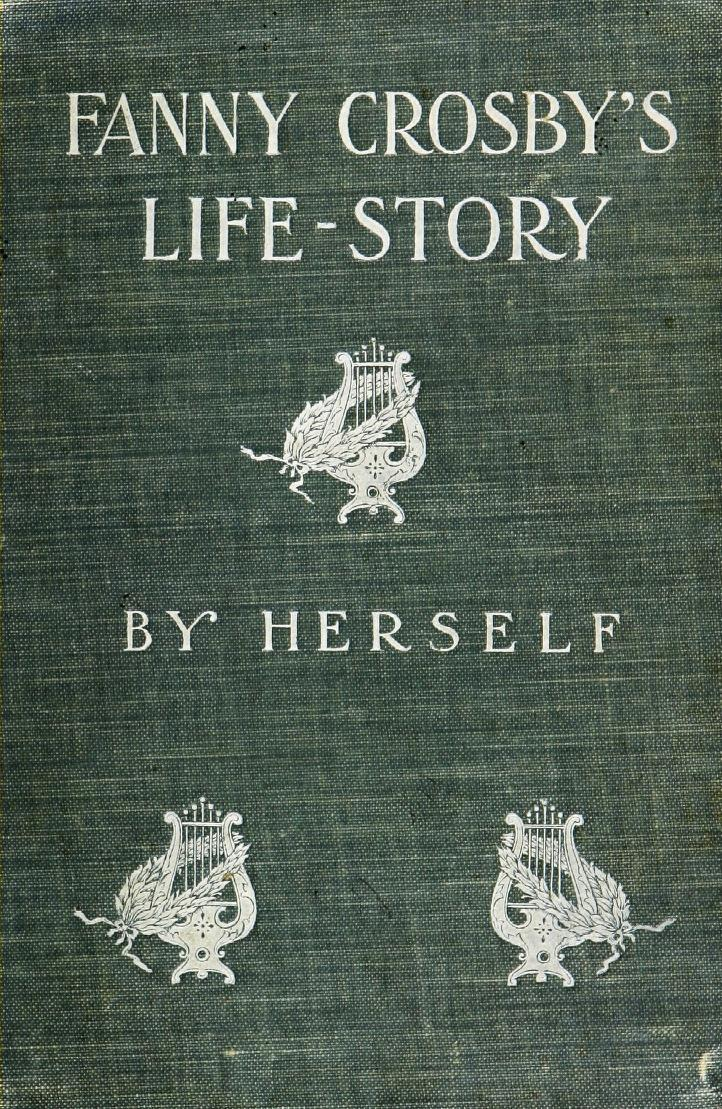
Fanny Crosby's Life-Story (1903)

American poet, author, and lecturer Will Carleton was a wealthy friend with whom Crosby had lived in her last years in Brooklyn. He had been giving lectures on her hymns and life, and had published a series of articles about her in his Every Where magazine in 1901 (which had a peak circulation of 50,000 copies a month), for which he paid her $10 (~$387.00 in 2025) an article. In 1902, he wrote a tribute to her that was published in his Songs of Two Centuries.

Publisher's Advertisement in Fanny Crosby's Life-Story

At Knapp's instigation, Carleton revised those articles and wrote Fanny Crosby's Life-Story, a biography which she authorized initially; it was published by July 1903 and reviewed favorably by The New York Times on July 25. Carleton's book sold for $1 a copy.

This was the first full-length biographical account of Crosby's life, although Robert Lowry had written a 16-page biographical sketch that was published in 1897 in her last book of poems Bells of Evening and Other Verses. In the advertisement at the front of the book, the following statement from "the author" was signed with a facsimile of Crosby's signature: "'Fanny Crosby's Life-Story' is published and sold for my benefit, and I hope by its means to be a welcome guest in many homes". Carleton added:

It is sincerely hoped by the publishers that this book may have as large a sale as possible, in order that the story of its loved author may be an inspiration to many people, and that she may be enabled to have a home of her own, in which to pass the remainder of her days.

=== Publishers' reaction ===
According to Ruffin, Carleton's book "went over like a lead balloon with Fanny's publishers." There was nothing negative written explicitly about Biglow and Main, but there was also little praise for the firm and its members. Crosby is quoted, referring to Biglow and Main: "with whom I have maintained most cordial and even affectionate relations, for many years past". The book did not use any of her hymns that were owned by Biglow and Main. Hubert Main believed that "Will Carleton wanted to ignore the Biglow & Main Company and all its writers as far as possible and set himself up as the one of her friends who was helping her". Biglow and Main believed that Carleton and Phoebe Knapp were guilty of "a brutal attack on Fanny", and that they were plotting to "take over" Crosby. Knapp was not invited to the 40th anniversary reception and dinner held in Manhattan in February 1904 to celebrate Crosby's association with Bradbury and Biglow and Main; according to Blumhofer, she was persona non grata at Biglow and Main.

Biglow and Main were concerned that the book would diminish sales of Crosby's Bells at Evening and Other Verses, which they had published in 1897 and which contained Lowry's biographical sketch of Crosby. They convinced Crosby to write to both Carleton and Knapp, and to threaten to sue Carleton in April 1904. The threatened lawsuit was to obtain information regarding sales of the book, for which she had been promised a royalty of 10 cents per copy, and to seek an injunction preventing further publication. The proposed injunction was on the grounds that she had been misrepresented by Carleton; she believed that he had described her as living alone in poor health and extreme poverty, when in fact she was receiving $25 a week from Biglow and Main and was living with relatives who cared for her. Crosby indicated she had no desire to be a homeowner, and that if she ever lived in poverty, it was by her own choice.

=== Controversy goes public ===
In response to Crosby's letter and threats, Carleton wrote in a letter to The New York Times that he was motivated to write his "labor of love" for Crosby in order to raise money that she might have a home of her own for the first time in her life. He stated that he had:

- interviewed Crosby and transcribed the details of her life
- paid her for her time and materials
- secured her permission to publish the material in his magazine Every Where and in a book
- paid all the expenses for publishing and printing out of his own pocket
- promoted the book in his own time and at his own expense
- remitted $235.20 to her for the royalties owing for the previous eight months at the agreed rate
- sent her additional contributions given by admirers at his lectures

Sankey paid the rent on the Bridgeport house where Crosby lived with her half-sister Carrie. He implied in an article in The Christian that "the Carleton business had been of Satanic origin and commented, echoing the wheat and tares passage in scripture, 'An enemy hath done this'".

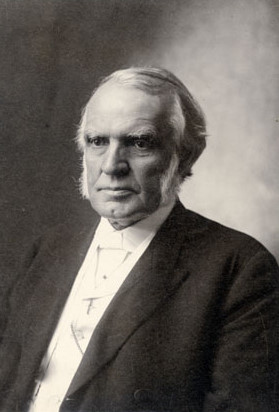
Charles Cardwell McCabe

In 1904, Phoebe Knapp contacted Methodist Episcopal Church Bishop Charles Cardwell McCabe and enlisted his assistance in publicizing Crosby's poverty, raising funds to ameliorate that situation. They secured Crosby's permission to solicit funds for her benefit, and the religious press (including the Christian Advocate) carried McCabe's request for money on her behalf in June 1904, under the heading "Fanny Crosby in Need". McCabe indicated that Crosby's "hymns have never been copyrighted in her own name, she has sold them for small sums to the publishers who hold the copyright themselves, and the gifted authoress has but little monetary reward for hymns that have been sung all over the world".

By July 1904, newspapers reported that Crosby's publishers had issued a statement denying that she was in need of funds, indicating that she never would be, "as they have provided abundantly for her during her entire life", and stating that "Bishop McCabe ... has been grossly deceived by somebody".

Crosby also wrote a letter to Bishop McCabe in response to his fundraising on her behalf. This letter was published at her instigation, permitting him to solicit funds from her friends as "a testimonial of their love", but reiterating that she was not living in poverty, nor was she dying or in poor health. Crosby and her representatives contacted him a week later, and McCabe wrote to The Christian Advocate explaining his rationale for raising funds for her, but stating that he was withdrawing the appeal at her request.

The matter was still not settled in July 1904; however, it came to an end before Fanny Crosby Day in March 1905 after Carleton's wife Adora died suddenly.

=== New Carleton edition ===
In 1905 Carleton issued a new edition of Fannie Crosby, Her Life Work, which was both expanded and "newly illustrated", and despite "the greater expense of production, the price remains One Dollar a copy", with Crosby to "receive the same liberal royalty", as the book was "SOLD FOR THE BLIND AUTHOR'S BENEFIT".

In December 1905 Crosby issued a card protesting the continued sale of Carleton's book, again denying she was "in distress", as she was in "comfortable circumstances and very active", giving lectures nearly once a week. She indicated she had received less than $325 from the sale of the book, that her "requests had been disregarded", but that "when these facts are fully known to all, the publishers can sell the book as they desire; only I have no wish to increase its sale for my own benefit, which, of course, is very small".

Despite Crosby's efforts, Carleton continued to advertise the book for sale until at least 1911. In 1911, Carleton serialised and updated Crosby's life story in Every Where. The 1906 publication of Crosby's own autobiography, Memories of Eighty Years, which, in contrast to Carleton's book, focused on Crosby's hymn-writing years, was sold by subscription and door-to-door, and promoted in lectures by Doane, raised $1,000 for Crosby. For a period Crosby and Knapp were estranged because of the Carleton book, but by early 1905 they had reconciled.

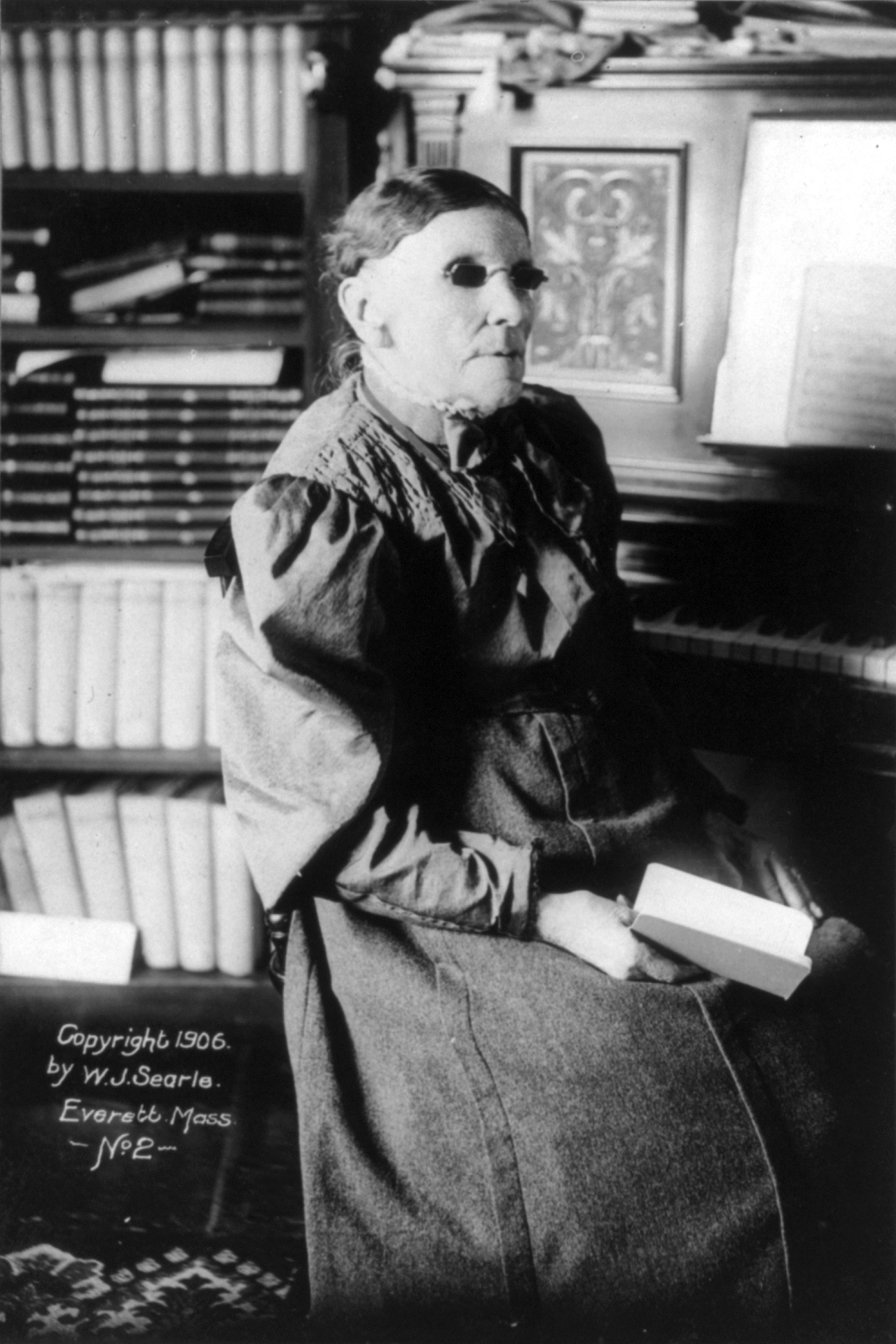
Crosby in later years, 1906.

== Death and legacy ==
Crosby died at Bridgeport of arteriosclerosis and a cerebral hemorrhage on February 12, 1915, after a six-month illness, aged 94. She was buried at Mountain Grove Cemetery in Bridgeport, CT near her mother and other members of her family. Her family erected a very small tombstone at her request which carried the words: "Aunt Fanny: She hath done what she could; Fanny J. Crosby".

Crosby said that her interest in "public affairs has never abated. There are not many people living in this year of grace who had the privilege of meeting such statesmen as Henry Clay, General Scott, and President Polk, but the names of these heroes are recorded with indelible letters among the annals of our national history, and their imperishable deeds are chronicled in characters that no person living should wish to efface. They were men of sterling worth and firm integrity, of whom the rising generation may well learn wisdom and the true principles of national honor and democracy that all of them labored so faithfully to inculcate. ..."

=== Fanny Crosby Day ===
On Sunday, March 26, 1905, Fanny Crosby Day was celebrated in churches of many denominations around the world, with special worship services in honor of her 85th birthday two days earlier. On that day, she attended the First Baptist Church in Bridgeport where Carrie Rider was a member; she spoke in the evening service and was given $85.

In March 1925, about 3,000 churches throughout the United States observed Fanny Crosby Day to commemorate the 105th anniversary of her birth.

=== Fanny Crosby Memorial Home for the Aged (1925–1996) ===
Crosby left money in her will for "the sheltering of senior males who had no other place to live, with these men to pay a nominal fee to the home for their living expenses". In 1923, the King's Daughters of the First Methodist Church of Bridgeport, Connecticut honored Crosby's request to memorialize her by beginning to raise the additional funds needed to establish the Fanny Crosby Memorial Home for the Aged. The non-denominational home was established in the former Hunter house at 1008 Fairfield Avenue, Bridgeport; it opened on November 1, 1925, after a national drive by the Federation of Churches to raise $100,000 to operate it. It operated until 1996 when it was given to the Bridgeport Rescue Mission.

The Enoch Crosby chapter of the Daughters of the American Revolution dedicated a historic roadside marker on October 8, 1934, commemorating her birthplace on the western side of Route 22 in Doansburg, New York, just north of Brewster.

A large memorial stone was dedicated on May 1, 1955, by Crosby's "friends to whom her life was an inspiration"—a stone that "dwarfed the original gravestone"—despite her specific instructions not to erect a large marble monument. It contained the first stanza of "Blessed Assurance".

=== Other honors ===
Crosby was posthumously inducted into the Gospel Music Hall of Fame in 1975. Known as the "Queen of Gospel Song Writers", During 2010 songwriter George Hamilton IV toured Methodist chapels celebrating Fanny's outstanding contribution to gospel music. His presentation included stories of her productive and charitable life, some of her hymns, and a few of his own uplifting songs. While she is not mentioned in The Hymnal 1982, her hymns are included in several more recent hymnals, including Lift Every Voice and Sing II and the African American Heritage Hymnal.
