= William Howard Doane =

American businessman and composer (1832–1915)

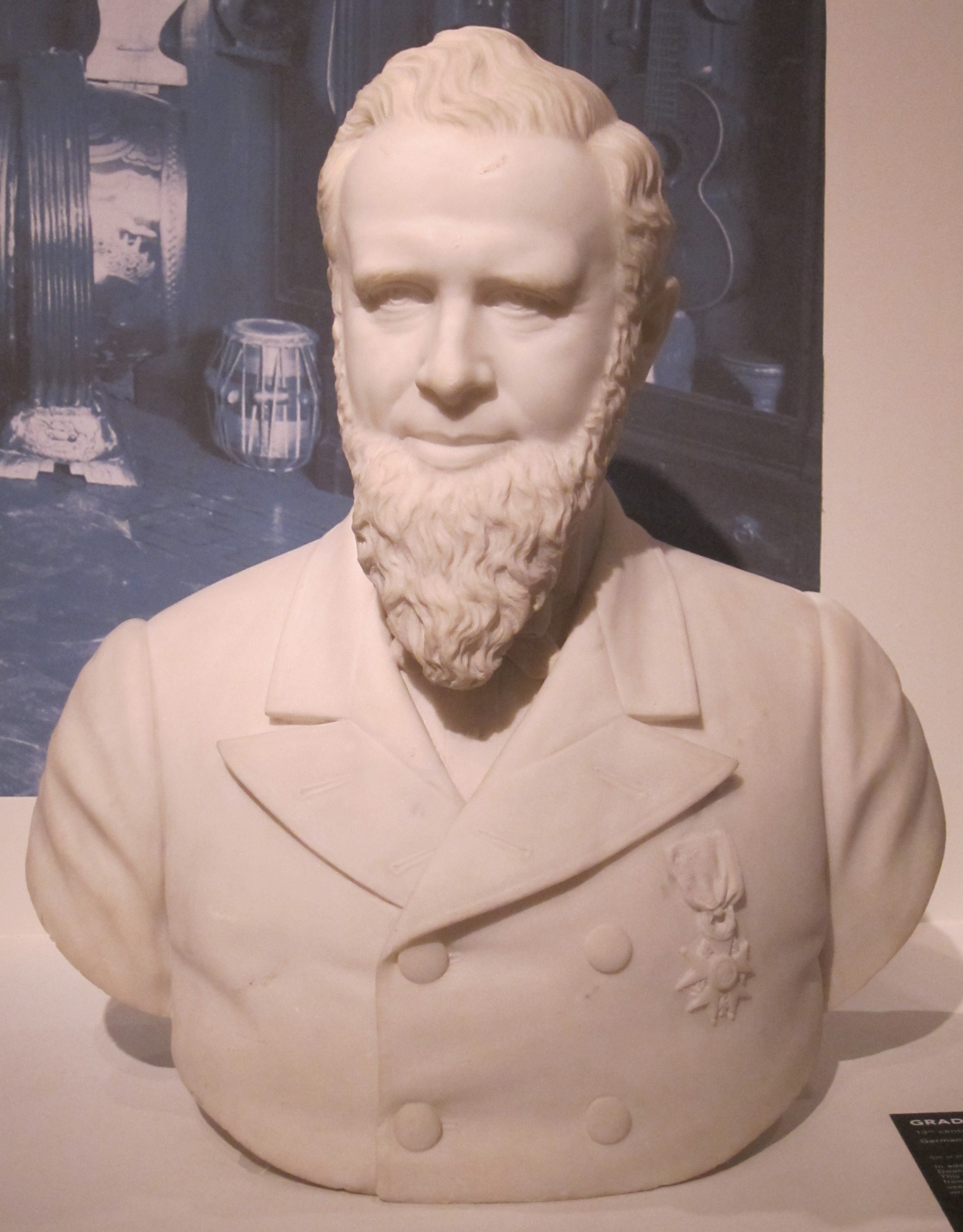
- Marble bust of William Howard Doane at the Cincinnati Art Museum
- Born: William Howard Doane; February 3, 1832; Preston, Connecticut, US
- Died: December 24, 1915 (aged 83); South Orange, New Jersey, US
- Education: Denison University (honorary doctorate)
- Occupations: Manufacturer, inventor, church leader, hymn writer, philanthropist
- Known for: Hymn writing, multiple patents, philanthropy
- Spouse: Frances Mary Treat Doane (m. 1857)
- Children: 2

William Howard Doane (February 3, 1832 – December 24, 1915) was a manufacturer, inventor, hymn writer, choral director, church leader and philanthropist. He composed over 2,000 church hymns. More than seventy patents are credited to him for innovations in woodworking machinery. His philanthropy led to the renaming of the Granville Academy, as the Doane Academy, a boys' and girls' private preparatory school associated with Denison University in Granville, Ohio, where he was a major benefactor.

== Early life ==
Doane was born in Preston, Connecticut on February 3, 1832. His parents were Joseph Howes Doane (1797–1854) and Frances Treat Doane (1799–1881). He was the fifth of eight children. His father was the head of Doane and Treat, cotton manufacturers. At a young age Doane showed impressive musical talent. By early adolescence he was playing the flute, violin and double bass fiddle.

Doane attended the Woodstock Academy, a private secondary school in Woodstock, Connecticut, affiliated with the Congregational church. His musical talents enabled him to serve as the school's choir director. Upon graduation in 1848, Doane went to work in the accounting section of his father's company. From there he moved to J. A. Fay & Company, a woodworking machinery company, for a long career leading to the company's presidency. On November 2, 1857, Doane married Mary Frances Treat, the daughter of his father's partner in their cotton manufacturing business.

== Manufacturer and inventor ==
Doane assumed increasing responsibility with J. A. Fay & Company, as he traveled to assignments in Chicago, Illinois and Cincinnati, Ohio. By the age of thirty-four, Doane had risen to the position of president at the company's new headquarters in Cincinnati.

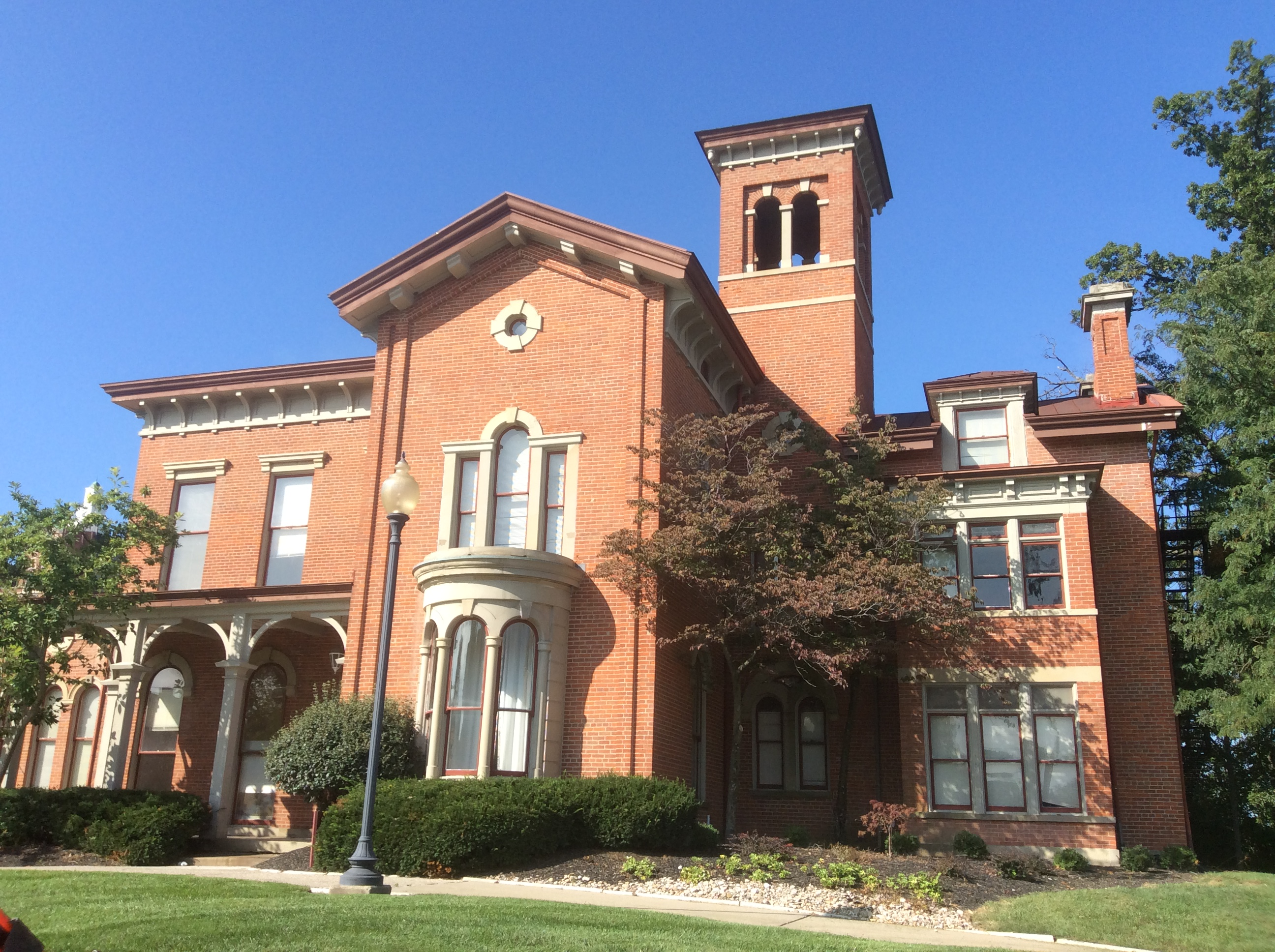
Sunny Side, Doane residence

During his leadership, the company successfully filed many patents for woodmaking machinery. More than seventy patents were registered in Doane's name, giving him credit for the inventions. Doane guided the company through its most successful years.

His business skills extended beyond manufacturing. He was the president of the Central Trust and Safe Deposit Company, as well as a director of the Barney and Smith Car Company of Dayton, Ohio. His achievements earned him "fellow" status in several professional organizations, including the American Society of Mechanical Engineers, the American Society of Mining Engineers, the American Geographical Society and the American Society for the Advancement of Science. Doane emerged as a prominent figure in Cincinnati's business and cultural life. By 1879 his accumulated wealth allowed him to purchase the impressive "Sunny Side" mansion as his family's residence in the city's Mt. Auburn neighborhood. "Sunny Side" is located in the Mount Auburn Historic District at 2223 Mt. Auburn Avenue.

== Church activity and hymn writing ==
Although raised in a Presbyterian household, Doane converted to his mother's Baptist faith, while a young student at Woodstock Academy. This conversion began a lifelong commitment to service in that church, through his musical compositions, choir direction, denominational leadership and philanthropy.

Doane was a prolific composer of Christian hymn tunes. He edited forty-three collections of hymns and composed an estimated 2,300 works, including hundreds of original hymns and hymn settings. He is best known as a longtime collaborator of Fanny Crosby, having written music for an estimated 1,500 of Crosby's poems. As well as hymns, Doane composed secular instrumental, vocal, and choral works, including two cantatas on the legend of Santa Claus.

At Mt. Auburn Baptist Church in Cincinnati's Mt. Auburn neighborhood, Doane served long tenures as superintendent of the Sunday school program and director of the choir. As a denominational leader, he headed the Ohio Baptist Convention Ministers Aid Society. The church is located on Mt. Auburn Avenue, a short distance from the Doane family's "Sunny Side" residence.

== Philanthropy ==
Doane generously supported Baptist churches and institutions. He was an important contributor to the Granville Academy, a school for boys preparing to enter Denison University, a school with strong Baptist heritage. In recognition of his significant support for the academy, including funds to construct conservatory buildings for music and art and a gymnasium, the academy was renamed the Doane Academy in 1895.

=== Benefactor for Denison University ===
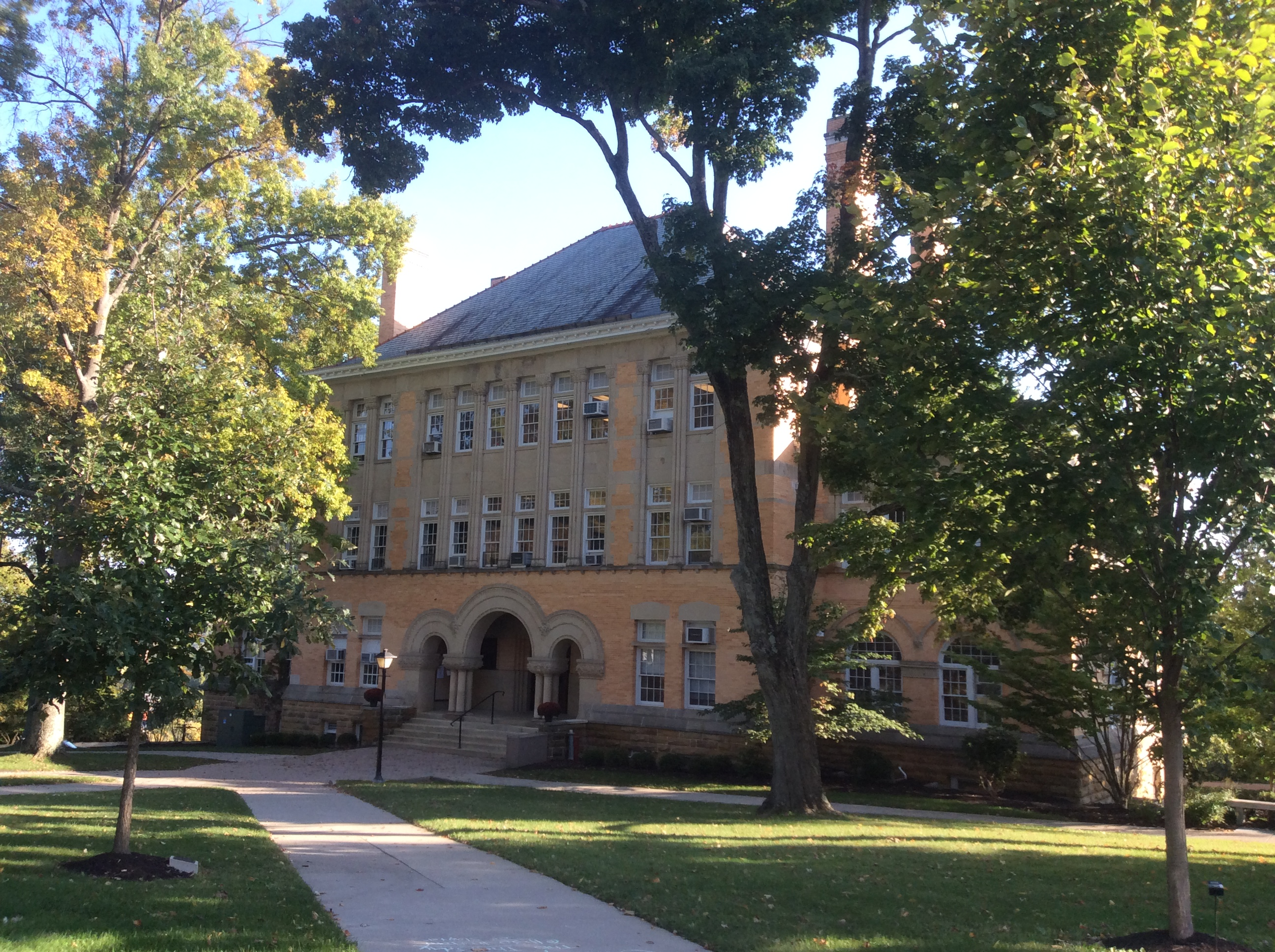
Doane Administration (1895), location of the university's administrative offices

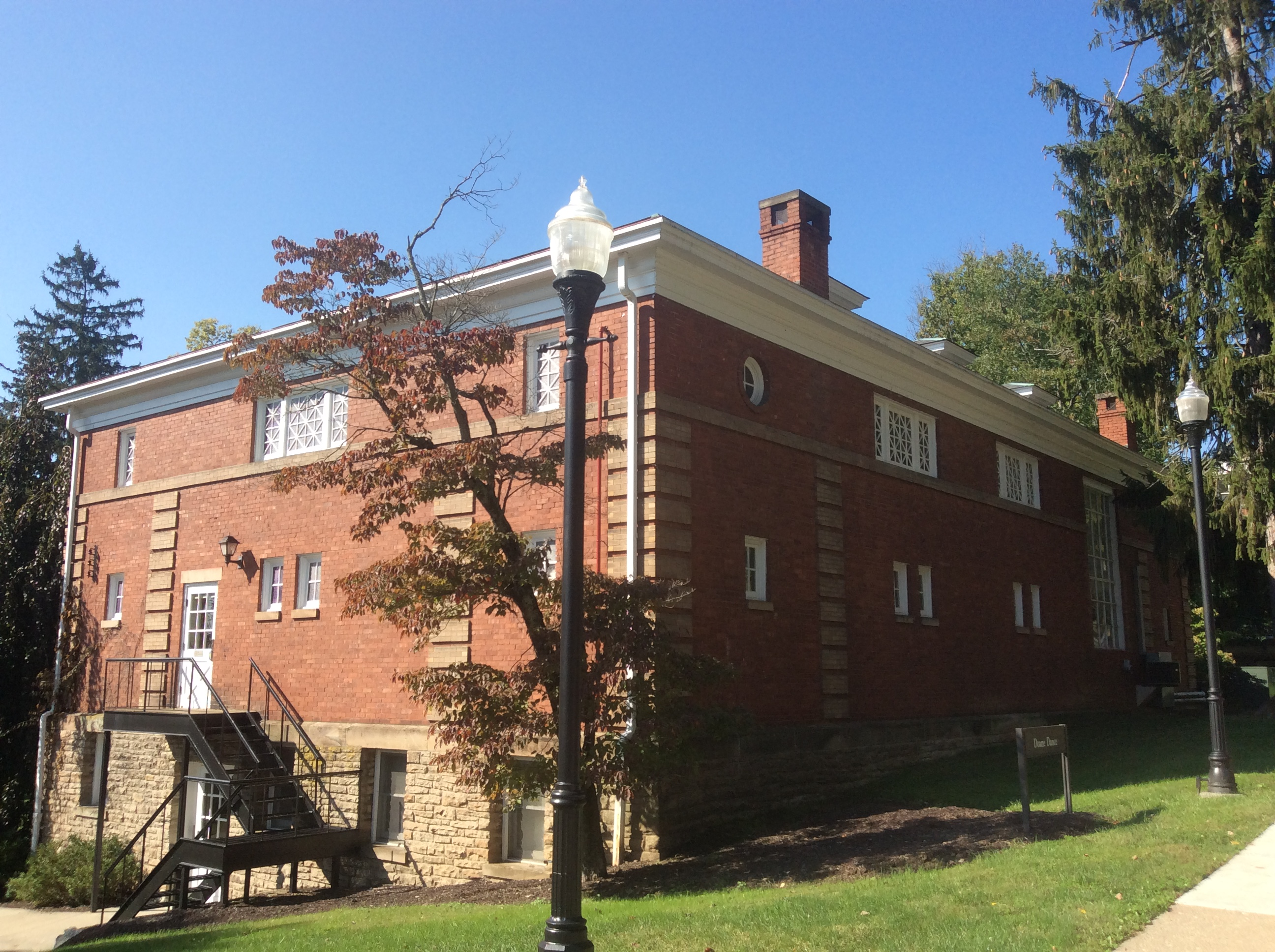
Doane Dance Building (1905), originally a gymnasium, then home to the Art Department, since 1975 home to the Dance Department

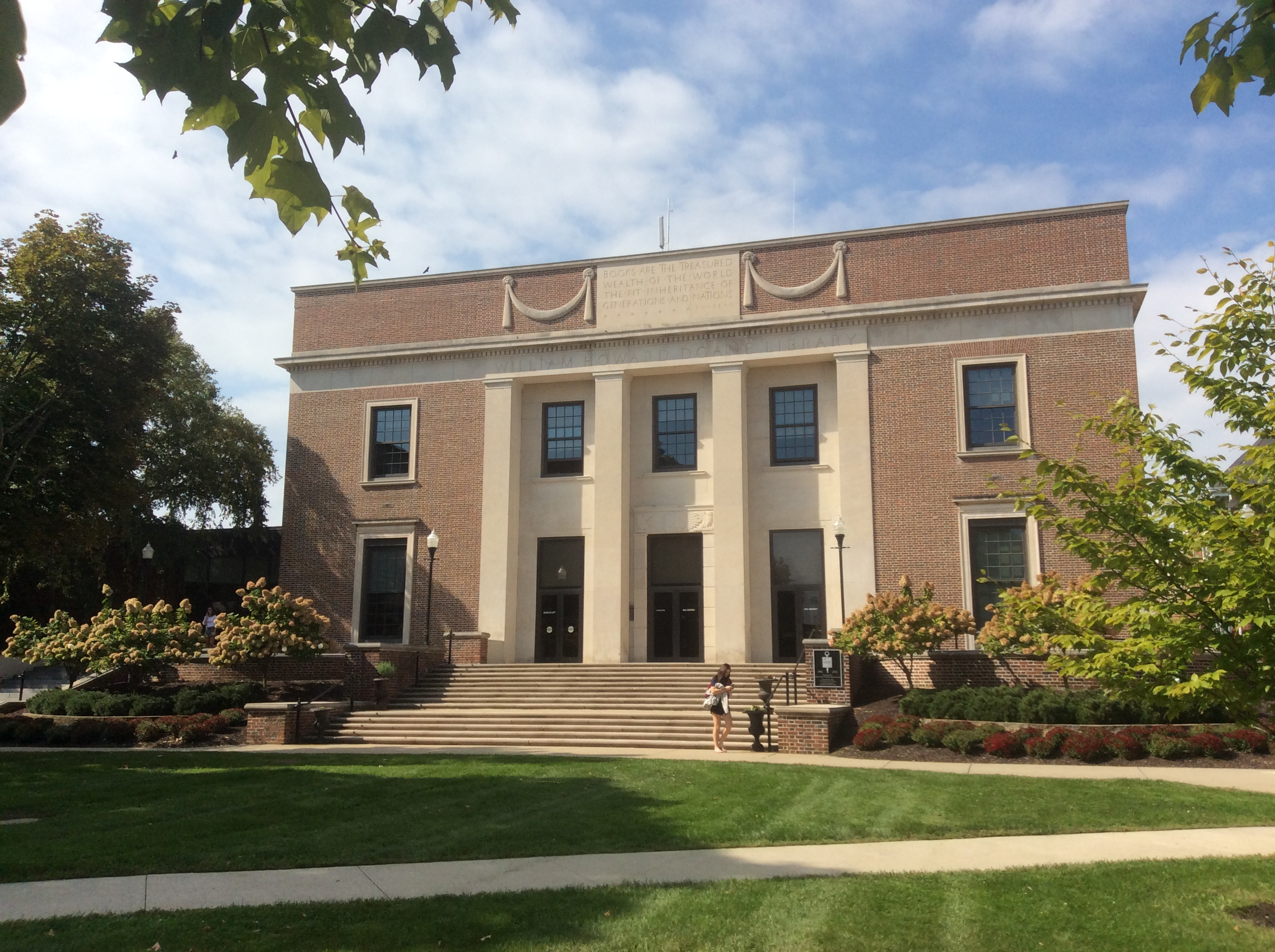
William Howard Doane Library (1937), gift of Doane's daughters in their father's memory

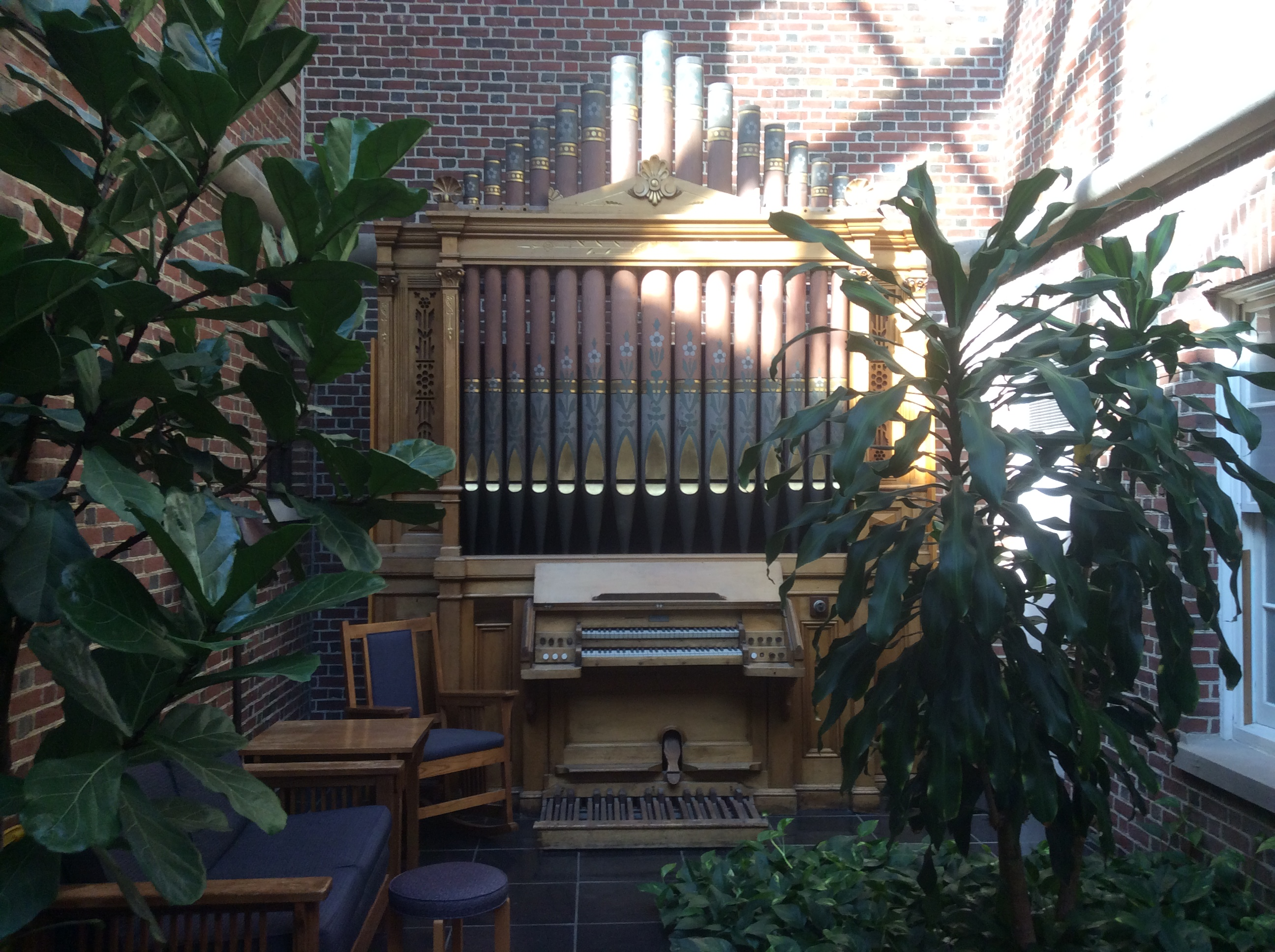
Pipe organ donated by William Howard Doane and located in the Library

During his lifetime and through bequests in his will, Doane's philanthropy included Denison University, Moody Bible Institute, Baptist churches, the YMCA, the Fanny Doane Home for Missionary Children in Granville and many other religious and civic organizations. After Doane's death, his wife and daughters continued the philanthropic work. His daughter Marguerite was a co-founder in 1927 of the Association of Baptists for World Evangelism. Her generous financial donations supported the organization through its early years.

== Later years ==
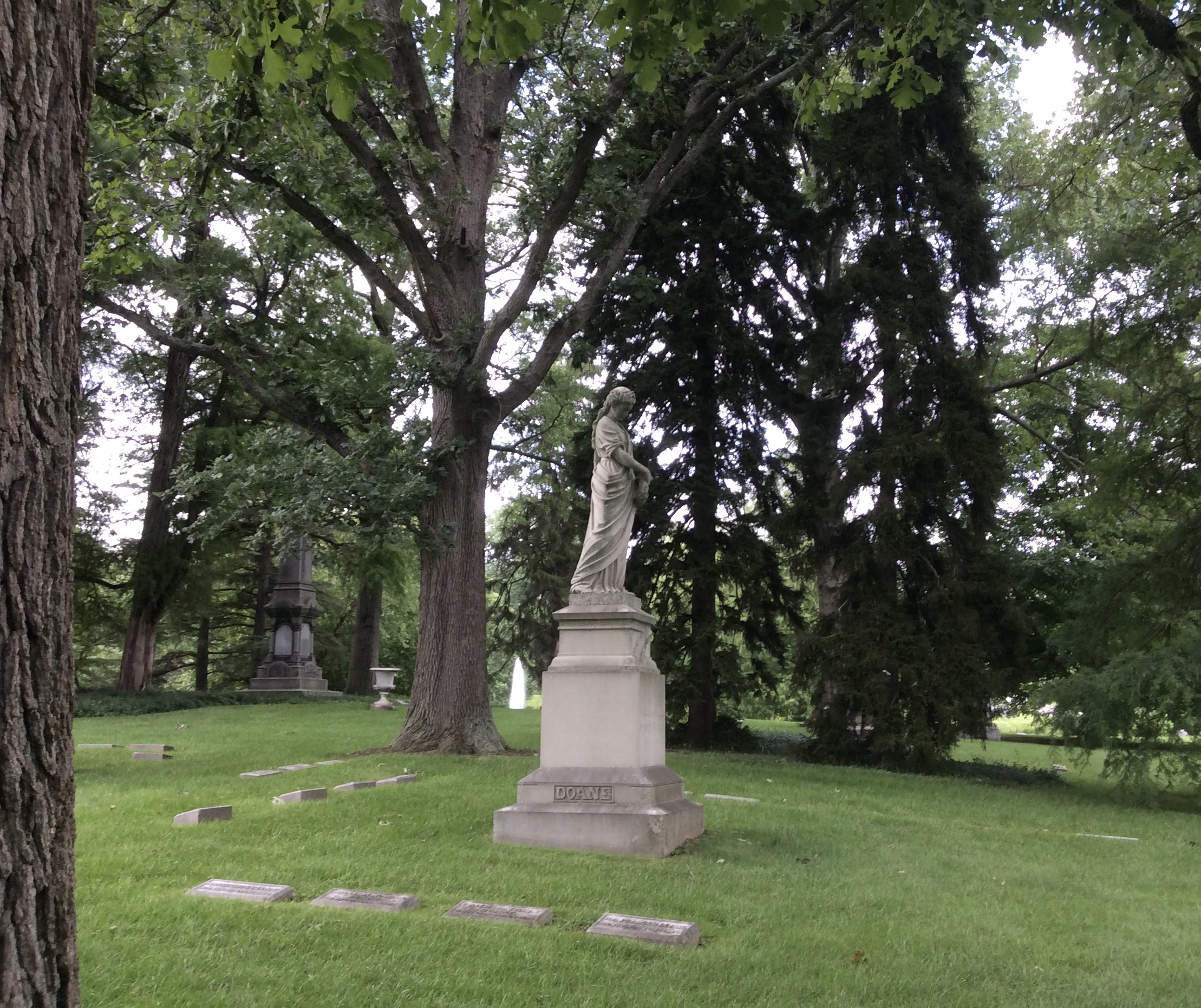
Doane family plot at Spring Grove Cemetery

After retirement from his business interests, Doane remained productive with music composition, choral direction, church work and philanthropy. With his wife and daughters he spent two years traveling in Europe. In 1894 Doane purchased 'Echo Lodge' in Watch Hill, Rhode Island (3 Aquidneck Avenue) as a seasonal seaside residence. Echo Lodge was located less than thirty miles from Preston, Connecticut, the childhood home of both Doane and his wife.

Doane died in South Orange, New Jersey on December 24, 1915. Along with other family members, he is buried in Spring Grove Cemetery in Cincinnati.

See also Weekapaug Inn, 25 Spray Rock Rd. Westerly, RI Doane, Ralph Harrington

== Legacy ==
In 1875 Doane was awarded a Doctorate of Music degree from Denison University. He became a major benefactor of the university, where two buildings continue to memorialize his philanthropy. The Doane Administration Building, built in 1894, serves as the offices for the President, Provost and Registrar. William Howard Doane Library, constructed in 1937, is the main campus library, and funded by Doane's daughters in his memory.

Doane's support for the evangelically oriented Moody Bible Institute is memorialized in the Doane Memorial Music Building. The building continues to house the Music Department's faculty, classrooms and student practice space. The J. A. Fay & Company's woodworking machinery quality was significantly improved by Doane's innovations and inventions. The company won numerous accolades around the world, including at the Paris Exposition of 1889, where it was awarded the Grand Prix. At the Exposition, Doane was honored as a Chevalier of the Legion of Honor.

William Howard Doane demonstrated a remarkable range of talents and achievement throughout his lifetime. His musical gifts included performance abilities with several instruments, hymn and cantata composition and choral direction. As a young man, he showed astute business and financial skills which propelled him to the presidency of an important manufacturing company by the age of thirty-four. A capacity for innovation and invention contributed to his company's success and advancements in the industry. His devotion to his Christian faith, local Baptist church and its broader denominational interests was widely recognized. Doane's philanthropy, across civic, educational and religious institutions, reflected a generous spirit committed to the common good.
