= Sankey =

Sankey, also spelled Sanchi, Zanchi may refer to:

People:

- Bishop Sankey (b 1992), American football running back
- Ben Sankey (b 1976), American football quarterback
- Ben Sankey (1907–2001), American baseball player
- Clarence Sankey (1913–1996), Australian cricketer
- David Sankey, Pennsylvanian state senator
- Derek Sankey (b 1948), Canadian basketball player
- Herbert Stuart Sankey (1854–1940), British barrister and politician
- Ira D. Sankey (1840–1908), American gospel singer and composer
- Jay Sankey, Canadian magician
- Jerome Sankey, English Civil War soldier and politician
- John Sankey, 1st Viscount Sankey (1866–1948), British politician
- John Sankey, Australian heavy metal drummer
- Joseph Sankey (b 1826), founder of Joseph Sankey & Sons Ltd. later part of GKN.
- Matthew Henry Phineas Riall Sankey (1853–1926), Irish engineer and creator of the Sankey diagram
- Maurie Sankey (1940–1965), Australian rules football player
- Philip Sankey (1830–1909), English clergyman and cricketer
- Richard Hieram Sankey (1829–1908), Irish engineer and major general in British India
- Sara Sankey (born 1967), English badminton player
- Stuart Sankey (1927–2000), American double bass player and teacher
- Tom Sankey (1891–1974), English footballer
- Tom Sankey (d 2010), American folk singer
- Tommy Sankey (b 1980), Republican member of the Pennsylvania House of Representatives.
- Verne Sankey (1890–1934), American Depression-era outlaw
- William Sankey (1822–1892), British army officer

Places:

- Great Sankey, Warrington, England
- Sankey Canal, Lancashire, England
- Sankey railway station, Warrington, England
- Sankey Tank, a man-made lake in Bangalore, India

Other uses:

- Sankey brick, a brick made in Pittsburgh, Pennsylvania
- Sankey diagram, depicting extensive flows in their correct proportions
- Sankey Viaduct, a railway viaduct at St Helens, Merseyside, England
- GKN Sankey F.C., an English football club previously known as Sankeys of Wellington
- Sankeys (nightclub), a nightclub in Manchester
- The standard coupler for commercial beer kegs

== See also ==
- Sankey diagram, which summarises all the energy transfers taking place in a process
