= Gwahoddiad =

1872 Welsh-language hymn

- by Lewis Hartsough
- English: I Hear Thy Welcome Voice
- Genre: Hymn
- Written: 1872
- Based on: John 10:27
- Meter: 6.6.8.6 with refrain

"Gwahoddiad" is a Welsh hymn of American origin.

"Gwahoddiad" (Welsh for 'invitation'), also known as Arglwydd Dyma Fi and by its first line Mi glywaf dyner lais, was originally the English-language gospel song "I Am Coming, Lord", the first line of which is I hear thy welcome voice. The English words and the tune were written in 1872 by the American Methodist minister and gospel songwriter Lewis Hartsough (1828–1919) during a revival meeting at Epworth, Iowa, where Hartsough was minister. Hartsough was musical editor of The Revivalist, a collection of hymns which had begun in 1868 and continued through 11 editions. The English words with Hartsough's tune first appeared in the 1872 edition.

The tune is in 3/4 time, with fermatas at the option of the songleader. The metrical pattern is 6686 with refrain 5576. The rhyme scheme is ABCB; the second and fourth lines rhyme, whether in the verse or in the refrain.

The melody of Gwahoddiad

In 1906 the American gospel singer and composer Ira D. Sankey wrote:

The words and music of this beautiful hymn were first published in a monthly entitled Guide to Holiness, a copy of which was sent to me in England. I immediately adopted it, and had it published in Sacred Songs and Solos. It proved to be one of the most helpful of the revival hymns, and was often used as an invitation hymn in England and America.

The Welsh version Gwahoddiad was translated by Calvinistic Methodist minister and musician Ieuan Gwyllt (literally John of the Wild, bardic name of John Roberts) (1822–1877). It has become so well known in Wales that, despite its American origin, many people believe it to be an indigenously Welsh hymn.

"I Am Coming, Lord" is an invitation song, typically sung at the end of a sermon in evangelistic meetings. The tune is usually called WELCOME VOICE in American hymnals and may be labeled CALVARY in British hymnals. During World War I Hartsough expressed gratification not only for having heard the song in various languages but also for having learned of its popularity with soldiers in the trenches of Europe.

Consider now the lyrics, with the Welsh version printed first.

== Welsh words ==
"Gwahoddiad"

The Roberts (Ieuan Gwyllt) translation had six verses originally, but the four verses below are the ones which are sung by now.

Mi glywaf dyner lais,
Yn galw arnaf fi,
I ddod a golchi 'meiau gyd,
Yn afon Calfari.

Byrdwn
Arglwydd, dyma fi
Ar dy alwad di,
Golch fi'n burlan yn y gwaed
A gaed ar Galfari.

Yr Iesu sy'n fy ngwadd,
I dderbyn gyda'i saint,
Ffydd, gobaith, cariad pur a hedd,
A phob rhyw nefol fraint.

Yr Iesu sy'n cryfhau,
O'm mewn Ei waith trwy ras;
Mae'n rhoddi nerth i'm henaid gwan,
I faeddu 'mhechod cas.

Gogoniant byth am drefn,
Y cymod a'r glanhad;
Derbyniaf Iesu fel yr wyf,
A chanaf am y gwaed.

== Original English words ==
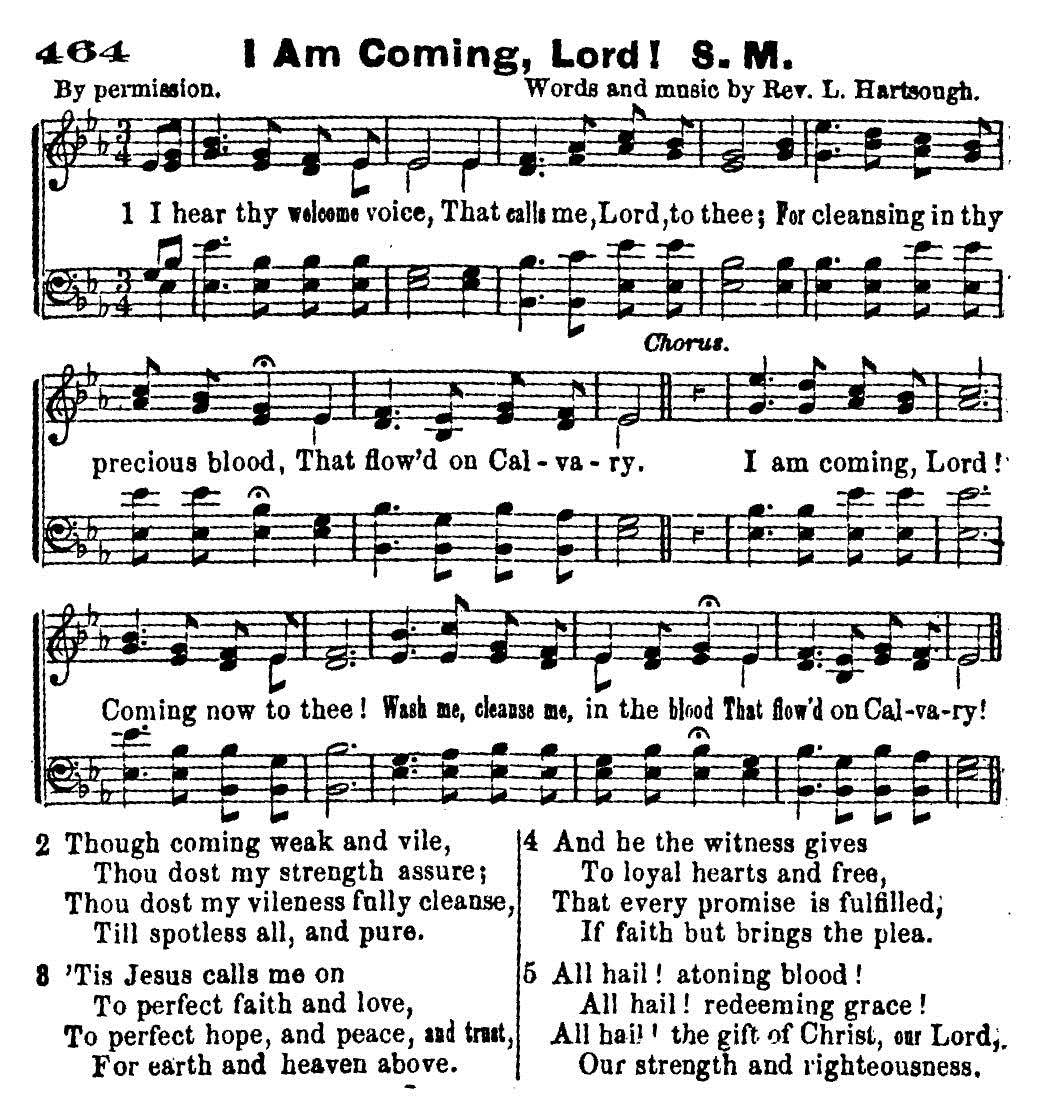
Original publication of Lewis Hartsough's "I Am Coming, Lord!" (first line "I hear Thy welcome voice") from the 1872 edition of the Revivalist edited by Hartsough & Joseph Hillman and published by Hillman in Troy, New York. This English-language American gospel song became phenomenally popular in Wales as GWAHODDIAD (Welsh for "invitation").

"I Am Coming, Lord!" as it appeared in the Revivalist (1872, p. 231, No. 464):

I hear thy welcome voice,
That calls me, Lord, to thee;
For cleansing in thy precious blood,
That flow'd on Calvary.

Chorus
I am coming, Lord!
Coming now to Thee!
Wash me, cleanse me, in the blood
That flow'd on Calvary!

Though coming weak and vile,
Thou dost my strength assure;
Though dost my vileness fully cleanse,
Till spotless all, and pure.

'Tis Jesus calls me on
To perfect faith and love,
To perfect hope, and peace, and trust,
For earth and heaven above.

And he the witness gives
To loyal hearts and free,
That every promise is fulfilled,
If faith but brings the plea.

All hail! atoning blood!
All hail! redeeming grace!
All hail! the gift of Christ, our Lord,
Our strength and righteousness.

The theology of the fourth verse from Hartsough's original has attracted some clarification from editors. The Calvinist Roberts (Ieuan Gwyllt) in the Welsh version simply massaged the concerns away via the translation. English-language editors who are unhappy with the theology have sometimes gone the way of B. B. McKinney in simply eliminating the verse or Elmer Leon Jorgenson in revising it as follows:

And He assurance gives
To loyal hearts and true,
That ev'ry promise is fulfilled,
To those who hear and do.

American hymn editor William Jensen Reynolds asserted in 1976, as he had done earlier, in 1964, another verse, between the third and fourth verses above:

'Tis Jesus who confirms
The blessed work within,
By adding grace to welcomed grace,
Where reigned the power of sin.
But that verse is included in the 1875 edition of Sankey's Sacred Songs and Solos.

== Notable recordings ==
- Morriston Orpheus Choir, on their 1994 album 60 Years of Song: EMI Records TCPR 133.
- Cerys Matthews, on her 2003 album Cockahoop: Blanco y Negro Records 2564-60306-2
- Only Men Aloud!, on their 2009 album Band of Brothers
- Only Boys Aloud, on their 2012 self-titled debut album: Relentless Records
- Treorchy Male Choir (1973) The Very Best of Welsh Choirs: 16 Fabulous Tracks, EMI Records: EMC 3099
- Stonehouse Male Voice Choir, on their 1995 album "Wee Stone House"
