= List of hymns composed by Ira D. Sankey =

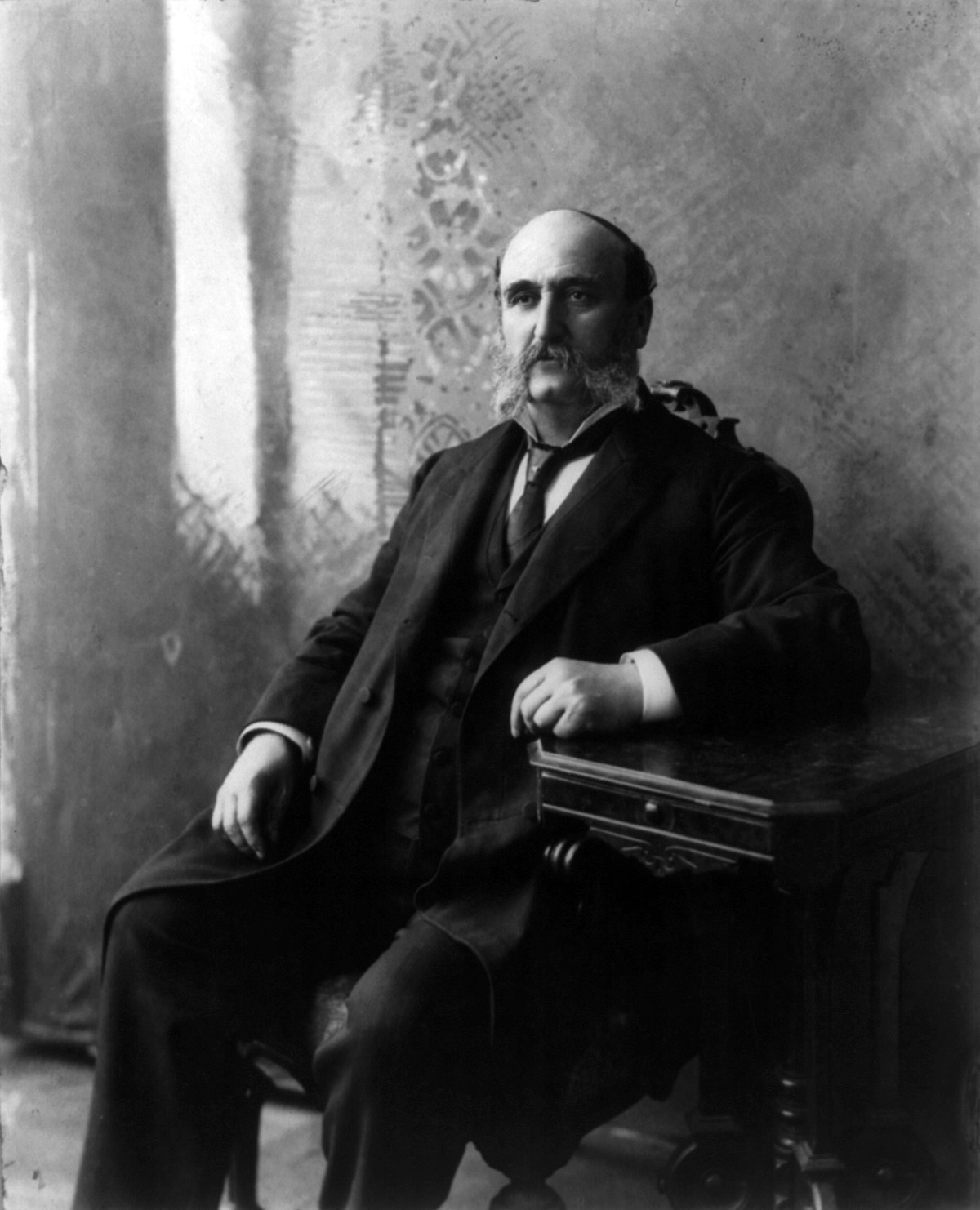
Ira D. Sankey

During the last three decades of the 19th century, Ira D. Sankey partnered Dwight Moody in a series of religious revivalist campaigns, mainly in North America and Europe. Moody preached, Sankey sang; as part of his musical ministry, Sankey collected hymns and songs, and in 1873 published in England the original edition of Sacred Songs and Solos, a short collection of 24 pages containing some of the favourite hymns that Sankey had introduced during the first Moody and Sankey evangelistic tour of Britain, in 1873–1875. Over the following years new, expanded editions of Sacred Songs were produced, containing many standard hymns as well as revivalist songs, the final edition from the 1900s containing 1,200 pieces. Sankey wrote the words for very few of these, but he composed and/or arranged new tunes for many of the hymns in the collection, particular for those written by Fanny Crosby. The following lists contains all the hymns composed by Sankey that are found in the "1200" edition of Sacred Songs and Solos. Many of these hymns are also found in the six-volume collection, Gospel Hymns and Sacred Songs, which Sankey edited with Philip Bliss and others, which was published in the United States between 1876 and 1891.

== Table of hymns ==
Hymn No.	Hymn title	First line	Text by (Note: An asterisk against the name indicates that this is a pseudonym for Fanny J. Crosby.)	Notes
8		Grace! 'tis a charming sound	P. Doddridge and A.M. Toplady	
35	Room for Thee	Thou didst leave Thy throne and thy Kingly crown	E.S. Elliott	
39	Tell the Glad Story Again!	Tell the glad story of Jesus	Julia Sterling*	
43		Tell me the story of Jesus	F.J. Crosby	
48		Jesus knows thy sorrow	W.O. Cushing	
49	The Love of Jesus	What a blessed hope is mine	Robert Bruce*	
54	Song of Immanuel	Come, sing the sweet song of the ages	Mrs R.N. Turner	
62	Seeking for the Lost	He is seeking for the lost	Rebecca R. Springer	
71		Oh, precious words that Jesus said	F.J. Crosby	
76		O love that passeth knowledge	Lyman G Cuyler*	
83		Blessed Redeemer, full of compassion	F.J. Crosby	
96		Oh, wondrous Name by prophets heard	Julia Sterling*	
97	The Ninety and Nine	There were ninety and nine that safely lay	Elizabeth C. Clephane	
104	The Lily of the Valley	I've found a friend in Jesus	C.W. Fry	Tune from unknown source arranged by Sankey
114	Room at the Cross	Look away to the cross of the Crucified One	F.J. Crosby	
125	The Cleansing Fountain	Behold a fountain deep and wide	Ira D. Sankey	
128	Substitution	O Christ, what burdens bow'd thy head	Mrs A.R. Cousin	
139	The Cross of Jesus	Beneath the cross of Jesus	Elizabeth C. Clephane	
159	What a Gathering!	On that bright and golden morning when the Son of Man shall come	F.J. Crosby	
164	The King is Coming	Rejoice! Rejoice! Our King is coming	Rian A. Dykes*	
170	Waiting for Thy Coming	We are waiting, blessed Saviour	F.J. Crosby	
172		He is coming, the Man of Sorrows	Alice Monteith*	
174	When the King Shall Come	Oh, the weary night is waning	F.J. Crosby	
186	Coming	O watchman on the mountain height	W.O. Cushing	
192		Holy Spirit, lead us now	John H. Yates	
195		Come, Holy Spirit, like a dove descending	Robert Bruce*	
200		Descend, O Flame of sacred fire	F.J. Crosby	
206		We praise thee, we bless Thee, our Saviour Divine.	F.J. Crosby	Arranged by Sankey from a tune by Thomas Koschat (1845–1914)
210		Glory ever be to Jesus	Ira D. Sankey	
211	Redeemed!	Redeem'd from death, redeem'd from sin	S.F. Smith	
220		Praise the Lord and worship Him, a song prepare	F.J. Crosby	
231		Hark, hark, my soul! angelic songs are swelling	F.W. Faber	Arranged by Sankey and Charles Crozat Converse
233		God is Love! His Word proclaims it	Julia Sterling*	
234		Let us sing again the praise of the Saviour	Lyman G. Cuyler*	
236	Come, and let us Worship	Come, oh come and let us worship	Lyman G. Cuyler*	
238	A Song of Praise	God of love and God of might	R.F. Gordon	
247		Oh serve the Lord with gladness	F.J. Crosby	
250	How Can I Keep from Singing?	My life flows on in endless song	R. Lowry	
257		Oh, tell me the story that never grows old	James M. Gray	
264	Oh Wonderful Word	Oh, wonderful, wonderful Word of the Lord	Julia Sterling*	
266	Thanks for the Bible	Thanks for Thy Word, O blessed Redeemer	F.J. Crosby	
293		Once more at rest, my peaceful thoughts are blending	F.J. Crosby	
294	An Evening Prayer	Stealing from the world away	Ray Palmer	
304	Simeon	Let us sing of the wonderful mercy of God	Lyman G. Cuyler*	
308		Oh welcome, hour of prayer	John H. Yates	
312		Once more, O Lord, we pray	W.O. Cushing	
315		For the tempted, Lord, we pray	Mrs M.H. Gates	
324	Bless This Hour of Prayer	Lord, we gather in Thy name	F.J. Crosby	
328		Hear us, O Saviour, while we pray	F.J. Crosby	
335	Why not Tonight?	Oh, do not let the Word depart	Miss E. Reed	
346		Not far, not far from the Kingdom		
348		Why waitest thou, O burdened soul	F.J. Crosby	
349		Come, oh come with thy broken heart	F.J. Crosby	
350	I Am Praying For You	I have a Saviour, he's pleading in glory	S. O'M. Clough	
353	The Story Must Be Told	Oh, the precious gospel story	F.J. Crosby	
361		Behold, behold the wondrous love	F.J. Crosby	
383	Whoever Will!	O wandering souls, why will you roam	Alice Monteith*	
387		Take the wings of the morning	Robert Lowry	
391		Call them in – the poor, the wretched	Anna Shipton	
394		Wilt thou not come, O soul oppressed	Ira D. Sankey	
395	The Harbour Bell	Our life is like a stormy sea	John H. Yates	
397		Look unto Me, and be ye saved!	W.P. MacKay	
402	Believe and Obey!	Press onward, press onward, and trusting the Lord	Julia Sterling*	
407		Come, thou weary, Jesus calls thee	S.C. Morgan	
413	Oh, What a Saviour!	Come to the Saviour, here His loving voice	Julia Sterling*	
419	Whosoever Calleth	Oh hear the joyful message	Julia Sterling*	
423	Come, Wanderer, Come	Why perish with cold and with hunger?	Mary A. Baker	
429		Yet there is room! The Lamb's bright hall of song	Horatius Bonar	Sankey records this as the first gospel song he composed (1874).
432	The Handwriting on the Wall	At the feast of Belshazzar and a thousand of his lords	Knowles Shaw	Sankey's arrangement of Shaw's original tune
436		Oh, give thy heart to Jesus	W.O. Cushing	
438		Look not behind thee; O sinner, beware!	F.J. Crosby	
444	The Father's House	O wanderer, come to the Father's home!	W.O. Cushing	
447	Welcome, Wanderer, Welcome!	In the land of strangers	Horatius Bonar	
449	Tenderly Pleading	Turn thee, O lost one, careworn and weary	F.J. Crosby	
459	Believe ye that He is Able?	O souls in darkness groping	Julia H. Johnson	
463	The Prodigal's Return	Afflictions, tho' they seem severe	John Newton	Tune from unknown source, arranged by Sankey
465	Room for Jesus	Hast thou no room within thy heart	John H. Yates	
467		I come, O blessed Lord	Ellen K. Bradford	
468		Jesus, I will trust Thee	Mary J. Wilson	
476	Take Me as I Am	Jesus my Lord, to Thee I cry	Eliza H. Hamilton	
481	I am Coming	Lone and weary, sad and dreary	Allie Starbright	
492		Jesus Christ is passing by	J. Denham Smith	
495	O Blessed Lord, I Come	O Jesus, Saviour, here my call	F.J. Crosby	
507		Onward, upward, homeward	Albert Midlane	
517		God will take care of you	F.J. Crosby	
519	Hiding in Thee	Oh, safe to the Rock that is higher than I	W.O. Cushing	
527	My Hiding Place	Thou art, O Lord, my Hiding Place	R. Hutchinson	
531		In the shadow of the Rock	Ray Palmer	
532		Take Thou my hand and lead me	Julia Sterling*	
535	He Will Safely Hide Me	In the Secret of His presence He will hide me	F.J. Crosby	
539	A Shelter in the Time of Storm	The Lord's our Rock, in Him we'll hide	V.J.C.	
541	Under His Wings	Under His wings I am safely abiding	W.O. Cushing	
544	Where my Saviour Leads	Where my Saviour's hand is guiding	F.J. Crosby	Tune of unknown origin arranged by Sankey
546	The Shadow of the Rock	Lead to the shadow of the Rock of Refuge	F.J. Crosby	
551		Firm as a Rock that is in the mighty ocean	F.J. Crosby	
559		The Lord is my Refuge, my Strength and Shield	F.J. Crosby	
579	Near to Thee	Thou whose hand thus far has led me	Julia Sterling*	
620		It passeth knowledge, that dear love of Thine	Mary Shekelton	
631	Let us Walk in the Light	There is a Light, a blessed Light	F.J. Crosby	Tune of unknown origin arranged by Sankey
636		Help me, O Lord, the God of my salvation	F.J. Crosby	
651	Precious Thoughts	To the cross of Christ I cling	Mary Tilden*	
670		Onward, soldiers, onward today!	F.J. Crosby	
672	A Soldier of the Cross	Am I a soldier of the Cross	Isaac Watts	
677	The Ship of Temperance	Take courage, temperance workers	John G. Whittier	
678	A Song for Water Bright	A song, a song for water bright	G. Cooper	
682	Faith is the Victory	Encamped along the hills of light	John H. Yates	
686		Be ye strong in the Lord	E. Nathan	
693	Onward, Upward	Onward, upward, Christian soldier	F.J. Crosby	
699		O brother, life's journey beginning	Ira D. Sankey	
702	Out of Darkness into Light	Long in darkness we have waited	W.O. Lattimore	
709	Able to Deliver	O troubled heart, be thou not afraid	F.J. Crosby	
712		O child of God, wait patiently	Alice Monteith*	
716	Thy Saviour Knows Them All	O troubled heart, there is a balm	F.J. Crosby	
720	Paul and Silas	Night has fallen on the city	P.P. Bliss	
722	The Many Mansions	How oft our souls are lifted up	Charles Bruce*	
724		How dear to my heart, when the pathway is lonely	F.J. Crosby	Tune of unknown origin arranged by Sankey
725	All, All is Well	Where'er my Father's hand may guide me	W. Robert Lindsay*	
732	Rest in the Lord	Rest in the Lord, O weary, heavy-laden	F.J. Crosby	
739	My Great Physician	Thou art my great Physician	F.J. Crosby	
756	The Master's Call	Behold, the Master now is calling	Julia Sterling*	
758	Gather the Golden Grain	Leave not for tomorrow the work of today	F.J. Crosby	
760		Is thy cruse of comfort failing?	Mrs E.R. Charles (arr.)	
766	Gather in the Sheaves	In the early morning/Verdant fields adorning	Robert Bruce*	
771		Cast thy bread upon the waters	Anonymous	
775	They that be Wise	Oh list to the voice of the Prophet of old	F.J. Crosby	
782		Who will man the life-boat?	C.E. Breck (arr.)	
792		Who is on the Lord's side?	Frances R. Havergal	
796	Where the Saviour leads	If in the valley where the bright waters flow	F.J. Crosby	
798	Only Remembered	Fading away like the stars of the morning	Horatius Bonar	
802		While the days are going by	George Cooper	
808	There is joy in the Saviour	There is joy in the service of Jesus our Lord	Lyman G. Cuyler*	
816	Speak to them gently	Speak gently, speak gently, oh grieve not again	F.J. Crosby	
818		Not now, my child! A little more rough tossing	Mrs Pennefather	
822	Wells of Salvation	With joy I draw from out God's well	Phoebe A. Holder	
828		Trav'lling to the better land	Ira D. Sankey (arr.)	
830		Light after darkness, gain after loss	Francis R. Havergal	
834	Press On	Press on, press on, O pilgrim	F.J. Crosby	
836	Trusting Jesus	Simply trusting every day	E. Page	
838		Children of the heavenly King	J. Cennick	Arranged by Sankey from a tune by T.C. O'Kane
839	Only to Know	Only to know that the path I tread	Allie Starbright	
846	I Know he is Mine	A long time I wander'd in darkness and sin	P.P. Bliss	
850		I came a wanderer and alone	Julia Sterling*	
851		We have a firm foundation	Lyman G. Cuyler*	
860	Thy Hand Upholdeth Me	I know Thy hand upholdeth me	F.J. Crosby	
864	I am Redeemed	I am redeemed, oh, praise the Lord	Julia Sterling*	
876		It came to me one precious day	E.S. Ufford	
886	Joy in Sorrow	I've found a joy in sorrow	J. Crewdson	
899	He has Taken my Sins Away	I will praise the Lord with heart and voice	Lyman G. Cuyler*	
903	Full Assurance	Drawing near with full assurance	D.W. Whittle	
910	A Little While	Oh for the peace that floweth as a river	J. Crewdson	
912	Gathered Home	Shall we all meet at home in the morning?	Ira D. Sankey (arr.)	
927		After the darkest hour	M.R. Tilden*	
928	When the Shadows Flee Away	We are marching to a city	Julia Sterling*	
930		Far away beyond the shadows	Julia Sterling*	
933		Just beyond the silent river	Ira D. Sankey	
945	When the Mists have Rolled Away	When the mists have rolled in splendour	Annie Herbert	
951		Still, still with Thee, when purple morning breaketh	Harriet B. Stowe	
958	A Song of Heaven and Homeland	Sometimes I hear strange music	E.E. Rexford	
963	Where God and the Angels are	There may be stormy days	L.W. Mansfield	
971	The Homeland Shore	Far, far beyond the storms that gather	F.J. Crosby	Arranged by Sankey from a tune by S.C. Foster
974	Never Say Good-bye	Oh, blessed home where those who meet	F.J. Crosby	
977	How Long?	The weary hours like shadows come and go	Sarah Doudney	
979	The Everlasting Hills	Oh, the music rolling onward	F.J. Crosby	
985		Beyond the sea, life's boundless sea	W.O. Cushing	
989		There is a Paradise of rest	W.R. Lindsay*	
993	Do They Know?	In the land where the bright ones are gathered	W.O. Cushing	
996	Come up Higher	Climbing up the steepsa of glory	W.O. Cushing	
997		Oh world of joy untold	F.J. Crosby	
1002		Songs of gladness – never sadness	Horatius Bonar	
1018		O Homeland! O Homeland!	Lucy Rider Meyer	
1024		Ten thousand times ten thousand	Dean Alford	
1025		Out of the shadow-land, into the sunshine	Ira D. Sankey	
1026		There'll be no dark valley when Jesus comes	W.O. Cushing	
1028	The Resurrection Morn	On the Resurrection morning	Sabine Baring-Gould	
1029		Only waiting till the shadows	Mrs Frances L. Mack	
1034		Grand in the song of the Easter morn	Anna D. Walker	
1038	Through the Valley of the Shadow	I must walk through the valley of the shadow	Ira D. Sankey	
1041	The Christian's "Good-night"	Sleep on, beloved, sleep, and take thy rest	Sarah Doudney	
1043	Eternity!	Oh, the clanging bells of time!	Mrs E.H. Gates	
1058	The Bountiful Harvest	We praise Thee O Lord, for the bountiful harvest	F.J. Crosby	
1073	Tell it Out!	Tell it out among the nations that the Lord is King	Frances R. Havergal	Arranged by Sankey from a tune by F.R. Havergal
1081	The Lord is King!	Hear the everlasting song	Julia Sterling*	
1083	Thou shalt Reign!	Great Jehovah, mighty Lord	F.J. Crosby	
1085	Send the Gospel Light	Send the Light, oh, send it quickly	F.J. Crosby	
1091	Words of Cheer	We come today from near and far	Allen A. Judson*	
1097		Army of Endeavour, hear the trumpet call	Ira D. Sankey	
1098	The Christian Endeavour Army	On, march on, O Army of Endeav'rers!	F.J. Crosby	
1099		Walking in the sunshine, beautiful and bright	W.R. Lindsay*	
1100	Endeavouer's Marching Song	Christian soldiers all, hear our Leader's call	F.J. Crosby	
1103		Onward, O Junior Endeav'rers	F.J. Crosby	
1106		Oh, help me tell the story	Edward Shiras	
1108	Our Christian Band	With cheerful songs and hymns of praise	Lyman G. Cuyler*	
1112	Work and Pray	Let us work and pray together	Julia Sterling*	
1118	This is our Endeavour	Lonely hearts to comfort, weary lives to cheer	F.J. Crosby	
1123		Our Junior Band is marching on	F.J. Crosby	
1157		Hark! hark! the song from youthful voices breaking	Julia Sterling*	
1159	We Will Follow Thee	Saviour, where thou leadeth	F.J. Crosby	
1188		If I were a voice, a persuasive voice	Charles Mackay	

== Notes and references ==
=== Sources ===
- McNeill, William K., ed. (2010). Encyclopedia of American Gospel Music. New York and London: Routledge. ISBN 978-0-415-87569-1.
- Sankey, Ira D. (1906). My Life and Sacred Songs. London: Hodder and Stoughton.
- Sankey, Ira D., ed. (1900). Sacred Songs & Solos (revised and enlarged, 1200 pieces with music). London: Morgan and Scott. OCLC 23175485. (year of publication approximate) unpaginated
- Golden Bells: Hymns for young people. London: Children's Special Service Mission. 1925. OCLC 221976236. (year of publication approximate) unpaginated
- Hymnary.org (an online database of hymns and hymnals hosted by Calvin College's Calvin Institute of Christian Worship and Christian Classics Ethereal Library)
