= Ieuan Gwyllt =

Welsh musician and minister

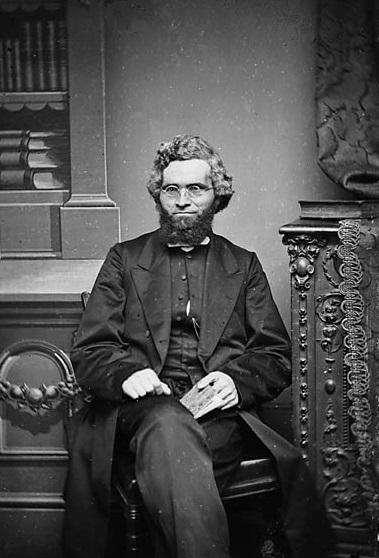
Ieuan Gwyllt, about 1875, by Welsh photographer John Thomas

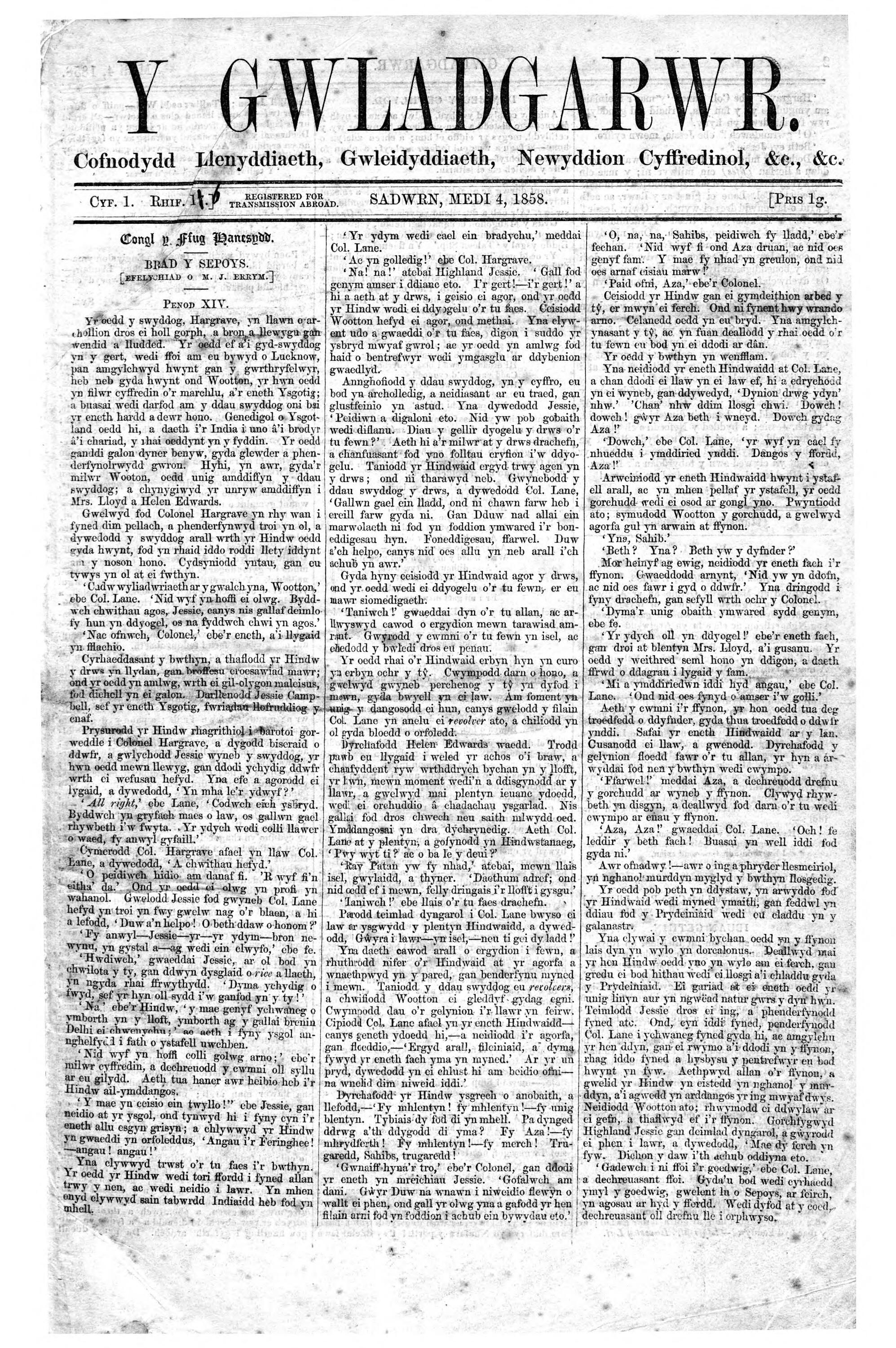
Front page of the earliest surviving copy of the Welsh newspaper Y Gwladgarwr: 4 September 1858

Ieuan Gwyllt was the bardic name of Welsh musician and minister John Roberts (22 December 1822 - 14 May 1877). His bardic name is derived from the pen name he used whilst writing poetry as a boy, Ieuan Gwyllt Gelltydd Melindwr (John of the Wild Woods near the Mill Tower). He was born at Tanrhiwfelen, a house just outside Aberystwyth, and died in Caernarfon on 14 May 1877. He was buried at Caeathro cemetery near Caernarfon.

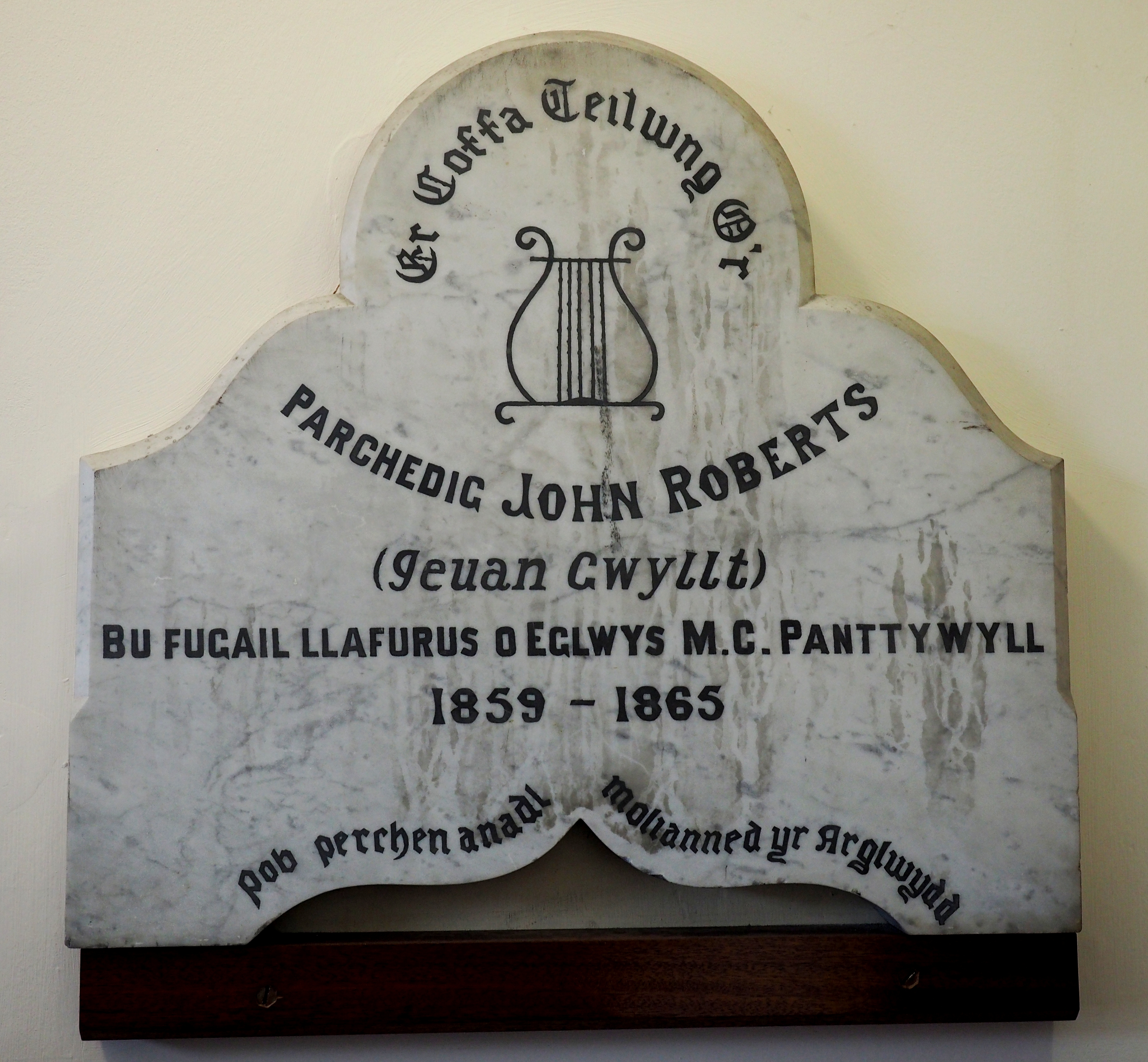
Memorial to Roberts, commemorating his ministry at Pant‑tywyll Calvinistic Methodist church, Merthyr Tydfil. Now in Canolfan Soar, Merthyr Tydfil.

== Biography ==
Roberts worked as a clerk to a company of dispensing chemists in Aberystwyth, but after two years started to teach at the Skinner Street School. After only a few months, however, he enrolled at the Borough Road Training College in London where he stayed for nine months. On his return to Aberystwyth in 1845 he opened a school. After only nine months there, he left to become clerk to a firm of solicitors where he stayed for nearly seven years. In 1852 he became assistant editor of Yr Amserau, a Welsh newspaper based in Liverpool.

On 15 June 1856 he preached his first sermon at Runcorn and in 1858 he moved to Aberdare to edit Y Gwladgarwr ("The Patriot"). The following year he was married to Jane Richards of Aberystwyth. In 1859 he was asked to become minister of Pant-tywyll Calvinistic Methodist church in Merthyr Tydfil and was ordained on 7 August 1861 at the Newcastle Emlyn Association.

Although he composed music from an early age, it was not until 1859 that he produced Llyfr Tonau Cynulleidfaol ("Book of Congregational Tunes"), a labour of some six years, with whose publication began a new era of Welsh congregational hymn singing. Roberts founded a number of regional musical festivals - the Gwent and Morgannwg in 1854, the Gŵyl Eryri in 1866, and the Gŵyl Ardudwy in 1868. In the 1870s he travelled widely throughout Wales, lecturing on congregational music.

From 1861 until 1865 he was the editor and publisher of the Welsh periodical Y Cerddor Cymreig and he remained its editor until 1873. In 1864 he produced a Tonic Sol-fa edition of his own Llyfr Tonau Cynulleidfaol and founded Cerddor y Tonic Solffa in 1869 of which he was editor until 1874. In 1865 he became minister of Capel Coch Calvinistic Methodist church in Llanberis, where he remained until his retirement in 1869 to Y Fron, Llanfaglan, near Caernarvon. In 1874 he issued Sŵn y Jiwbili an arrangement in Welsh of Moody and Sankey hymns and tunes.

Roberts was the translator of the Welsh hymns Mae d'eisiau, O mae d'eisiau (written in 1872 by Annie S. Hawks as "I Need Thee Every Hour") and of Gwahoddiad (written and composed in 1872 by Lewis Hartsough with the title "I Am Coming, Lord").
