= Telyn y Plant =

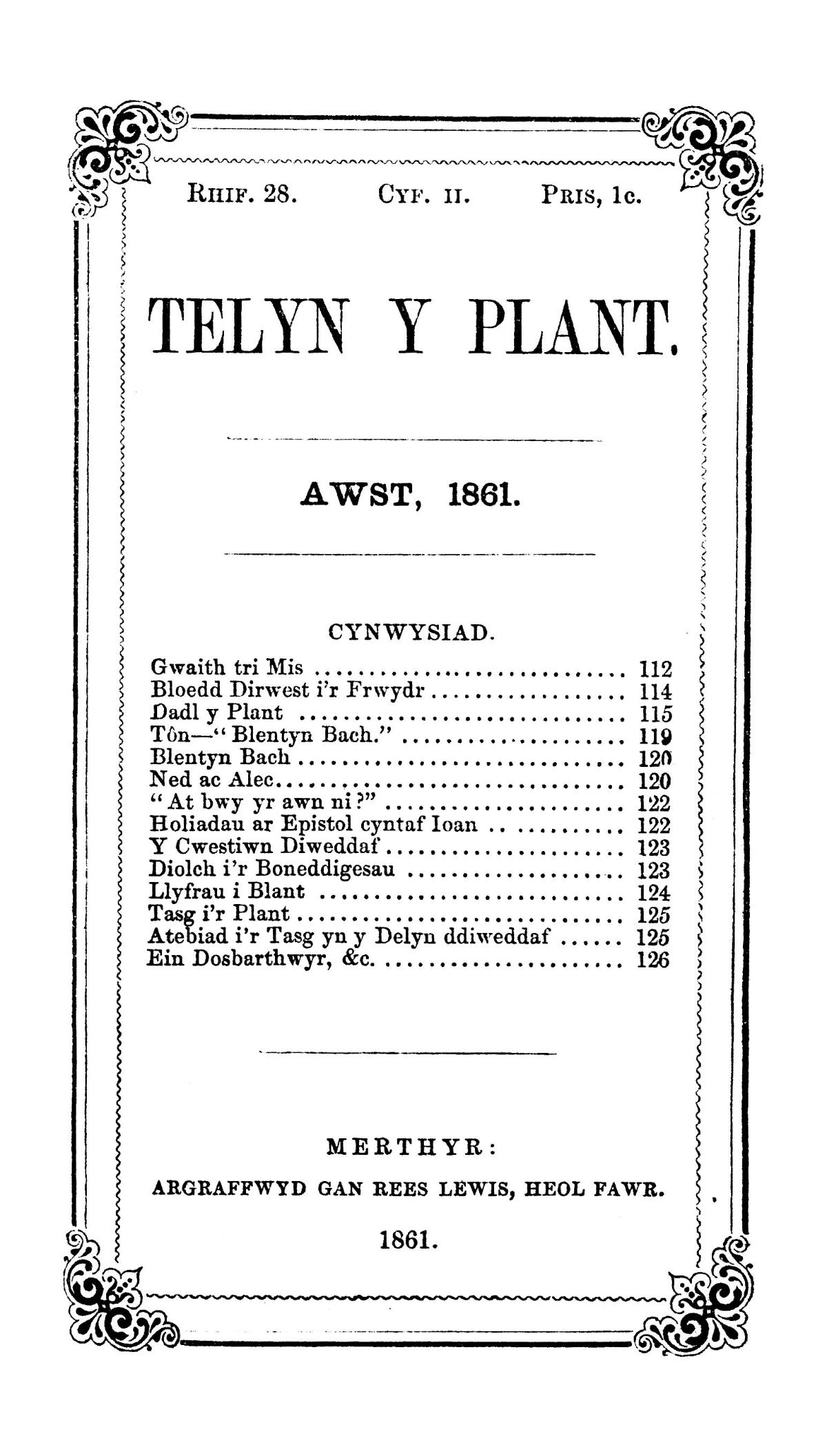
Telyn y Plant (Welsh Journal)

Telyn y Plant was a 19th-century Welsh language periodical. It was produced for Welsh-speaking young people involved with the anti alcohol charity Band of Hope, now known as Hope UK, by Methodist minister Thomas Levi (1825-1916), and musician John Roberts (Ieuan Gwyllt, 1822-1877), in 1859. It contained mainly articles on subjects such as temperance, religion, and the activities of the Band of Hope, along with music and poetry.
