= Blodau cerdd =

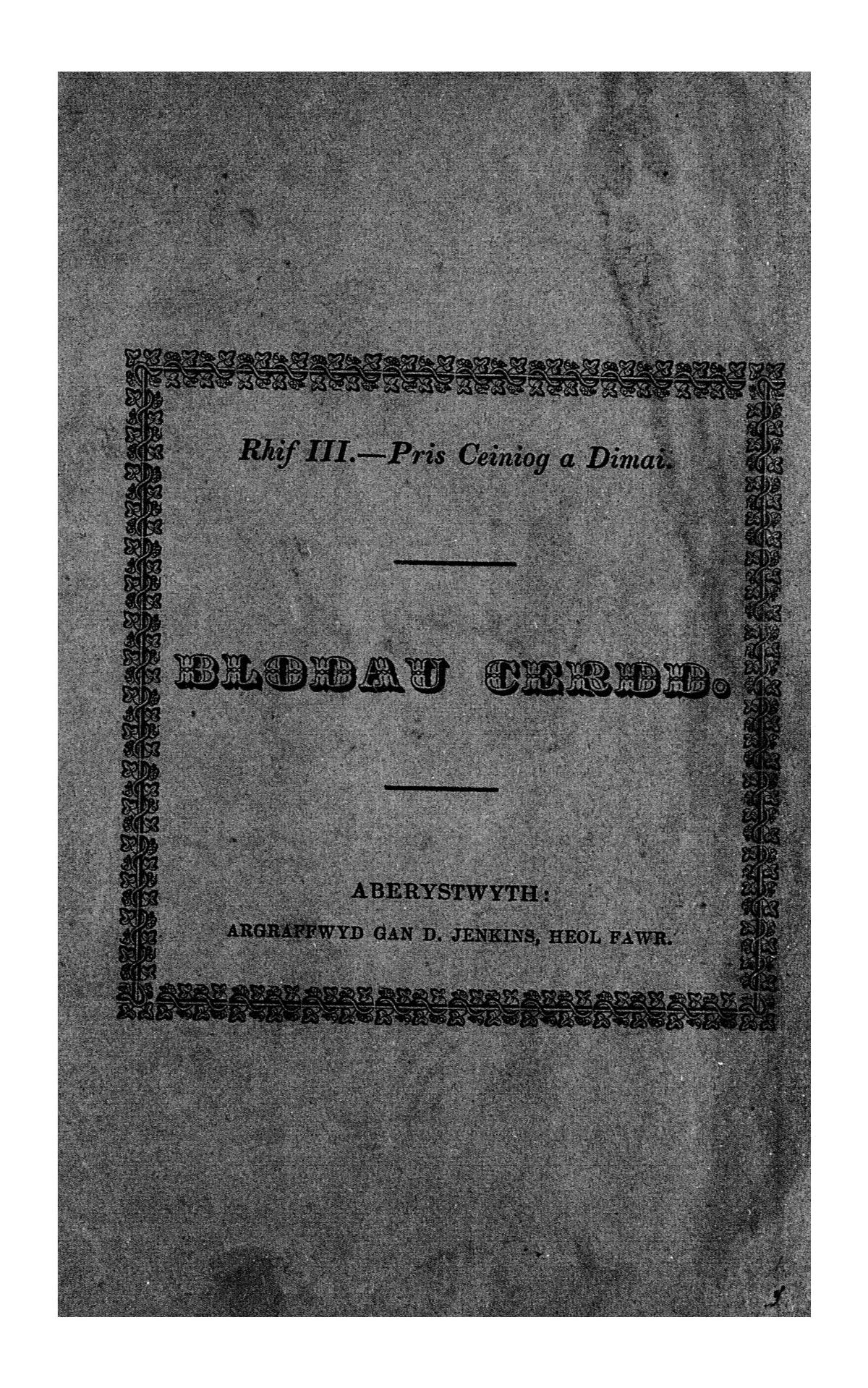
Blodau cerdd (Welsh Journal)

Blodau cerdd was a 19th-century monthly Welsh language periodical.

It was first produced in 1852 by Methodist minister and musician, John Roberts (Ieuan Gwyllt, 1822-1877). It contained music lessons and hymn tunes intended for use by Sunday Schools and young people .
