= Only Boys Aloud =

Welsh male choir formed in 2010

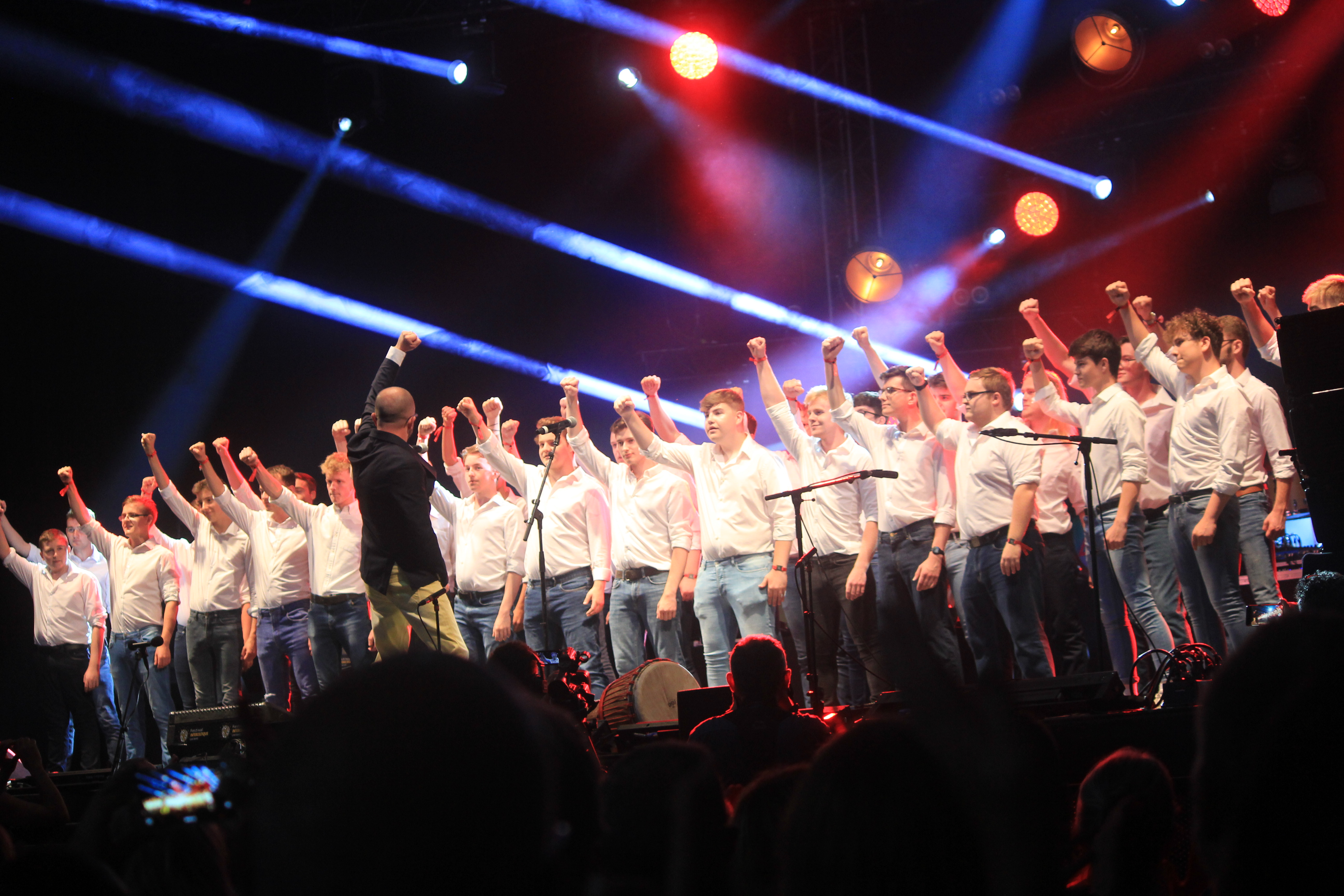

Background information
- Origin: Wales
- Genre: Choral music
- Occupation: Youth choir
- Years active: 2010–present
- Label: Relentless UK
- Members: Choral members
- Website: www.aloud.cymru/boys/

Only Boys Aloud is a Welsh boys' choir founded by choral director Tim Rhys-Evans. Only Boys Aloud finished third in the Britain's Got Talent competition in May 2012 and released their debut album in November 2012.

== History ==
Only Boys Aloud was founded in May 2010 by Tim Rhys-Evans. Rhys-Evans, who founded Only Men Aloud! in 2000, brought 144 boys onstage to sing with Only Men Aloud at the opening of the National Eisteddfod in Ebbw Vale in 2010. According to Rhys-Evans, he intended to use this one-time event to gauge the level of interest in a Welsh boys' choir. The event led to the formation of an organization, the Aloud Charity, which funds Only Boys Aloud. Rhys-Evans "'noticed choirs were getting older and older, which went hand in hand with a breakdown in the traditional sense of community in South Wales'", and he desired to "'inject some new blood into the Welsh tradition of choir singing'". According to Rhys-Evans, he also wanted to help boys in economically depressed areas of Wales: "'Choral singing is a stronghold of the Valleys and I wanted to use it as a way of getting teenage boys doing something positive'".

In December 2011, Only Boys Aloud joined forces with its father company, Only Men Aloud, to perform on the final night of Only Men Aloud's arena tour at the Motorpoint Arena Cardiff and also featured on their Christmas CD. They have been the subject of two TV documentaries and appeared on BBC's Songs of Praise. Only Boys Aloud have appeared at many events, including at the Millennium Stadium, Cardiff with Dame Shirley Bassey and Catherine Zeta-Jones in the "Ryder Cup Welcome to Wales" concert.

The choir gained publicity when they auditioned for the ITV talent show Britain's Got Talent. They performed "Calon Lân" in their audition, which was aired on the first audition episode on 24 March 2012. With support of all judges, they progressed to the semi-finals. In the semi-final, they performed "Gwahoddiad". After a split decision of the judges, the public vote sent them to the finals. In the final, on 12 May, they again performed "Calon Lân" and finished third in the competition. According to Wales Online, Only Boys Aloud "won over the nation when they took third place on ITV's Britain's Got Talent".

In August 2012, it was announced that Only Boys Aloud had signed a record deal with Relentless Records–Sony Music. The news was announced at the opening concert of the National Eisteddfod in the Vale of Glamorgan. The choir's self-titled debut album was released in November 2012. "Calon Lân" went into the number one position on the iTunes classical singles chart and the choir developed a list of TV and radio credits, including This Morning, Songs of Praise, Who Wants To Be A Millionaire: Christmas Special, All Star Christmas Presents, and Stepping Out with Katherine Jenkins.

In 2018, Only Boys Aloud released an album entitled A New Generation.

As of September 2019, the Aloud Charity sponsored 14 choirs throughout Wales. Only Boys Aloud choirs do not require auditions and do not charge fees to members.

In January 2020, Tim Rhys-Evans stepped down from his role with The Aloud Charity and Only Boys Aloud and was appointed Director of Music at the Royal Welsh College of Music and Drama.

Craig Yates took over the role of Creative Director in 2020, leading the organisation through the lockdown period and expanding the reach of the charity though work with boys, kids and girls. The Charity celebrated their 10th year anniversary by holding two celebration concerts in St David's Hall, Cardiff and Rhyl Pavilion.

Only Boys Aloud began working with schools in Oita and Kitakyushu in 2020 and in 2025, 12 members of Only Boys Aloud travelled to Japan for the first time so that the young people from both nations could meet in person. The tour included Welsh and Japanese song exchanges, performances in Oita, Kitakyushu, Hiroshima and Tokyo, and visits to important sites where the boys learned more about and experience the vibrant history and cultures of Japan.

In 2026, members of Only Boys Aloud travelled to The Netherlands for a concert tour. They performed in Ziest and in St. John's Cathedral in Den Bosch.
