= David Mahoney (conductor) =

British conductor and producer

- Born: David Joseph Mahoney; October 5, 1987 (age 38)
- Occupation(s): Conductor, producer, creative director
- Years active: 2009–present

David Joseph Mahoney (born 5 October 1987) is a British conductor, producer and creative director.

== Early life and Performance groups ==
Mahoney is a graduate of St Peter's College, Oxford and was a Choral Scholar at the university. He attended Marlborough College as a Music Scholar, where he was a contemporary of Jack Whitehall and Princess Eugenie.

He is the founder and musical director of The Novello Orchestra, who have performed with artists including Kerry Ellis, Ruthie Henshall, The von Trapps, Lee Mead, Matt Cardle, and American group Pink Martini.

He was a member of Classical Brit Award-winning group Only Men Aloud, performing at high-profile events including the London 2012 Olympics Opening Ceremony, BBC Strictly Come Dancing and the Royal Variety Performance.

Mahoney is the Principal Conductor of The Novello Orchestra and has appeared as a Guest Conductor with orchestras including the Royal Philharmonic Orchestra, Cape Town Philharmonic, RTE National Symphony Orchestra, Evergreen Symphony Orchestra, Taiwan Philharmonic, National Taiwan Symphony Orchestra, Flanders Philharmonic Orchestra, Manchester Concert Orchestra, Luxembourg Philharmonic Orchestra, Orchestra National de Lille, London Concert Orchestra, Hungarian Studio Orchestra and Orchestra Sinfonica di Milano.

== Productions ==
Mahoney is one of the world's leading conductors of Film with Live Orchestra and Disney's principal conductor in the UK, having appeared at major concert halls internationally with performances and tours including Marvel's Infinity Saga (UK Premiere), Beauty and the Beast, the Star Wars trilogy, Pixar in Concert, La La Land, Grease, Toy Story, The Muppet Christmas Carol (World Premiere), Joker (also acting as Music Supervisor), The Holiday (World Premiere and also acting as Music Supervisor), Spiderman: Into the Spiderverse (also acting as Music Supervisor), Black Panther (Asia Premiere), Encanto, The Jungle Book (UK Premiere), Avatar: The Last Airbender (World Premiere) and Disney's The Sound of Magic.

He regularly appears at UK Festivals and the Royal Albert Hall as conductor of the popular Ministry of Sound Classical, collaborating with artists such as trailblazer organist Anna Lapwood and Rag 'n' Bone Man. He regularly conducts renowned mezzo-soprano Katherine Jenkins, including her performance at BST Hyde Park, supporting Andrea Bocelli to an audience of 50,000, making it the largest outdoor classical concert of the century.

As a creative director and producer, his shows include Broadway to the Bay as part of the Wales Millennium Centre's 10th Anniversary celebrations, The Golden Age of Dance (starring Joanne Clifton and Anton du Beke), the Opening Concert of the 2016 National Eisteddfod, and Music Supervisor for the Roald Dahl Centenary Celebrations 'City of the Unexpected'.

Mahoney is patron of Performing Arts Academy Wales, the South Glamorgan Festival for Young Musicians, and is a regular columnist for Cardiff Life Magazine. He was a judge for the 2015 Cardiff Life Awards and has appeared twice in Wales Online's Sexiest Men in Wales Top 50, appearing at number 12 in 2011.

He was musical director and music supervisor for Tiger Bay the Musical, with performances in Artscape Theatre Cape Town and Wales Millennium Centre.

For television, Mahoney has worked as a producer for Jonathan and Charlotte (ITV1) and three episodes of Songs of Praise (BBC1), whilst development work includes projects involving Dame Shirley Bassey and Sir Tom Jones. In 2023, he served as Music Producer for the Emmy nominated and BAFTA winning BBC network drama Lost Boys and Fairies.

Mahoney founded the Cardiff Music Festival in 2011 and is a visiting director at the Royal Welsh College of Music and Drama.

He was the show producer of the 2015, 2016, 2017, 2018 and 2019 BAFTA Cymru Awards (hosted by BBC Radio DJ Huw Stephens). Other productions include the 'Life in Song' series at London's Royal Festival Hall (for Senbla / BBC) featuring Pete Waterman, Tony Hatch, Tim Rice and Burt Bacharach.

Further productions include UEFA live broadcasts (artistic director), Quincy Jones Live in Concert (associate producer), Walt Disney World 50th Anniversary (conductor and creative consultant), and the Raise Your Voice Gala at New York's Lincoln Center (creative director), starring Julie Andrews, Keith Urban, Roger Daltrey and Sam Smith.
