= In Festive Mood =

Studio album by Only Men Aloud!
- Released: 28 November 2011
- Recorded: 2011
- Genre: Pop
- Length: 52:09
- Label: OMA Records
- Producer: Nick Patrick

Only Men Aloud! chronology
Band of Brothers (2009)	In Festive Mood (2011)

In Festive Mood is the third studio album by male voice choir from Wales Only Men Aloud!. The album was released in the United Kingdom on 28 November 2011. The album only peaked to number 142 on the UK Albums Chart. The album was produced by Nick Patrick.

== Background ==
On 14 November 2011 it was announced that In Festive Mood would be the third album released by Only Men Aloud! on 28 November 2011. Much of the repertoire is influenced by the choir's two previous sell out Christmas tours. The album includes a selection of well known Christmas carols, pop songs and seasonal favourites all given the Only Men Aloud twist!

== Track listing ==
Standard listing

1. "It's the Most Wonderful Time of the Year" – 2:43
2. "O Holy Night" – 5:46
3. "Last Christmas" – 3:49
4. "Drummer Boy" – 3:31
5. "Silent Night / I'll Be Home for Christmas" – 5:46
6. "Sleigh Ride" – 2:26
7. "In The Bleak Midwinter" – 4:49
8. "Santa Baby" – 4:30
9. "Ave Maria" – 4:14
10. "Christmas Bells" (Carol of the Bells / God Rest Ye Merry Gentlemen / Tua Bethlehem Dref) – 4:58
11. "Hwiangerdd Mair" (Mary's Lullaby) – 3:31
12. "Rule The World" – 6:09

== Chart performance ==
Chart (2011)	Peak position
UK Albums Chart	124

== Release history ==
Country	Release date	Format(s)	Label
United Kingdom	25 November 2011	Digital download	OMA Records
United Kingdom	28 November 2011	CD	OMA Records
