= Gwawr Edwards =

Welsh singer

Gwawr Edwards (born c. 1984) is a Welsh concert soprano. Edwards is best known for her television and radio appearances, and has recorded with Bryn Terfel.

Gwawr Edwards was born in Aberystwyth, into a farming family, and studied music at the Royal Welsh College of Music and Drama and the Guildhall School of Music and Drama, London. She is a former winner of the Solo Competition at Llangollen International Eisteddfod the Towyn Roberts competition and the Osbourne Roberts competition at the National Eisteddfod of Wales. She has toured with Glyndebourne Opera and Only Men Aloud! She has performed as a soloist at events at the Royal Albert Hall, the Wales Millennium Centre, at Highgrove (for the Prince of Wales’ Trust Appeal) Royal Festival Hall, Cadogan Hall, Birmingham Symphony Hall, Glasgow Royal Concert Hall, and Manchester Bridgewater Hall, with orchestras such as the Liverpool Philharmonic Orchestra, the BBC Concert Orchestra, London Symphony Orchestra and the National Orchestra of Wales. In 2011 she appeared in a music festival organised Only Men Aloud supporting the Noah’s Ark Appeal, the pancreatic cancer charity Amser Justin Time and the Elizabeth Evans Trust, of which she is a former award winner.

In opera, she has sung the roles of Paquette in Bernstein's Candide, Rosina in Rossini's Il Barbiere di Siviglia, Melpomene in Gluck's Il Parnaso confuso, Euridice in Charpentier's La descente d'Orphée aux Enfers, Zerlina in Mozart's Don Giovanni, Virtu in Monteverdi's L’incoronazione di Poppea, and Donna in Handel's Rinaldo, for companies such as Glyndeboyrne Festival and Tour, Opera de Lorraine, Bampton, and Opera Cymru.

== Albums ==
- Gwawr Edwards (2010)
- Alleluia (2015)
- Blue Jay & Red Cardinal (2016)
