= Hubert Main =

Hubert Platt Main
- Born: August 17, 1839; Ridgefield, Connecticut, US
- Died: October 7, 1925 (aged 86); Newark, New Jersey, US
- Resting place: Bloomfield Cemetery, Essex County, New Jersey
- Occupations: hymnwriter, publisher

Hubert Platt Main (1839–1925) MA D.D. was an American hymn writer and publisher.

== Early and family life ==
The son of Sylvester Main, a singing school teacher, Hubert Platt Main was born in Ridgefield, Connecticut in 1839 and attended local singing school until 1854, when he went to New York City to work as an errand boy in a wallpaper business. Main later earned a D.D. degree.

== Career ==
The following April, Hubert Main took a similar entry-level job at the Bristow and Morse publishing company. He also helped his father publish the Sunday School Lute songbook by I.B. Woodbury. In 1864, Sylvester Main invested in a William Bradbury's publishing business, and Hubert was working there by 1867. Upon Bradbury's death the following year, the Mains founded the Biglow and Main music publishing house as its successor. One of the firm's major hymnwriters was Fanny VanAlstyne Crosby.

Hubert Main worked with his father until his father's death in 1873, and ultimately published over 500 works. He also partnered with other music editors, including George A. Bell, Mrs. Wilbur F. Crafts and Ira D. Sankey (part of Dwight Moody's evangelism team). Main arranged music, as well as wrote over 1000 pieces, from singing school songs to Sunday school music and hymns. Biglow and Main was acquired by Hope Publishing Company in 1922.

Main also collected music books, and in 1906 sold his collection (over 3,500 volumes) to the Newberry Library in Chicago, Illinois, where they form the core of its Americana collection.

== Death and legacy ==
Main died in Newark, New Jersey on October 7, 1925, and was buried in Bloomfield Cemetery in Essex County. Several of his hymns continue to be republished today.

== Major publications ==
- Book of Praise for the Sunday School, with George A. Bell (New York: Biglow & Main, 1875)
- Little Pilgrim Songs, with Mrs. Wilbur F. Crafts (New York: Biglow & Main, 1884)
- Hymns of Praise, with George A. Bell (New York: Biglow & Main, 1884)
- Gems of Song for the Sunday School, with Ira Sankey (Chicago, Illinois: The Biglow & Main Co., 1901)
- Quartettes for Mens Voices: Sacred and Social Selections, with George B. Hodge (Y.M.C.A., 1913)
