= Band of Brothers (Only Men Aloud! album) =

Studio album by Only Men Aloud!
- Released: 12 October 2009
- Recorded: 2009
- Genre: Classical music

Only Men Aloud! chronology
Only Men Aloud! (2008)	Band of Brothers (2009)	In Festive Mood (2011)

Band of Brothers is the second studio album by the choir Only Men Aloud!. Unlike their self-titled debut, it featured several traditional Welsh songs, the album closing with a version of "Land of My Fathers". However, as on the first album, the choir also included covers of pop songs "Total Eclipse of the Heart", a duet with the original singer Bonnie Tyler, "Somebody to Love" with featured vocalist Kerry Ellis, and "Scarborough Fair".

== Track listing ==
1. "O Verona"
2. "Total Eclipse of the Heart" (featuring Bonnie Tyler)
3. "Band of Brothers"
4. "Blaenwern"
5. "Men of Harlech"
6. "Pearl Fishers"
7. "Ar Lan y Mor"
8. "The Longest Time"
9. "My Love Is Like a Red, Red Rose"
10. "Somebody to Love" (featuring Kerry Ellis)
11. "Gwahoddiad"
12. "Scarboro' Fair"
13. "Hen Wlad Fy Nhadau (Land of My Fathers)"

== Charts ==
The album entered the UK Album Chart on 18 October 2009 at number 21.

Chart (2009)	Peak position
UK Albums Chart	21
Classical Charts	1

== Awards ==
Classic Brit Awards

Year	Work	Award	Result	Ref
2010	Band of Brothers	Album of the Year	Won	
