= Only Men Aloud! (album) =

Only Men Aloud

Studio album by Only Men Aloud!
- Released: 14 November 2008
- Recorded: 2008
- Genre: Classical music

Only Men Aloud! chronology
Only Men Aloud (2008)	Band Of Brothers (2009)

Only Men Aloud! is the debut album by the choir Only Men Aloud!.

== Track listing ==
No.	Title	Length
1.	"All By Myself"	3:59
2.	"Don't Rain on My Parade"	3:15
3.	"Angels"	3:25
4.	"MacArthur Park"	4:35
5.	"God Only Knows"	2:46
6.	"Bridge over Troubled Water"	4:11
7.	"You're a Lady"	4:09
8.	"Cwm Rhondda"	2:59
9.	"One Voice"	3:20
10.	"Kiss From a Rose"	4:50
11.	"Have Yourself a Merry Little Christmas"	4:23

== Charts ==
=== Weekly charts ===
Chart (2008)	Peak position
Scottish Albums (OCC)	29
UK Albums (OCC)	16

=== Year-end charts ===
Chart (2008)	Position
UK Albums (OCC)	92

== Certifications ==
Region	Certification	Certified units/sales
United Kingdom (BPI)	Gold	100,000^{^}
^{^} Shipments figures based on certification alone.
