= Lewis Hartsough =

American poet (1828–1919)

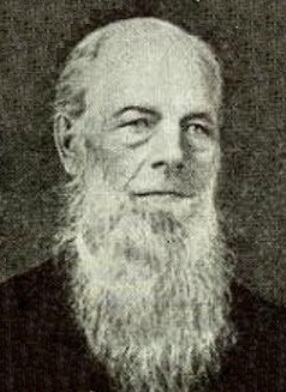
- Born: August 31, 1828; Ithaca, New York
- Died: January 1, 1919 (aged 90); Mount Vernon, Iowa
- Education: Cazenovia Seminary, New York
- Occupations: Evangelist and gospel song writer

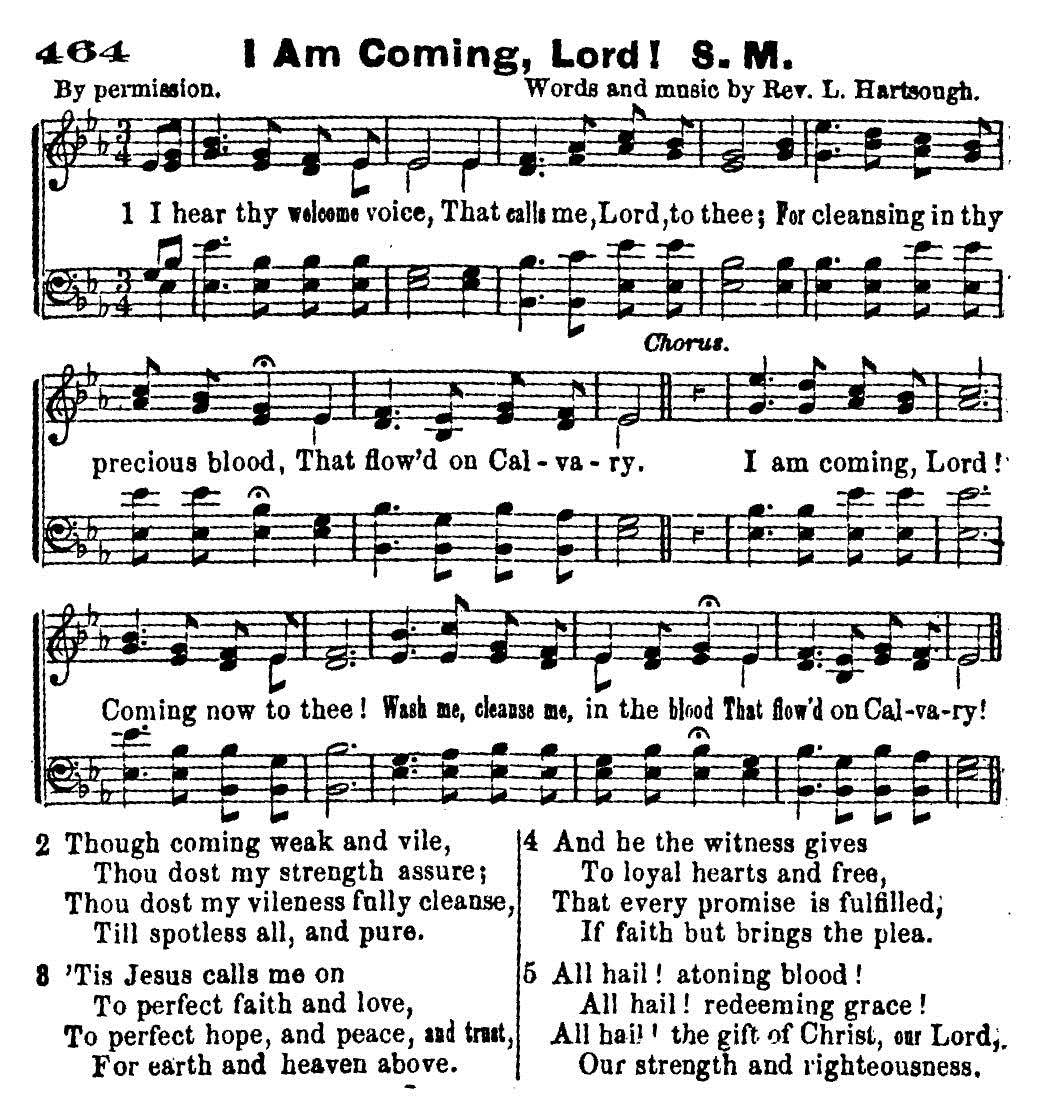
Hartsough's "Gwahoddiad", 1872

Lewis Hartsough (August 31, 1828 – January 1, 1919) was a Methodist evangelist and gospel song writer. (Note: His given name is often misspelled "Louis" perhaps because Hartsough was inclined to indicate the name by merely its first initial.)

== Biography ==
Lewis Hartsough was born in Ithaca, New York on August 31, 1828. In 1853, one year after graduation from Cazenovia Seminary, he was ordained and commenced a 15-year ministry in the Oneida Conference of Upstate New York. He was also cultivating his interest in religious poetry and music, as in 1858 he wrote the lyrics for "I Love to Sing of Heaven" (customarily matched to tunes by Charles W. Dunbar or William B. Bradbury). While serving the South Street Methodist Episcopal Church in Utica, New York, Hartsough met publisher Joseph Hillman, a concurrence which was to have long-lasting effects even though Hartsough, for health reasons, had to request relocation to a drier climate. Hartsough transferred to the Utah Mission as its first superintendent and became the presiding elder of the Wyoming District.

In 1868, Hartsough, while in Wyoming but still in communication with Hillman, became musical editor of the Revivalist, a compendium of hymns and gospel songs which ultimately had 11 editions as items were removed or added. The Revivalist was published by Hillman in Troy, New York, with Hartsough and Hillman conducting most of their business through the mail.

In 1871, Hartsough moved to a congregation in Epworth, Iowa. (Note: The eponymous English town in Lincolnshire was the birthplace of John Wesley (1773–1791), the foremost founder of Methodism.) There, during a revival meeting, Hartsough finalized, and soon published in the Revivalist, the one gospel song (both words and tune being his) for which he is remembered because of its international popularity—“I Am Coming, Lord” (also known by its first line “I hear thy welcome voice”). In 1873 the song came to the attention of Ira D. Sankey as he sang for Dwight L. Moody during evangelistic campaigns in the United Kingdom, where it became known as "Gwahoddiad" from its translation into Welsh. (Note: "Gwahoddiad" is the Welsh word for "invitation", the genre to which the song belongs from its use as an invitation song.)

According to hymnologist William Jensen Reynolds, Hartsough during his ministerial career served 15 congregations and five Methodist districts. He traveled some 400,000 miles while making 9,000 ministerial visits to members in need and participated in 7,000 prayer meetings and other church gatherings. Hartsough preached approximately 1,500 sermons.

He spent the last years of his life in Mount Vernon, Iowa. He died at his home there on January 1, 1919.
