= Tim Rhys-Evans =

Welsh conductor

Tim Rhys-Evans MBE
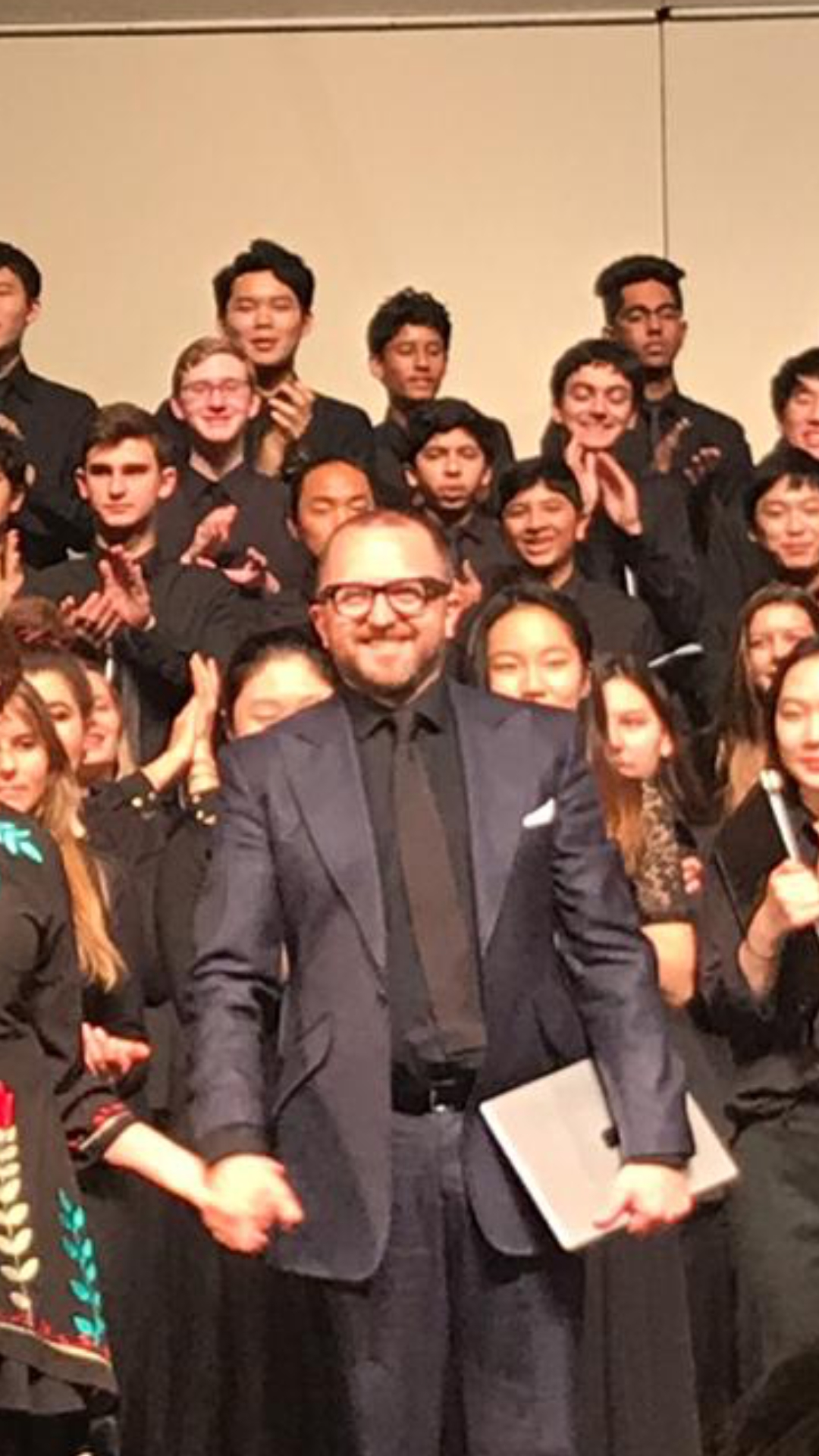
- Rhys-Evans conducting at the AMIS Honor Choir 2019 in Beijing, China
- Born: Timothy Rhys-Evans; New Tredegar, Wales
- Occupation: Conductor
- Spouse: Alun Rhys Jenkins

Timothy Rhys-Evans MBE FRWCMD (born c. 1972) is a Welsh conductor and best known as the founder of the choir Only Men Aloud! and Only Boys Aloud. He also formed the children's choir Only Kids Aloud in 2012.

Rhys-Evans, from New Tredegar, was a vocal tutor at the Royal Welsh College of Music and Drama. He has conducted several choirs, including The Black Mountain Male Chorus of Wales and Dunvant Male Choir. He founded Only Men Aloud! in 2000 (also known at Cantorion) and led them to victory in the Last Choir Standing competition in 2008.

In August 2010, Rhys-Evans was one of several new members admitted to the Gorsedd of bards at the National Eisteddfod of Wales. He is a Champion for the charity Music in Hospitals Cymru/Wales. He was appointed Member of the Order of the British Empire (MBE) in the 2013 Birthday Honours for services to music and for charitable services.

On 5 July 2019 Rhys-Evans was made a Fellow of the Royal Welsh College of Music and Drama.

In January 2020, Rhys-Evans stepped down from his role with The Aloud Charity and Only Boys Aloud and was appointed Director of Music at the Royal Welsh College of Music and Drama.

== Personal life ==
Tim has a civil partnership with Welsh tenor Alun Rhys Jenkins.
