= Canolfan Soar =

Grade II-listed community facility in Wales

Coordinates: 51.7487°N 3.37786°W

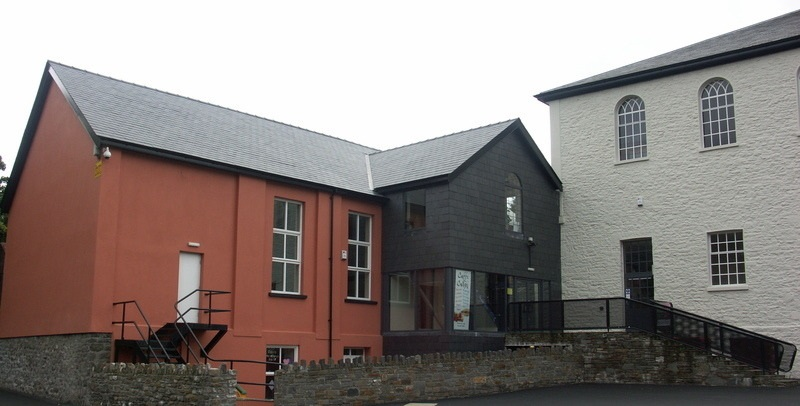

Canolfan Soar (English: Zoar Centre) is a Grade II-listed community facility in Merthyr Tydfil, Wales, that includes a theatre and other facilities. It was converted from the closed Grade II-listed, eighteenth-century, Zoar Chapel in the first decade of the twenty-first century.

== History ==
Canolfan Soar is a bilingual facility in the town centre that includes a theatre, dance studio, music rehearsal rooms, café bar, book shop, teaching rooms and flexible exhibition, meeting and conference facilities. At its heart is Theatr Soar, an intimate venue for the performing arts. Its 200-seat auditorium held its opening performance in February 2011. Six years of planning, fundraising and development transformed the Zoar Chapel, and the adjoining vestry building.

Zoar Chapel was completed in March 1842 and was a Welsh Congregationalist church. It replaced an earlier structure of 1823 at the cost of £2,300. The building was Grade II listed on 22 August 1975. Before it closed in 2005, it had been one of the largest chapels in Wales. Dr. Joseph Parry, composer of Myfanwy, led y Gymanfa Ganu there for many years.

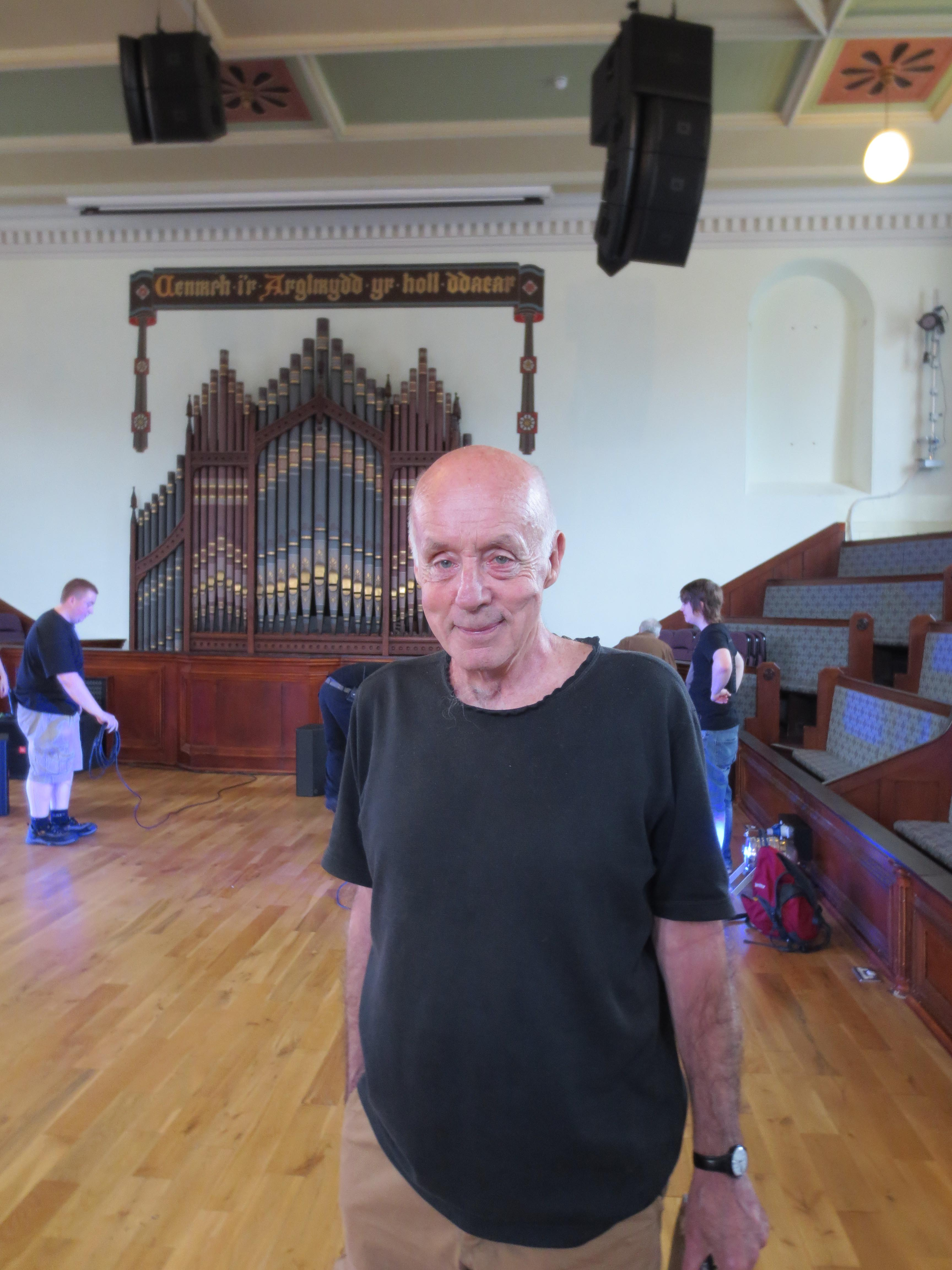
The film and television director Karl Francis in the Theatr Soar auditorium

== Description ==
Zoar Chapel was built of two storeys, in the classical tradition. The top floor, was an octagonal gallery, with steeply-tiered wooden pews on two main sides, one end and two short wings; one between each side and the end. The rectangular building was built of rubble stone with its entrances in a symmetrical five-bay front on the north side. The hipped slate roof has wide eaves. The arched upper windows have fixed, iron, Gothic glazing bars.
