= David Sankey =

American politician

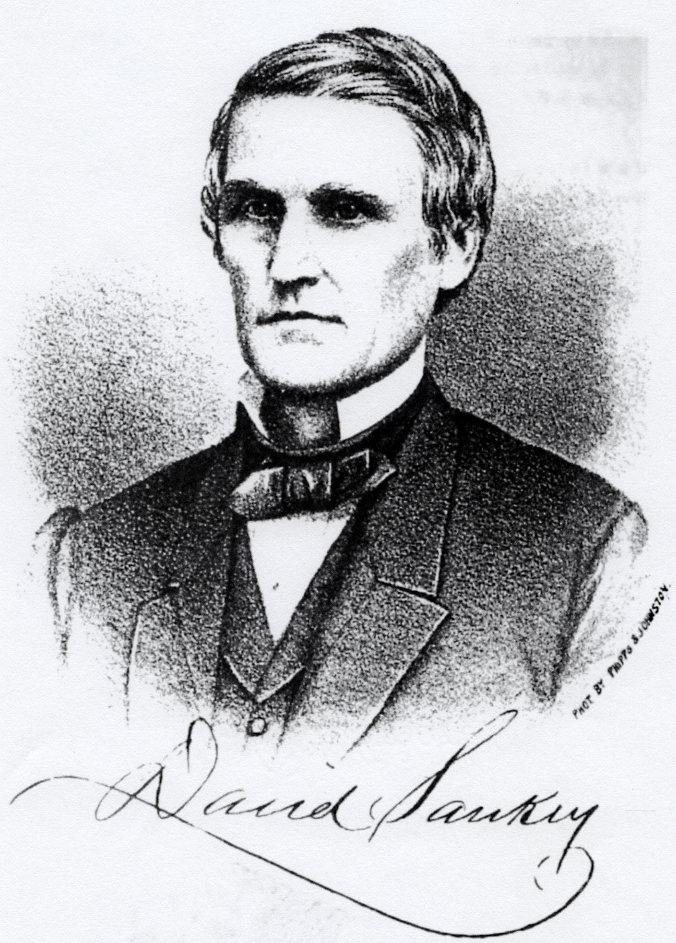
Sankey in an 1872 portrait.

David Sankey (January 10, 1809 - January 5, 1884) was a Pennsylvanian state Senator, tax collector, and founder of the movement for the creation of Lawrence County, Pennsylvania. He is most recognized as the father of Ira D. Sankey, the gospel hymnist and musician.

Sankey was elected Representative in the General Assembly from Mercer County, Pennsylvania, in 1843 and to the State Senate from Mercer and Beaver Counties in 1847 to 1849. It was in the Session of 1849 that the law was enacted creating Lawrence Country from parts of Beaver and Mercer Counties, and it was largely through the efforts of Senator David Sankey that this was accomplished. In 1851, he was appointed to the State Board of Equalization, was Treasurer of Northwestern Railway in 1856, and President of the Bank of New Castle in 1857. In 1862, he was appointed Collector of Internal Revenue for the 24th Congressional District, and from 1867 to 1874 he conducted a newspaper published in New Castle, known as the Lawrence Journal.

Ira D. Sankey, son of David Sankey, mentioned once his father's disapproval of his work in evangelical hymn-writing and singing. His father was a business man and had evidently pictured a business career for his son. His father said to his mother "I am afraid that boy will never amount to anything; all he does is to run about the country with a hymn book under his arm." His mother replied that she would rather see him with a hymn book under his arm, than with a whiskey bottle in his pocket.
