= Elizabeth Clephane =

Scottish songwriter (1830–1869)

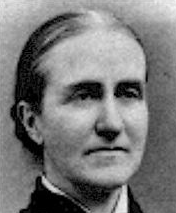
- Elizabeth Clephane, from an undated photograph.
- Born: 18 June 1830; Edinburgh
- Died: 19 February 1869 (aged 38); Melrose, Roxburghshire
- Occupation: Hymn writer

Elizabeth Cecilia Douglas Clephane (18 June 1830 – 19 February 1869) was a Scottish songwriter, who wrote the hymns "The Ninety and Nine" and "Beneath the Cross of Jesus".

== Early life ==
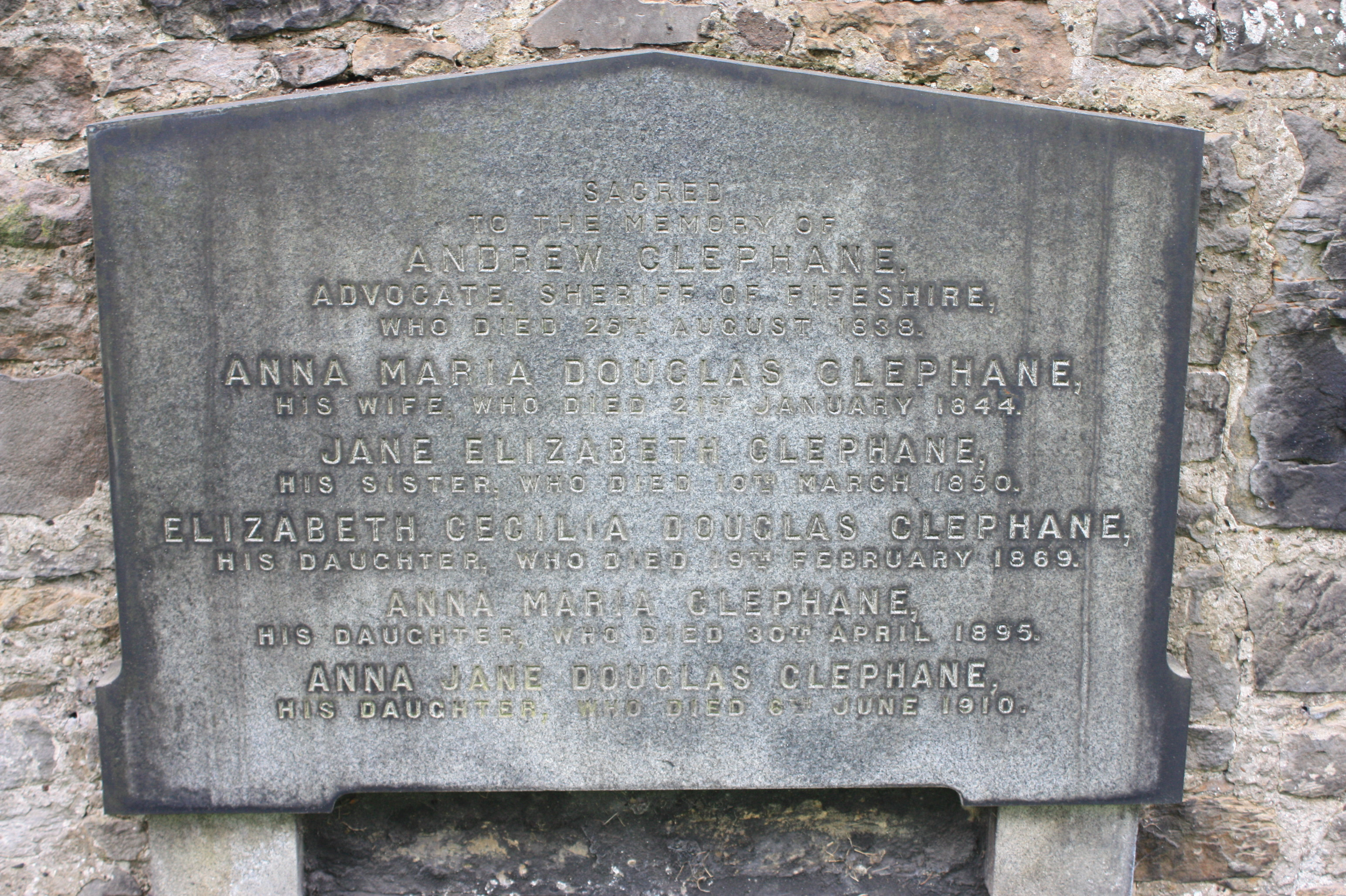
The grave of Elizabeth Clephane, St Cuthberts churchyard, Edinburgh

Clephane was born at 5 West Circus Place in Edinburgh, Scotland, the third daughter of Andrew Douglas Clephane FRSE (1780-1838), advocate and Sheriff of Fife, and his wife, Anna Maria Douglas (daughter of Lt Col Robert Douglas and Anna Maria Ashenhurst).

== Hymns ==
Eight hymns by Clephane were published posthumously in The Family Treasury, a Presbyterian magazine, between 1872 and 1874. Clephane's hymns were promoted in America by Ira D. Sankey who wrote a tune entitled "Clephane" to accompany "The Ninety and Nine". Another Clephane hymn, "Beneath the Cross of Jesus", is often heard at Easter, and is usually sung to the tune "St Christopher" by English organist Frederick Charles Maker.

Clephane's "The Ninety and Nine" is a reference to the Parable of the Lost Sheep, ending with the celebratory lines, "And the angels echoed around the throne, 'Rejoice, for the Lord brings back His own!'" It was sometimes performed on special occasions by a choir of 99 singers. The hymn was said to be written after the death of her brother, George Clephane (1819-1851), who had a troubled life in Canada. As the story goes, he fell from his horse while intoxicated, struck his head upon a rock and died. His grave site at Fergus, Ontario, Canada has become a site of interest for admirers of Clephane's hymns. A memorial service was held there in 1933, as part of the town's centennial observances.

== Personal life ==
Clephane was considered frail. She gave much to poor relief; it is said that she sold her horses to raise money for philanthropic causes. She died in 1869, aged 38 years, at Bridgend House, near Melrose, Roxburghshire, Scotland where she had spent most of her later life. Her grave is with her parents' graves in St Cuthbert's churchyard in central Edinburgh. There is also a memorial brass plaque to Clephane at Melrose Abbey.
