= Only Men Aloud! =

Welsh male voice choir

Only Men Aloud
- Origin: Cardiff, Wales
- Genre: Choral music
- Occupation: Choir
- Years active: 2000–present
- Labels: Universal Music Group; Decca Records
- Members: Wyn Davies; David Fortey; Paul Rothwell; Steffan Hughes; Niall Allen; Craig Yates; Huw Euron; Stephen Hamnett
- Past members: David Thaxton; Noel Sullivan; David Mahoney; Jon Robyns; Alan Winner
- Website: www.onlymenaloud.com

Only Men Aloud is a male voice choir from Wales. The choir came to national prominence in the UK when they won the Last Choir Standing competition run by BBC television during 2008.

== Overview ==
The choir was formed in the year 2000 by Tim Rhys-Evans, a classically trained singer and former musical director of Welsh National Youth Opera. It originally had 15 members and is based in Cardiff.

Following Last Choir Standing, the choir signed a five-record deal with Universal Music and released their first album. They performed with Josh Groban at The Royal Variety Performance in 2008.

The choir embarked on their first UK tour in April/May 2009 with singer and soap star Amy Nuttall joining them as a special guest. The performance at the Cardiff International Arena featured a one-off performance with Bonnie Tyler.

In October 2009, the choir held auditions at the Wales Millennium Centre, Cardiff to find two new members to join them. Later that month the choir's second album, Band of Brothers, went straight to number one in the UK Classical Charts, where it remained for three weeks. The album went on to win the NS&I Album of the Year 2010 at the Classical Brit awards.

The choir embarked on their second UK tour in December 2009. Their special guest was Welsh soprano Gwawr Edwards. In 2010, the choir was given its own Welsh-language television series, Only Men Aloud, on S4C.

In May 2010 Tim Rhys Evans embarked on a new project, to revive the male voice choir tradition, by forming Only Boys Aloud. The boys made their first public appearance at the Ebbw Vale Eisteddfod in Ebbw Vale and received three standing ovations for their renditions of "Calon Lân", "Sosban Fach" and "Don't Stop Believin'".

Only Men Aloud! completed a 16-date UK Christmas Tour in December 2010. Their special guest was West End singer, Katy Treharne. The show at the CIA in Cardiff also featured Only Boys Aloud who sang "Don't Stop Believin'" and "You Raise me Up" with Only Men Aloud!

Only Men Aloud! were also the musical guests on the Christmas Day 2010 edition of BBC One's Strictly Come Dancing. They sang a specially-arranged version of "Silent Night" and "I'll Be Home for Christmas".

In 2011, Only Men Aloud released their third album called In Festive Mood, made a 15-date UK Christmas Tour and released Only Men Aloud - The Book. In Festive Mood entered the UK Classical Charts at Number 8. A BBC Wales series, Only Boys Aloud: the Academy, was devoted to Only Boys Aloud.

On 27 July 2012, Only Men Aloud performed at the opening ceremony of the 2012 Olympic Games. They performed on Caliban's Dream, as the Olympic cauldron was lit. The track is featured on the soundtrack of the ceremony, Isles of Wonder. It was digitally released as a downloadable track on iTunes at midnight on 27 July after the ceremony. It was the highest placed track from the soundtrack on iTunes in the UK, reaching no. 5 when the charts were announced on 29 July. On 5 August, it entered the main charts at number 12.

Tim Rhys-Evans was awarded an MBE in the Queen's Birthday Honours list in June 2013. He was awarded the honour for services to music and for charitable services.

In May 2013, It was announced that Only Men Aloud would go through a radical restructure later in the year to become an eight piece group. The decision was made for logistical reasons as they looked to expand their global appeal. At the end of September 2013, the new look line up was announced and the new eight piece group performed two shows in the Elgar Rooms, Royal Albert Hall. In 2014 they made a 12-date spring tour of Wales, a summer tour of the Midwest of the US, and a 12-date UK Christmas Tour. Another two-part TV series for S4C was shown in December. In February 2015, Only Men Aloud cycled from Cardiff to Paris for charity, arriving in time to sing the Welsh National Anthem on the pitch before the France vs Wales RBS Six Nations game.

In 2015, Only Men Aloud performed at the opening ceremony of the Ashes Test series at Sophia Gardens in Cardiff. The group continued to perform across the United Kingdom, releasing the album Only Men Aloud on the Road in September 2015 and undertaking their biggest ever tour, with a 28 date tour, right across the UK. They recorded a television show for S4C; Only Men Aloud Y Sioe which was filmed in Cardiff.

In 2016, Only Men Aloud opened the National Eisteddfod which was held in Abergavenny. They performed with Amy Wadge on the Severn Bridge for BBC Music Day.

Only Men Aloud travelled to Asia for the first time in 2017 to take their music to India. They recorded a TV show for S4C where the Men had to learn a Bollywood song and dance routine and work with a group of children from Mumbai.. They performed at the 2017 UEFA Champions League Final in Cardiff and went on a UK tour with Cory Band.

To celebrate ten years since winning Last Choir Standing, Only Men Aloud celebrated a UK wide Decade Tour which included a sold out night at Wales Millennium Centre. Their album Favourites was released in October 2018.

Only Men Aloud were invited by Disneyland Paris to perform at their Welsh Festival in 2019 and 2020.

In 2021, Only Men Aloud were one of the first acts to hold a live concert after the lockdown. They headlined an outdoor concert in Cardiff Castle with John Owen Jones as their guest.

In 2022, the group performed as a support act for Diana Ross at Cardiff Castle.

In 2024, Only Men Aloud returned to touring with its first tour in five years, performing at venues across Wales and England.

The group marked its 25th anniversary with a series of concerts across Wales in 2025. The tour featured an eight-member line-up and included a performance with Only Boys Aloud at Cardiff's New Theatre.

Only Men Aloud were asked if they would sing at the funeral of Bonnie Tyler which was held in Swansea Minster on 17th August 2026. They performed their version of Total Eclipse of the Heart and Bridge over Troubled Water as part of the service.

== Discography ==
=== Albums ===
Title	Album details	Chart peak positions
Title	Album details	UK
Only Men Aloud!	Released: 24 November 2008; Genre: Choral Music; Label: Universal Music Group, Decca Records	16
Band of Brothers	Released: 12 October 2009; Genre: Choral Music; Label: Universal Music Group, Decca Records	21
In Festive Mood	Released: 28 November 2011; Genre: Choral Music; Label: OMA Records	124
Only Men Aloud Unplugged	Released: 24 August 2014; Genre: Choral Music; Label: OMA Records	
Only Men Aloud on the Road	Released: 1 September 2015; Genre: Choral Music; Label: OMA Records	
Favourites	Released: 29 October 2018; Genre: Choral Music; Label: OMA Records	

=== Singles ===
Year	Single	Album
2008	"All By Myself"	Only Men Aloud!
2009	"Total Eclipse of the Heart"	Band of Brothers

=== As featured artist ===
Year	Single	Peak chart positions	Album
Year	Single	UK	Album
2012	"Caliban's Dream" (Underworld featuring Dockhead Choir, Dame Evelyn Glennie, Only Men Aloud!, Elizabeth Roberts, Alex Trimble)	12	Isles of Wonder: Music for the Opening Ceremony of the London 2012 Olympic Games

== Awards ==
=== Classic Brit Awards ===
Year	Work	Award	Result	Ref
2010	Band of Brothers	Album of the Year	Won	

=== British Phonographic Industry ===
Year	Work	Award	Ref
2013	Only Men Aloud	Gold	
