= Tom Sankey (footballer) =

English footballer

Personal information
- Date of birth: 24 October 1891
- Place of birth: Stanton Hill, England
- Date of death: 1974 (aged 82–83)
- Position: Forward

Senior career*
Years	Team	Apps	(Gls)
1920	Huthwaite Colliery		
1921–1921	Grimsby Town	4	(0)
- * Club domestic league appearances and goals

Thomas Sankey (24 October 1891 – 1974) was an English professional footballer who played as a forward.
