= Sacred Songs and Solos =

Hymn collection compiled by Ira David Sankey

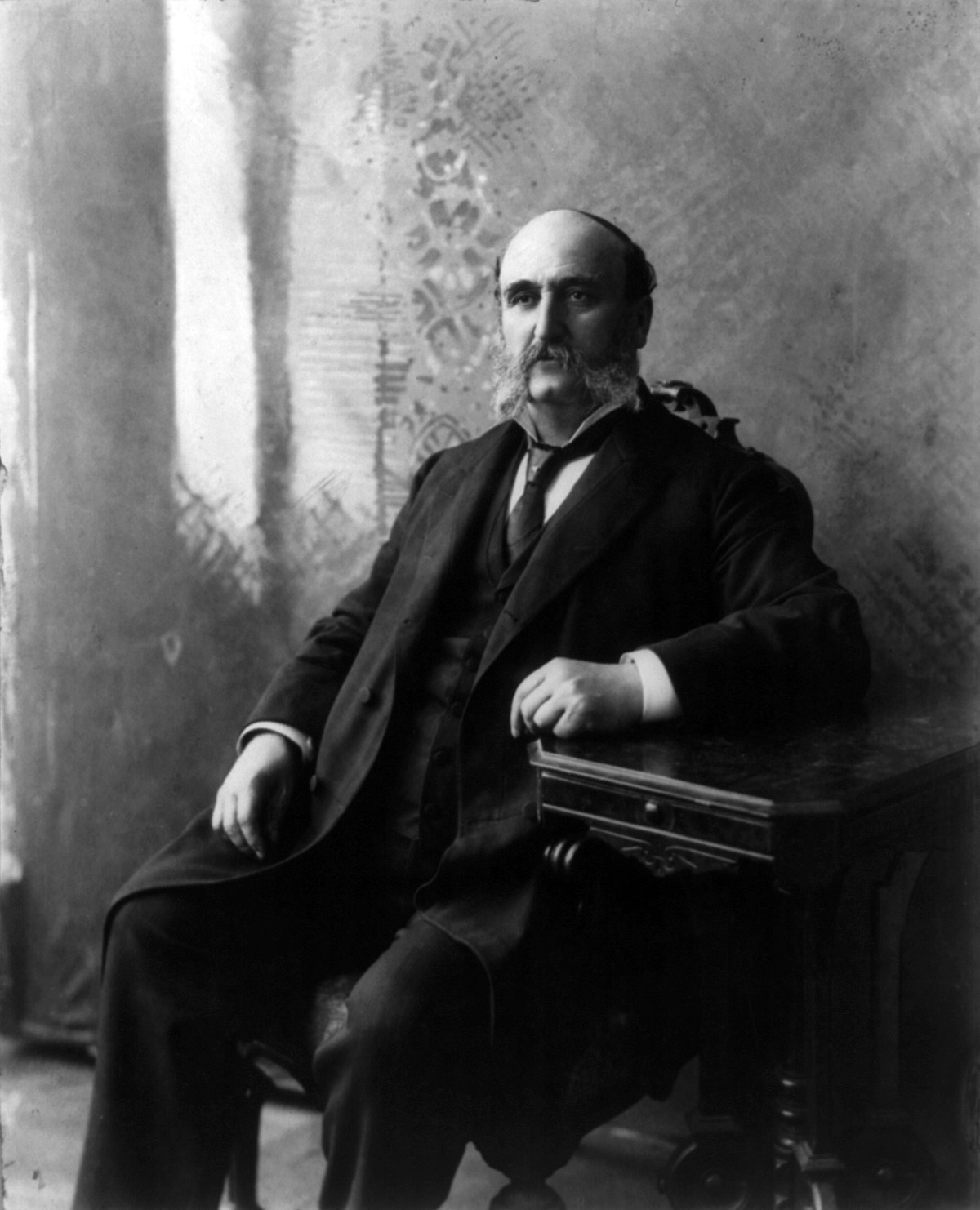
Ira D. Sankey

Sacred Songs and Solos is a hymn collection compiled by Ira David Sankey, who partnered Dwight Lyman Moody in a series of evangelical crusades from 1870 until Moody's death in 1898. The collection first appeared in 1873, and has subsequently been published in many editions and formats, expanding to a final volume of 1200 pieces that appeared around 1907. Although the publication was and is popularly known as Sankey and Moody's Songs, or The Sankey-Moody Hymnbook, many of the tunes and lyrics are by other authors, and the volume includes many standard church hymns. Around 200 of the tunes were written or arranged by Sankey.

Sacred Songs and Solos has been translated into many languages. Worldwide sales exceed 50 million.

John Young Wai, a Chinese Australian Presbyterian minister, translated 302 Sankey and Moody hymns into Chinese, which were used throughout Australasia.

== See also ==
- List of hymns composed by Ira D. Sankey
