= Ira D. Sankey =

American gospel singer and composer

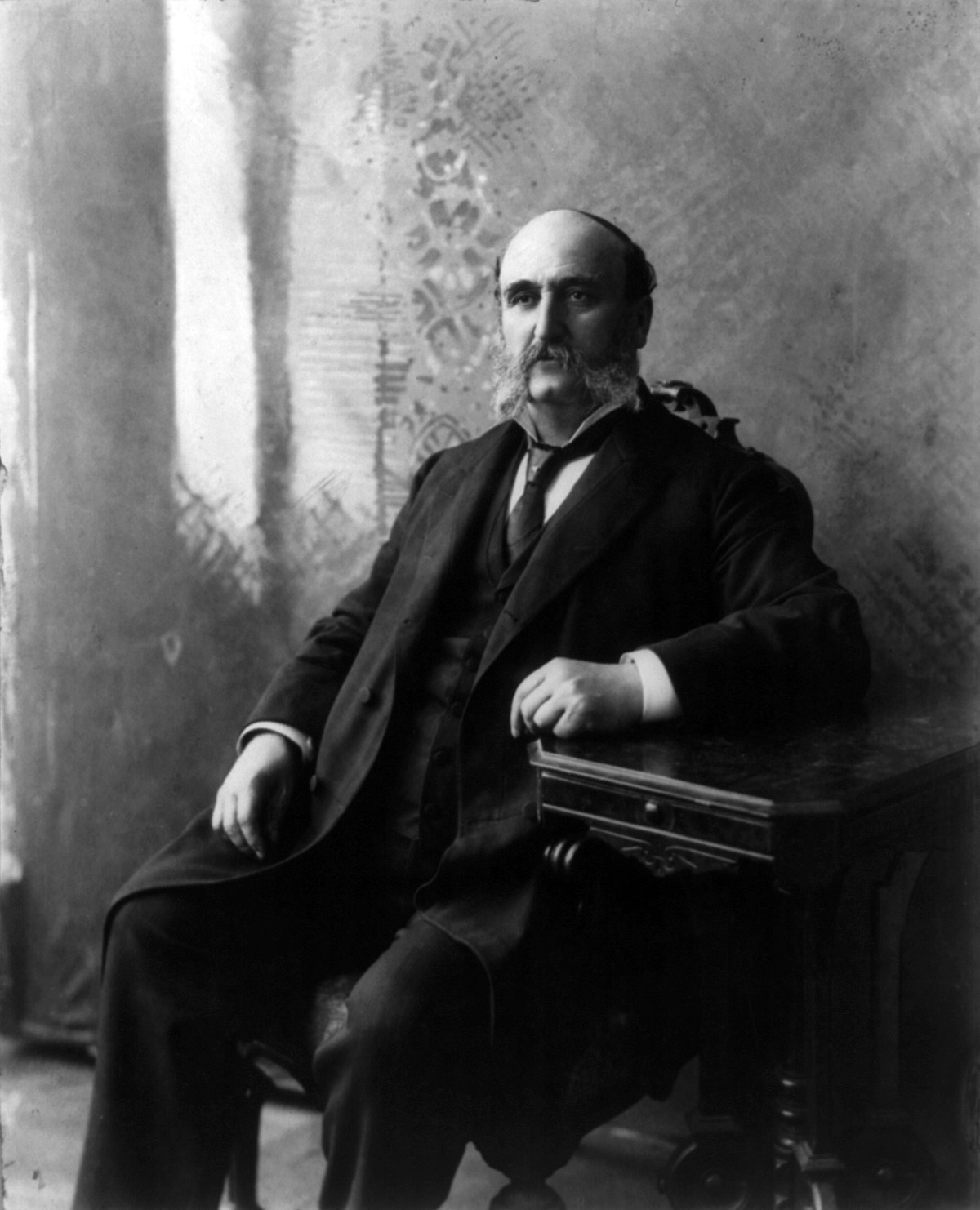
- Born: Ira David Sankey; August 28, 1840; Edinburg, Lawrence County, Pennsylvania
- Died: August 13, 1908 (aged 67); Brooklyn, New York
- Occupations: Gospel singer and composer
- Spouse: Fanny Victoria Edwards (m. 1863)
- Children: John E. Sankey (1868–1912); Ira Allan Sankey
- Parent(s): David Sankey; Mary Leeper Sankey

Ira David Sankey (August 28, 1840 – August 13, 1908) was an American gospel singer and composer, known for his long association with Dwight L. Moody in a series of religious revival campaigns in America and Britain during the closing decades of the 19th century. Sankey was a pioneer in the introduction of a musical style that influenced church services and evangelical campaigns for generations, and the hymns that he wrote or popularized continued to be sung well into the 21st century.

Sankey, born in Pennsylvania, was an amateur singer and church worker when he was recruited by Moody in 1870 after the latter heard him sing at a convention. Until Moody died in 1899 the two campaigned together, Moody preaching while Sankey sang both old and new hymns, inspired by writers such as Fanny Crosby and Philip Bliss. Sankey also became a prolific composer of hymn tunes, and a compiler and editor of popular hymn collections, in particular Sacred Songs and Solos and Gospel Hymns and Sacred Songs. The proceeds from these publishing ventures were used for a range of charitable purposes.

After Moody's death, Sankey attempted to carry on the work alone but was defeated by ill-health and the eventual loss of his eyesight. He died in 1908. He was inducted into the Gospel Music Hall of Fame in 1980.

== Life ==
=== Background and early years ===
Sankey was born in Edinburg, Pennsylvania, on August 28, 1840, one of nine children of David Sankey and his wife Mary Leeper Sankey. The family's ancestry was English on the father's side and a mix of Scottish and Irish on the mother's. David Sankey was a banker, a former state senator and a Methodist lay preacher. As a young boy Ira displayed a love of music that was encouraged by his parents, who typically spent evenings with him at home, singing hymns. At the age of eight, he began attending Sunday school.

When he was 19, Ira underwent an experience of religious conversion at a revivalist meeting held at a nearby church, King's Chapel. A year later the family moved to New Castle, where the young Sankey joined the local Methodist Episcopal Church. His enthusiasm and talents were quickly recognized and led to his appointment as Sunday school superintendent and choirmaster.

In 1861, at the start of the American Civil War, Sankey answered President Lincoln's call for volunteers and joined the Twelfth Pennsylvania Regiment. He served between 1861 and 1863. In the army he continued his religious and singing activities, forming a choir and assisting the chaplain. When his period of enlistment was over he returned to New Castle, where Lincoln had appointed his father as a Collector of Internal Revenue. In 1863 Sankey joined his father in government service and, that same year, married Fanny Edwards, a member of his choir.

=== With Dwight L. Moody ===
==== Early campaigns ====
Back in New Castle, Sankey developed a local reputation as a singer, much in demand in churches and revival meetings. In 1867, when a local branch of the YMCA was formed, Sankey became its secretary and later its president. As president, in 1870 he was a delegate at a national conference held in Indianapolis, where he encountered the noted preacher Dwight L. Moody for the first time. Moody was instantly impressed as Sankey demonstrated his ability to enliven an audience rendered soporific by inactivity and overlong prayers by giving an impromptu rendering of the hymn "There is a fountain filled with blood". Meeting Sankey at the end of the session, Moody demanded that the young man join him in his mission work: "I have been looking for you for the last eight years". Unable to decide on the spur of the moment, Sankey returned to New Castle and pondered Moody's challenge for six months before deciding to return to Chicago for a week's trial with Moody. Before the week was up he resigned his government post and threw in his lot with Moody's mission, thus beginning their lifelong partnership.

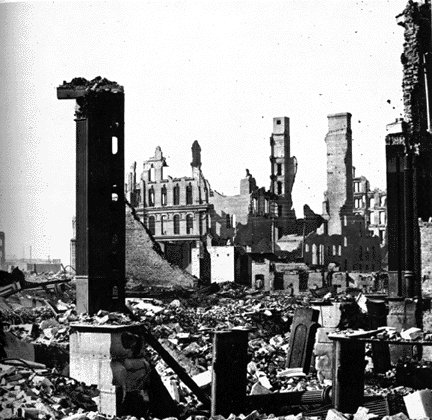
Chicago after the fire

Within the Moody–Sankey mission, Moody preached and Sankey sang. Late in 1871, mission work was interrupted by the Great Chicago Fire, which destroyed 18,000 buildings, killed around 300 people, and left a third of the city's population homeless. Sankey watched the conflagration from a small boat in which he rowed out into Lake Michigan. The fire destroyed Moody's church, and Sankey returned temporarily to New Castle. However, he soon received a message from Moody asking him to come back to Chicago and resume the partnership. He did so and worked with Moody in the revival of churches in Chicago, Springfield and elsewhere. In October 1872 Sankey moved his family permanently to Chicago.

==== British campaign 1873–1875 and aftermath ====
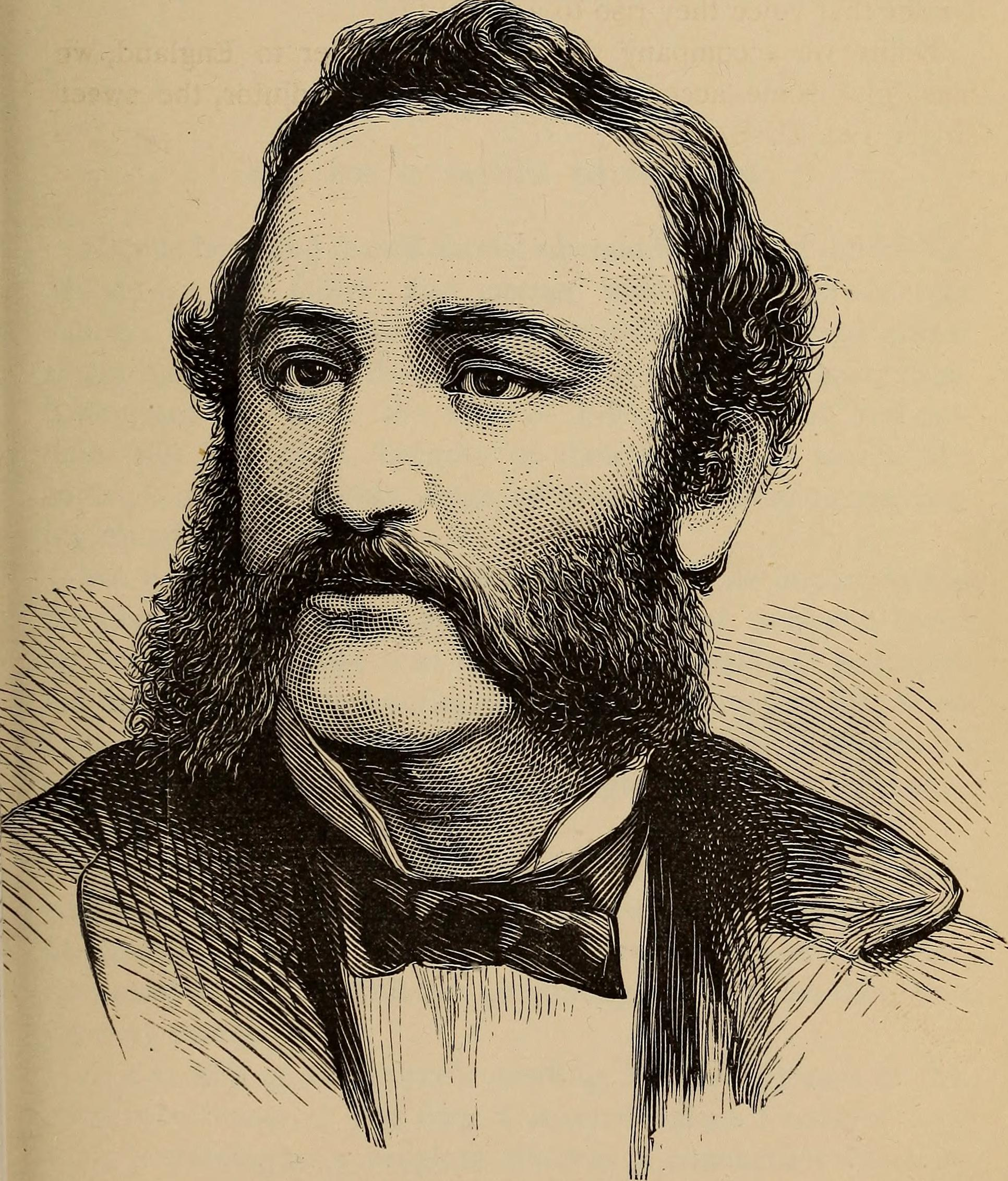
Sankey at the time of the first British tour

Moody made plans to visit the British Isles in 1873 for a series of missions. He did not initially intend to take Sankey as his musical associate, preferring the services of the more experienced gospel singers Philip Phillips or Philip Bliss. Neither was available, so Sankey was taken. The tour got off to a slow start; barely 50 people attended the first rally, held in York, and this congregation was unused to the kind of gospel songs – "human hymns" – that Sankey introduced. Gradually, however, the British public was won over, halls were filled, and Sankey's "singing the gospel" became a popular feature of the services. To familiarise the congregations with the words of new hymns by Bliss, Fanny Crosby and others, Sankey published a short collection of the favorite numbers, under the title Sacred Songs and Solos. The collection was much expanded in later editions, eventually comprising 1,200 pieces. While in Scotland, Sankey composed his first gospel song, a setting of Horatius Bonar's hymn "Yet There is Room". (Note: According to Betty Steele Everett's biography, Sankey had earlier composed a chorus to J.H. Stockton's hymn "Only Trust Him", while on the sea trip to Britain.) The tour extended over two years, with meetings in most of the main British cities. When it reached London, congregations included many of the most prominent in the land, including Queen Victoria, the Princess of Wales, and the statesman William Ewart Gladstone.

Moody and Sankey returned home in the summer of 1875, to considerable acclaim after their successful British tour, and quickly established themselves as the leading revivalists of their times. Beginning with a rally in Moody's hometown of Northfield, Massachusetts, (Note: Moody was born in Northfield on February 5, 1837.) revival meetings were held during the following years in towns and cities the length and breadth of the United States, with excursions over the borders into Canada and Mexico. Meetings in the southern states were subject to racial segregation. Concerning a meeting in Meridian, Mississippi, Sankey noted: "we have one side of the [tabernacle] for blacks. D.L. has them sing alone, sometimes just to show the white people how to sing".

==== Later campaigns ====
The campaign made a second visit to Britain in 1881. The schedule was similar to that which had been followed on the first British tour, involving mass rallies in a large number of cities. This time, the pair's popularity and renown assured them of full houses wherever they went. One innovation was the construction of a portable tabernacle, capable of seating up to 5,000 people, which was transported from city to city. Towards the end of the tour Sankey's voice broke down and he was forced to return to the United States, where he and his family bought a house in Brooklyn, New York. For the next few years, he spent his winters there and the summers with Moody, either in Northfield or on campaigns. A third British tour took place in 1891, involving meetings in 99 towns. Again, Sankey overstrained himself and had to return home early.

In 1893 Moody and Sankey conducted a major campaign in Chicago, as part of the World's Columbian Exposition. Once more, the strain on Sankey's voice was too great, causing his temporary withdrawal. But despite ill health he continued to work with Moody, at a lower degree of intensity, until the time of the latter's death in December 1899. Their final campaign together was in Kansas City, a month before Moody's death. As a tribute to his long-time partner, Sankey wrote and composed the hymn "Out of the Shadowlands" for Moody's funeral.

=== Final years and death ===
In 1898, accompanied by family and friends, Sankey traveled to Egypt and Palestine on an extended trip which, on the return journey, included visits to Constantinople, Athens and Rome. In Jerusalem, Sankey ascended the Tower of David, where he sang Psalm 121 to a bemused Ottoman guard. The following year, after Moody's death, he embarked on his final visit to Britain and addressed a meeting of 20,000 in London, but as the tour progressed his health failed him and he returned to his home in Brooklyn. He continued to do editorial work, but by 1903 he had lost his eyesight to glaucoma. Despite this, he managed to complete a book of memoirs, My Life and Sacred Songs, which was published in 1906. Sankey died at Brooklyn on August 13, 1908, just short of his 68th birthday. His funeral took place at the LaFayette Avenue Presbyterian Church, which he had joined in his final years, (Note: Sankey had been a lifelong Methodist. His transfer to the Presbyterians was not due to any dispute with his former church, but because his poor health meant that he had to attend a church near his home.) and he was buried in Brooklyn's Greenwood Cemetery. At Fanny Sankey's request a memorial window, depicting "The Ninety and Nine", was placed in New Castle's First Methodist Church; the window was retained when the church was rebuilt in the 1990s.

== Appraisal ==
=== Musical ministry ===
==== Singing ====
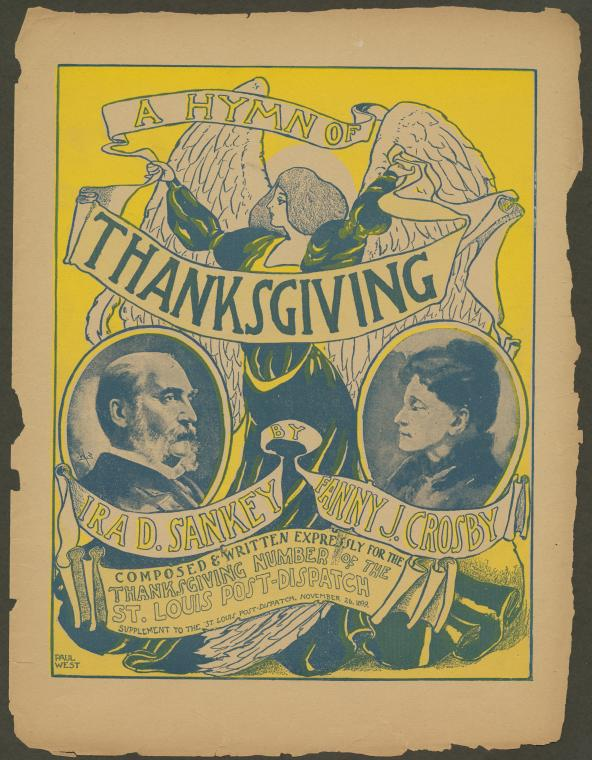
"A Hymn of Thanksgiving" sheet music cover - November 26, 1899

In Sankey's view, he and Moody were both preachers; the only difference, he said, was that "[Moody] reaches men's hearts with words that are spoken, while I reach them with words that are sung." Sankey lacked formal voice training; the only tuition that he received was likely during his attendance at a 12-week session run by George Frederick Root, Lowell Mason, and William Bradbury, which prepared potential music teachers and choirmasters for their work. Nevertheless, he possessed a sound vocal technique; a contemporary description refers to "an exceptionally strong baritone", while a newspaper review of the times wrote that "he expresses the gospel message with exquisite skill and pathos ... but the secret of Mr. Sankey's power lies not in his gift of the song but in the spirit of which the song is only the expression". According to Sankey: "Before I sing, I must feel, and the hymn must be of such kind as I know I can send home what I feel into the hearts of those who listen". His technique for communicating this feeling involved the clearest possible enunciation, with careful use of pauses for dramatic effect: "You've got to make them hear every word and see every picture ... Then you'll get that silence of death, that quiet before God".

For his solos, Sankey would accompany himself on a small portable reed organ. An important part of the song ministry was the congregational singing, always a significant feature of campaign meetings. Sankey chose hymns with accessible tunes that were easy to learn and insisted that the accompanying music be played softly, to emphasize the message of the words. Sankey's methods had a marked effect on church music and were widely adopted by later generations of revivalist singers.

In the secular world, not every listener was captivated by Sankey's singing style. A.N. Wilson, in his social history of the Victorian era, quotes a contemporary pamphlet from an anonymous "London Physician" which is dismissive of both Moody and Sankey. Having characterized Moody as a ranter and "a third-rate star", the writer goes on: "As for Mr. Sankey ... his voice is decidedly bad, and, like all worn-out singers he endeavors to conceal this by startling alternations of high and low notes". Against this judgment is that of a newspaper published towards the end of the first British tour: "Music in his hands is ... the handmaid of the gospel and the voice of the heart."

==== Composing ====
Sankey began to compose hymn tunes during the first Moody-Sankey tour of Britain in 1873–1875. On a few occasions he wrote his own words, but more commonly he used verses provided by well-known hymn writers. The "1200" version of Sacred Songs and Solos includes nearly 200 of Sankey's settings of hymns by writers such as Horatius Bonar, Fanny Crosby, Elizabeth C. Clephane, Robert Lowry, John Greenleaf Whittier, Frances Ridley Havergal and many others. These hymns include "The Ninety and Nine", "Beneath the Cross of Jesus", "Hiding in Thee", "A Shelter in the Time of Storm" and "While the days are going by".

Sankey's settings are eminently recognizable, characteristic features being simple melodies combined with strong and vigorous rhythms that reflected the popular music of the time, and which according to the British poet John Betjeman, invoked "that well-known principle of denying the devil all the best tunes". His compositional method was heavily dependent upon what he termed "inspiration"; he carried a notebook in which he would jot down snatches of melody that came to him during the day's activities, and would develop them later when time allowed. Sometimes he would improvise a melody; one of his best-known hymns, "The Ninety and Nine", was composed in this way. He found Elizabeth Clephane's poem in a newspaper while traveling on a train in Scotland during the first British tour. At the meeting that evening, when Moody requested that he sing, "I had nothing suitable in mind ... At this moment I seemed to hear a voice saying "Sing the hymn you found on the train":

I lifted my heart in prayer, asking God to help me so to sing so that the people might hear and understand. Laying my hands upon the organ I struck the chord of A flat and began to sing. Note by note the tune was given, which has not changed from that day to this. As the singing ceased a great sigh seemed to go up from the meeting, and I knew that my song had reached the hearts of my Scottish audience.

==== Publishing ====
The publishing successes in Britain with Sacred Songs and Solos prompted Sankey to make a similar venture in the United States. In 1876, in collaboration with Bliss, he published a gospel song collection Gospel Hymns and Sacred Songs, consisting of 131 numbers. Over the next 15 years, working with various associates, he produced five supplements to this work, and a complete edition of all six parts in 1894, this last containing 794 numbers. These collections, which included the hymns of Bliss, Crosby and many other writers, were very successful commercially. In 1895 Sankey assumed the presidency of Biglow & Main, America's leading publisher of Sunday school music.

=== Legacy ===
Sankey's career as a gospel singer contradicts the commonly held assumption that gospel music originated within the black communities in the southern states. Rather, as Mel R. Wilhoit points out, its source is found "in the context of Northern, urban, white revivalism of the nineteenth century" in which Sankey was a principal figure. Although new musical idioms developed in the later 20th century and subsequently, Sankey's influence persists, particularly in southern evangelical churches, well into the 21st century. The revivalist model that Moody and Sankey introduced established a paradigm for the conduct of rallies and services in evangelical churches for generations.

From the sales of his various hymn collections, which totaled over 50 million copies, Sankey acquired a considerable fortune, much of which he used for benefactions. These included a new YMCA building in New Castle, a building plot for the erection of a new Methodist Episcopal Church there, and large donations to the Moody schools in Northfields.

The centenary of Sankey's birth was celebrated in New Castle in 1940. Choirs from over 30 churches participated, and Sankey's portable organ was used as accompaniment. The 150th anniversary of his birth in 1990 was also marked in New Castle, where massed choirs performed a retrospective of Sankey's songs. In 1980 Sankey was honored by induction into the Gospel Music Hall of Fame.

== Notes and references ==
=== Sources ===
- Betjeman, John (2008). Sweet Songs of Zion. London: Hodder & Stoughton. ISBN 978-0340-96388-3.
- Everett, Betty Steele (1999). Ira Sankey: First Gospel Singer. Fort Washington, PA: Christian Literature Crusade. ISBN 0-87508-471-0.
- Hall, Timothy L. (2003). American Religious Leaders. New York: Facts on File Inc. ISBN 0-8160-4534-8.
- Kurian, George Thomas; Lamport, Mark A. (eds) (2016). Encyclopedia of Christianity in the United States, Volume 5. Lanham, MD: Rowman & Littlefield. ISBN 978-1-44224-431-3.
- McLoughlin, William G. (2004). Modern Revivalism: Charles Grandison Finney to Billy Graham. Eugene, OR: Wipf and Stock. ISBN 1-59244-976-X.
- McNeill, William K., ed. (2010). Encyclopedia of American Gospel Music. New York and London: Routledge. ISBN 978-0-415-87569-1.
- Nicholls, David, ed. (1998). The Cambridge History of American Music. Cambridge: Cambridge University Press. ISBN 978-0-52145-429-2.
- Osbeck, Kenneth W. (1985). 101 More Hymn Stories. Grand Rapids, Michigan: Kregel Publications. ISBN 978-0-82543-420-4. "Ira D. Sankey -wikipedia."
- Sankey, Ira D., ed. (1900). Sacred Songs & Solos (revised and enlarged, 1200 pieces with music). London: Morgan and Scott. OCLC 23175485. (year of publication approximate) unpaginated
- Sankey, Ira D. (1906). My Life and Sacred Songs. London: Hodder and Stoughton. OCLC 220735287.
