= Joseph P. Knapp =

- Born: May 14, 1864; Brooklyn, New York, U.S.
- Died: January 30, 1951 (aged 86); New York City, U.S.
- Education: Columbia College of Columbia University
- Occupations: publisher and philanthropist
- Known for: This Week; Ducks Unlimited; J. P. Knapp Foundation
- Spouses: Sylvia Teresa Kepner (m. 1886; div. 1903) Elizabeth Laing McIlwaine (m. 1902; died 1922) Margaret Elizabeth Rutledge (m. 1923)
- Children: Claire Antoinette Knapp (1889–1959); Joseph Fairchild Knapp (1892–1952)
- Parent(s): Joseph Fairchild Knapp and Phoebe Knapp

Joseph Palmer Knapp (May 14, 1864 – January 30, 1951) was an American publisher and philanthropist. He was chairman of the board and principal shareholder of the Crowell-Collier Publishing Company. Knapp has also been credited with the invention of the multi-color six-cylinder press.

He was the son of Joseph Fairchild and Phoebe Palmer Knapp. His father was a past president of the Metropolitan Life Insurance Company and his mother was a hymn writer, credited with over 500 hymns, most notably "Blessed Assurance" with Fanny Crosby.

He was educated at Columbia College, matriculating with the class of 1884, but left after a year to become a member of the board in his father's company.

In 1892, Knapp founded the American Lithographic Co., which became a leading printer of Sunday magazines for newspapers. (The company later became Publication Corporation, which eventually owned a number of Knapp publishing properties.)

Knapp published the Associated Sunday Magazine from 1903 to 1905.

In 1906, Knapp and partner George Hazen purchased the Crowell Publishing Company of Springfield, Ohio, incorporating it in New Jersey. Crowell published the family magazines Farm & Fireside and Woman's Home Companion.

Knapp's Every Week, published between 1915 and 1918, reached a circulation of more than 550,000.

In 1919, Knapp acquired P.F. Collier & Son, a New York-based publisher of books and magazines, including Collier's. He merged P.F. Collier & Son with the Crowell Publishing Company in 1939, and served as chairman of the merged firm, the Crowell-Collier Publishing Company, until 1946.

Knapp was publisher of the New York Herald Tribune Sunday Magazine in 1935 when he changed its name and began to syndicate it to other newspapers as the Sunday supplement This Week. In the early 1950s, it accompanied 37 Sunday newspapers. (After Knapp's death, at its peak in 1963, This Week was distributed with the Sunday editions of 42 newspapers for a total circulation of 14.6 million.)

Knapp owned a hunting lodge in North Carolina known as Mackay Island. This property is now national wildlife refuge.

== Philanthropy ==
Knapp was interested in game bird conservation, and in 1937 founded the More Game Birds in America Foundation (with others including J. P. Morgan), which today is known as Ducks Unlimited.

He contributed greatly to the Currituck County Schools in North Carolina and to the University of North Carolina. Currituck County dedicated one of their public schools to Knapp. This school is currently the J.P. Knapp Early College High School, which was founded in 2008.
