= Phoebe Knapp =

American hymnwriter

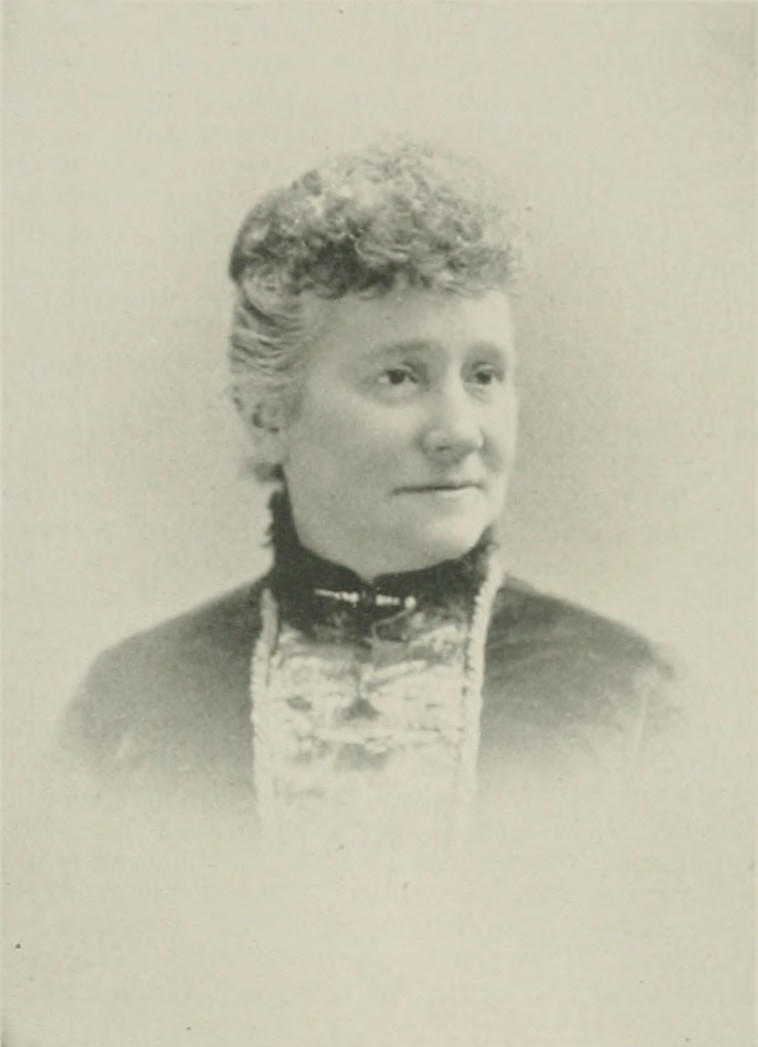
- Phoebe Palmer Knapp from A Woman of the Century
- Born: Phoebe Palmer; March 9, 1839; New York City, U.S.
- Died: July 10, 1908 (aged 69); Poland, Maine
- Occupations: Hymnwriter, Philanthropist, Musician
- Known for: "Assurance" for Fanny Crosby's lyrics Blessed Assurance
- Spouse: Joseph Fairchild Knapp
- Children: Francis D. Knapp (June 23, 1857–July 7, 1857); Antoinette Knapp (c. 1862–1948); Joseph Palmer Knapp (1864 - 1951)
- Parent(s): Walter C. Palmer and Phoebe Palmer

Phoebe Knapp (née Palmer; March 9, 1839 – July 10, 1908) was an American hymnwriter, musician and Methodist philanthropist. A wealthy society woman in New York, she entertained prominent figures at evening musicales, supported philanthropist efforts organized by women and was influential at John Street Methodist Episcopal Church as a composer of children's hymns. Many of her hymn tunes were set to texts written by women with whom she collaborated, including Fanny Crosby. She composed the tunes for over five hundred hymns, some of which became widely circulated including "Blessed Assurance."

== Life ==
Knapp was born in New York City in 1839 to Walter C. Palmer and Phoebe (Worrall) Palmer, who was prominent in the Holiness movement within Methodist Christianity. She spent her early life in Brooklyn and became noted at a young age for her singing and composition. Two of her early tunes were later published in Joseph Hillman's 1868 collection of hymns, The Revivalist, as tunes to texts by her mother.

At age 16, she married Joseph Fairchild Knapp, a co-founder of the Metropolitan Life Insurance Company and its second president. Together, they were prominent members of John Street Methodist Episcopal Church's Sunday-school where Phoebe taught and composed music for the school and where Joseph was superintendent. During this time, her husband copyrighted all of the tunes she composed as she wrote them. Out of her composition efforts for the Sunday-school, Knapp wrote two children's hymnals made primarily of her own compositions: Notes of Joy for the Sabbath School (1869) and Bible School Songs (1873). Both books were later published by her son, Joseph Palmer Knapp, who also published much of her other music. In addition to their volunteer efforts, the Knapps also funded a pipe organ for the Sunday-school.

Outside of their contributions in the church, the Knapps were prominent in the New York social scene. They regularly held evening musicales at their residence, Knapp Mansion, where they hosted leading figures such as abolitionist Harriet Stowe, multiple generals and four American presidents, including Ulysses Grant, Grover Cleveland and Benjamin Harrison. The music room these events were held in contained Knapp's own pipe organ. Being herself an organist and a trained singer, Knapp frequently performed at the musicales she hosted. She also volunteered, along with hymnwriter Fanny Crosby, at the Five Points Mission philanthropic center in the New York slums.

After the death of her husband in 1891, Knapp moved to the Savoy Hotel near Central Park. Having inherited control over her husband's wealth, she financially supported various charitable organizations. She took an interest in the International Sunshine Society and was on the board of directors for the club. Nearing the end of her life, she hosted several of the club's conventions. Knapp also hosted concerts from her apartment where she particularly showcased singers. Her apartment boasted a pipe organ, which was claimed at the time to be "the largest organ in the world in a private home."

Phoebe Knapp died in Poland Springs, Maine in 1908 and was buried at Green-Wood Cemetery in New York. She was noted in her time for her popularity and was remembered on the day of her death by The Brooklyn Daily Times as a woman "well known in Brooklyn."

== Legacy ==
Phoebe Knapp was one of the most prolific composers of Sunday-school hymns and she wrote over 500 hymn tunes. One-hundred of her compositions were published in her first hymnal, Notes of Joy for the Sabbath School (1869). Knapp's second hymnal, Bible School Songs (1873) also contains some of her own compositions, including an early publication of "Blessed Assurance." "Blessed Assurance," with lyrics written by Fanny Crosby, became one of Knapp's most popular hymns after being published internationally by Ira D. Sankey in 1887 and has now been published in over 1300 hymnals. In addition to hymn tunes, Knapp also wrote some parlor songs, her most successful being "Watching for Pa," and a cantata, "The Prince of Peace."

Knapp was one of the earliest composers of Sunday-school hymns and her compositions participated in the development of the 19th century gospel hymn style from Sunday-school songs. The direct texts and tunes of her hymns were characteristic of the style that women hymnwriters in 19th century America found useful in their philanthropic and evangelistic work. Knapp often collaborated with such women to write hymns, writing the tune while another writer wrote the lyrics. Among those she collaborated with were Mary D. James, Josephine Pollard, Mary A. Kidder and particularly, Fanny Crosby, who was Knapp's personal friend. Knapp also collaborated with Methodist bishops John Vincent and Matthew Simpson on Bible School Songs (1873).

Knapp's music was noted for its popularity by her contemporaries. Notes of Joy (1869) was said to have "had a wide circulation and great popularity." "The Prince of Peace" was claimed by Eva Munson Smith to have "had an immense sale for Christmas holiday entertainment." Bishop Matthew Simpson wrote in his foreword to Notes of Joy that Knapp's hymns were published because "they have been listened to and admired, and having been repeatedly urged by many friends, she has at length committed them to the Press."

== Works ==
Below is a partial listing of Phoebe Knapp's hymns with their respective lyricists:

Hymn Title	Lyricist
"Blessed Assurance"	Fanny Crosby
"Open the Gates of the Temple"	Fanny Crosby
"Nearer the Cross"	Fanny Crosby
"Wonderful Savior"	Fanny Crosby
"Come and Worship"	Fanny Crosby
"God Ever Near"	Fanny Crosby
"Press On"	Fanny Crosby
"Sabbath Closing Hymn"	Fanny Crosby
"The Lord is King"	Fanny Crosby
"Welcome"	Fanny Crosby
"Our Sabbath Home"	Fanny Crosby
"Blessed Bible"	Phoebe Palmer
"The Cleansing Wave"	Phoebe Palmer
"Welcome to Glory"	Phoebe Palmer
"Children, Lo! Your Savior"	Phoebe Palmer
"Love's Redeeming Story"	Phoebe Palmer
"Everlasting Love"	Mary D. James
"My Spirit Soul and Body"	Mary D. James
"Jesus' Jewels"	Mary A. Kidder
"Our Gratitude"	Marry A. Kidder
"What Have I Done?"	Josephine Pollard
"Anniversary Hymn"	Josephine Pollard
"He Has Come"	Mrs. J. H. Knowles
"Jesus Christ is Passing By"	J. Denham Smith
"Swift the Days are Onward Flying"	William O. Bourne
"Cling Close to the Rock"	Rev. Alfred Taylor
"Onward Yet!"	herself
"Work and Wait"	herself
"I am Jesus' Little Lamb"	herself
"Dear Jesus, Hear Me"	herself
"I want to be like Jesus"	herself
Loving Jesus, Gentle Lamb	herself
