= Crowell-Collier Publishing Company =

American publisher

- Status: defunct (1973)
- Founded: 1877
- Founder: Phineas P. Mast
- Successor: Macmillan Inc.
- Country of origin: U.S.
- Headquarters location: Springfield, Ohio, later New York City
- Distribution: National
- Publication types: Magazines, Reference books
- Owners: P. P. Mast (1877–1898); John S. Crowell (1898–1906); Joseph P. Knapp and George Hazen (1906–?); Armand G. Erpf (1956–?)

Crowell-Collier Publishing Company was an American publisher that owned the popular magazines Collier's, Woman's Home Companion and The American Magazine. Crowell's subsidiary, P.F. Collier and Son, published Collier's Encyclopedia, the Harvard Classics, and general interest books.

The company was founded in 1877 in Springfield, Ohio, by agricultural tool manufacturer P. P. Mast with a single magazine, Farm & Fireside (later the Country Home), to sell farm tools and implements. By 1881, Mast had relinquished control to John S. Crowell who expanded the company by purchasing Home Companion (later changing the name to Woman's Home Companion).

After P. P. Mast's death in 1898, Crowell obtained control of the company and established it as the Crowell Publishing Company. Crowell Publishing expanded its magazine holdings with The American Magazine in 1911 and the weekly Collier's in 1919. At one point Collier's weekly had over 1.25 million subscribers.

After shuttering the magazine operations in 1956, the Crowell-Collier Publishing Company merged with the American Macmillan Company in 1960 and became a large educational company with subsidiaries for books, textbooks, correspondence schools and other educational tools and materials. The company officially changed its name to Macmillan, Inc. in 1973.

== Early history ==
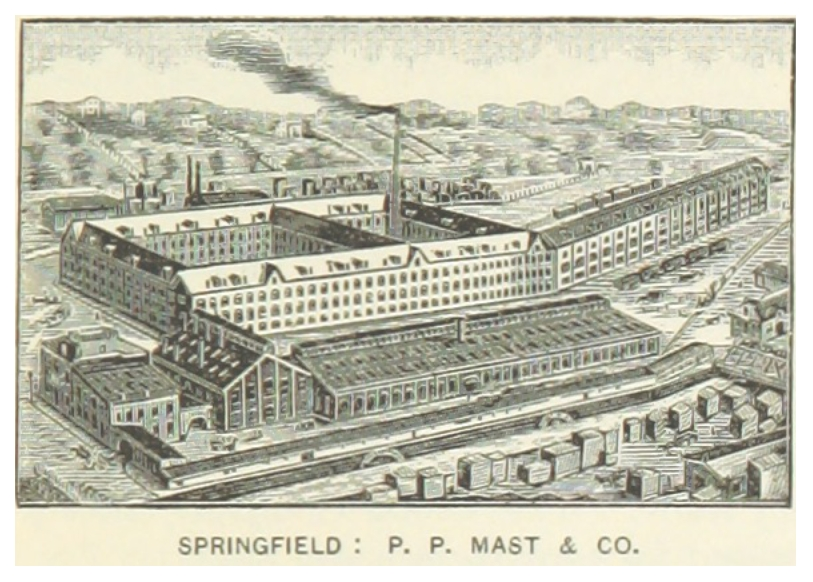
P. P. Mast and Company, Springfield, Ohio

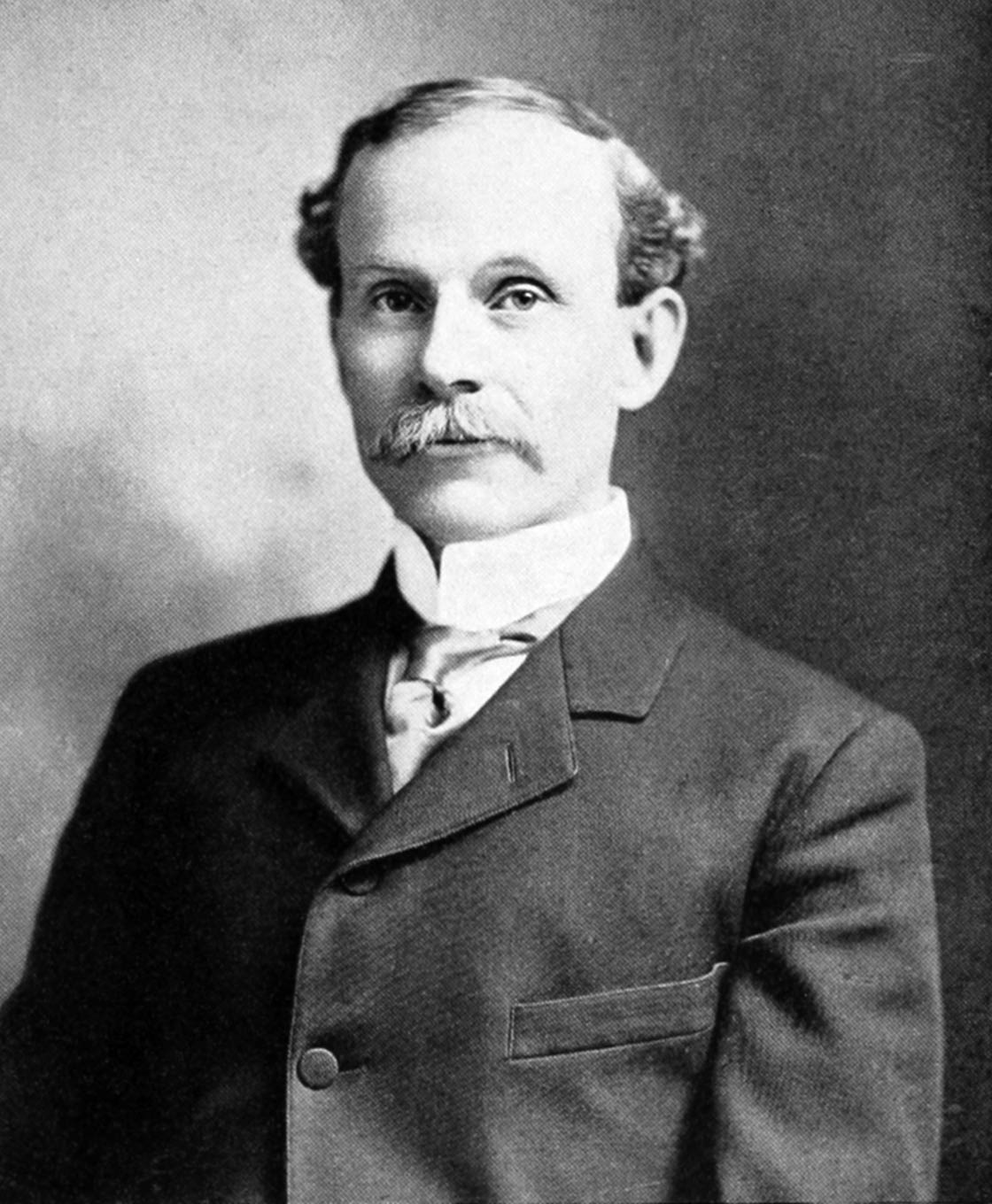
John S. Crowell

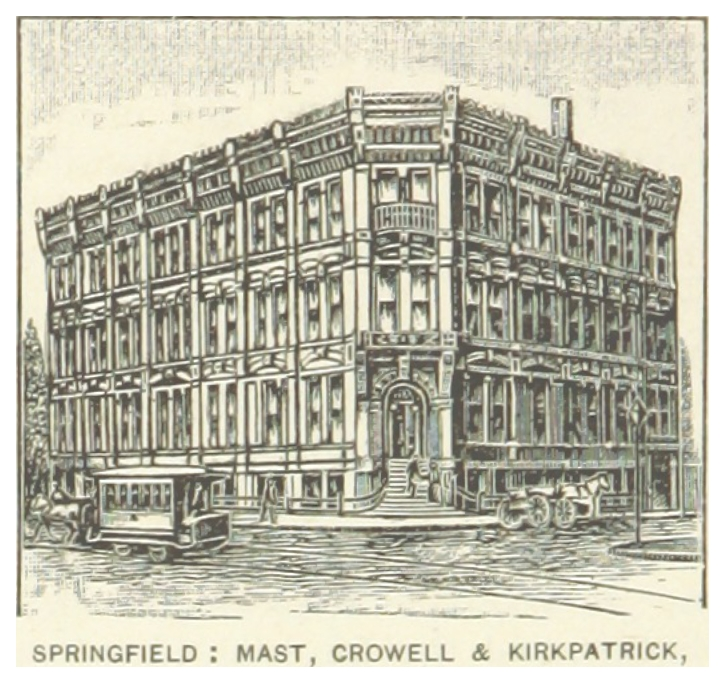
Mast, Crowell and Kirkpatrick Publishers (1891)

The Crowell-Collier Publishing Company had its roots in the agricultural trade of the 19th century. Industrialist Phineas P. Mast, the owner of P. P. Mast, manufactured farm and agricultural tools, and he wanted a magazine to promote his products. Mast made wind engines, pumps, plows and mowers in Springfield, Ohio. Mast hired John S. Crowell away from the successful Home and Farm of Louisville in 1877 to manage the new bi-monthly farm journal called Farm & Fireside. By the 1890s, Farm & Fireside maintained a circulation of over half a million. Mast relinquished his role as acting executive in 1879, but he stayed on as an investor. Crowell along with T.J. Kirkpatrick (who was Mast's nephew) then changed the name of the publishing house to Mast, Crowell and Kirkpatrick Publishers.

The publishers soon expanded from the one magazine into other markets. They constructed the Farm and Fireside building in Springfield, Ohio, in 1881. In 1883, they purchased the Home Companion magazine from a Harvey & Finn of Cleveland, Ohio to meet the growing demand for content aimed at women. They bought Youth's Home Library, a similar paper that had been published in Boston, and merged it with their youth-oriented publication Our Young People. They then changed the name of the three merged periodicals back to the title Home Companion, a general family magazine. By 1890 the magazine's subscription had reached 100,000. The Companion had a number of names but was changed to Woman's Home Companion in 1896. By the 1890s, Farm & Fireside was also publishing regional editions of the periodical. After the death of P. P. Mast in 1898, the company changed its name to Crowell and Kirkpatrick Publishers.

== 20th century ==
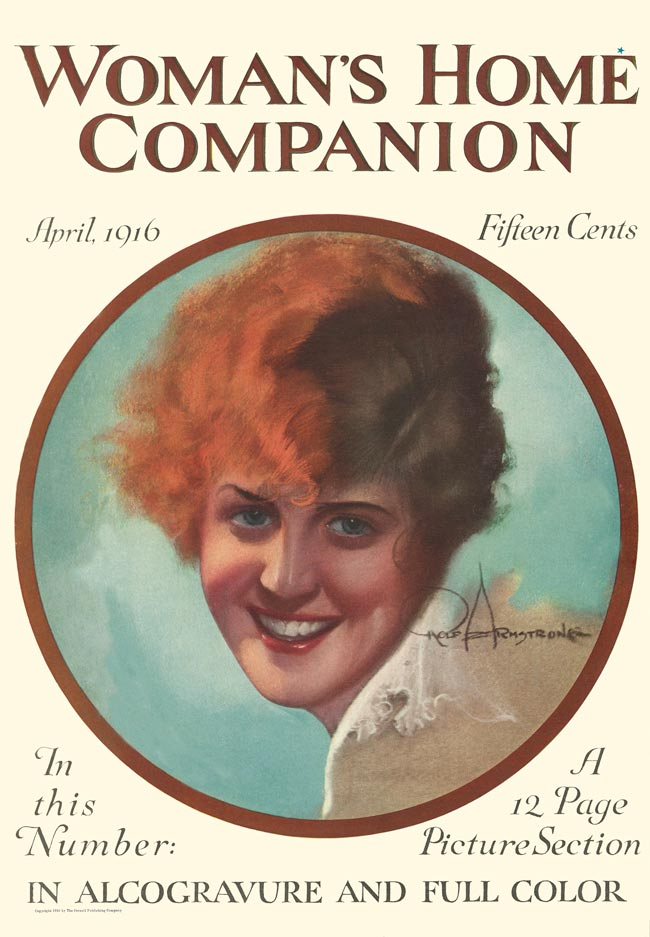
Woman's Home Companion for April 1916

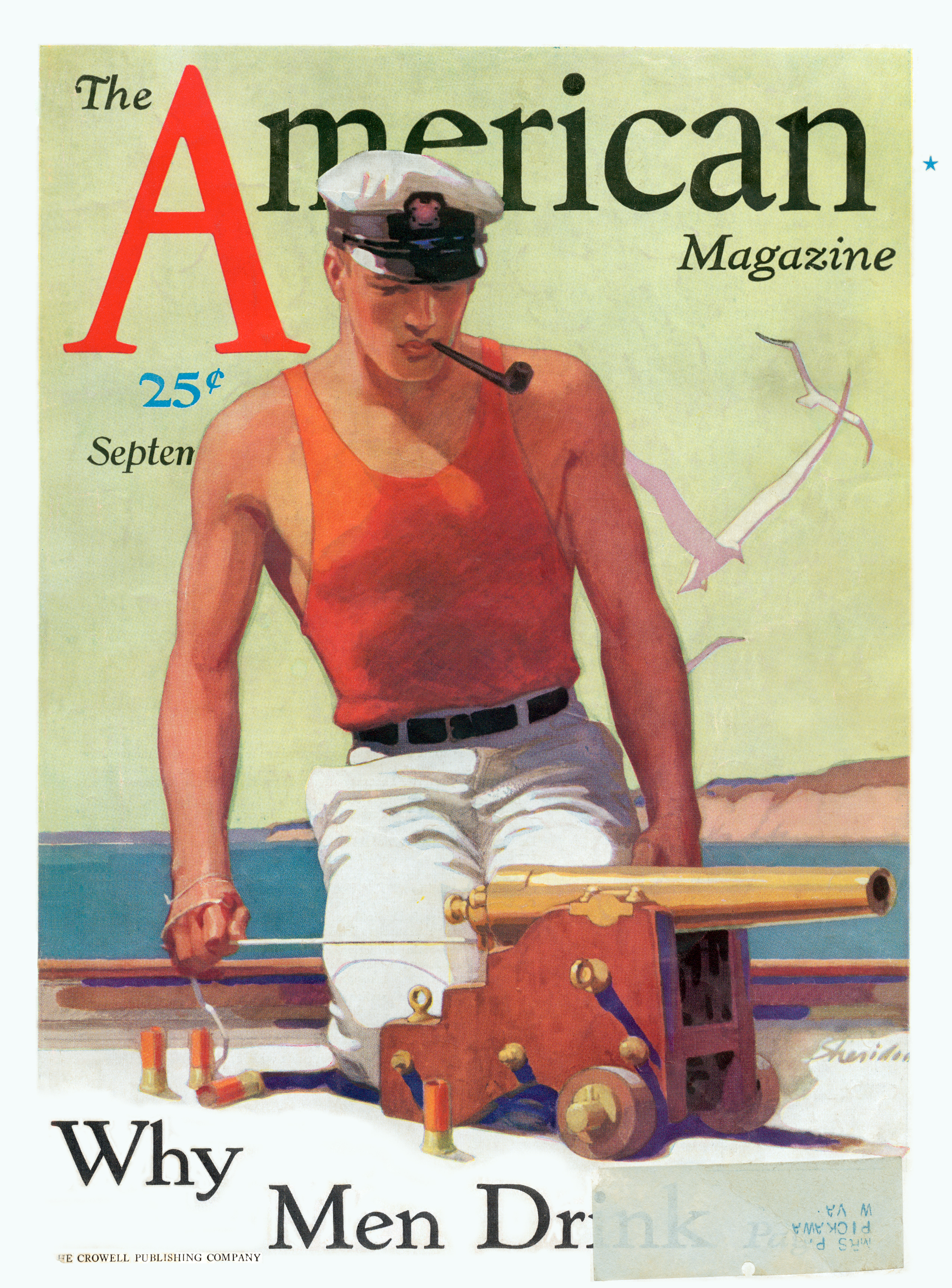
The American Magazine in 1931

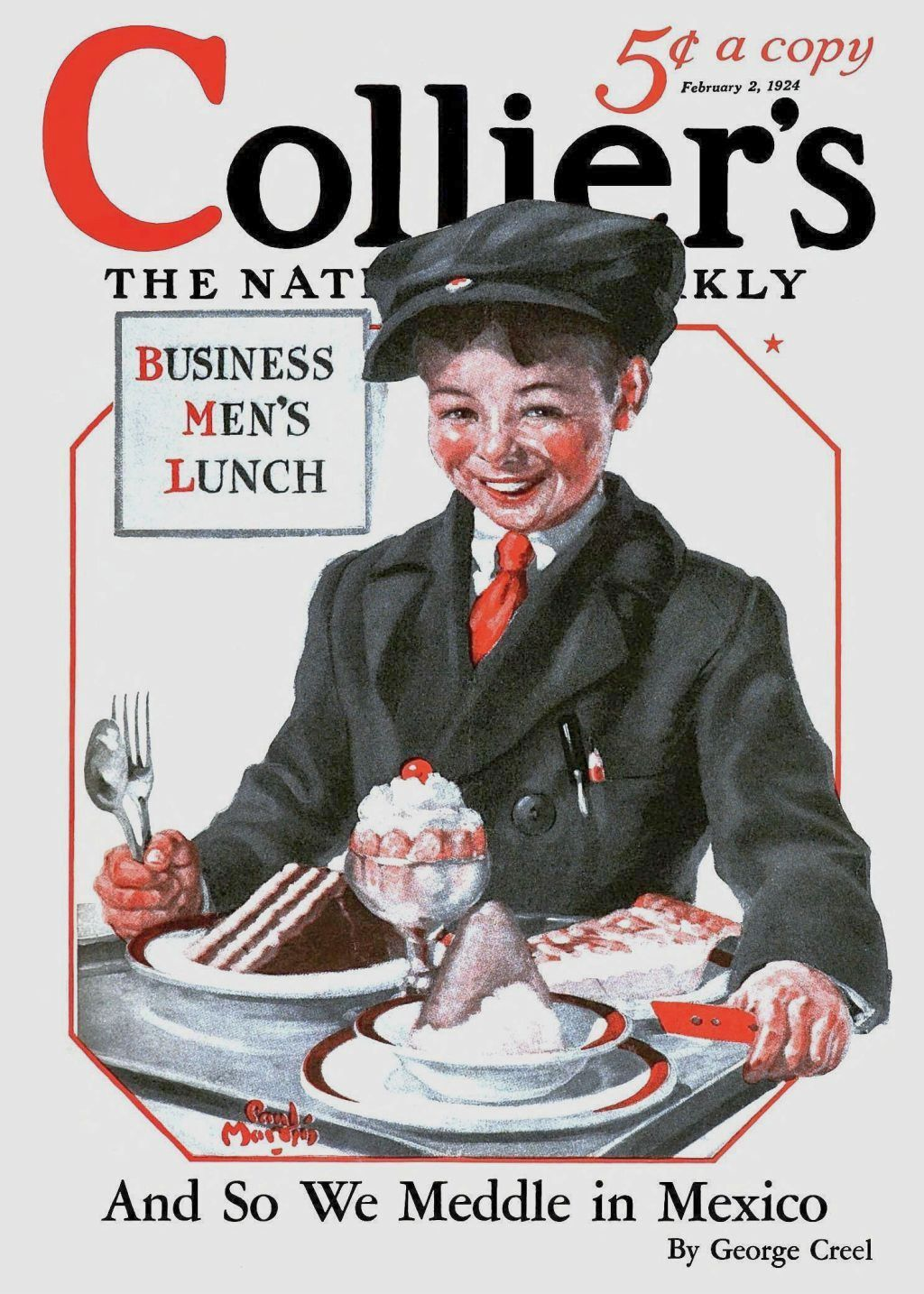
Collier's in February 1924

As the 20th century began, the company changed hands again and moved into mainstream magazine publishing. P. P. Mast died in 1898 (leaving an estate of a million and a half dollars). In 1902, John S. Crowell obtained Kirkpatrick's interests and established it as the Crowell Publishing Company. In 1906, Crowell turned around and sold his interest in the company to Joseph P. Knapp and George Hazen of New York, who incorporated in New Jersey and kept the name Crowell Publishing Company. The new company maintained offices in New York City in addition to Springfield, Ohio.

Crowell Publishing Company lost a 1908 appeal before the Board of United States General Appraisers and was assessed countervailing duties on paper imported from Canada.

=== 1910s and acquisition of Collier's and other periodicals ===
Crowell Publishing acquired The American Magazine in 1911 from the Phillips Publishing Company. The magazine had muckraking roots but with the decline of muckraking journalism it had turned into a general interest magazine. However, an article in the New York Times noted that "the purchase of the American Magazine by Crowell Publishing Company meant that 'the interests' were bent on swallowing up the muckrakers." They pointed to the fact that one of the heavy stockholders in the Crowell firm was Thomas W. Lamont who was also a partner of the newly formed J. P. Morgan & Company. Cleveland Moffett, a known muckraking journalist was quoted, "we are up against the powers of darkness. The right of free speech in America is in jeopardy. They are trying to muzzle the magazines. Several magazines have changed hands recently. They have come under the control of interests, and in each of them the muckraking features will cease. Muckraking, in spite of its name, is a power in this country, standing as it does to promote good citizenship." However, a second New York Times article about the acquisition stated that writers such as Ida Tarbell, Peter F. Dunne, and William Allen White were pleased with the opportunity. A spokesman from Phillips said that "instead of reaching 300,000 readers, we can now reach 3,000,000 readers through our new allies in the publication field. We ourselves were afraid the Trusts were behind the proposition before we looked into it, but all the magazines we affiliate with are insurgent like ourselves, and controlled by persons of insurgent sympathies."

That same year, several magazine publishers including Crowell were accused of conspiring to keep up magazine prices through the Periodical Clearing House. According to John Wood, a magazine man whose business had been severely impacted, the Periodical Clearing House was organized by law clerks and employees of the magazines. Wood claimed that ruinous fines had impacted his ability to sell subscriptions. At the same time libraries in the Central Western and Western states complained that the clearing house caused the cessation of club rates on magazines to libraries.

In 1919, the Crowell Publishing Company bought the P.F. Collier and Son publishing firm. This acquisition included the general interest magazine, Collier's the National Weekly, and P.F. Collier's well-established book publishing business. 11] Collier's the National Weekly had roots in muckraking journalism and had one of the largest magazine subscriber bases, with around one million weekly subscriptions.[5] P.F. Collier's book-publishing arm published six million books a year, including popular and serious literature, reference books, and encyclopedias.[5] P.F. Collier and Son was a pioneer in the subscription book business, whereby the company made it possible for customers of modest means to acquire fine literature and reference books, and pay over time with small monthly payments. Crowell Publishing operated P.F. Collier and Son as a subsidiary.

=== 1920s ===
By 1924, the weekly circulation of Collier's had grown to 1,250,000. Crowell moved its print operations to Springfield, Ohio, because of "excessive postage involved in mailing from a seaboard city under wartime postal rates". The editorial and business departments remained in New York.

=== 1930s ===
In 1930 Farm & Fireside magazine changed its name to The Country Home. Also in 1930, the Crowell Publishing Company and P. F. Collier and Sons were sued for libel by R.B. Creager, a Republican National Committeeman for Texas. Creager sought $500,000 in damages after an article titled "High-Handed and Hell-Bent" appeared in Collier's Weekly. The article by Owen P. White covered a political situation on the Mexican border in Hidalgo County. The jury returned a verdict for Crowell Publishing.

In 1939, Crowell Publishing merged the New York operations and changed the company name to The Crowell-Collier Publishing Co. That same year, The Country Home was discontinued.

=== 1940s ===
In 1940, the FTC charged the publishing company and its officers and directors of the corporation with misleading sale methods and representations.

During World War II, Crowell-Collier sponsored publication of a magazine for servicemen called Victory.

In 1946, the Vanderbilt mansion at 640 Fifth Avenue at Fifty-First Street in New York City was razed and replaced with a 19-story office building built by Metropolitan Life Insurance Company, another company with strong ties to Joseph P. Knapp, as the new headquarters for the Crowell-Collier Publishing Company.

in 1949, P.F. Collier and Son published Collier's Encyclopedia, an entirely new, 20 volume work, with the first volumes available in 1949 and all volumes published by 1951. With Encyclopedia Americana and Encyclopædia Britannica, Collier's Encyclopedia became one of the three major English-language general encyclopedias.

=== 1950s magazine closures and book profits ===
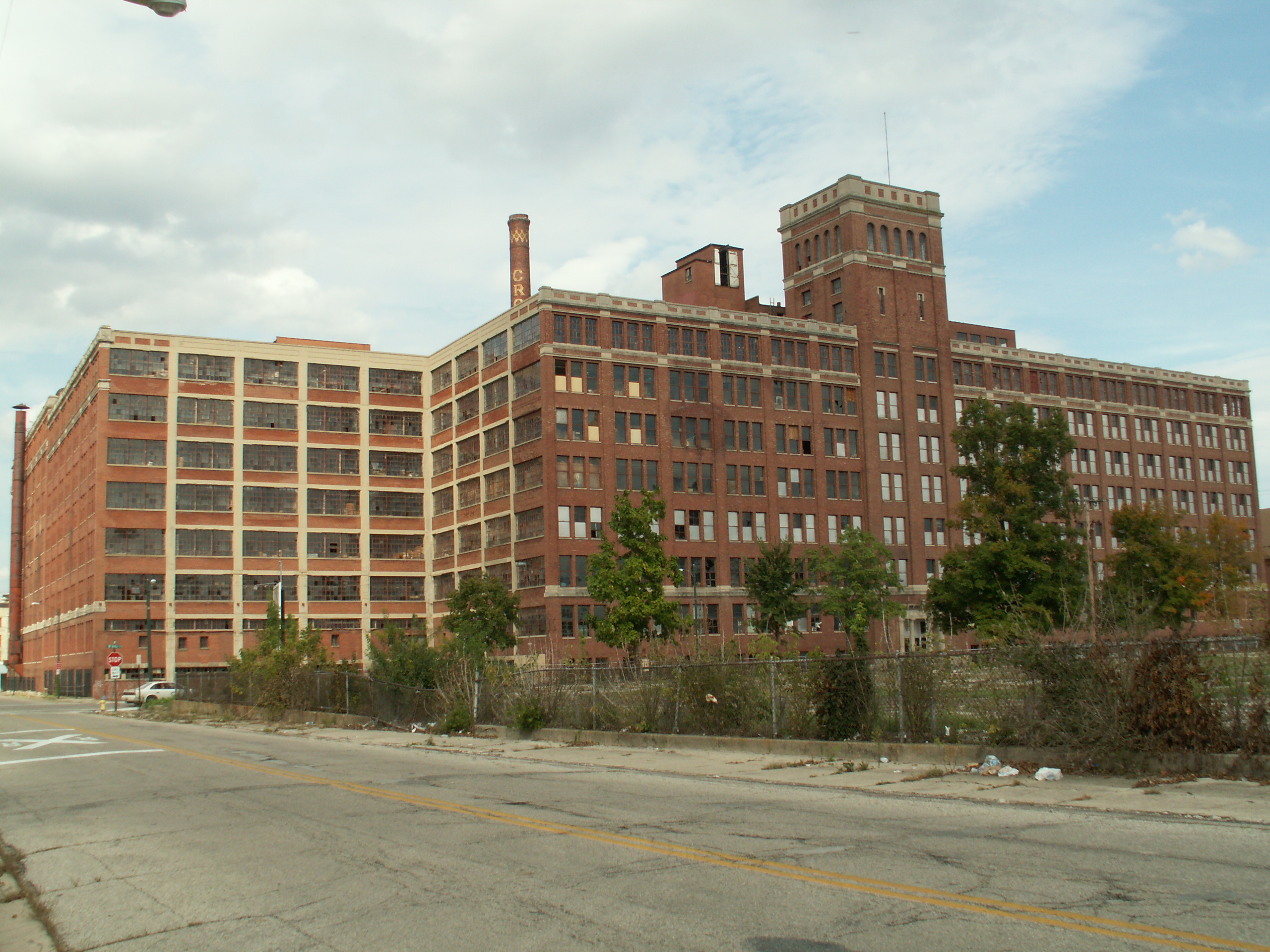
Shown in 2011, the Crowell-Collier building in Springfield, Ohio, was partially demolished in 2014. In July 2019 the city approved a permit for demolishing all of the remaining Crowell-Collier buildings, which once occupied 900,000 square feet.

In the late 1940s and up to the mid-1950s, Crowell-Collier's magazines enjoyed healthy subscription numbers, over 4 million subscribers for both Collier's and Woman's Home Companion. However, declining advertising revenues, as advertisers moved from magazines to television, and increased manufacturing and delivery costs, led to heavy losses. In 1953, Crowell-Collier named a former editor of the San Francisco Chronicle, Paul C. Smith, as its president, and later, as chairman, with a mission to save the ailing magazines. Nevertheless, in 1956, Crowell-Collier's magazines lost over $7 million. By December 1956, the company discontinued The American Magazine, Collier's, and Woman's Home Companion. The company also closed its Springfield, Ohio plant, which at one point had employed more than 2,000 people. The magazine closings shocked both publishers and readers. Many in the magazine field deemed it "a foolish and impetuous move", but as the company moved to focus on publishing books and educational materials, the move was seen as shrewd and far-visioned.

Even as Crowell-Collier closed its magazines, Collier's Encyclopedia was proving highly profitable for P.F. Collier and Son. Under the leadership of P.F. Collier and Son's president, John G. Ryan, sales of Collier's Encyclopedia increased substantially during the 1950s, rising from 46,374 sets in 1953 to 110,688 sets in 1957. In 1956, John G. Ryan reported a net profit of 20% of on $25 million in sales revenue. supplying the revenue that kept Crowell-Collier solvent as it suffered huge losses from its failing magazine business.

In 1957, outside investors seized full control of Crowell-Collier and installed a new chairman, a paper bag company executive with no prior publishing experience. He pressured P.F. Collier and Son to loosen its sales practices and customer credit standards, and to cut Collier's Encyclopedia's editorial budget. John G. Ryan demurred at abandoning his successful business model and continued generating record profits, including a 20% increase in the first quarter of 1959. Nevertheless, on April 2, 1959, the Crowell-Collier chairman fired Ryan and assumed personal direction of P.F. Collier and Son.

Ryan's removal had significant consequences. At a highly publicized April 1959 meeting with Crowell-Collier shareholders, the chairman proved unable to comment on any aspect of company operations. Ryan was soon hired as president of a subsidiary of Grolier Incorporated, publisher of the Encyclopedia Americana. Numerous sales and administrative managers quit P.F. Collier and Son to join Ryan. In December 1960, Crowell-Collier merged with P.F. Collier and Son, ending the weakened subsidiary's 85-year existence. Crowell-Collier assumed the liquidated firm's publishing, editorial, and highly profitable sales financing activities. A new subsidiary, P.F. Collier, Inc., was formed, but solely as a sales organization. P.F. Collier, Inc. expanded sales of Collier's Encyclopedia during the 1960s, but deceptive sales practices, encouraged by the Crowell-Collier chairman, ultimately led to a Federal Trade Commission complaint against the company, and crippling regulatory restrictions on its door-to-door encyclopedia sales.

=== 1960s and expansion as educational publisher ===
With profits from sales of Collier's Encyclopedia enabling Crowell-Collier to recover financially from its magazine losses, new opportunities arose. Under the prodding of Loeb, Rhoades & Co. senior partner, and Crowell-Collier director, Armand G. Erpf, Crowell-Collier used its encyclopedia sales earnings for a program of mergers and acquisitions. Leaving behind its roots in magazine publishing, it now focused on the growing market for education produced by the baby boom in the United States. Sales continued to surge for reference books, textbooks, and encyclopedias In 1962, the company published a new, 24-volume edition of Collier's Encyclopedia.

=== Merger with Macmillan ===
In December 1959, Crowell-Collier acquired 29 percent of Macmillan Company which published fiction, non-fiction, textbooks, reference books, religious books and children's books. By August 1960, Crowell-Collier held a 52.8 percent interest in Macmillan, and on December 30, 1960, the companies merged.

Macmillan was once the American division of the British Macmillan Publishers (opened in 1869) and had been run by generations of the Brett family who eventually took over the operation of the company from the British in 1896 (British Macmillan Publishers kept its stake in the American operation until 1951). Macmillan published some notable authors including Jack London, Margaret Mitchell, and Winston Churchill.

By 1960, the majority of Macmillan's sales came from textbooks and for Macmillan the merger meant access to cash and capital to grow their textbook market. Crowell-Collier ran Macmillan as a subsidiary but in 1965 Crowell-Collier officially changed its name to Crowell Collier & Macmillan, Inc. Publishing was dropped from the company name to reflect its broadened scope into education.

The merger with Macmillan was followed by a flurry of other mergers and acquisitions, all money makers for Loeb, Rhoades & Co. Of Crowell-Collier's acquisitions, Erpf proclaimed, "My main interest is Loeb, Rhoades. After all, everything starts from there." Crowell-Collier's corporate strategy remained less clearly defined. Raymond C. Hagel, who became Crowell-Collier's chairman in 1964, said, "We envision our major role as that of a developer of complete educational systems." That system was a "unified instructional package involving a variety of tools." and "the business of education has become a successor to the defense industry. It is a security lifeline."

Crowell would end the decade as Crowell Collier & Macmillan, a highly indebted conglomeration of subsidiaries that included books, schools, magazines, educational tools, bookstores, book clubs and radio stations and with an annual revenue of $390 million. But, as one analyst wrote of the company, "it takes one kind of talent to buy everything in sight with easy money and another kind to operate the creation when the financial momentum shifts into reverse." Prodded by Armand G. Erpf and other investment advisors, Crowell Collier & Macmillan's management had the talent to buy businesses, but questionable skill at operating them. When profits from encyclopedia sales ebbed in the early 1970s, the highly leveraged conglomerate was in trouble. In 1973, Macmillan, with its traditional business, domestic publishing, amounting to only 25% of revenues, reported a profit of a mere $16.7 million on $420 million in sales. By comparison, the company's former profit center, P.F. Collier and Son, had managed over $5 million in profit in 1956 on sales of just $25 million. Crowell Collier & Macmillan had financed its 1960s expansion with a mountain of debt, amounting to $75 million in 1973, and interest on the debt proved a heavy burden.

=== Encyclopedias, books and educational materials ===
Since 1909 (vols 1–25) and 1910 (vols 26–50) P.F. Collier and Son had published the 50-volume Harvard Classics (expanded to 51 volumes in 1914), an anthology of classic and world literature. The company continued to publish the Harvard Classics and expanded its line of encyclopedias by beginning work on a new multi-volume set on social sciences.

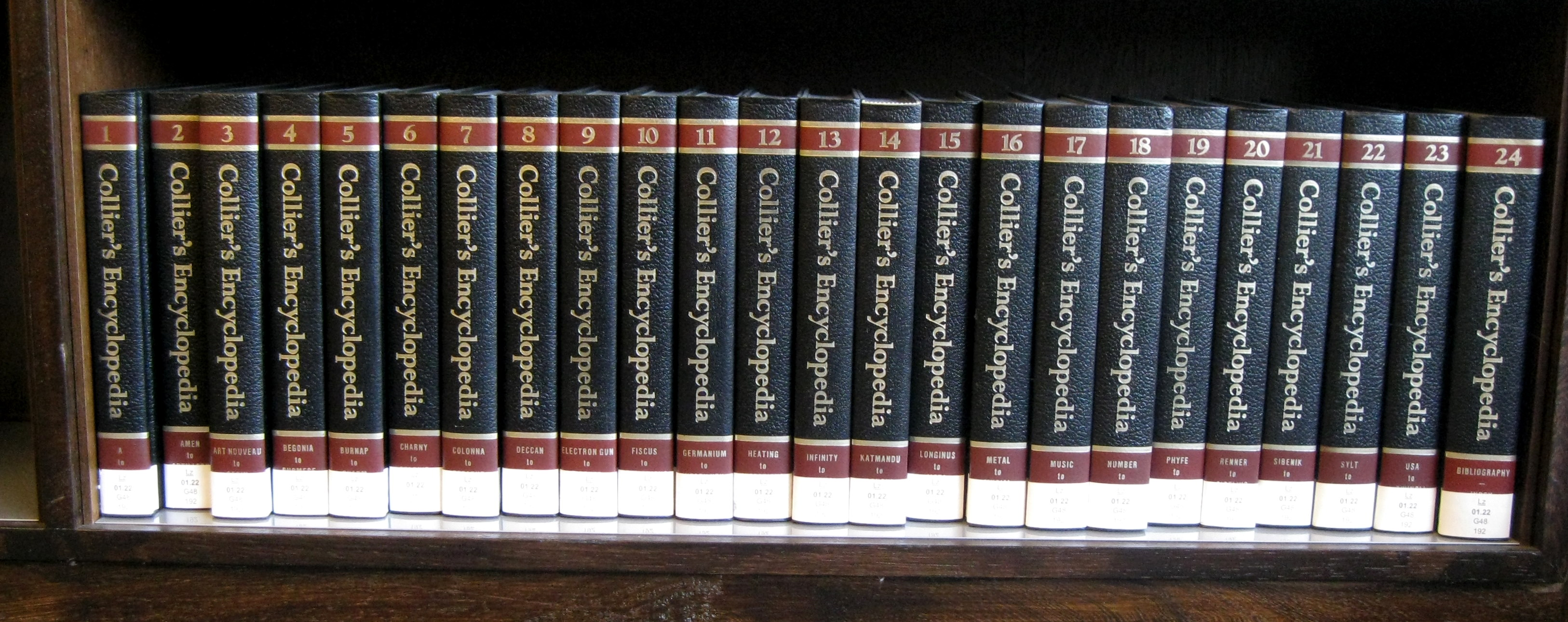
Collier's Encyclopedia

In 1969, The Federal Trade Commission ordered the company to stop deceptive sales of Collier's Encyclopedia. The agency charged the company with "Implying through promotional literature and door-to-door salesmen that a set of the encyclopedias would be given free or at a reduced price if yearly supplements were purchased."

In 1960, Crowell began to expand further into general book markets. Collier Books, the paperback division of Crowell-Collier Publishing Company, began publishing in October 1961 at the rate of 50 paperback titles a month. The list included scholarly books, nonfiction and fiction reprints and original works. Crowell-Collier Press was a hardcover publisher started in 1962 with a focus on adult nonfiction and children's books. The children's series, the Modern Masters Books for Children, was edited by anthologist Louis Untermeyer and included picture books by Robert Graves (The Big Green Book), Shirley Jackson (9 Magic Wishes) and Phyllis McGinley (The B Book). The books were created using a controlled vocabulary of fewer than 800 words created by elementary educators.

In 1962, Crowell also purchased book club distributor Scientific Materials, Inc., which included Library of Science, Science Book Club, Natural History Book Club, and Basic Book Service. In addition to the four professional level book clubs, two others aimed at young adults including the Young Adults' Division and Junior Scientists Division of the Library of Science were also a part of the acquisition. Crowell-Collier later that same year turned around and sold the toy manufacturing arm of Scientific Materials, Inc. to Allis-Chalmers manufacturing

In 1962, Crowell made another push into the book market with a purchase of book clubs and retail bookstores. In the same year, they purchased 16 Brentano's bookstores. At the time bookstores were heavily competing with department stores and discount houses offering reduced rates for bestsellers. By 1967, the Brentano's chain had grown to 21 stores and had sales of $7 million.

In 1962, Crowell-Collier Publishing Company created a new division called Crowell-Collier Educational Corporation. The educational arm was created to develop instructional and reference materials as well as teaching aids for us in schools, colleges, adult education, business, and industrial training and home study.

Other acquisitions included the following:

- English Language Services, Inc. (1962), instructional materials used abroad to teach English-as-a-second language.
- Publication Corporation (1968)
- Associated Films, Inc. (1968), an educational film distribution company
- Bruce Publishing Company (1968), a publisher of Catholic religion and educational books.
- P.J. Kenedy & Sons (1968), a publisher of Catholic religion and educational books.
- Hagstrom Company, Inc (1968), creator of educational materials and services.
- Fleetwood Films, Inc. (1968), films for home and educational use.
- Pandex, Inc, (1968) a reference company.
- Brandon (1968), another education and film distribution company founded by Thomas Brandon.
- G. Schirmer, Inc.,(1968) a music and publishing company
- Studio Vista, Ltd. (1968)—British publisher of books on graphic arts, architecture and design.
- Geoffrey Chapman, Ltd. (1968)-British publisher of Catholic books
- Benziger Brothers (1969)—publishers of religious and education books.
- Cassell & Co. Holdings, Ltd, (1969). a British publishing company.
- Standard Rate & Data Services, Inc., a publisher of advertising and marketing data, and National Register Publishing, a directory publisher.

=== Home study and vocational training ===
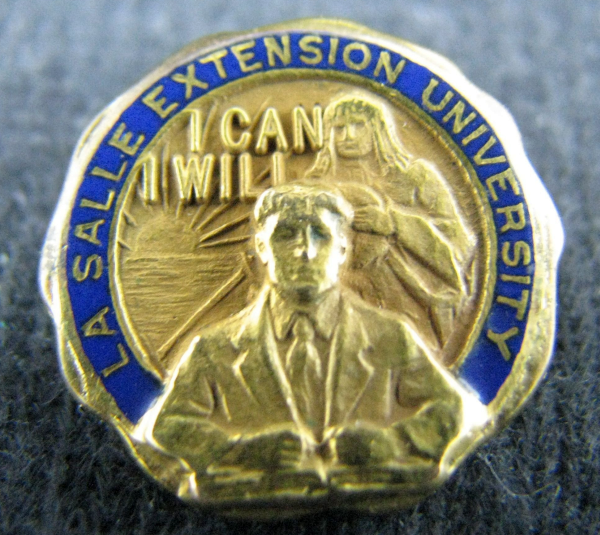
La Salle Extension University Alumni Pin

Vocational training became big business in the 1960s as companies attempted fill a void between a high school diploma and college degrees and Crowell-Collier made significant acquisitions expanding into this market. In 1960, Crowell purchased the La Salle Extension University—a correspondence school. In 1965 Crowell Collier & Macmillan, Inc. purchased Berlitz Schools of Languages of America, Inc.and Berlitz Publications for $5 million. Crowell purchased Katherine Gibbs School, Inc. a secretarial school. It also attempted to acquire Famous Artists Schools, Inc. a writing and art correspondence school by purchasing 25% of shares which it later sold to institutional investors in 1968.

In 1969, Crowell filed a lawsuit against National Home Study Council of Washington which was a private accrediting agency. The suit said that National Home was a monopoly and had denied re-accreditation to the U.S. School of Music, Inc. and La Salle Extension University. By 1969, Crowell made 22% of its revenue from La Salle Extension University, Berlitz, and Katharine Gibbs. The lawsuit settled but at the same time, the entire mail-order schooling came under fire from the New York Times for dubious practices including "overblown advertising, fast talking salesmen, questionable instruction and marginal results."

=== Return to magazines ===
In 1968 the company merged with Publication Corporation, a leading printer of Sunday magazines for newspapers and the publisher of This Week magazine. The companies had a shared history—Joseph P. Knapp, who had helped develop the Crowell Publishing Company, had founded Publication Corporation as American Lithograph Company in 1891. The Publication had also been a principal stockholder of Crowell-Collier—owning 24% at one point. The goal for the merger was to distribute periodicals efficiently in the education market. By 1969, Crowell made the decision to shut down the This Week magazine which had a circulation of 9 million as a weekend supplement for papers such as The Providence Journal and the Kansas City Star.

In 1969 Crowell Collier & Macmillan went back to publishing magazines but with a focus on education. They acquired six magazines including Grade Teacher, the Catholic School Journal, Industrial Arts and Vocational Education, College Management, School Management and Business Management. These magazines made up a subsidiary CCM magazines based in Greenwich, Conn.

==== Other media ====
Crowell-Collier Broadcasting operated radio stations in Los Angeles (KFWB), San Francisco-Oakland-San Jose (KEWB) and Minneapolis-St. Paul (KDWB).

In 1969 Crowell-Collier purchased the Gump's store in San Francisco.

Crowell-Collier purchased C.G. Conn a manufacturer of musical instruments in 1968.

In 1966 the company consolidated 1400 employees into a new building on 866 3rd Avenue called the Crowell Collier & Macmillan building.

=== 1970s ===
By the start of the 1970s, Crowell Collier & Macmillan was now a $400 million multinational producer of books and educational materials. Crowell Collier & Macmillan decided to change the name of the company to Macmillan, Inc. First, though, they encountered a legal battle over the name with Macmillan Publishers Ltd. of London—who had spun-off the original American Macmillan in 1896 and sold its stake in 1951. For the name to take effect on January 1, 1973, the companies agreed to some conditions including the American company using Crowell-Collier or another name to distinguish the businesses in which the British Macmillan operated (as an example, the Canadian division of the American Macmillan assumed the legal name of Collier Macmillan Canada, to disambiguate it from the British Macmillan subsidiary, Macmillan of Canada). The British Macmillan stated that the name had already been causing confusion with the public resulting in misdirected book orders and the fear that the American company was planning to use the name to compete unfairly in markets where the British company was active. The case cited the Lanham Act, the trademark act of 1946.

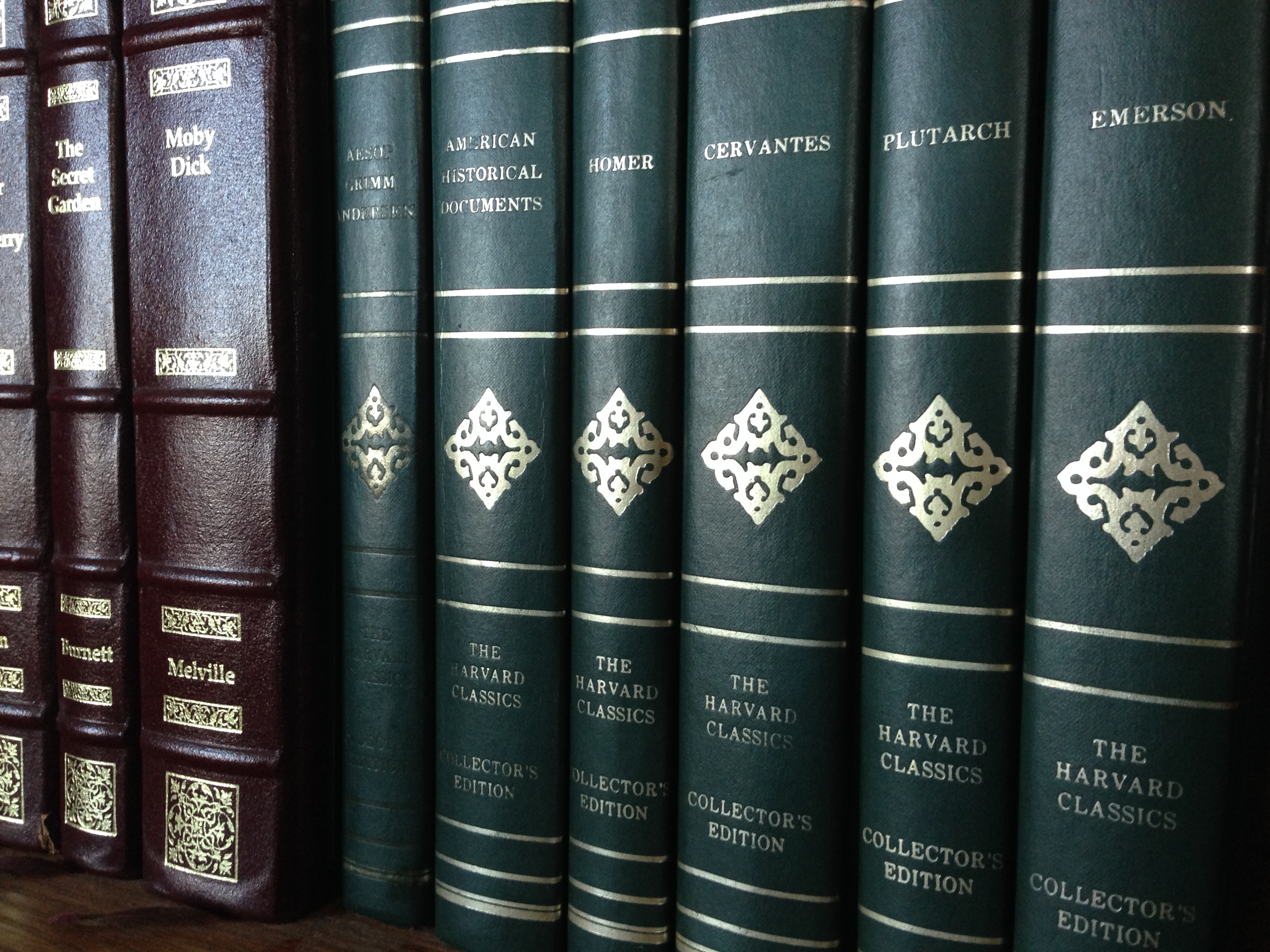
The Harvard Classics books on a bookshelf

This was not the only legal battle that the now Macmillan, Inc. faced at the start of the seventies. Macmillan sued Charles F. Berlitz, grandson of the founder of Berlitz to prohibit him from using the Berlitz name in travel and writing businesses. Berlitz won the lawsuit and was awarded $376,000 and the right to use his name as an author of books on foreign languages. The Justice Department filed a civil anti-trust suit against Crowell, Collier & Macmillan, Inc. in 1970 and requested that it divest itself from C.G. Conn, Ltd (a manufacturer and retailer of musical instruments) and Uniforms by Ostwald, Inc. (manufacturer and retailer of band uniforms).

Crowell-Collier was also under fire by the FTC again in 1972 and accused of using deceptive practices in selling its The Harvard Classics and in billing encyclopedia buyers and also in recruiting of encyclopedia salesmen. Of The Harvard Classics, the FTC stated that while the company marketed that one or several volumes were offered free or for $1 each "with the understanding that additional volumes priced at $3.98 would be shipped periodically for free examination", many volumes would be shipped in a bulk shipment. Buyers were subjected to repeated mailings of bills. Crowell responded that they had already discontinued The Harvard Classics "continuity" program and that any "isolated" occurrences or procedures had been changed. For the encyclopedias, Crowell was accused of raising the price on Encyclopedia annual supplements called Yearbooks. They were also accused of advertising positions for encyclopedia salesman as "administrative assistant trainees" and "marketing and public relations personnel". Crowell issued a statement disavowing any violations but agreed to negotiate a consent order.

Martin Gardner protesting Crowell-Collier's publishing of the psychic surgeon John G. Fuller's book Arigo withdrew publication of his own (Gardner) book.

== Magazines ==
- Farm & Fireside (1877–1939): The early content of this magazine advertised agricultural implements manufactured by P. P. Mast & Co. When farming became a commercialized industry, Farm & Fireside changed to address it commercial and economic aspects and provided a first-hand account of America's conversion from a rural to an urban population.
- Woman's Home Companion (1883–1950): The popularity of the women's section of Farm & Fireside created a demand for a publication dedicated to women. The company acquired The Home Companion magazine in 1883 and changed the name to Ladies Home Companion and then later to Women's Home Companion.
- The American Magazine (1911–1956): The magazine began as Leslie's Popular Monthly in 1876 and was then sold in 1906 to muckrakers Ray Stannard Barker, Ida Tarbell, and Lincoln Steffans. The periodical addressed the hopes and aspirations of the ordinary man was purchased by Crowell-Collier in 1911.
- Collier's (1919–1956): The magazine was originally established by Peter Fenelon Collier in New York in 1888. It was purchased by Crowell Publishing in 1919 and ceased publication in 1956.
- The Mentor (1921–1930): This magazine focused on topics including science, art, history, literature and travel. The Mentor merged with the World Traveler in 1930 as the Mentor-World Traveler and ceased publication that same year.
