= Mary Kidder =

Mary Kidder may refer to:

- Mary Eddy Kidder, American missionary and educator
- Mary A. Kidder, American hymnwriter
