= Syverson =

Syverson is a surname. Notable people with the surname include:

- Dave Syverson (born 1957), American politician
- Henry Syverson or Hank Syverson (1918–2007), American cartoonist and illustrator
- Jon Syverson (born 1980), American musician
- Paul Syverson, mathematician who co-developed onion routing
