= William Woestendiek =

American journalist

William John Woestendiek (March 14, 1924 – January 16, 2015) was an American editor and journalist. A native of Newark, New Jersey, he began his journalism career at the University of North Carolina at Chapel Hill, North Carolina. He served in the United States Army during World War II and in the Korean War.

== Career ==
Woestendiek was editor of IBM's Think magazine and a city editor of The Houston Post. He was brought in to revamp the editorial format of This Week, a nationally syndicated Sunday magazine supplement that was included in American newspapers between 1935 and 1969. "We tried hard to turn out a better editorial product," an unnamed Crowell, Coller executive told The New York Times. "We succeeded in doing it, but nobody wanted it."

Woestendiek then took a job in 1969 with WETA-TV, a PBS station in Washington, D.C., where he was the anchor, editor and producer of a television news program, “Newsroom.” He lost this position in April 1970 when his wife Kay accepted a position as press secretary to Martha Mitchell, the “outspoken” wife of Attorney General John N. Mitchell. William J. McCarter, general manager of WETA, a public broadcasting station, said that Woestendiek was being ‘relieved of his duties’ as a direct result of his wife's new job. “‘We have great respect for Mr. Woestendiek,’ McCarter said, ‘but this station’s action was necessary to avoid any possible charge of bias or influence which might affect the program...’” Woestendiek stated that he was told by station management to “tell your wife to quit or else...” “Woestendiek said he replied: ‘I won’t even ask her.’” Woestendiek stated that he would not stay with WETA under any capacity. “Kay Woestendiek joined Mrs. Mitchell last week as a press aide on the attorney general’s private payroll in the midst of a controversy generated by Mrs. Mitchell’s early-morning call to the Arkansas Gazette demanding that it ‘crucify’ Sen. J. William Fulbright, D-Ark, April 10.”

San Francisco Chronicle columnist Art Hoppe wrote a humorous piece headlined “John Loves Martha Still” in which Kay Woestendiek referees a conversation between the Mitchells after her hiring as a press secretary.
