= Gertrude Battles Lane =

American editor

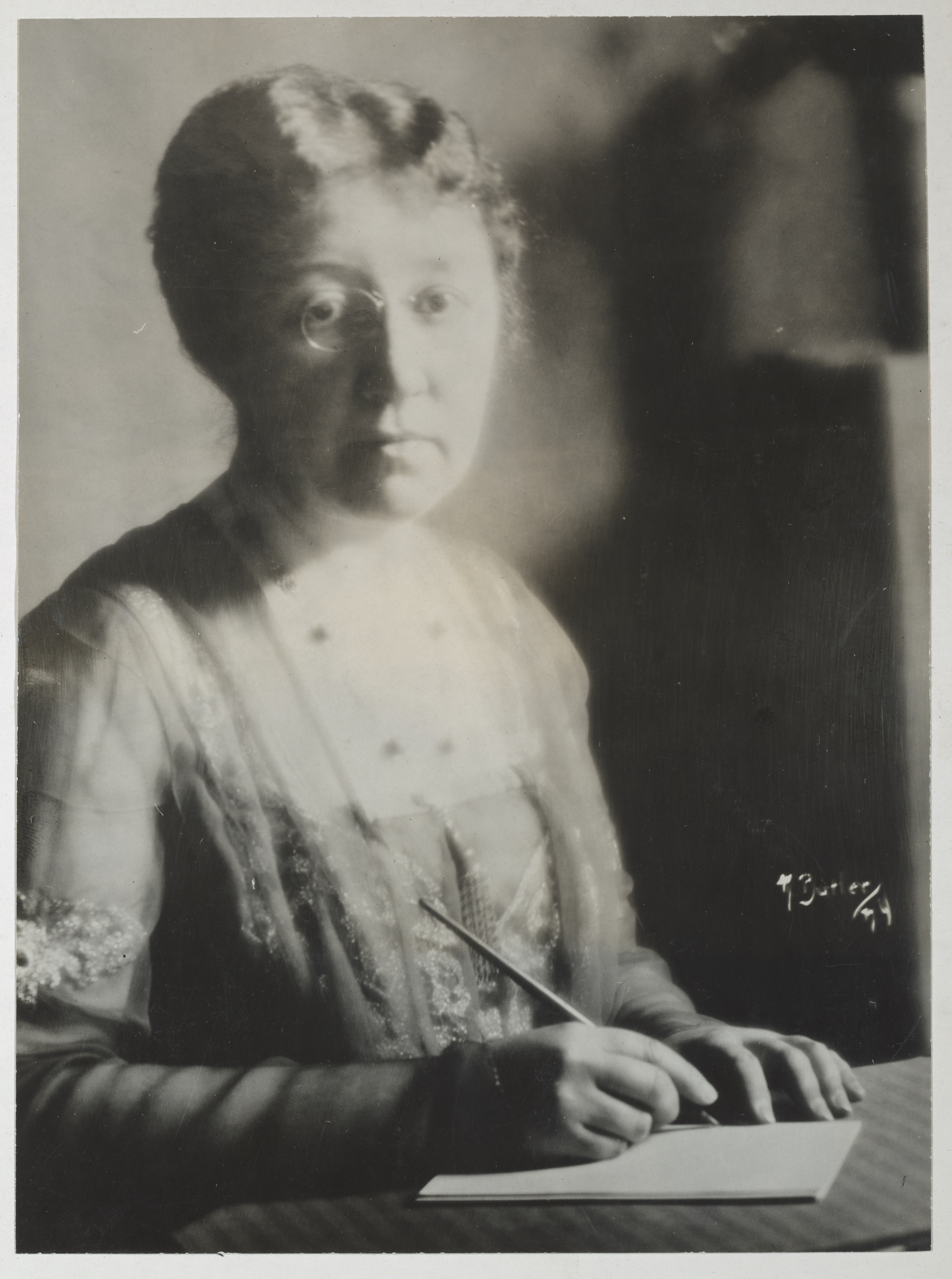
- Gertrude Battles Lane in 1917-1918 as part of the U.S. Food Administration
- Born: December 21, 1874; Saco, Maine
- Died: September 25, 1941 (aged 66)
- Occupation: Editor
- Parent(s): Eustance Lane; Ella Battles Lane
- Honors: Honouary doctorate from Colby College

Gertrude Battles Lane (December 21, 1874—September 25, 1941) was an American editor and was editor-in-chief of the Women's Home Companion from 1912 until 1941. According to the New York Times obituary, she was known as "the dean of magazine editors in this country". During World War I, Lane was a member of Herbert Hoover's food administration.

== Early life ==
Lane was born on December 21, 1874, in Saco, Maine. Her parents were Eustace Lane and Ella Battles Lane. Lane had contracted scarlet fever at eight years old. She went to school at Thornton Academy and graduated there in 1892. In her youth, she had moved to Boston, and was employed as a stenographer while she was also assisting with editing at The Boston Beacon, which was a small magazine.

== Early career at the Women's Home Companion (1903-1912) ==
In 1903, Women's Home Companion editor-in-chief Arthur T. Vance (1872-1930) offered Lane a job as household editor at the magazine. She accepted even though it meant she would make $2 a week less in salary. At the time of her employment, according to the New York Times, the magazine only had an eight-person staff, and in her own words as quoted by the Times, she was "a regular maid of all work" at the magazine. In 1909, she was promoted to managing editor, and in 1912 became editor-in-chief of the magazine.

== As editor-in-chief at the Women's Home Companion (1912-1941) ==
When Lane had become editor-in-chief, the magazine's circulation was around 738,000 monthly. In 1913, Women's Home Companion created the Better Babies Bureau and started to sponsor and organize better babies contests throughout the United States. The Bureau had offered advice to mothers on how to better their child's health. Lane was supportive of this movement, being concerned both for the health of children and also for eugenics reasons. The movement for better babies contests also had background in the eugenics movements of the time. The N.Y. Times obituary notes that the Better Babies Bureau was one of the most successful features that she had a hand in.

The New York Times obituary noted that Lane "headed up a staff of personally selected and trained sub-editors supplemented by 20,000 reader-editors". In 1920, after the Nineteenth Amendment to the United States Constitution was ratified, Lane started the first magazine campaign to fully educate women on the benefits and usage of voting. In 1929, Lane was elected as vice president of Crowell Publishing Company, becoming the first woman to be vice president of a publishing company. In 1929, Lane was making an annual salary of $52,000.

In 1932, the Women's Home Companion published an editorial in favor of repealing the Eighteenth Amendment to the United States Constitution. Lane had felt the change to public opinion was obvious to take that step.

In 1939, Lane's salary was revealed to have been $52,000 a year, which few women at the time would have made.

== Death and legacy ==
In 1941, Lane fell ill and died on September 25, 1941, at her home. She was buried at Laurel Hill Cemetery in Saco. She had never married. At the time of her death, the Women's Home Companion had a monthly circulation of more than 3,500,000.

== Awards and honors ==
In 1929, Lane was awarded an honorary doctorate in letters by Colby College. In 1996, The Thornton Academy Alumni Association granted Lane a posthumous award, which was accepted by her grand-niece.

== Political activities ==
Lane served in Hoover's U.S. Food Administration during the First World War, and this was the beginning of their political association. Lane was involved with Hoover's 1920 campaign to become president. Lane was a member of the Women's Republican Club in New York City in 1928 and had been the first to pledge to register one woman voter for his presidential election. During the Hoover Administration, Lane was a member of the White House Conference on Child Health and Protection, and a member of the White House Conference on Home Building and Home Ownership.
