= Geoffrey Chapman =

Australian publisher (1930–2010)

Geoffrey Chapman (5 April 1930 – 9 May 2010) was an Australian publisher. He was the founder of the British publisher Geoffrey Chapman Ltd, which published more than 90 ecclesiastical titles.

Geoffrey Chapman Ltd was acquired by Crowell-Collier Macmillan. Crowell-Collier Macmillan later acquired Cassell, of which Geoffrey Chapman became an imprint. Cassell's academic and religious lists (including Geoffrey Chapman) were merged with American company Continuum to form the Continuum International Publishing Group in 1999. Continuum was later taken over by Bloomsbury Publishing in 2011.
