= Woman's Home Companion =

American monthly magazine

- Cover by Władysław T. Benda for the January 1936 issue
- Categories: Women's magazine
- Frequency: Monthly
- Founder: S.L. and Frederick Thorpe
- Founded: 1873
- Final issue: January 1957
- Company: Crowell-Collier
- Country: United States
- Based in: Springfield, Ohio
- Language: English

Woman's Home Companion was an American monthly magazine, published from 1873 to 1957. It was highly successful, climbing to a circulation peak of more than four million during the 1930s and 1940s. The magazine, headquartered in Springfield, Ohio, was discontinued in 1957.

Among the contributors to the magazine were editor Gene Gauntier, and authors Temple Bailey, Ellis Parker Butler, Rachel Carson, Arthur Guiterman, Patricia Highsmith, Shirley Jackson, Anita Loos, Neysa McMein, Kathleen Norris, Sylvia Schur, John Steinbeck, Willa Cather, Frank Albert Waugh and P. G. Wodehouse. Notable illustrators included Rolf Armstrong, Władysław T. Benda, Elizabeth Shippen Green, Bessie Pease Gutmann, Rico Lebrun, Neysa McMein, Violet Oakley, Herbert Paus, May Wilson Preston, Olive Rush, Arthur Sarnoff and Frederic Dorr Steele.

== History ==
=== 19th-Century ===
==== Early Days ====
Spurred on by the success of other mail-order monthlies, two brothers, S.L. and Frederick Thorpe of Cleveland, Ohio started their magazine in 1874. The magazine called The Home was only eight pages in size, produced on cheap paper and the subscription price was fifty cents a year. The content consisted of household articles, fiction by unknown writers and advertisements mostly for mail-order items. A year after Frederick died in 1877, S.L. acquired another Cleveland periodical called Little Ones at Home. Thorpe consolidated both titles under the new title of Home Companion: A Monthly for Young People. According to Thorpe, but not verified officially circulation reached eighty-eight thousand. Thorpe had been studying medicine, and when he started his practice in 1881, he sold the paper to E.B. Harvey and Frank S. Finn. In 1882, after starting a higher-class magazine without advertising called Young Folks' Circle, Harvey & Finn sold The Home Companion to Mast, Crowell, & Kirkpatrick of Springfield, Ohio.

==== 1880s ====
Phineas P. Mast had hired John Crowell of Lexington, Kentucky to launch and manage Farm & Fireside magazine in Springfield, Ohio. P.P. Mast made his money through agricultural equipment and wanted a magazine to promote his wares. Farm & Fireside launched in 1877, and the firm acquired The Home Companion in 1883 after realizing the market for content aimed at women. Crowell then purchased Harvey & Finn's Young Folks' Circle in 1884, which was absorbed into The Home Companion two years later. In November 1886, the name of the periodical was changed to Ladies' Home Companion. Mast's nephew, T.J. Kirkpatrick was the first general editor of the periodical.

During the 1880s, the magazine changed size and length, and the quality of the content was improved by the addition of writers such as Maria Louise Pool, James Otis, and Eben E. Rexford. Now published semi-monthly, an important feature of the magazine was a Practical Housekeeping department, which was created by Eliza R. Parker. Woodcuts were used for illustration and at times the magazine reprinted articles from other magazines. Coverage was given to food, fashion, and serialized fiction. Topics covered included—household budgeting, home building, and furnishing, needlework, health, childcare, and etiquette. By 1889 circulation had reached eighty thousand, and, in 1890, it hit one hundred thousand. It was considered a leader in the field of women's interest magazines.

==== 1890s ====
The cover was created for the first time for the Christmas issue of 1891—covers would not become a regular feature until three or four years later and halftone pictures made from photographs would appear in 1891. It was in 1893 that the price of the magazine was raised to one dollar a year. At the time the Companion competed with the Ladies' Home Journal which was twice as long, only published twelve times a year, and had a much larger circulation. To compete, the Companion went to a monthly publication and cut the price back to fifty cents—at the same time it upped the quality of its articles and writers. Circulation soon rose to 300,000 by 1898—still only half of the Ladies' Home Journal. To further the distance—the Companion's name was officially changed to Woman's Home Companion in 1896. According to Frank L. Mott's History of the American Magazine, the editor, presumably Joseph F. Henderson, wrote of the change in the January 1887 edition:

The indiscriminate use and abuse of the term "lady" has robbed it of so much of its meaning that it has been in a measure tabooed by those who deserve the title in its best sense. The noblest ambition of our end-of-the-century femininity is to be a "woman."..."Woman" is an honest Anglo-Saxon word, and has no synonym. The use of "lady" as a synonym for "woman" is vulgar.

During the 1890s in addition to housekeeping tips the magazine also covered subjects such as college education for girls, women in the arts and civil service, travel abroad, women's clubs and health. There was no mention of the war with Spain except for one article on the American Red Cross in the September 1898 issue.

=== 20th century ===
==== Turn of the Century ====
At the turn of the century, the magazine's parent company went through some changes. P.P. Mast died in 1898 and 1901, T. J. Kirkpatrick sold his remaining interests to John Crowell and the main editorial offices were moved to New York (printing was to remain in Springfield). In 1906, Joseph P. Knapp paid $750,000 for controlling interest in the Crowell Publishing Company. During this period the magazine went from twelve pages of advertisements in 1901 to over 75 by 1907.

At the same time, the magazine went through editor and editorial changes as well. Arthur T. Vance became the editor in 1901 and Vance pushed to broaden the scope of the magazine into general interest areas. During this time many magazines were outlets for what was called muckraking journalism—a general movement in journalism from after 1900 until around World War I. Editors and journalists took on investigative reporting to raise public awareness of social issues of the day. Woman's Home Companion was not known as a muckraking magazine, but under Vance's editorial-ship and push towards general interest stories, the magazine featured a crusade against child slavery during 1906-07. Coverage included child-workers in cotton mills, canning factories, tailoring, and sweat shops. The January 1907 issue featured a statement signed by President Theodore Roosevelt entitled, Where I Stand on Child Labor Reform. Under Vance there was coverage of art and music, architecture, books in addition to the regular departments dealing with fashion and the home.

Vance was also interested in short stories and the list of authors who published included Frank H. Spearman, Hamlin Garland, Sarah Orne Jewett, Bret Harte, Robert Grant, Jack London, Eden Philpotts, Morgan Robertson and Rafael Sabatini. Jack London wrote the short story the Apostate, which was published in the September 1906 edition. London also published coverage of his cruise around the South Pacific under the title, Round the World for the Woman's Home Companion . This journey was also the basis for London's book The Cruise of the Snark.

==== The Battles Lane years ====
The most influential editor of Woman's Home Companion was Gertrude Battles Lane (December 21, 1874 – September 25, 1941), the editor from 1911 until a few months before her death in 1941. Lane started her editing career with Crowell in 1903 at eighteen dollars a week—her salary before she died was fifty thousand a year. Frank Luther Mott, Dean Emeritus of the School of Journalism at the University of Missouri and winner of a Pulitzer prize for the History of Magazines in America stated that Lane was one of the greatest woman editors of her generation. Lane understood her audience and once stated her editorial creed which was aspirational for her readers:

In editing the Woman's Home Companion, I keep constantly in mind a picture of the housewife of today as I see her. She is not the woman who wants to do more housework, but the woman who wants to do less housework so that she will have more time for other things.

She is intelligent and clear-headed; I must tell her the truth. She is busy; I must not waste her time. She is forever seeking new ideas; I must keep her in touch with the best. Her horizon is ever extending, her interest broadening: the pages of the Woman's Home Companion must reflect the sanest and most constructive thought on vital issues of the day.

During the first World War, Margaret Deland reported from France and Lane spent time in Washington working with the Food Administration. The magazine published a section called "Ideas for War Work at Home" and the magazine ran a Treasure and Trinket fun—women sold or melted jewelry and gave the proceeds to the Air Force.

As part of the eugenics and efficiency movements, child health advocate Mary DeGarmo created a "better baby contest" at the 1908 Louisiana State Fair, modeled after agricultural shows' judgement of the appearance, proportions, and weight of livestock. In 1913, Women’s Home Companion highlighted DeGarmo's work and sent editor Anna Steese Richardson to begin sponsoring similar competitions at county fairs. In 1914, the magazine sponsored a "colored baby contest" in North Carolina, a segregated event for African Americans to receive health advice from Black doctors and nurses. US Children's Bureau Director Julia Lathrop criticized competing along subjective criteria, leading her to collaborate with the American Medical Association and launch children's health conferences that would gauge a child's health without ranking them.

Under her directorship, each issue featured two serials, four to five short stories, six specials and many monthly departments. For a time, Eleanor Roosevelt published a page in the magazine, and Presidents William Howard Taft, Woodrow Wilson, Calvin Coolidge, and Herbert Hoover wrote on occasion for the magazine.

During this period, the Companion competed with Ladies' Home Journal, McCalls and Pictorial Review. By the 1930s, it led by a small margin with a circulation of 3,000,000 in 1938. Despite the high circulation advertising revenue declined for a while during the Great Depression but had begun to recover by 1939. Also in 1939, Crowell was reorganized as the Crowell-Collier Publishing Company.

==== World War II Years ====
After Lane died in 1941, the magazine changed editors and shifted focus. Willa Roberts, who had been a writer and staff member for twenty years, became the editor for a short time. The magazine covered the war with correspondents in Europe and support activities at home such as war gardens and home canning. Roberts was then followed up by Willam A. H. Birnie in 1943. Birnie had previously been the assistant editor of Crowell's the American Magazine and then the managing editor for the Companion. Birnie (who had started in newspapers) and Roger Dakin, an article editor shifted the focus of the magazine to crusading for causes—the magazine became known as "the fighting lady." An article on keeping children out of jail with adults resulted in New York state legislation.

=== Final years and shutdown ===
By the 1940s, magazines had moved away from fictional short stories and serials to non-fiction features and articles, and the Woman's Home Companion followed suit. In another nod to changing times, the Companion moved advertising to the front of the magazine and double-page layouts of color became common.

Circulation by 1950 was four million and advertisement rates were high by 1953 when the rate for a black-and-white page was $12,880. But then advertising declined rapidly, and the magazine faced hard times. Paul C. Smith, who was President of Crowell-Collier in 1954, was named editor-in-chief for Woman's Home Companion, Collier's and The American Magazine.

A decade after editor Battles Lane's death, the magazine began a decrease in page count, from 945 pages in 1951 to 544 pages in 1956. The situation at Collier's was comparable. Publisher Crowell-Collier closed The American Magazine, its healthier publication, in order to save Collier's and the Companion. By July 1956 it was calculated that the annual loss of the magazine would reach $3 million. Just before Christmas 1956, both ailing publications folded, and 2740 employees, mostly printing workers, were laid off without severance pay or pensions. Collier's and Woman's Home Companion came to an end January 1957, shortly after the first 1957 issues were distributed.

In the History of the American Magazines, the closure of the Woman's Home Companion was "mourned by many readers, for it had long been a lively, interesting, and helpful member of the group of leading magazines for women and the home."

After shuttering the magazines, Crowell Collier Publishing Company would reinvent itself as an educational company.

== Other publications ==
Occasionally, the Companion's stories were collected in anthologies such as Seven Short Novels from the Woman's Home Companion, edited by Barthold Fles. The magazine also published such non-fiction as John Wister's Woman's Home Companion Garden Book (Collier, 1947). A collection of American recipes, The Woman's Home Companion Cook Book was compiled by the magazine's staff and edited by Dorothy Kirk in editions printed from 1942 through 1947 by P.F. Collier & Son Corporation, New York. This collection of over 2,600 recipes, with illustrations and homemaking instructions, is still prized by contemporary cooks.

- Seven Short Novels from Woman's Home Companion (1949)
- Woman's Home Companion Garden Book (1947)
- Woman's Home Companion Household Book (1948)
- The Woman's Home Companion Cook Book (various editions in the 1940s)

== Organization ==
The magazine was titled The Home from January 1874 to 1878, Home Companion from 1878 to 1886, Our Young People for a brief period in 1883, Ladies' Home Companion from 1886 to 1896, and Woman's Home Companion from 1897 until its January 1957 closure. From January 1874 to 1880, the magazine was released on a monthly schedule, while from 1880 to 1896, it shifted to a semi-monthly publishing frequency. From 1896 until its January 1957 closure, the magazine regained its monthly release schedule and would publish annual volumes.

=== Publishers ===
- Thorpe & Bros., Cleveland, Ohio (1874–1877)
- S.L. Thorpe, Cleveland, Ohio (1877–1881)
- Harvey & Finn, Cleveland, Ohio (1881–1883)
- Mast, Crowell & Kirkpatrick, Springfield, Ohio (1883–1898) and in Philadelphia, Pennsylvania (1891-1895)
- Crowell & Kirkpatrick Co., Springfield, Ohio (1898–1901)
- Crowell Publishing Company, published in Springfield, Ohio but editorial offices in New York (1901–1939)
- Crowell-Collier Publishing Company, New York and Springfield, Ohio (1939–1957)

=== Presidents ===
- S. L. Thorpe (1874–1881)
- E. B. Harvey (1881–1883)
- P. P. Mast (1883–1898)
- John S. Crowell (1898–1906)
- George H. Hazen (1906–1918)
- George D. Buckley (1918–1923)
- Lee W. Maxwell (1923–1934)
- Thomas H. Beck (1934–1947)
- Albert E. Winger (1947–1953)
- Paul Clifford Smith (1953–1957)

=== Editors ===
- S. L. Thorpe (1874–1881)
- E. B. Harvey (1881–1883)
- T. J. Kirkpatrick (1883–1896)
- Joseph Franklin Henderson (1896–1900)
- Arthur Turner Vance (1900–1906)
- Frederick L. Collins (1906–1911)
- Gertrude B. Lane (1912–1941)
- Willa Roberts (Plank) (1941–1943)
- William A. H. Birnie (1943–1952)
- Woodrow Wirsig (1953–1956)
- Theodore Strauss (1956–1957)

== Bibliography ==
- "A Preliminary Letter from Jack London Who Is Going Around the World for the Woman's Home Companion", Woman's Home Companion, November 1906.
- Blazing the Trail: The Autobiography of Gene Gauntier, Woman's Home Companion, 1928-29.
- "The Married Woman Goes Back to Work", Woman's Home Companion, October 1956.
