= Irwin Caplan =

American cartoonist (1919–2007)

Irwin Caplan inks a drawing.

Irwin Caplan (May 24, 1919 – February 22, 2007), nicknamed Cap, was an American illustrator, painter, designer and cartoonist, best known as the creator of The Saturday Evening Post cartoon series, Famous Last Words, which led to newspaper syndication of the feature in 1956.

== Early life ==
Caplan grew up in Seattle's Madison Park neighborhood where his parents took note of his drawings and enrolled him in art classes. As a teenager, Caplan won $10 in a citywide poster contest, and at Garfield High School, he illustrated the 1935 yearbook, The Arrow. He painted murals of a circus and Paul Bunyan on walls of the school, where he graduated in 1937.

At the University of Washington, after he spent three years contributing to Columns, the university's humor magazine, the staff wanted him to be the editor. However, the faculty claimed the magazine needed "new blood" and designated as editor Lynn Scholes of Steilacoom, Washington, who had never worked on the magazine. This led to an emotional incident at the annual publications banquet in which the magazine's first female editor, Saxon Miller of Vancouver, refused to introduce Scholes and walked out, calling Scholes a "hand-picked editor" with no experience compared to Caplan.

== World War II ==
The following year, after graduating from the University of Washington with a fine arts degree, Caplan served during World War II as an Army illustrator, contributing to several military publications. Beginning in the Tank Force, he advanced to the Army Intelligence art department. When a Signal Corps editorial artist watched Caplan draw a cartoon and commented, "You know you can sell that stuff," Caplan put it in the mail and sold it to Collier's, launching his career as a cartoonist.

== Cartoons, illustrations and paintings ==
Irwin and Madeline Caplan were married in 1948 when he returned to Seattle, where he teamed with illustrator Ted Rand and five other artists to form Graphic Studios, creating corporate logos and a variety of advertising artwork. In addition to such accounts as the Pacific Northwest Bell Telephone, Bardahl and the Mutual Life Insurance Company, Caplan also illustrated the 1962 Seattle World's Fair poster (sponsored by the Frederick & Nelson department store), plus work for the Seattle World's Fair Alaska Pavilion. He was the art director for Spokane's Expo '74.

In the late 1940s through the early 1960s, Caplan's distinctive, crisp cartoon style appeared in Collier's, Esquire, Liberty, Life, Parade and other leading publications. For the Sunday supplement magazine This Week, he contributed a regular weekly thematic grouping of cartoons, sometimes in the form of a vertical comic strip. In addition to Famous Last Words, his other syndicated feature was 48 States of Mind.

Caplan's paintings were exhibited at New York's Metropolitan Museum of Art and the National Gallery in Washington, D.C., and his work was in the permanent collections of the Seattle Art Museum and the Henry Gallery. He taught art at the University of Washington School of Art and at Seattle Central Community College.

Caplan lived in Seattle with his wife and three children. He maintained a summer residence on Vashon Island in Washington's Puget Sound. In January 1966, following heavy rains in the Pacific Northwest, a mudslide pushed his Vashon home 25 yards from its foundation, dumping much of the house into Puget Sound. An image of Caplan's remaining wreckage was distributed to newspapers as an AP Wirephoto under the headlines, "Mudslide Carries Half a House into Puget Sound" and "It's Now a Split Level".

== Awards ==
In 1972, he received the National Cartoonists Society's Advertising and Illustration Award, followed by the 1981 Advertising Award. In November 1999, his artwork was exhibited at Tacoma's Random Modern Gallery in its "Northwest Art 1920-1962" survey exhibition.

In 2005, the murals he painted in 1937 survived a renovation of Garfield High School. One small section showing two trapeze artists was left in place where it had been painted directly on concrete. Portions painted on plaster adhered to clay tile were removed because of seismic safety concerns. Divided into four-by-four foot sections, the plaster paintings were framed and auctioned. Caplan went back to look at the murals in 2003 and commented:

I was very surprised. I didn't think they would stay in as good condition and have as much impact as they actually have. One story I remember from painting them was using a "flit" gun. We didn't have airbrush in those days, and there was a lot of area to be covered. A flit gun is used to spray insecticide, but I dumped the insecticide out and used it to spray color. It had a pump action and a little bucket that hung suspended along the tube. I painted during art periods, spraying away, and the kids in the class, when they sneezed, they would sneeze in color.

== Bibliography ==
- Cowboys and Engines (1962) A collection of automobile cartoons, published by Travelers Insurance.
