= Wilferd Arlan Peterson =

American writer (1900–1995)

Wilferd Arlan Peterson (1900–1995) was an American author who wrote for This Week magazine (a national Sunday supplement in newspapers) for many years. For twenty-five years, he wrote a monthly column for Science of Mind magazine. He published nine books starting in 1949 with The Art of Getting Along: Inspiration for Triumphant Daily Living.

== Biography ==
Wilferd Peterson was born in Whitehall, Michigan, and lived most of his life in Grand Rapids, Michigan. He was married to Ruth Irene Rector Peterson (1921–1979). He credits his wife Ruth as being the inspiration for his work (saying that while he "wrote about the art of living, she lived it"), and they collaborated often on producing these inspirational books.

== Career ==
In Grand Rapids he was the vice president and creative director of an advertising firm. A prolific writer for various industry publications, his inspirational essays began to appear on the "Words To Live By" page of This Week magazine in 1960 (which was distributed in 42 metropolitan Sunday newspapers with over 13 million readers). Letters of praise from admiring readers led to the publication of The Art of Living, the first of a series of books that would sell millions of copies. Essays in this book were also recorded by William J. Nichols, editor of This Week magazine, to produce an album called "The Golden Album of Inspiration".

Peterson was regarded as "one of the best loved American writers of the 20th century, renowned for his inspirational wisdom and aphoristic wit" by the Independent Publishers Group. He was a frequent contributor to This Week magazine, Science of Mind magazine and Reader's Digest.

His influences include Ralph Waldo Emerson, Henry David Thoreau and Abraham Lincoln, among many others. His contemporaries include Norman Vincent Peale and Dale Carnegie, and current writers and philosophers such as Jack Canfield and Brian Tracy have referred to Peterson's works.

His inspirational essays were made into greeting cards, calendars and gift books, which appeared in Hallmark stores from 1970 through 1980. His essays have appeared in Dear Abby's column <http://www.uexpress.com/dearabby/?uc_full_date=20000430>, used within Blue Mountain Arts <http://www.sps.com> gift books and Chicken Soup for the Traveler's Soul <https://www.amazon.com/Chicken-Soup-Travelers-Soul-Inspiration/dp/1558749705>, and specific quotes from his works appear in Quotable Cards.

He is best known for his poem The Art of Marriage (often used as a reading at wedding ceremonies) about marriage, commitment and love which was published in book form by Souvenir Press in April 2006.

== The Art of Marriage poem ==
His most well known writing, The Art of Marriage, has been called by Souvenir Press the "most frequently recited English-language wedding poems and one of the greatest odes to matrimony. It embodies the sentiments, the ideals, and the love to which any marriage aspires. The memorable simplicity of its language makes the poem a touchstone for all couples, both at the start of a relationship and after the blessings of a lifetime in love."

This poem has stood the test of time, circulating with recommendations from couple to couple for almost half a century (and currently on Internet message boards and discussion groups), and is widely used in ceremony readings and printed in wedding programs. Wilferd Peterson's daughter, Lilian Thorpe, has said "this essay has been known to save marriages!" and his granddaughter, Judith Shepherd, has given a framed version of this poem as a gift to many friends over the years. According to Rev. Laurie Sue Brockway, a wedding officiant in New York City and editor of the wedding blog Wedlok.com <http://www.wedlok.com>, the poem was read at Paul Newman and Joanne Woodward's Las Vegas wedding ceremony in 1958, and their marriage is one of the longest lasting Hollywood marriages on record.

== Bibliography ==
Peterson's ten books, published by Harmony Press, Simon & Schuster, Hay House and BBS Publishing Company have spanned 37 years and have been printed in six different languages. He was awarded the George Washington medal from Freedom's Foundation at Valley Forge for "outstanding achievement in bringing about a better understanding of American way of life." BBS Publishing Co. described Wilferd Peterson's essays as promoting "healthy and peaceful living."

=== Published works ===
- The Art of Getting Along (1949)
- The Art of Living (1961)
- The New Book of the Art of Living (1962, 1963)
- More about the Art of Living (1966)
- Adventures in the Art of Living (1968)
- The Art of Living in the World Today (1969)
- The Art of Living Day by Day (1972)
- The Art of Living Treasure Chest (1977)
- The Art of Creative Thinking (1991)
- The Art of Living: Thoughts on Meeting the Challenge of Life (1993)
