= Wealthykeyzz =

Nigerian gospel musician

Olaoluwa Hassan professionally known as Wealthykeyzz is a Nigerian gospel musician and sound recorder. His works include "Forever You Are Great" and "Sacred Echoes of Blessed Assurance".

His works in sound recording include Sound of Jubilee, Praise in Flight and Unusual Praise Medley.

== Biography ==
Wealthykeyzz has worked as a producer and mixing and mastering engineer in albums such as Sound of Jubilee, Praise in Flight and Unusual Praise Medley. Emmanuel Daraloye writing for P.M. News praised WealthyKeyzz's adaptability across production, mixing and mastering, while noting that he had yet to develop a fully recognisable production signature.

Wealthykeyzz released the instrumental singles "Forever You Are Great" and "Sacred Echoes of Blessed Assurance". Chinonso Ihekire of The Guardian described "Forever You Are Great" as a "fluid fusion-driven composition" and noted its use of R&B and jazz elements. Abiola Tolu of P.M. News described the recording as an "immersive soundscape". "Forever You Are Great" was also described by Yunusa Mustapha Independent as a solo piano worship recording, with Hassan using the instrument to carry the expressive role normally associated with a singer or choir.

Tomide Marv writing for ThisDay described "Sacred Echoes of Blessed Assurance" as a contemporary treatment of "Blessed Assurance", combining blues and jazz-influenced harmony, brass and layered instrumentation with a reflective devotional character. Uche Chinelo and Ayuba Garba of TheNEWS similarly praised the recording's transformation of the hymn into an instrumental work, describing its devotional character.
