= Sarah Worrall Lankford Palmer =

Methodist laywoman (1806–1896)

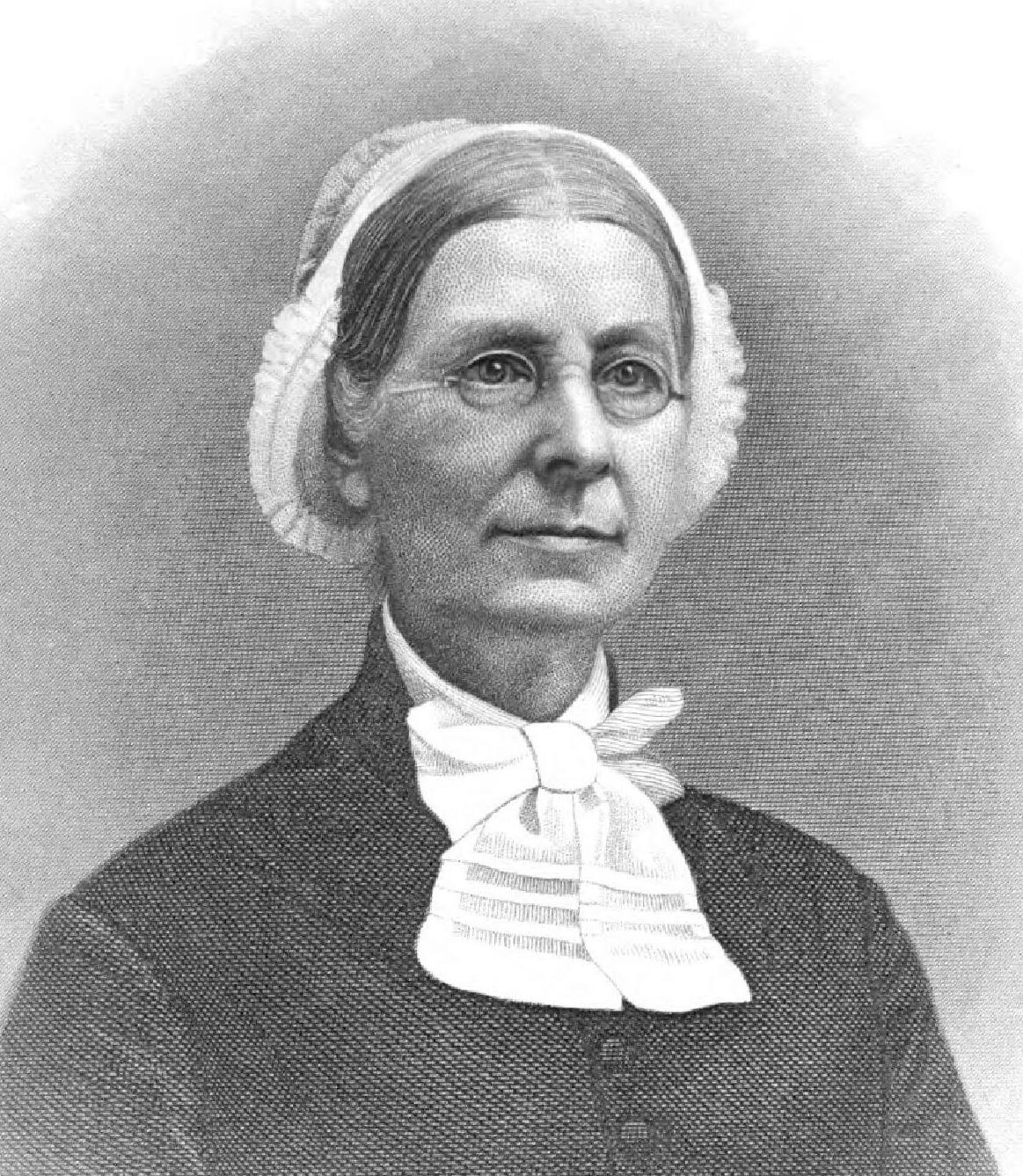
- Born: Sarah Worrall; April 23, 1806; New York, New York
- Died: April 24, 1896 (aged 90); New York, New York

Sarah Worrall Lankford Palmer (1806–1896) was an American Methodist laywoman active in the Holiness movement.

Palmer was born on April 23, 1806, in New York City. Palmer experienced entire sanctification at a camp meeting in 1820. In 1831 she married Thomas Lankford.

In 1835 Palmer began hosting "Tuesday Meeting for the Promotion of Holiness" for Methodist women at her home. Around that time the New York City house was occupied by Sarah Worrall Lankford, her husband, Thomas Lankford, her sister Phoebe Palmer and Phoebe's husband Walter Palmer. Phoebe eventually took over the Tuesday Meetings and became known for her evangelical promotion of the doctrine of Christian perfection.

Sarah's husband, Thomas Lankford, died in 1871, Phoebe Palmer died in 1874. and in 1876 Sarah married Walter Palmer becoming Sarah Worrall Lankford Palmer.

Palmer died on April 24, 1896, in New York City.
