= Paul Giambarba =

American cartoonist (1928–2023)

Paul Francis Giambarba
- Born: October 15, 1928
- Died: May 1, 2023 (aged 94); Mashpee, Massachusetts
- Occupations: Graphic designer, Cartoonist, Writer, Illustrator
- Known for: Initiating Polaroid's corporate image development and product identity
- Notable work: Hundreds of Polaroid packages and collateral material, author of 13 books
- Awards: Gold Medal, Art Directors Club of New York; * Certificates of Merit, Art Directors Club of New York  * Gold Medals, Art Directors Club of Boston  * Certificates of Merit, Art Directors Club of Boston  * Certificates of Excellence, American Institute of Graphic Arts Packaging (1972, 1974, 1976)  * Andy Awards, Advertising Club of New York  * Hatch Awards, Advertising Club of Boston * Certificate of Excellence of Design, Industrial Design magazine Annual Design Review

Paul Francis Giambarba (October 15, 1928 – May 1, 2023) was an American graphic designer, cartoonist, writer and illustrator. He initiated Polaroid's corporate image development and product identity in 1958. Giambarba designed and produced hundreds of Polaroid packages and collateral material including consumer literature and How to Make Better Polaroid Instant Pictures, a trade book for Doubleday & Co. in his more than a quarter of a century for this client. Giambarba has also been a design consultant for Tonka Toys and Tonka Corporation, as well as other corporate clients. His work has been the subject of articles in Graphis (Zurich), Industrial Design, American Artist, Idea (Tokyo), Relax (Tokyo), Grafik (London), Brand eins (Hamburg) and Communication Arts.

In his capacity as a cartoonist and illustrator, Giambarba was a regular contributor to Sports Illustrated, This Week, True and Spy. He was a member of the San Francisco Society of Illustrators during the nine years he lived in Sonoma County, California. Giambarba is the author of 13 books, founded the Scrimshaw Press and CapeArts Magazine, and was, with his wife, Fran, a founding partner of Arts & Flowers, publisher of botanically accurate greeting cards from 1985 through 1996. Giambarba's work was introduced at the International Center of Photography in New York City on 18 December 2009, a collection of 15 film and 3 camera packages for the Paul Giambarba Edition of Polaroid cameras and film commissioned by Dr. Florian Kaps, founder and director of The Impossible Project of Vienna, Austria.

Giambarba died in Mashpee, Massachusetts, on May 1, 2023, at the age of 94.

== Honors and awards ==
- Gold Medal, Art Directors Club of New York
- Certificates of Merit, Art Directors Club of New York
- Gold Medals, Art Directors Club of Boston
- Certificates of Merit, Art Directors Club of Boston
- Certificates of Excellence, American Institute of Graphic Arts Packaging 1972, 1974, 1976
- Andy Awards, Advertising Club of New York
- Hatch Awards, Advertising Club of Boston
- Certificate of Excellence of Design, Industrial Design magazine Annual Design Review

== Sources ==
- "The Branding of Polaroid: How we beat Eastman Kodak and its little yellow boxes in the marketplace despite a clunky product and an irrelevant corporate name. " blog - Polaroid's quest for a graphic design identity
- "100 Years of Illustration" blog
- Giambarba's caricatures
