= Mary Dagworthy James =

Hymn-writer

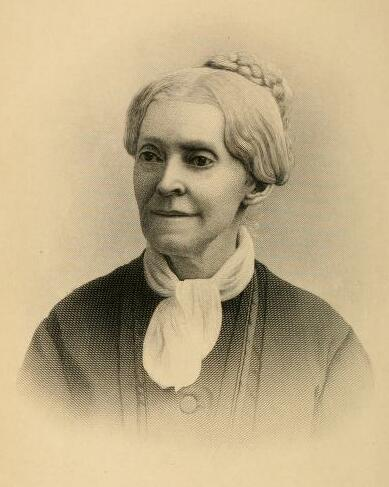
- Born: Mary Dagworthy Yard; August 7, 1810; Trenton, New Jersey, U.S.
- Died: October 4, 1883 (aged 73); New York City, New York, U.S.
- Other names: Mary Yard James
- Occupation: Hymnwriter

Mary Dagworthy Yard James (August 7, 1810 – October 4, 1883) was an American hymnwriter.

Mary Dagworthy Yard was born in Trenton, New Jersey, to a Quaker father and Baptist mother. She converted to Methodism as a child and began teaching Sunday school in the Methodist Episcopal church at the age of 13. In 1834, Yard married Henry B. James; and in 1853, she helped to found a home orphans. She became a leader in the Wesleyan Holiness Movement helping Phoebe Palmer, one of the founders of the movement; leading meetings; and writings roughly 50 hymns. She also wrote articles for publications such as Guide to Holiness, the New York Christian Advocate, The Contributor, The Christian Witness, The Christian Woman, The Christian Standard, and the Ocean Grove Record. She also wrote The Soul Winner in 1883.

James died on October 4, 1883, in New York City and is buried in her hometown of Trenton, New Jersey.
