= Henry Syverson =

American cartoonist (1918–2007

Henry Syverson (October 5, 1918, in Pine Bush, New York – August 12, 2007, in Pine Bush, New York) was an American cartoonist and illustrator, who contributed cartoons regularly to The Saturday Evening Post, This Week and many other periodicals.

In World War II PFC Hank Syverson served with the U.S. Army on Okinawa.

Syverson attended the Walt Disney Animation Studios in the company of many animators destined for fame in magazine cartooning – there were Sam Cobean and Eldon Dedini. Some graduated to syndicated fame, such as Walt Kelly (Pogo), Hank Ketcham (Dennis the Menace) and George Baker (Sad Sack).

One of my favorite influences is Henry Syverson. When I first saw his cartoons as a small boy in The Saturday Evening Post magazine, I had no idea he had once been a Disney artist, but when I learned that years later I wasn't surprised. His characters have the appeal and fluidity I associate with Disney, somehow coupled with a slightly more Thurber-esque abstraction. Like Walt Kelly, Hank Ketchum and other Disney alumni though, Syverson carved out a personal niche that is as unmistakeable as a signature.

— Will Finn (animator)

For thirty years I have pursued my favorite hobby -- at Walt Disney's Studios, then as a soldier-cartoonist (PFC Hank Syverson), and today, with my wife and two children contributing much inspiration, as a free-lance cartoonist. But perhaps to consider cartooning a hobby is deceiving. My son once asked me, 'Daddy, are you unemployed?'

— Henry Syverson

== Publications ==
- Post Scripts from the Saturday Evening Post – John Bailey, Henry Syverson (Macrae Smith, Philadelphia, 1952)
- The Saturday Evening Post Humour – John Bailey, Henry Syverson (Elek Books, London, 1956)
- Aesop's Fables
- Lovingly Yours – Henry Syverson (Henry Holt & Co., NY, 1957)
- Bed, Breakfast and Bottled Water: A Cautionary Travel Guide to Europe – Kenneth R. Morgan, Henry Syverson (William Morrow & Co., 1963)
- Touche – (C. R. Gibson Company, Norwalk, Connecticut, 1968)
- What's So Funny About That? (1950s)
- A Diabolical Dictionary of Education – Richard Armour, Henry Syverson (McGraw-Hill, 1969) ISBN 9780070022676
- The Spouse in the House – Richard Armour, Henry Syverson (McGraw-Hill, 1975) ISBN 0070022704 / 0-07-002270-4
