= Blessed Assurance =

Christian hymn

- Hymn
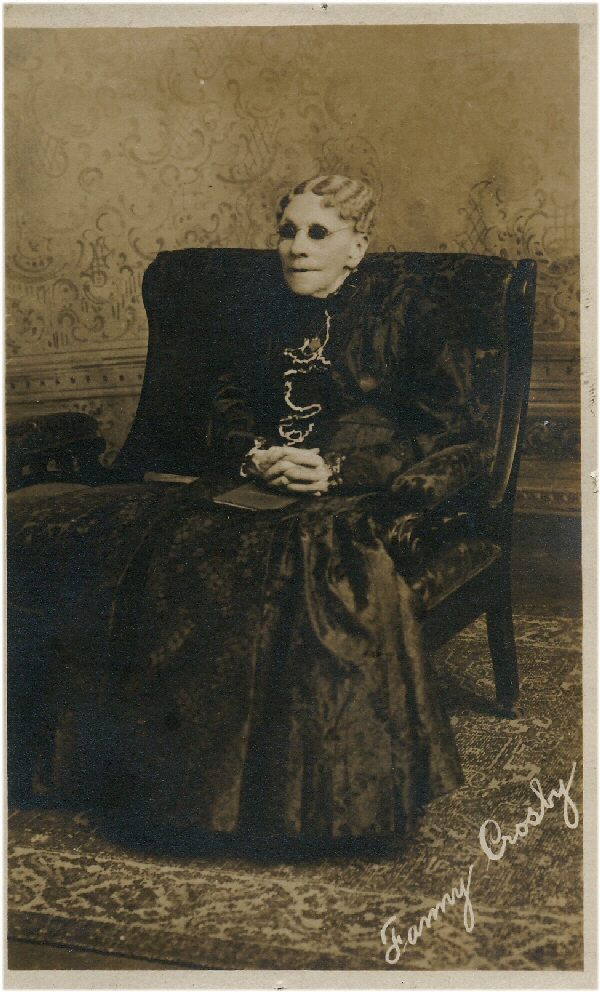
- Photograph of Fanny Crosby
- Text: by Fanny Crosby
- Meter: 9.10.9.9 with refrain
- Melody: "Assurance" by Phoebe Knapp
- Published: 1873

"Blessed Assurance" is a well-known Christian hymn. The lyrics were written in 1873 by blind hymn writer Fanny Crosby to the music written in 1873 by Phoebe Knapp.

== History ==
Crosby was visiting her friend Phoebe Knapp as the Knapp home was having a large pipe organ installed. The organ was incomplete, so Mrs. Knapp, using the piano, played a new melody she had just composed. When Knapp asked Crosby, "What do you think the tune says?", Crosby replied, "Blessed assurance; Jesus is mine."

The hymn appeared in the July 1873 issue of Palmer's Guide to Holiness and Revival Miscellany, a magazine printed by Dr. and Mrs. W. C. Palmer of 14 Bible House, New York City. It appeared on page 36 (the last page) with complete text and piano score, and indicated it had been copyrighted by Crosby that year. It is not certain that this was the first printing of the hymn, but it certainly helped to popularize what became one of the most beloved hymns of all time.

The popular song reflects Crosby's walk of faith, as expressed by the apostle Paul in Philippians

"For to me, to live is Christ and to die is gain" (Philippians 1:21).

Because of Crosby's lyrics, the tune is now called "Blessed Assurance". Many country and Gospel artists performed this hymn for decades including Gaither Vocal Band, Randy Travis, Alan Jackson and Carrie Underwood.

In 2026, Nigerian gospel artist Wealthykeyzz released a single titled "Sacred Echoes of Blessed Assurance" which is considered a modern interpretation of the hymn.

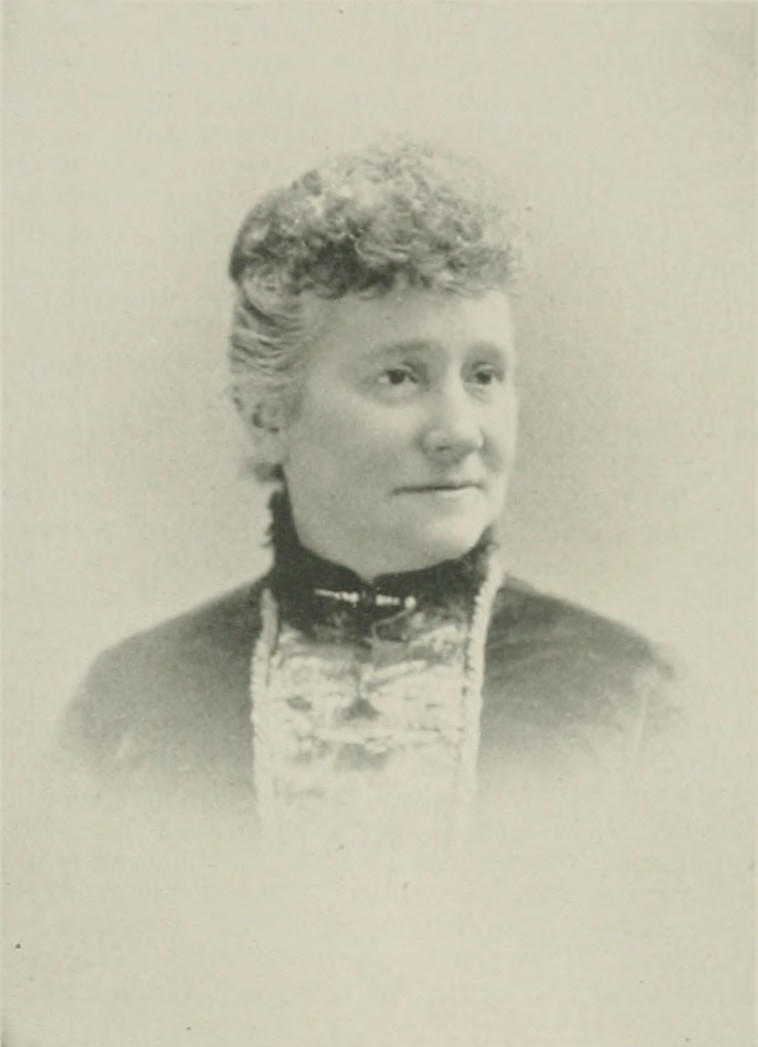
Phoebe Palmer Knapp

== See also ==
- Assurance (theology)
