= Phoebe Palmer =

Evangelist and writer

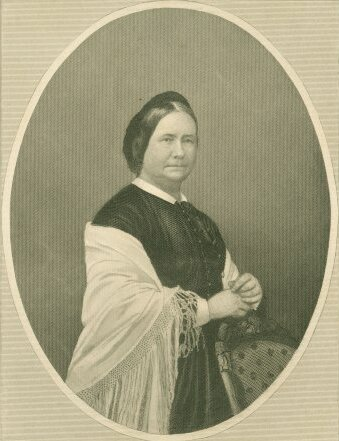
- Phoebe Palmer
- Born: Phoebe Worrall; December 18, 1807; New York City, U.S.
- Died: November 2, 1874 (aged 66)
- Occupations: evangelist and writer
- Known for: co-founder of the Holiness movement within Methodist Christianity
- Spouse: Walter C. Palmer
- Children: Phoebe Knapp
- Parent(s): Henry Worrall and Dorothea Wade Worrall

Phoebe Palmer (December 18, 1807 – November 2, 1874) was a Methodist evangelist and writer who promoted the doctrine of Christian perfection. She is considered one of the founders of the Holiness movement within Methodist Christianity.

== Early life ==
Palmer was born Phoebe Worrall in New York City. Her father was a devout Methodist named Henry Worrall. He had experienced a religious conversion during the Wesleyan Revival in England before immigrating to the United States. Phoebe's mother was Dorothea Wade Worrall.

== Spiritual development ==
In 1827 Phoebe Worrall married Walter Palmer, a homeopathic physician, who was also a devout Methodist. They regularly attended Allen Street Methodist Church in New York City. As Methodists, the couple became interested in the writings of the founder of Methodism, John Wesley. They developed a particular interest in Wesley's doctrine of Christian perfection, which is the belief that a Christian can live a life free of sin. On 26 July 1837, Phoebe Palmer experienced what John Wesley termed "entire sanctification." Other members of her family experienced this "sanctification" soon thereafter. They felt that they should teach others about that experience and teach them how to have it for themselves. As such, Phoebe Palmer often preached at Methodist churches and camp meetings.

== Spread of Holiness concepts ==
In 1835, Palmer's sister, Sarah Lankford, began having weekly prayer meetings with Methodist women. Two years later, Phoebe Palmer became the leader of the meetings, which were referred to as the Tuesday Meeting for the Promotion of Holiness. The meetings were held in the Palmer's home. She always refused to hold the Tuesday meetings anywhere but in a home (her house had to be enlarged to accommodate them).

Beginning in 1839, men were allowed to attend the meetings. Among the men were Methodist bishops, theologians, and ministers. Some of the bishops who attended were Edmund S. James, Leonidas Lent Hamline, Jesse T. Peck and Matthew Simpson. This renewed interest in Holiness eventually influenced the Methodist Church nationwide.

Phoebe Palmer and her husband Walter became itinerant preachers as they received more and more invitations from churches, conferences, and camp meetings. Although Walter Palmer spoke at these meetings, it was Phoebe who was better known. She played a significant role in spreading the concept of Christian holiness throughout the United States and the rest of the world.

She wrote several books, including The Way of Holiness, which was a foundational book in the Holiness movement. From the northeastern United States the movement spread. She and her husband visited other regions, then Canada in 1857, and then the United Kingdom in 1859. They stayed in the United Kingdom for several years.

The Palmers bought a monthly magazine entitled The Guide to Holiness in 1864. It had been started by Timothy Merritt to promote the doctrine of Christian perfection. Phoebe Palmer edited the magazine from that time until her death. Some of those whom Palmer influenced through her speaking and writing were temperance leader Frances Willard; the co-founder of the Salvation Army, Catherine Booth; and the first president of the National Camp Meeting Association for the Promotion of Holiness (later the Christian Holiness Partnership), John Swanel Inskip. While Phoebe Palmer remained committed to the Methodist tradition, her works also influenced the Higher Life movement.

In her book, The Promise of the Father, Palmer defended the idea of women in Christian ministry. Her belief in holiness was not merely theoretical. She led the Methodist Ladies' Home Missionary Society in founding the Five Points Mission in 1850. This mission was in a slum area in New York City.

Palmer's daughter, Phoebe Knapp, wrote several hymn tunes, including the melody for Fanny Crosby's "Blessed Assurance."

Palmer died of Bright's disease in 1874.

== Writings ==
- The Way of Holiness (1843) or or or
- Faith and its Effects (1848)

== See also ==
- Heath, Elaine A. Naked faith : the mystical theology of Phoebe Palmer (Eugene, Oregon: Pickwick Publications, 2009)
- Oden, Amy, In her own words: Women's writings in Christian Thought (Nashville, Abington Press, 1994)
- Oden, Thomas C. (ed.), Phoebe Palmer : selected writings (New York: Paulist Press, 1988)
- Raser, Harold E., Phoebe Palmer, Her Life and Thought Studies in Women and Religion, Volume 22, Edwin Mellen Press, Lewiston/Queenston, 1997.
- Reuther, Rosemary Radford and Rosemary Skinner Keller, Women and Religion in America: The Nineteenth Century. San Francisco, Harper and Row, 1981.
- Taylor, Marion (ed.), Handbook of Women Biblical Interpreters: a historical and biographical guide (2012)
- White, Charles Edward. The Beauty of Holiness: Phoebe Palmer as Theologian, Revivalist, Feminist, and Humanitarian (Zondervan/Francis Asbury Press, 1986). (ISBN 0-310-46250-9)
