= This Week (magazine) =

US nationally syndicated Sunday magazine

- McClelland Barclay cover for This Week (September 24, 1939)
- Editor: Marie Mattingly Meloney (1935–1943)
- Categories: news magazine, fiction
- Frequency: Weekly
- Publisher: Joseph P. Knapp
- Total circulation (1963): 14.6 million
- First issue: February 24, 1935
- Final issue: November 2, 1969
- Company: Publication Corporation
- Country: United States
- Based in: New York City, New York
- Language: English

This Week was a nationally syndicated Sunday magazine supplement that was included in American newspapers between 1935 and 1969. In the early 1950s, it accompanied 37 Sunday newspapers. A decade later, at its peak in 1963, This Week was distributed with the Sunday editions of 42 newspapers for a total circulation of 14.6 million.

It was the oldest syndicated newspaper supplement in the United States when it went out of business in 1969. It was distributed with the Los Angeles Times, The Dallas Morning News, The Plain Dealer (Cleveland, Ohio), the Boston Herald, and others. Magazine historian Phil Stephensen-Payne noted,

"It grew from a circulation of four million in 1935 to nearly 12 million in 1957, far outstripping other fiction-carrying weeklies such as Collier's, Liberty and even The Saturday Evening Post (all of which eventually folded)."

== History ==
=== Foundation and early years ===
This Week was being published as the New York Herald Tribune Sunday Magazine when publisher Joseph P. Knapp changed its name and began to syndicate it to other newspapers. The first issue appeared on February 24, 1935. The magazine's editor at the time was Marie Mattingly "Missy" Meloney, who professionally went by the name "Mrs. William Brown Meloney"; she had been editing the Herald Tribune's Sunday magazine since 1926. In The New York Times, Henry Raymont wrote:

During the early years, This Week's editorial content was made up mainly of fiction articles by such major writers as Sax Rohmer, Erle Stanley Gardner, Pearl Buck, P. G. Wodehouse and Bruce Catton. It also published articles on national affairs by such major writers as former President Herbert Hoover, Adlai Stevenson II, Richard Nixon, and Nelson Rockefeller. — H. Raymont (1969)

=== Peak ===
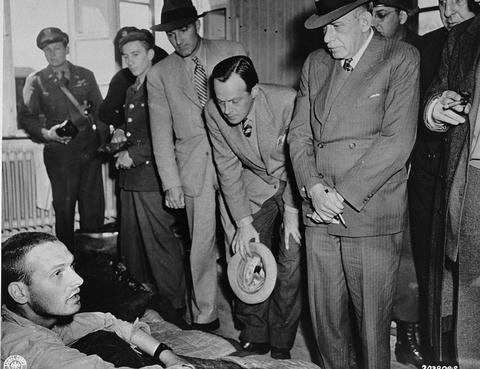
American newspaper editors speak with survivors at a hospital in the newly liberated Buchenwald concentration camp, April 1945. Left to right: Norman Chandler, Los Angeles Times; William I. Nichols (leaning forward, center), This Week magazine; and Julius Ochs Adler, The New York Times.

In 1942, This Week cut its size down and eliminated run-overs onto back pages. It also changed to including 52% articles and 48% fiction; at one time it had contained 80% fiction.

William I. Nichols became editor of the magazine in June 1943, just before the death of Meloney the same month, and a year later the magazine started to turn a profit. In 1948, This Week surpassed the American Weekly as the American newspaper supplement with the largest advertising revenue. Nichols turned the financial fortunes of This Week around by "shun[ning] anything controversial":

"I'm neither pious nor preachy, but my first principle is success and [decency] has paid off in success. You can bore a mass audience to death with acres of flesh. Why did burlesque die?" — W.I. Nichols (1949)

By 1963, This Week reached its highest circulation.

=== Demise ===
Later, This Week was owned by Publication Corporation, which was taken over by Crowell, Collier & Macmillan in a January 1968 merger, but the magazine was "already fighting for survival". William Woestendiek, former editor of IBM's Think magazine and former city editor of The Houston Post, was brought in to revamp the editorial format. "We tried hard to turn out a better editorial product," an unnamed Crowell, Coller executive told The New York Times. "We succeeded in doing it, but nobody wanted it."

The merged company

"began to subsidize the magazine last May [1969] in the hope of restoring circulation, build advertising and make it a self-sustaining enterprise by Aug. 1".

That effort was unsuccessful, and subscribing newspapers, with the then-total circulation of 9.9 million, were offered the opportunity to keep the supplement going by paying about $5 for 1,000 copies. The attempt was fruitless, said Fred H. Stapleford, president and publisher of United Newspaper Corporation, and he announced that the last number would be issued on November 2, 1969. In a letter to the subscriber newspapers, he said:

I deeply regret having to advise you that the necessary circulation commitment cannot be attained. It is a pity that This Week, so long a distinguished member of the newspaper family, evidently has outlasted its economic usefulness to newspapers and advertisers ... We believe it would be foolhardy to continue publishing when all the vital signs are negative. — F.H. Stapleford (1969)

A memorandum to the 160 This Week employees pledged that

"every effort would be made to find [them] jobs in other publications of Crowell, Collier, one of the nation's largest book publishing and educational business concerns."

== Contributors ==
=== Cartoonists ===
The numerous cartoonists who contributed to This Week included Irwin Caplan, Dick Cavalli, Chon Day, Robert Day, Rowland Emett, Paul Giambarba, Tom Henderson, Bil Keane, Bill King, Clyde Lamb, Harry Mace, Roy McKie, Ronald Searle, Vahan Shirvanian, Ton Smits, Ralph Stein, Henry Syverson, George Wolfe and Bill Yates. Giambarba's series of Angelino cartoons ran in This Week during the late 1950s. Caplan contributed a regular weekly thematic grouping of cartoons, sometimes in the form of a vertical comic strip.

Cartoonist Stein was also This Week's Auto Editor, expanding his material into a book, This Week's Glove-Compartment Auto Book (Random House, 1964). Crockett Johnson created The Saga of Quilby: A ghost story especially devised for advertisers who stay up late (1955), a pamphlet designed to sell advertising space in This Week. A collection of cartoons included a dozen profiles of the magazine's cartoonists and an article on cartoon devices and terminology by Mort Walker.

Many cartoons in This Week were devised by gagwriter Bob McCully. One writer noted about him:

McCully sends his cartoon ideas out on small 6×3½ inch cards, using a minimum of words. Here's how the card read which he submitted with an idea that eventually appeared as a cartoon in This Week magazine.

Scene: Four garbagemen are standing beside the garbage can in the backyard of a house. Each one is holding his cap in his hand. The lady of the house is standing nearby. She seems embarrassed as one of the garbagemen says:

Title: "... and so we're proud to announce that you've been selected as Miss Sanitary Garbage Can of 1949."

=== Writers ===
Contributors to This Week included:

- Agatha Christie
- Arthur C. Clarke
- C.H. Garrigues
- Erle Stanley Gardner
- John Foster Dulles
- Wilferd Arlan Peterson
- Ellery Queen
