= Mary A. Kidder =

American hymn writer (1820– 1905)

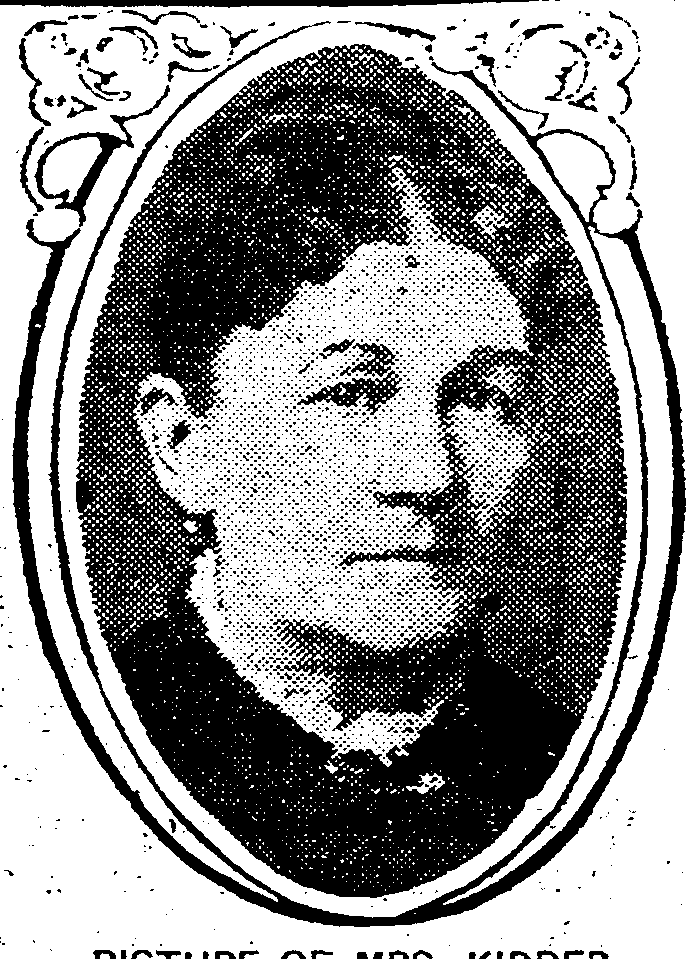
Mary A. Kidder

Mary Ann Pepper Kidder (March 16, 1820 – November 25, 1905) was an American prolific hymnwriter who is considered to have composed “about a thousand hymns” during her lifetime. She was a member of Methodist Episcopal Church.

== Biography ==
Born as Mary Ann Pepper on March 16, 1820, in Boston, Massachusetts, Mary Ann Pepper Kidder was the daughter of master mariner Daniel Freeman Pepper and his wife Betsey Burke. She started writing poetry at an early age, and wrote pseudonym Minnie Waters. When she was sixteen years, she lost her sight. However, it was restored after about a year.

In 1844, she was married to Ellis Usher Kidder, a music publisher. She also wrote short stories and articles. Her works were periodically published in The New York Ledger, Waverly Magazine, New York Fireside Companion, Demorest's Monthly, Packard's Monthly, and New York Weekly.

She lived 46 years in New York City. She died on November 25, 1905, at the home of her brother, Daniel W. Pepper, in Chelsea, Massachusetts.
