= Farm & Fireside =

Semi-monthly national farming magazine from 1877 until 1939

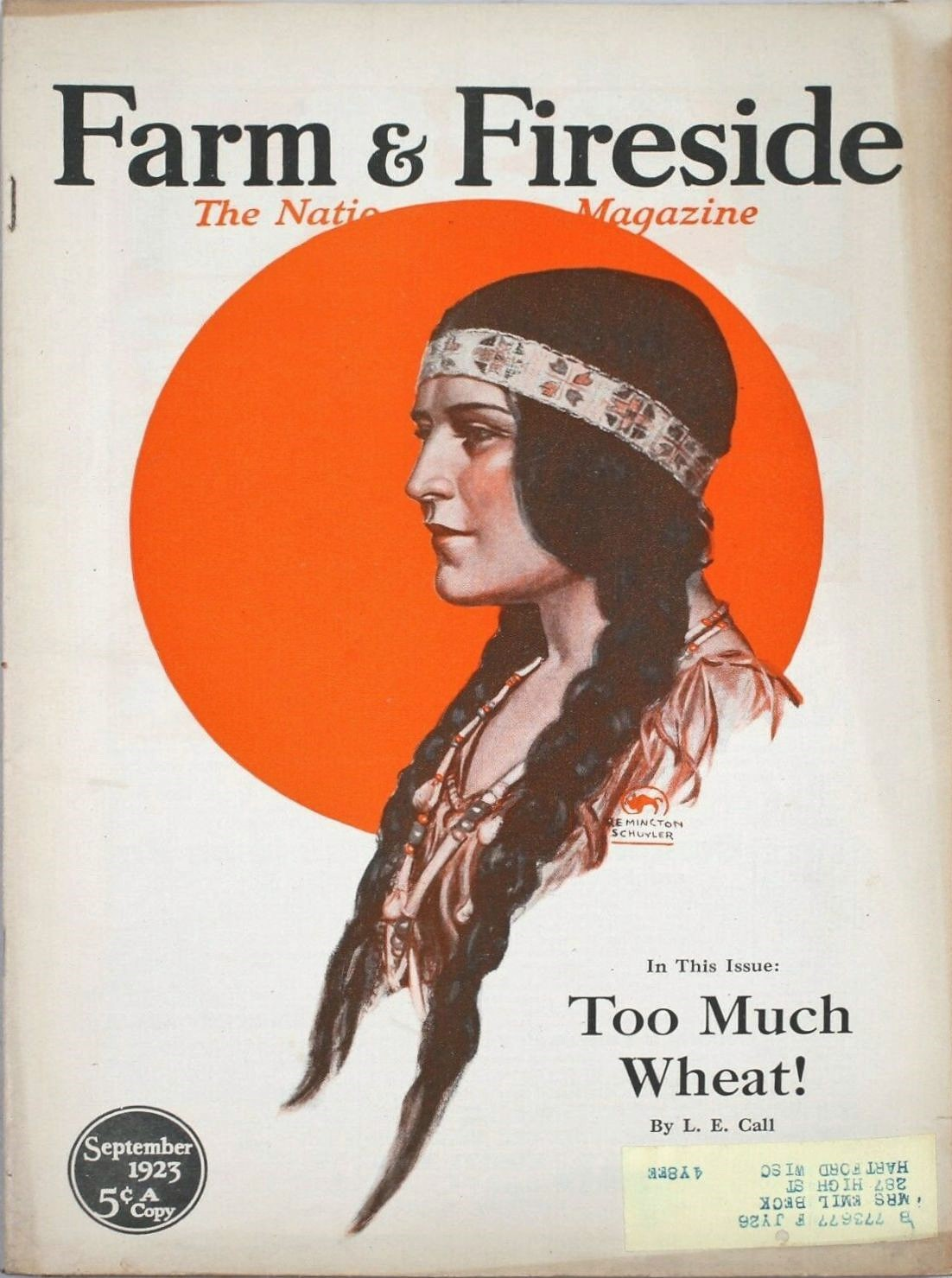
- Farm & Fireside magazine, September 1923, cover bearing painting of Atalie Unkalunt by Remington Schuyler.
- Categories: Agriculture
- Frequency: Semimonthly
- Founded: 1877
- Final issue Number: 1939
- Company: Crowell-Collier Publishing Company
- Country: United States
- Based in: Springfield, Ohio
- Language: English

Farm & Fireside was a semi-monthly national farming magazine that was established in 1877 and was published until 1939. From 1909 to 1916 its editor was the author Herbert Quick. It was based in Springfield, Ohio.

It was the original magazine for what eventually became the Crowell-Collier Publishing Company. It was renamed The Country Home in an attempt to compete with Better Homes and Gardens, with the issue of February 1930. The reasons behind the name change were given in the January 1930 issue. It stated that modern-day farmers are taking on a wider range of interests to improve their quality of life. Hence, they want more articles on household tips and entertainment.
