= Kerry Ellis discography =

Discography of British stage actress and singer Kerry Ellis

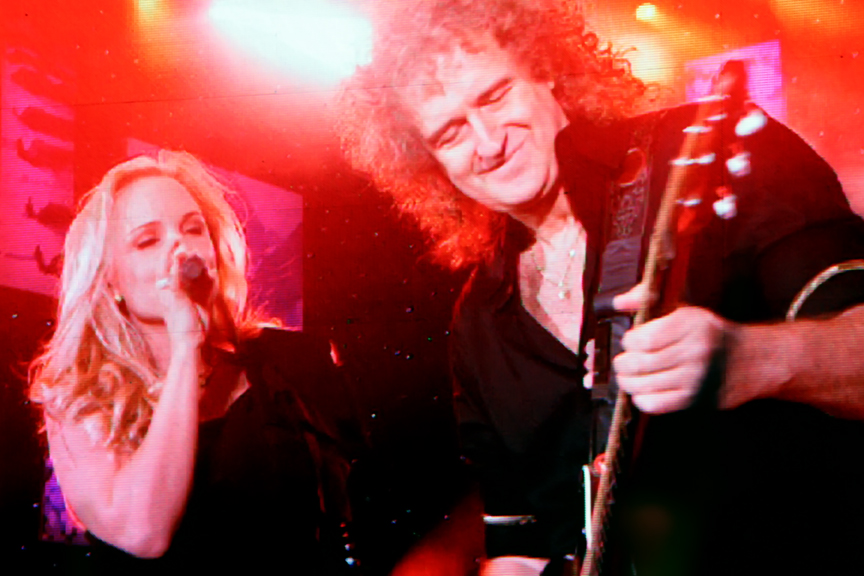
- Ellis and Brian May performing at BBC's Proms in the Park (2010)
- Studio albums: 4
- Extended plays: 1
- Soundtrack albums: 3
- Live albums: 1
- Singles: 5

The discography of Kerry Ellis, a British stage actress and singer, consists of four studio albums, one extended play, three cast recordings, and five singles. Her debut album Anthems was released in September 2010.

== Albums ==
=== Studio albums ===
Year	Album details	Peak chart positions
Year	Album details	UK
2010	Anthems: Released: 13 September 2010; Label: Decca, Universal; Formats: CD, digital download	15
2014	Kerry Ellis: Released: 14 September 2014; Label: Decca, Universal; Formats: CD, digital download	-
2017	Golden Days (with Brian May): Released: 7 April 2017; Label: Sony Music; Formats: CD, LP, digital download	-
2020	Feels Like Home: Released: 21 February 2020; Label: Auburn Jam Records; Formats: CD	-
2023	Kings & Queens: Released: 12 May 2023; Label: Westway Music; Formats: CD, digital download	-

=== Extended plays ===
Year	Album details
2008	Wicked in Rock: Released: 7 July 2008; Label: Duck Productions; Formats: 12" vinyl, CD, digital download

=== Soundtracks ===
Year	Album details	Notes
2001	My My Fair Lady (2001 London Cast Recording): Released: 23 July 2001; Label: First Night; Formats: CD	Ellis is featured as part of the ensemble.
2003	We Will Rock You (The Original London Cast Recording): Released: 26 May 2003; Label: EMI; Formats: CD, digital download	Ellis is featured on tracks "I Want It All", "Headlong" and "No-One But You (Only the Good Die Young)".; This is a live recording taken from performances at the Dominion Theatre.
2009	Chess in Concert: Released: 16 June 2009; Label: Reprise Records; Formats: CD, digital download	Ellis is featured on tracks "Someone Else's Story", "The Deal (No Deal)", "I Know Him So Well" and "Endgame (Part 3)".; This is a live recording taken from the two performances of Chess in Concert at the Royal Albert Hall in May 2008.

=== Live albums ===
Year	Album details
2009	Champions of Rock: Released: 10 April 2009; Label: Unknown; Formats: CD
2013	Acoustic by Candlelight (with Brian May): Released: 17 June 2013; Label: Decca, Universal; Formats: CD, digital download

== Singles ==
Year	Single	Peak chart positions	Album
Year	Single	UK	Album
2005	"No-One but You (Only the Good Die Young)"	—	Wicked in Rock
2010	"I'm Not that Girl"	—	Anthems
2010	"Anthem"	—	Anthems
2011	"Defying Gravity" (G-A-Y remix)	—	Non-album single
2012	"Born Free"	—	""Born Free Live (Acoustic and by Candlelight)""
2013	"The Kissing Me Song"		""Born Free Live (Acoustic and by Candlelight)""
"—" denotes releases that did not chart.

=== As a featured artist ===
Year	Single	Peak chart positions	Album
Year	Single	UK	Album
2008	"Behind these Walls" (with Scott Alan)	—	Keys: The Music of Scott Alan
2009	"Somebody to Love" (with Only Men Aloud!)	—	Band of Brothers
2010	"Wind Beneath My Wings" (with RAF Central Band)	—	Reach for the Skies
2010	"Come What May" (duet with Alfie Boe)	—	Bring Him Home
2012	"Never Neverland (Fly Away)" (with Scott Alan)	—	Scott Alan: LIVE
"—" denotes releases that did not chart.

== Videography ==
=== Music videos ===
Year	Title	Director(s)	Notes
2008	"Defying Gravity"	DAVE School	Student-made
2010	"I'm Not that Girl"	Unknown	Currently unreleased
2013	"The Kissing Me Song"	Fan Made	Queen Official
2015	"One Voice"	Unknown	with Brian May
