= Kerry Ellis Sings the Great British Songbook =

2009 concert tour by Kerry Ellis

Anthems: The Tour
- Tour by Kerry Ellis
- The promotional leaflet for the 2009 concerts
- Start date: 20 June 2009
- End date: 26 June 2009
- No. of shows: 4

Kerry Ellis concert chronology
- Kerry Ellis Sings the Great British Songbook (2009); Anthems: The Tour (2011)

Kerry Ellis Sings the Great British Songbook was the first set of solo concerts by English stage actress and singer Kerry Ellis. The tour, comprising dates at the Shaw Theatre in London in June 2009, saw her through a set list of more than 20 numbers with an encore that included Brian May.

== Setlist ==
Kerry Ellis Sings the Great British Songbook

20 June 2009 – 26 June 2009

ACT 1

1. Greatest Day
2. Somebody to Love
3. Andrew Lloyd Webber medley

- Unexpected Song
- Tell Me on a Sunday
- Don't Cry for Me Argentina
- Memory

4. Lost in Translation
5. James Bond medley

- Diamonds are Forever
- A View to a Kill
- Goldfinger
- Live and Let Die

6. Annie Lennox / Eurythmics medley

- Why
- Here Comes the Rain Again
- Walking on Broken Glass
- Sweet Dreams (Are Made of This)
- There Must Be an Angel (Playing with My Heart)

7. Rule the World

ACT 2

1. Rain on Your Parade (Duffy)
2. A&E
3. Boyband medley

- The Scientist
- You Give Me Something
- Fix You

4. New York medley

- Englishman in New York
- Without You
- Love It When You Call

5. Chasing Cars
6. Snow

ENCORE

1. Who Wants to Live Forever

2. Crazy Little Thing Called Love

== Tour dates ==
Date	City	Country	Venue
20 June 2009	London	England	Shaw Theatre
21 June 2009	London	England	Shaw Theatre
25 June 2009	London	England	Shaw Theatre
26 June 2009	London	England	Shaw Theatre
