= Golden Days (Brian May and Kerry Ellis album) =

Studio album by Brian May and Kerry Ellis
- Released: 7 April 2017
- Studios: Allerton Hill, England; CNSO Recording Studio, Prague; Sound Check Studios; Priory Recording Studios, Birmingham
- Genres: Easy listening, pop rock
- Label: Sony Music
- Producers: Brian May and Kerry Ellis

Brian May and Kerry Ellis chronology
Acoustic by Candlelight (2013)	Golden Days (2017)

Brian May chronology
Furia (2000)	Golden Days (2017)

Kerry Ellis chronology
Kerry Ellis (2014)	Golden Days (2017)

Professional ratings
Review scores
Source	Rating
AllMusic	3.5/5 stars
South London Press	5/5 stars
The Times	2/5 stars
The Reviews Hub	3/5 stars
TeamRock	3.5/5 stars

Golden Days is the second album released by the duo Brian May and Kerry Ellis. Their first album together as a duo was Acoustic by Candlelight, which is a live album, although they first worked together on Ellis' second studio album Anthems, which May produced. The album was first released on 7 April 2017 and reached number 27 in the UK Albums Chart.

== Release and critical reception ==
The album was originally to be called Anthems II, named after Ellis' album Anthems, which May produced and wrote or co-wrote five of the songs. It was scheduled to be released in March 2017. The release date changed to 7 April 2017 as did the album title to Golden Days

In a press release, May said of the album:

This album is a true collaboration between Kerry and myself. Five years ago, Anthems was the result of me producing an exciting new artist – Kerry Ellis. This new record has both our names on it, and breaks new ground. We produced ourselves together as a team. I feel confident it's the best thing we've ever done and a worthy testament to 13 years of belief. It also happens to feature Britain's most beautiful voice!

The album entered the UK Albums Chart on 20 April 2017 and climbed to number 27 and spent just one week on the charts.

Upon its release, Golden Days received mixed reviews from music critics. Nicky Sweetland of the South London Press wrote "This album is another triumph for the team of May and Ellis and is almost guaranteed to be a hit" and gave it five stars. While Helen Jones of The Reviews Hub wrote, "Overall this is a pleasant and easy to listen to album that has a couple of outstanding cover tracks, nice album but not the most memorable".

== Track listing ==
No.	Title	Writer(s)	Length
1.	"Love in a Rainbow"	Kerry Ellis; Brian May	4:30
2.	"Roll with You"	Ellis; May	3:54
3.	"Golden Days"	May	4:21
4.	"It's Gonna Be All Right (The Panic Attack Song)"	May	3:45
5.	"Amazing Grace"	John Newton	2:48
6.	"One Voice"	Ruth Moody	3:21
7.	"If I Loved You"	Richard Rodgers; Oscar Hammerstein II	3:33
8.	"Born Free"	John Barry; Don Black	3:11
9.	"Parisienne Walkways"	Phil Lynott; Gary Moore	3:43
10.	"I Who Have Nothing"	Carlo Donida; Mogol; Jerry Leiber and Mike Stoller	4:07
11.	"The Kissing Me Song"	Ellis; May	3:43
12.	"Story of a Heart"	Benny Andersson; Björn Ulvaeus	4:22
13.	"Can't Help Falling in Love"	Hugo Peretti; Luigi Creatore; George David Weiss	3:13

== Credits and personnel ==
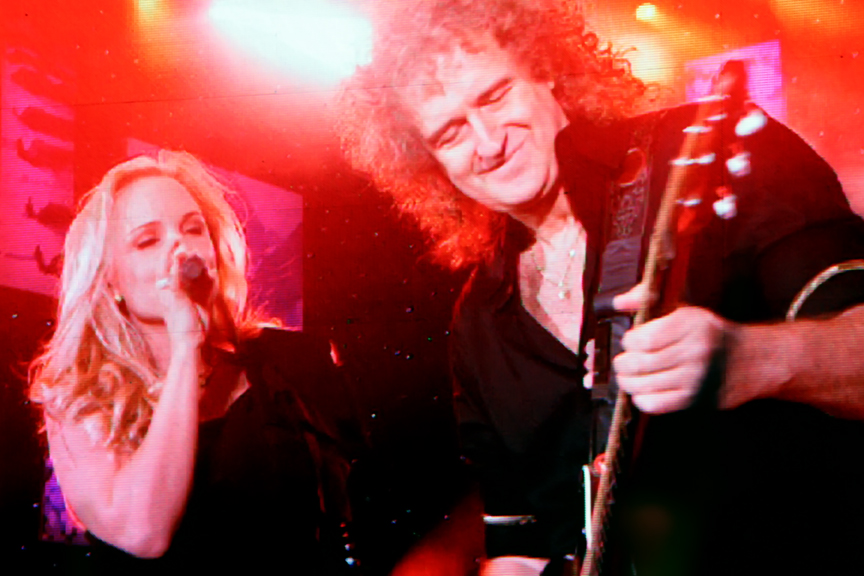
Kerry Ellis and Brian May

- Kerry Ellis – lead and backing vocals
- Brian May – Guitar, vocals, keyboards, sitar, gayageum, bass guitar, arrangements
- Neil Fairclough – Bass guitar
- Justin Shirley-Smith – Engineer
- Kris Fredriksson – Engineer
- John Miceli – Drums, Engineer (additional)
- Rufus Taylor – Drums
- Josh Macrae – Engineer (additional)
- Stanislav Barochy – Engineer (additional)
- Jeff Leach – Keyboards (additional)
