= The Born Free Tour =

2012–13 concert tour by Kerry Ellis

- Tour by Kerry Ellis
- Promotional image for the first leg of Ellis' tour in 2012
- Start date: 5 November 2012
- End date: 17 July 2013
- Legs: 3
- No. of shows: 28

Kerry Ellis concert chronology
- Anthems: The Tour (2011); The Born Free Tour (2012–13)

The Born Free Tour is the second headlining concert tour by English stage actress and singer Kerry Ellis with Brian May. The original 2012 tour comprised 11 dates in and around the home counties of England, beginning on 5 November 2012 at the Apex in Bury St Edmunds, and finishing at the Swan Theatre in High Wycombe.

A second leg will tour further venues in England, and also visit Ireland and Wales. It will begin on 17 June 2013 at St John Evangelist Church, Oxford, and finish at the Dublin Olympia on 30 June 2013. A third leg will see Ellis and May taking The Born Free Tour to mainland Europe, for one date in France, one in Austria and four in Italy in July 2013.

Unlike the previously extravagant Anthems: The Tour (2011), this tour is presented as a series of intimate and acoustic shows performed under candlelight where the pair perform to raise awareness of their work for the Born Free Foundation. Receiving positive reviews, the tour was complimented by critics for the pairing of May's sound and Ellis' vocals.

Ellis and May released a live album from the first leg of The Born Free Tour, Acoustic by Candlelight, available digitally, on CD, and on vinyl. The album was released on 17 June 2013 to coincide with the second leg of the tour.

== Tour dates ==
Date	City	Country	Venue
First leg
5 November 2012	Bury St Edmunds	England	The Apex
6 November 2012	Leamington Spa	England	Leamington Assembly Halls
7 November 2012	Corby	England	Corby Cube
9 November 2012	Tunbridge Wells	England	Assembly Hall Theatre
10 November 2012	Brighton	England	St George's Church
11 November 2012	London	England	Union Chapel
12 November 2012	St Albans	England	St. Alban's Arena
15 November 2012	Crawley	England	Hawth Theatre
16 November 2012	Portsmouth	England	New Theatre Royal
17 November 2012	Salisbury	England	Salisbury Playhouse
19 November 2012	High Wycombe	England	Wycombe Swan
Second leg
17 June 2013	Oxford	England	St John Evangelist Church
18 June 2013	Bournemouth	England	Pavilion Theatre
19 June 2013	Basingstoke	England	The Anvil
21 June 2013	Northampton	England	Royal & Derngate
23 June 2013	Liverpool	England	Philharmonic Hall
24 June 2013	Birmingham	England	Birmingham Town Hall
25 June 2013	Salford	England	The Lowry
26 June 2013	Gateshead	England	The Sage Gateshead
28 June 2013	Malvern	England	Malvern Theatre
29 June 2013	Llandudno	Wales	Venue Cymru
30 June 2013	Dublin	Ireland	Olympia Theatre
Third leg
8 July 2013	Paris	France	La Cigale
13 July 2013	Sogliano al Rubicone	Italy	Piazza Matteotti
14 July 2013	Pescara	Italy	Teatro d’Annunzio
15 July 2013	Klagenfurt	Austria	Wörtherseebühne
16 July 2013	Grado	Italy	Diga Nazario Sauro
17 July 2013	Milan	Italy	Auditorium di Milano
19 July 2013	Montreux	Switzerland	Stravinski Auditorium

== Setlist ==
=== First leg ===
5 November 2012
1. "Born Free"
2. "I Loved A Butterfly"
3. "I (Who Have Nothing)"
4. "Dust in the Wind"
5. "Cosi Celeste"
6. "Somebody to Love"
7. "Nothing Really Has Changed"
8. "Life Is Real"
9. "The Way We Were"
10. "Since You've Been Gone"
11. "'39"
12. "Something"
13. "Love Of My Life"
14. "I'm Not That Girl"
15. "No-One but You (Only the Good Die Young)"
16. "Last Horizon"
17. "Tie Your Mother Down"
18. "Can't Be Your Friend"
19. "Knockin' on Heaven's Door"
20. "We Will Rock You"
21. "We Are the Champions"

Encore

22. "Born Free"
23. "Crazy Little Thing Called Love"
6 November 2012
1. "Born Free"
2. "I Loved A Butterfly"
3. "I (Who Have Nothing)"
4. "Dust in the Wind"
5. "Cosi Celeste"
6. "Somebody to Love"
7. "Nothing Really Has Changed"
8. "Life Is Real"
9. "The Way We Were"
10. "'39"
11. "Something"
12. "Love Of My Life"
13. "I'm Not That Girl"
14. "No-One but You (Only the Good Die Young)"
15. "Last Horizon"
16. "Tie Your Mother Down"
17. "Can't Be Your Friend"
18. "We Will Rock You"
19. "We Are the Champions"

Encore

20. "Born Free"
21. "Crazy Little Thing Called Love"
7 November 2012
1. "Born Free"
2. "I Loved A Butterfly"
3. "I (Who Have Nothing)"
4. "Dust in the Wind"
5. "Cosi Celeste"
6. "Somebody to Love"
7. "Nothing Really Has Changed"
8. "Life Is Real"
9. "The Way We Were"
10. "'39"
11. "Something"
12. "Love Of My Life"
13. "I'm Not That Girl"
14. "No-One but You (Only the Good Die Young)"
15. "Last Horizon"
16. "Tie Your Mother Down"
17. "Can't Be Your Friend"
18. "We Will Rock You"
19. "We Are the Champions"

Encore

20. "Born Free"
21. "Crazy Little Thing Called Love"

9 November 2012
1. "Born Free"
2. "I Loved A Butterfly"
3. "I (Who Have Nothing)"
4. "Dust in the Wind"
5. "Cosi Celeste"
6. "Somebody to Love"
7. "Nothing Really Has Changed"
8. "Life Is Real"
9. "The Way We Were"
10. "'39"
11. "Something"
12. "Love Of My Life"
13. "I'm Not That Girl"
14. "No-One but You (Only the Good Die Young)"
15. "Last Horizon"
16. "Tie Your Mother Down"
17. "Can't Be Your Friend"
18. "We Will Rock You"
19. "We Are the Champions"

Encore

20. "Born Free"
21. "Crazy Little Thing Called Love"
10 November 2012
1. "Born Free"
2. "I Loved A Butterfly"
3. "I (Who Have Nothing)"
4. "Dust in the Wind"
5. "Kissing Me"
6. "Somebody to Love"
7. "Nothing Really Has Changed"
8. "Life Is Real"
9. "The Way We Were"
10. "Since You've Been Gone"
11. "'39"
12. "Something"
13. "Love Of My Life"
14. "I'm Not That Girl"
15. "No-One but You (Only the Good Die Young)"
16. "Last Horizon"
17. "Tie Your Mother Down"
18. "Can't Be Your Friend"
19. "Knockin' on Heaven's Door"
20. "We Will Rock You"
21. "We Are the Champions"

Encore

22. "In the Bleak Midwinter"
23. "Born Free"
24. "Crazy Little Thing Called Love"
11 November 2012
1. "Born Free"
2. "I Loved A Butterfly"
3. "I (Who Have Nothing)"
4. "Dust in the Wind"
5. "Kissing Me"
6. "Somebody to Love"
7. "Nothing Really Has Changed"
8. "Life Is Real"
9. "The Way We Were"
10. "Since You've Been Gone"
11. "'39"
12. "Something"
13. "Love Of My Life"
14. "I'm Not That Girl"
15. "No-One but You (Only the Good Die Young)"
16. "Last Horizon"
17. "Tie Your Mother Down"
18. "Can't Be Your Friend"
19. "Knockin' on Heaven's Door"
20. "We Will Rock You"
21. "We Are the Champions"

Encore

22. "In the Bleak Midwinter"
23. "Born Free"
24. "Crazy Little Thing Called Love"

12 November 2012
1. "Born Free"
2. "I Loved A Butterfly"
3. "I (Who Have Nothing)"
4. "Dust in the Wind"
5. "Kissing Me"
6. "Somebody to Love"
7. "Nothing Really Has Changed"
8. "Life Is Real"
9. "The Way We Were"
10. "Since You've Been Gone"
11. "'39"
12. "Something"
13. "Love Of My Life"
14. "I'm Not That Girl"
15. "No-One but You (Only the Good Die Young)"
16. "Last Horizon"
17. "Tie Your Mother Down"
18. "Can't Be Your Friend"
19. "Knockin' on Heaven's Door"
20. "We Will Rock You"
21. "We Are the Champions"

Encore

22. "In the Bleak Midwinter"
23. "Born Free"
24. "Crazy Little Thing Called Love"
15 November 2012
1. "Born Free"
2. "I Loved A Butterfly"
3. "I (Who Have Nothing)"
4. "Dust in the Wind"
5. "Kissing Me"
6. "Somebody to Love"
7. "Nothing Really Has Changed"
8. "Life Is Real"
9. "The Way We Were"
10. "Since You've Been Gone"
11. "'39"
12. "Something"
13. "Love Of My Life"
14. "I'm Not That Girl"
15. "No-One but You (Only the Good Die Young)"
16. "Last Horizon"
17. "Tie Your Mother Down"
18. "Can't Be Your Friend"
19. "Knockin' on Heaven's Door"
20. "We Will Rock You"
21. "We Are the Champions"

Encore

22. "In the Bleak Midwinter"
23. "Born Free"
24. "Crazy Little Thing Called Love"
16 November 2012
1. "Born Free"
2. "I Loved A Butterfly"
3. "I (Who Have Nothing)"
4. "Dust in the Wind"
5. "Kissing Me"
6. "Somebody to Love"
7. "Nothing Really Has Changed"
8. "Life Is Real"
9. "The Way We Were"
10. "'39"
11. "Something"
12. "Love Of My Life"
13. "I'm Not That Girl"
14. "Can't Be Your Friend"
15. "Good Company
16. "Tie Your Mother Down"
17. "No-One but You (Only the Good Die Young)"
18. "We Will Rock You"
19. "We Are the Champions"

Encore

20. "In the Bleak Midwinter"
21. "Born Free"
22. "Crazy Little Thing Called Love"

17 November 2012
1. "Born Free"
2. "I Loved A Butterfly"
3. "I (Who Have Nothing)"
4. "Dust in the Wind"
5. "Kissing Me"
6. "Somebody to Love"
7. "Nothing Really Has Changed"
8. "Life Is Real"
9. "The Way We Were"
10. "'39"
11. "Something"
12. "Love Of My Life"
13. "I'm Not That Girl"
14. "Can't Be Your Friend"
15. "Good Company
16. "Tie Your Mother Down"
17. "No-One but You (Only the Good Die Young)"
18. "We Will Rock You"
19. "We Are the Champions"

Encore

20. "In the Bleak Midwinter"
21. "Born Free"
22. "Crazy Little Thing Called Love"
19 November 2012
1. "Born Free"
2. "I Loved A Butterfly"
3. "I (Who Have Nothing)"
4. "Dust in the Wind"
5. "Kissing Me"
6. "Somebody to Love"
7. "Nothing Really Has Changed"
8. "Life Is Real"
9. "The Way We Were"
10. "'39"
11. "Something"
12. "Love Of My Life"
13. "I'm Not That Girl"
14. "Can't Be Your Friend"
15. "Good Company
16. "Tie Your Mother Down"
17. "No-One but You (Only the Good Die Young)"
18. "We Will Rock You"
19. "We Are the Champions"

Encore

20. "In the Bleak Midwinter"
21. "Born Free"
22. "Crazy Little Thing Called Love"

== Acoustic by Candlelight ==
Acoustic by Candlelight: Live on the Born Free tour

Live album by Kerry Ellis and Brian May
- Released: 17 June 2013
- Recorded: 2012
- Genre: Acoustic rock
- Label: Duck Productions
- Producer: Brian May

Kerry Ellis and Brian May chronology
Acoustic by Candlelight: Live on the Born Free tour (2013)	Golden Days (2017)

Brian May chronology
Furia (2000)	Acoustic by Candlelight (2013)

Kerry Ellis chronology
Anthems (2010)	Acoustic by Candlelight (2013)	Kerry Ellis (2014)

Acoustic by Candlelight: Live on the Born Free tour is the first live album by Ellis and May, released on 17 June 2013. The 15-track album consists of material from live shows of the first leg of the tour.

=== Track listing ===
Standard edition
No.	Title	Length
1.	"Born Free" (originally by Matt Monro)	3:17
2.	"I Loved a Butterfly" (originally by Queen + Paul Rodgers)	4:48
3.	"I (Who Have Nothing)" (originally by Ben E. King)	3:44
4.	"Dust in the Wind" (originally by Kansas)	4:21
5.	"The Kissing Me Song" (*)	4:25
6.	"Nothing Really Has Changed" (originally written by Virginia McKenna)	4:55
7.	"Life is Real" (†)	4:30
8.	"The Way We Were" (originally by Barbra Streisand)	3:43
9.	"Something" (originally by The Beatles)	4:31
10.	"Love of My Life" (†)	4:37
11.	"I'm Not that Girl" (from the musical Wicked)	3:25
12.	"I Can't Be Your Friend" (*)	4:31
13.	"In the Bleak Midwinter" (traditional Christmas carol)	3:44
14.	"Crazy Little Thing Called Love" (†)	3:46
15.	"No-One but You (Only the Good Die Young)" (†)	6:04

Notes:

- (*) Original songs written by Ellis and May
- (†) Songs originally by Queen

=== Release history ===
Region	Date	Format	Label	Edition	Catalog
United Kingdom	17 June 2013	CD	Duck Productions	Standard	
United Kingdom	24 June 2013	Vinyl, digital download	Duck Productions	Standard	
United States	6 August 2013	Digital download	Duck Productions	Standard	
