= Anthems: The Tour =

2011 concert tour by Kerry Ellis

- Tour by Kerry Ellis
- Promotional image for Ellis' 2011 tour
- Associated album: Anthems
- Start date: 1 May 2011
- End date: 16 July 2011
- No. of shows: 16

Kerry Ellis concert chronology
- Anthems: The Tour (2011); The Born Free Tour (2012–13)

Anthems: The Tour was the debut headlining concert tour by English stage actress and singer Kerry Ellis with Queen guitarist Brian May. The tour, comprising 16 dates in Great Britain, supported her debut album Anthems. Beginning with two charity performances, titled Anthems: The Concert, on 1 May 2011 at the Royal Albert Hall, the tour followed commenced on 3 May 2011 and ended on 16 July 2011 with a special titled Anthems in the Park at RAF Cranwell. Receiving positive reviews, the tour was complimented by critics for the pairing of May's sound and Ellis' vocals.

== Background ==
In support her debut studio album, Ellis had stated, in early 2010, in an interview with Broadway.com that she planned "to have a tour to promote" Anthems. In November of that year, she announced on Twitter that the plans for a tour are to go ahead with details to follow. By December, the Royal Albert Hall date was announced while in January 2011, due to demand, a further Royal Albert Hall date was added.

By February, twelve dates were confirmed. A further date was confirmed as part of Anthems in the Park at RAF Cranwell. In April, another was added at London's Hampton Court Palace Festival.

== Synopsis ==
=== Anthems: The Concert ===
Commencing the tour at the Royal Albert Hall on 1 May 2011 for two special charity performances (benefiting Leukaemia & Lymphoma Research), Ellis (accompanied by May) was supported by the City of London Philharmonic, The West End Chorus, American performer Adam Pascal and electronic string quartet Escala. Singer-songwriter Dan Gillespie Sells (from British pop band The Feeling) joined her for a performance of "Love It When You Call".

At the start, Ellis was hidden from the audience among a group of cloak-clad dancers. She eventually emerged in a silver showgirl outfit from the group and began singing "Dangerland".

=== Anthems: The Tour ===
Ellis performed at venues in Liverpool, Gateshead, Sheffield, Nottingham, Birmingham, Edinburgh, Glasgow, Cardiff, Manchester, Milton Keynes, Southend and Bath in the month of May. Described as "more raw" by Brian May, the tour saw Ellis accompanied by Brian May and their band (named "Anthems Ensemble").

== Critical response ==
The Royal Albert Hall concerts were met with much positivity in critical response. Edward Seckerson of The Independent wrote that the concert "makes [him] wonder if Kerry Ellis' renewed rock-chick status might permanently lure her away from the West End stage." Her "super-octane" and "powerhouse" talent was commended and he admitted that "the cosmic wall of May's now inimitable sound and style chimes with Ellis' searing vocals." He also wrote about his highlight, "Defying Gravity", confessing that the number is now more associated with Ellis than with Idina Menzel, the song's original performer. Andrew Clarke of East Anglian Daily Times commended Ellis' voice and breath control, writing that her voice "exploded on the concert stage" and "the power of [it] had the entire auditorium whooping with delight". In summary, Clake stated that it was "a highly ambitious and brilliantly realised show" that was "delivered with consummate skill and polish" with a crowd that "roared its approval" and Ellis "quite taken aback with the enthusiastic response."

On subject of the rest of the tour, David Burrows of Shropshire Star responded extremely positively and confessed that Ellis "had the room in the palm of her hand." Burrows named "Diamonds are Forever" as a stand-out performance and added that "the chemistry between Ellis and May is clear to see. These are two friends having the time of their lives." He also commented that while the crowd "might have come for Brian", "they stayed for Kerry – treating her to a number of richly deserved standing ovations." Andy Prothero of South Wales Argus also wrote that the pair "succeeded in blurring the boundaries between rock and theatre" although "it [was] tough to distinguish the Kerry fans from the Brian May fans". Eileen Wells of Express & Star responded in a similar way, writing that "an artistic chemistry between Ellis's stupendous voice and May's distinctive soaring guitar sound" create a "triumph" of a collaboration adding that "Ellis quickly dispelled any doubts about her ability to step into Freddie Mercury's shoes." Jonathan Geddes of The Herald responded less enthusiastically, admitting that "the set often had a karaoke feel to it", criticising it for being "significantly overdone". Geddes, however, enjoyed the acoustic segments and stated that May, Ellis' "propensity for costume changes" and the power of her voice "couldn't be faulted", naming the latter "outstanding". Ray Philp of Edinburgh Evening News also commended Ellis' talent yet wrote that "she [didn't] always fit in to proceedings".

Ellis' performance won the 2012 Whatsonstage.com Award for best Solo Performance.

== Supporting acts ==
- Adam Pascal (Royal Albert Hall dates only)
- Escala (Royal Albert Hall dates only)
- Vintage Trouble (All except Royal Albert Hall, Hampton Court Palace Festival and RAF Cranwell dates)

== Setlist ==
Anthems: The Concert

1 May 2011

ACT ONE
The City of London Philharmonic

- Fanfare

The West End Chorus

- The Show Must Go On

Brian May

- Speech

Hair – The West End Chorus

- The Hair Medley

Adam Pascal

1. Flying Home (from Songs for a New World)
2. Whispering / The Song of Purple Summer (from Spring Awakening)
3. You'll Never Walk Alone (from Carousel)
4. One Song Glory (from Rent)
5. Seasons of Love (from Rent)

Escala

1. Sarabande
2. Live and Let Die
3. Feeling Good

Cathy Gilman, Chief Executive of Leukaemia and Lymphoma Research

- Speech

The West End Chorus

- Love Changes Everything (from Aspects of Love)

ACT TWO
Kerry Ellis and Brian May

1. Dangerland
2. I'm Not that Girl
3. I Can't Be Your Friend
4. Diamonds are Forever
5. Somebody to Love
6. Last Horizon (Brian May solo)
7. Love of My Life
8. I Loved a Butterfly
9. Save Me
10. No-One but You (Only the Good Die Young) (Kerry Ellis solo)
11. You Have to Be There
12. Love It When You Call
13. We Will Rock You
14. We Are the Champions

ENCORE
Kerry Ellis and Brian May

1. Anthem
2. Defying Gravity
Anthems: The Tour

3 May 2011 – 16 July 2011

1. Dangerland
2. I'm Not that Girl
3. I Can't Be Your Friend
4. Diamonds are Forever
5. Somebody to Love
6. Crazy Little Thing Called Love (from 12 May onwards)
7. Last Horizon / Brighton Rock (Brian May solo)
8. Love of My Life
9. I Loved a Butterfly
10. Save Me
11. No-One but You (Only the Good Die Young) (Kerry Ellis solo)
12. You Have to Be There (all dates except Gateshead and Sheffield)
13. Love It When You Call
14. Defying Gravity (was the second number in the encore in Liverpool)
15. We Will Rock You
16. We Are the Champions

ENCORE

1. Anthem
2. Gimme Some Lovin' (from 12 May onwards)
3. Tie Your Mother Down

== Tour dates ==
Date	City	Country	Venue
1 May 2011	London	England	Royal Albert Hall ^{[A]}
3 May 2011	Liverpool	England	Liverpool Philharmonic Hall
5 May 2011	Gateshead	England	The Sage Gateshead
6 May 2011	Sheffield	England	Sheffield City Hall
8 May 2011	Nottingham	England	Nottingham Royal Concert Hall
9 May 2011	Birmingham	England	Birmingham Symphony Hall
11 May 2011	Edinburgh	Scotland	Edinburgh Festival Theatre
12 May 2011	Glasgow	Scotland	Glasgow Royal Concert Hall
14 May 2011	Cardiff	Wales	St David's Hall
16 May 2011	Manchester	England	Bridgewater Hall
18 May 2011	Milton Keynes	England	Milton Keynes Theatre
19 May 2011	Southend	England	Cliffs Pavilion
21 May 2011	Bath	England	The Forum
11 June 2011	London	England	Hampton Court Palace Festival
16 July 2011	Cranwell	England	RAF Cranwell

Notes:

- A Ellis performed a matinée show (at 16:00) and an evening show (at 20:00) on this date.

== Personnel ==
- Kerry Ellis: Vocals
- Brian May: Guitar; Backing Vocals

=== The Band ===
- Stuart Morley: Keyboards
- Jeff Leach: Keyboards
- Jamie Humphries: Guitar
- Neil Fairclough: Bass
- Rufus Taylor: Drums
- Kirstie Roberts: Backing Vocals
- Niamh McNally: Backing Vocals
