= Kerry Ellis =

English actress and singer (born 1979)

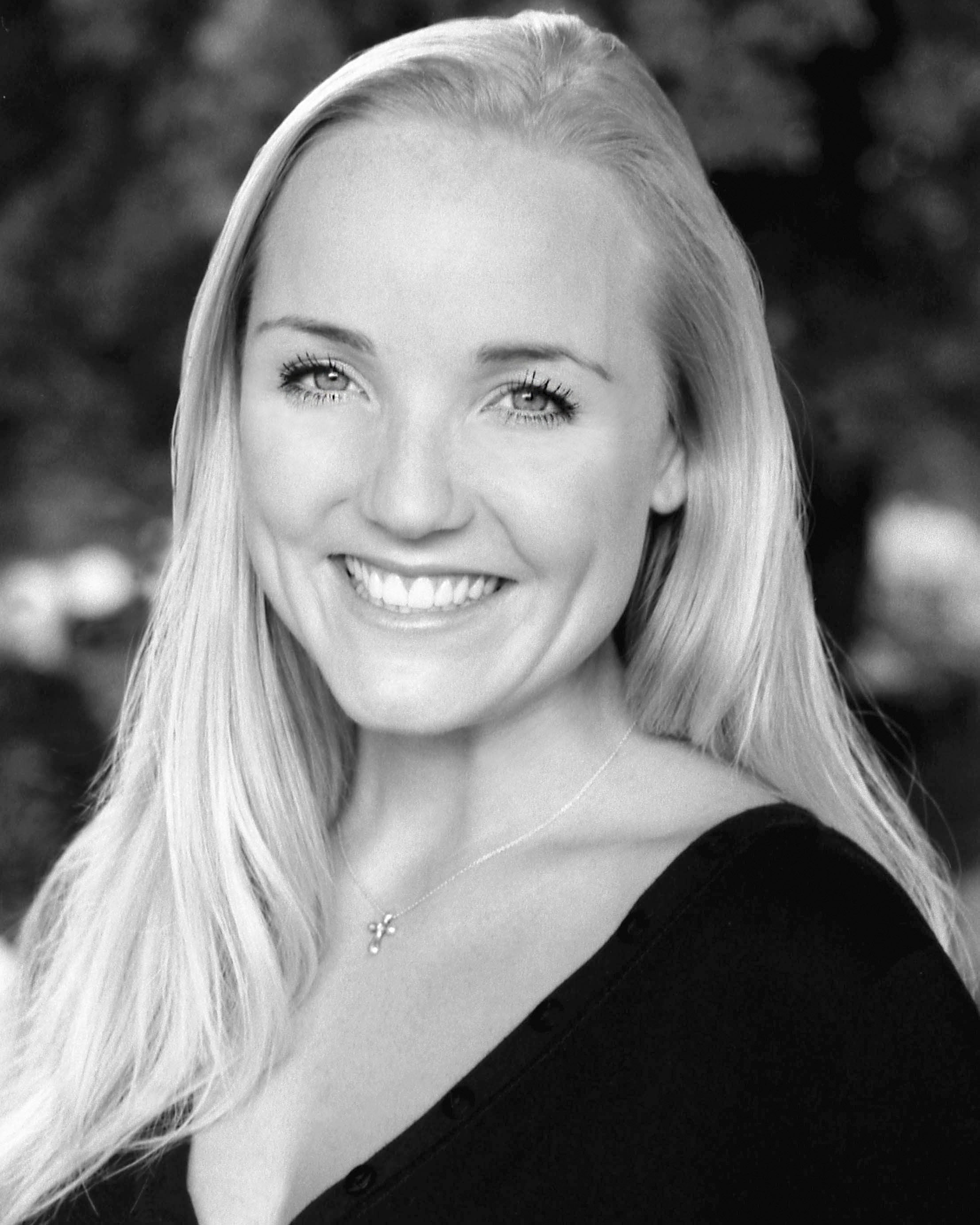
- Ellis in 2012
- Born: Kerry Jane Ellis; 6 May 1979 (age 47); Haughley, Suffolk, England
- Education: Laine Theatre Arts
- Occupations: Actress, singer
- Years active: 1998–present
- Spouse: James Townsend (m. 2011)
- Children: 2
- Website: KerryEllis.com

Kerry Jane Ellis (born 6 May 1979) is an English actress and singer who is best known for her work in musical theatre and her subsequent crossover into music. Born and raised in Suffolk, Ellis began performing at an early age before training at Laine Theatre Arts from the age of 16.

Ellis made her first professional stage appearance in 1998 and went on to make her West End debut in the 2001 revival of My Fair Lady as an understudy for the role of Eliza Doolittle. In 2002, she landed the role of Meat in the original London cast of We Will Rock You and has subsequently played lead roles in musicals Les Misérables, Wicked (in the West End and on Broadway), Oliver! and Cats as well as appearing in national tours and concert productions of musicals like Miss Saigon, Chess, The War of the Worlds, RENT, and Anything Goes. Ellis, who has received several awards and nominations for her performances, has become recognised as the First Lady of West End musicals. She has also worked sporadically in film and television.

After meeting Queen guitarist Brian May in 2002, Ellis expanded her repertoire as a solo artist. She has released four studio albums Anthems (2010), which reached number 15 on the UK Albums Chart, the self-titled Kerry Ellis (2014), Golden Days (2017) and Feels Like Home (2020) as well as an extended play Wicked in Rock (2008) and a live album Acoustic by Candlelight (2013). Ellis also appears as a featured artist on several other albums. Ellis has performed in concerts across the world in addition to headlining solo concert tours like Anthems: The Tour and The Born Free Tour.

In addition to her musical work, Ellis involves herself in charity work for the Born Free Foundation with May and is the patron of several arts organisations. In 2019, Ellis received an honorary fellowship from the University of Suffolk.

== Early life and training ==
Kerry Jane Ellis was born on 6 May 1979 in Haughley, near Stowmarket, in Suffolk, the daughter of Sandra Ann Reed and Terry John Ellis. Describing herself as a hyperactive young girl, she attended dance classes at the Ann Holland School of Theatre Dance and performed in local shows and pantomimes whilst also enjoying swimming and horse-riding. Her first stage role was in The Wizard of Oz at the Wolsey Theatre in nearby Ipswich where she played a Munchkin at the age of 9. After a successful audition, she also spent the summer of 1990 with the National Youth Music Theatre (NYMT).

When her parents took her to see the West End production of Les Misérables for her thirteenth birthday, "that's when I knew I wanted to be on the stage." Although she had not discovered her vocal ability until she was at college and had started working, Ellis cites her early influences as Liza Minnelli, Elaine Paige and Barbra Streisand; their music she would sing in her bedroom much to the disturbance of her older brother Andrew, now a keen fisherman. She has explained that fellow musical theatre actress Ruthie Henshall inspired her growing up: "[Henshall] was a success story from Suffolk … I think I identified with her because it was an actual story that I saw happen and was achievable. She was only a couple of years ahead of me and I could relate to her."

Whilst attending Stowmarket High School, she completed work experience with Starmakers, a company of holiday entertainers, at Potters Leisure Resort in Hopton-on-Sea. She also spent the summers of 1995 and 1997 with the company to earn money by singing many of their cabaret shows. Having left school at 16, Ellis turned to Laine Theatre Arts, an independent performing arts college, where she spent three years to gain a national diploma in musical theatre. "It was an incredible three years where I learnt a great deal about myself, the industry and came away feeling part of something special," she remembers. Ellis was also in the same year as fellow musical theatre actress Louise Dearman. By the time she graduated in 1998, Ellis had appeared in a number of professional pantomimes for E&B productions including Dick Whittington (1995) and Aladdin (1996) across theatres in the UK as well as performing the title role in Cinderella (1997) at the Cliffs Pavilion in Southend-on-Sea.

== Career ==
=== Career beginnings and My Fair Lady (1998–2002) ===
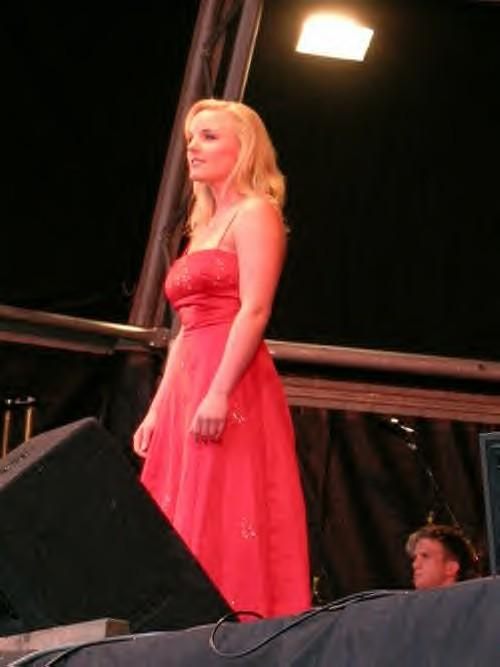
Ellis performing in a musical adaption of Jesus Christ Superstar, 2004.

Following her graduation, Ellis became first understudy to Marti Webb in a UK concert tour of The Magic of the Musicals in 1998, required on several occasions in Webb's absence, yet took a hiatus in 1999 to board cruise ship MS Voyager of the Seas, employed as lead vocalist in the ship's entertainment staff. After nine months travelling across The Caribbean, she left the ship in Los Angeles, spent three months travelling across the US until her visa ran out, and then returned to understudy in the UK concert tour. By November 1999, she had made her first television appearance on Children in Need for their special Pudsey the Musical and was featured in a jingle for Capital FM. Following this, she appeared as the title role in a Gary Griffin-directed workshop production titled Helen of Troy and played the role of Mary in Merrily We Roll Along at the Yvonne Arnaud Theatre.

By late 2000, she had settled in her first property, a two-bedroom Brockley maisonette, and joined the original cast of Cameron Mackintosh's London revival of My Fair Lady, appointed swing and second of two understudies to Martine McCutcheon in the role of Eliza Doolittle after being scouted by agent Jonathan Greatorex. The musical initially played at the Lyttelton Theatre at the Royal National Theatre from 6 March 2001 to 20 June 2001 but later transferred to Theatre Royal, Drury Lane with shows beginning 21 July 2001. Due to the illnesses of both McCutcheon and first understudy Alexandra Jay during the production's run at both theatres, Ellis starred as Eliza Doolittle opposite Jonathan Pryce and Dennis Waterman; her West End debut saw her taking on the lead role with only three hours preparation.

"Kerry [had] been in rehearsals throughout the run but she didn't find out until late afternoon that she was going on. She was scared and excited but enjoyed it," said agent Greatorex with first understudy Jay adding, "She was fantastic. She probably showed me up" while Ellis concluded, "I was nervous but once I was on stage the nerves disappeared and I thoroughly enjoyed the experience." She played Eliza Doolittle on a total of five occasions and departed from the company in July 2002. "I have particularly fond memories of this, my first West End show, and the experience I gained from the cast and creatives was fantastic," she reflected. She also stated, "It was a great step up for me. It was important not just in the type of show it was but also in getting my face known."

=== We Will Rock You, Miss Saigon and Les Misérables (2002–2006) ===
During her run in My Fair Lady, Queen guitarist Brian May and music director Mike Dixon came to see the production. The first time, they saw Ellis perform in the ensemble; they returned for a second time at a performance where she was understudying the role of Eliza Doolittle and anonymously encouraged her to audition for the debut of their jukebox musical We Will Rock You. Ellis admitted at the time she had no idea it was May who was watching her; she found out at a later date. After seven auditions, she landed the role of Meat and got to sing the solo song "No-One but You (Only the Good Die Young)".

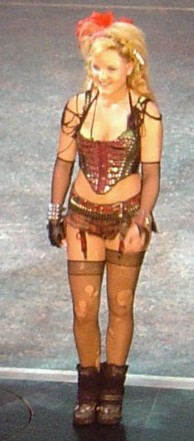
Ellis in We Will Rock You, 2002.

She began performances on 14 May 2002 and was also involved in television appearances with the cast on Parkinson and at Party at the Palace. Ellis, who ended her run as Meat on 17 April 2004, is also featured on the original London cast recording of We Will Rock You. She stated that working with May, Elton and Roger Taylor was "a great step forward" in her professional career; calling her journey "breath-taking."

Particularly interested in working with her musically, May partnered with Ellis during her time in We Will Rock You to lay the foundations of her musical career. "From the moment I first heard Kerry sing, I was entranced, and felt the conviction that I would one day make an album for her. That conviction never left me," he professed. In 2002, they recorded an orchestral version of the song "No-One but You (Only the Good Die Young)". It was digitally released three years later. Whilst still in the production, Ellis also performed in one-off intimate gigs at London venues.

After leaving the show, she performed in a concert version of Jesus Christ Superstar as the female lead, Mary Magdalene, at Porchester Castle in June 2004 alongside other West End performers and the Bournemouth Symphony Orchestra. She also played Eva Cassidy in a 2004 workshop production of Way Beyond Blue, a Trevor Nunn-directed and Imogen Stubbs-written piece, in addition to being cast as Ellen in a UK tour of Miss Saigon. She went into rehearsals for Miss Saigon at Sadler's Wells Theatre in Islington before performances commenced on 14 June 2004 at the Theatre Royal in Plymouth. A BBC critic opined, "Although not on stage much, the brief moments with [Ellis'] Ellen are emotional and compassionate as well as vocally beautiful."

Following this, Ellis got the role of Fantine in the West End production of Les Misérables. Ellis started rehearsals while still touring with Miss Saigon, and rehearsed for four weeks with the company before beginning the role of Fantine on 27 June 2005 at the Queen's Theatre alongside John Owen-Jones, Shonagh Daly, Shaun Escoffery and Hayden Tee. Ellis played Fantine for almost a year and ended her time with the company on 24 June 2006. Theatre producer Cameron Mackintosh professed that Ellis made an "outstanding" Fantine in addition to admitting his pleasure at seeing Ellis' career grow through roles in three of his productions and naming her a "great talent."

=== Wicked, Broadway, Chess and other performances (2006–2009) ===
In July 2006, Ellis joined the original London cast of the musical Wicked at the Apollo Victoria Theatre to play Elphaba. Ellis had been contracted to serve as a temporary standby to Idina Menzel, the original Elphaba, for three months from first performances in September 2006, before taking over to play the lead role full time in January 2007. During Menzel's run, Ellis played Elphaba on nine occasions in Menzel's absence; some fans turned up at the theatre expressly hoping to witness Ellis. Ellis also made numerous appearances at concerts and events, singing songs from the musical, including West End Live in Leicester Square, Walk for Life in Hyde Park, Kids Week in Covent Garden, and the annual Gay Pride Festival in Trafalgar Square, in addition to making an appearance on lunchtime television chat show Loose Women. She continued the role at the Apollo Victoria Theatre until 7 June 2008. For her portrayal, Ellis won the Whatsonstage.com Theatregoers' Choice Award for Best Takeover in a Role in and a nomination for Favourite Theatre Actress at the Lastminute.com People's Choice Theatre Awards.

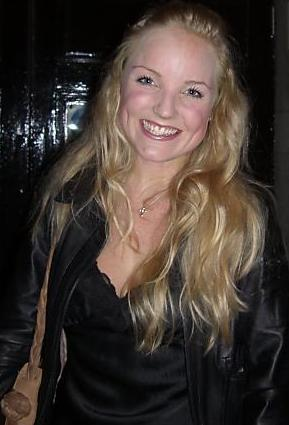
Ellis outside the stage door of Apollo Victoria Theatre in 2008.

Following her time in Wicked in London, Ellis then transferred to the Broadway production of the show at the Gershwin Theatre with performances starting on 17 June 2008. She replaced stage actress Stephanie J. Block, making her the first Wicked actress to transfer from the West End to Broadway. Playing alongside Kendra Kassebaum as Glinda and Aaron Tveit as Fiyero for her five-month run, Ellis won the Broadway.com Audience Award for Favourite Female Breakthrough Performance in 2009. Ellis also got involved in the musical's 5th anniversary celebrations by switching on the lights of the Empire State Building with composer and lyricist Stephen Schwartz. Ellis also performed at Broadway on Broadway in Times Square, recorded a song titled "Behind these Walls" for Scott Alan's album Keys and released her first extended play Wicked in Rock (2008) during her time in New York. Produced by Brian May and Steve Sidwell, the EP comprises three tracks: new orchestrations of "Defying Gravity" and "I'm Not that Girl" from Wicked and Queen song "No-One but You (Only the Good Die Young)" that she and May recorded six years earlier. Ellis left the Broadway company on 9 November 2008 and was replaced by Marcie Dodd. She refers to the transfer from West End to Broadway theatre as "a real honour [and] a joy"; adding that performing on Broadway was "a dream come true."

Ellis returned to the West End production of Wicked on 1 December 2008 and spent a further five months as Elphaba where, ultimately, she ended her time with the musical. She played her last performance as Elphaba on 9 May 2009 and was succeeded by Alexia Khadime two days later. Upon departure, Ellis had been billed as lead for a total of 116 weeks (omitting absence) in both the London and Broadway companies, making her the longest-serving British actress in the role of Elphaba (until Rachel Tucker later succeeded this feat in June 2012). Furthermore, Ellis and Dianne Pilkington (who played as Glinda alongside her) were the show's longest serving leads. In 2013, she was named the favourite West End Elphaba in a Whatsonstage.com poll asking the public to vote for their favourite actress who had played the role in London.

Ellis cited the role of Elphaba as the "most challenging [that she had] ever undertaken" stating that it was "a massive journey" to go on at every performance and admits that Wicked "changed [her] life" in terms of boosting her recognition within the entertainment industry. Ellis also represented the musical at the annual Royal Variety Performance in 2008 where she performed her rock version of the Wicked song "Defying Gravity" alongside Brian May on guitar at the London Palladium.

Whilst still involved in Wicked, Ellis also performed alongside Idina Menzel, Adam Pascal, Josh Groban, Clarke Peters, Marti Pellow and David Bedella in a two-day limited engagement of Chess in Concert at the Royal Albert Hall on 12 and 13 May 2008. She played the role of Svetlana and upon reflection, stated that to star at the Royal Albert Hall, work with an "amazing" company and sing alongside those particular cast members "was a dream come true." This concert version was later released on DVD and CD and screened on US network television.

Following her departure from Wicked, she recorded material with Brian May for her debut album and performed at various live events including her first set of solo musical showcase concerts entitled Kerry Ellis Sings the Great British Songbook at the Shaw Theatre on Euston Road in London. She performed on four dates in late June 2009 with the inclusion of Brian May in each night's encore. Of the concerts, Ellis commented, "It's finally something that I can do as me, as opposed to being in a show as a character. It's lovely to be able to sing songs that I really want to sing or which I wouldn't normally get to sing." The showcase paid tribute to some of Ellis' favourite British composers and lyricists including Take That, Duffy, Andrew Lloyd Webber and Paul McCartney. Of her "eclectic set" with "velvety rich distinctive vocals," a critic professed, "Ellis is as sexy as any other female pop star out there today and she sings like a true diva," and concluded, "She may have left Oz for good but there is no place like home and for Kerry Ellis that home is most definitely the stage."

Ellis also performed on tours celebrating the music of Queen in 2009, including the Symphonic Queen Spectacular across cities in the UK and Champions of Rock across cities in Sweden. She also performed with John Barrowman at the 2009 Henley Festival (which was later broadcast on BBC Radio 2's Friday Night is Music Night), at the 2009 Edinburgh Fringe Festival and at Thank You for the Music – a special concert in Hyde Park celebrating the music of Benny Andersson and Björn Ulvaeus (of ABBA) in September 2009 – where she delivered the first UK performance of "You Have to Be There", a song from the pair's musical Kristina från Duvemåla. Ellis also performed alongside other musicians at the Royal Albert Hall in November at Women of Rock, a performance dedicated to breast cancer research, and also appeared as a featured artist on a version of "Somebody to Love" on Only Men Aloud!'s second studio album Band of Brothers (2009); she later performed this song live with the choir at one of their concerts in December 2009 at Theatre Royal, Drury Lane.

=== Oliver!, Anthems, tour and other ventures (2010–2011) ===
Her return to the stage for the first time almost a year, Ellis replaced Jodie Prenger in the role of Nancy in Cameron Mackintosh's London revival of Oliver! at Theatre Royal, Drury Lane. Ironically, Ellis had appeared in the BBC talent show I'd Do Anything (2009), mentoring potential Nancys (including Jodie Prenger) in the fore-running to the opening of this London revival. She also mentored potential candidates in Over the Rainbow (2010), BBC's subsequent talent show that searched for a Dorothy Gale for the 2011 musical adaptation of The Wizard of Oz. Ellis first played Nancy on 29 March 2010 to positive reviews, starring alongside Griff Rhys Jones (and later Russ Abbot) as Fagin and Steven Hartley as Bill Sikes. She was the second and final actress to play Nancy in the London revival, continuing the role until the end of the show's run on 8 January 2011. Ellis was nominated for the 2010 BroadwayWorld.com UK Award for Best Leading Actress in a Musical and the 2011 Whatsonstage.com Theatregoers' Choice Award for Best Takeover in a Role but lost to Sheridan Smith as Elle Woods in Legally Blonde and Rachel Tucker as Elphaba in Wicked, respectively.

Fabricated within the space of nine months, Anthems, Ellis' debut studio album, was released in mid September 2010. The album, which was produced by Brian May and recorded at Abbey Road Studios with a 70-piece orchestra, was described by Ellis as one that "tap[s] into all the different areas that [she has] been part of" in her career between the years 2000 and 2010. It includes both original songs, songs from musicals and concerts in which she has been involved as well as new arrangements of personal favourites. May stated that "[Kerry and I]'ve created [...] a style that defines a new form of music – a kind of anthemic-orchestral-rock-musical-theatre fusion," while Ellis remarked, "I think [Anthems has] got a touch of camp to it, really. It's very grand. [It has] big orchestras and big ballad-y vocals." The album peaked at number 15 on the UK Albums Chart.

Promotion of the album included Ellis performing (with Brian May) on many television shows like Tonight's the Night, The Michael Ball Show, This Morning and The Alan Titchmarsh Show, as well as performing live at the BBC Radio Theatre and later, London nightclub, G-A-Y. The weekend prior to the album's release, Ellis was accompanied by May on guitar at BBC's Proms in the Park where she performed songs from Anthems as well as a medley of Queen songs. Joined by May once again, Ellis performed at The Royal British Legion's Festival of Remembrance at the Royal Albert Hall in the presence of the British royal family – including Queen Elizabeth II.

In support of Anthems, Ellis and May embarked on her first headlining concert tour of Great Britain, titled Anthems: The Tour. The tour commenced at the Royal Albert Hall on 1 May 2011 for two special charity performances (benefiting Leukaemia & Lymphoma Research), titled Anthems: The Concert, where Ellis was supported by the City of London Philharmonic, The West End Chorus, performer Adam Pascal and electronic string quartet Escala. Her performances at the Royal Albert Hall both sold out and later garnered her the 2012 Whatsonstage.com Theatregoers' Choice Award for Best Solo Performance and a nomination for the 2011 BroadwayWorld.com UK Award for Theatrical Event of the Year (she lost to 25th anniversary celebrations of The Phantom of the Opera). After attending Anthems: The Concert, critic Mark Shenton of The Stage hailed Ellis, a "small but fierce and fiery performer," as "this generation's Elaine Paige, with a similarly soaring, scorching voice." He also made reference to her cult following built from her Wicked days, labelling her "our local green goddess of song." Despite professing he prefers other contemporary musical theatre actresses, "I can't deny the power and following she clearly has." Anthems: The Tour continued at venues throughout Great Britain and finished at RAF Cranwell in July 2011 where the pair headlined a special titled Anthems in the Park. The tour was met with mostly positive reviews with critics praising the meshing of May's sound with Ellis' voice.

Previous to this, she performed in various concerts throughout 2010 including The Night of 1000 Voices – which was dedicated to the 80th birthday of composer and lyricist Stephen Sondheim – at the Royal Albert Hall in May, A Weekend with the Stars where she performed "Somebody to Love" with Only Men Aloud! at the Wales Millennium Centre, and at an event celebrating the 80th anniversary of the birth of composer Lionel Bart at the Hackney Empire where she sang the Oliver! song "As Long as He Needs Me". The last two performances were later broadcast in December on British television channel S4C and on BBC Radio 2 respectively. She also lent her voice to a version of the song "Wind Beneath My Wings" that features the Central Band of the Royal Air Force on their album Reach for the Skies and appears on a version of the song "Come What May" with Alfie Boe on his album Bring Him Home. Among other participants from the London theatre community, Ellis additionally lent her voice to "inspirational" videos that were released upon to video-sharing website YouTube for the "It Gets Better" campaign – a project created by columnist Dan Savage in response to school bullying and a rash of suicides among young LGBT people aiming to "provide hope to youth struggling with their identity." With John Partridge, Ellis also presented the Laurence Olivier Award for Best Actress in a Musical at the 2010 Laurence Olivier Awards.

She also continued to perform in various concerts throughout 2011, including her return to the leisure resort where she first started working, Potters Leisure Resort, to perform in the One Night Musicals Spectacular, which saw Ellis in combination with "musical variety from Potters Theatre Company and other leading West End singers" in February. In March, she duetted with performer Barry Manilow on the Finian's Rainbow song "Look to the Rainbow" at the 2011 Laurence Olivier Awards in addition to returning to London nightclub G-A-Y, performing "Love It When You Call", "I Know Him So Well", "Diamonds are Forever" and the remixed version of her rock version of the song "Defying Gravity".

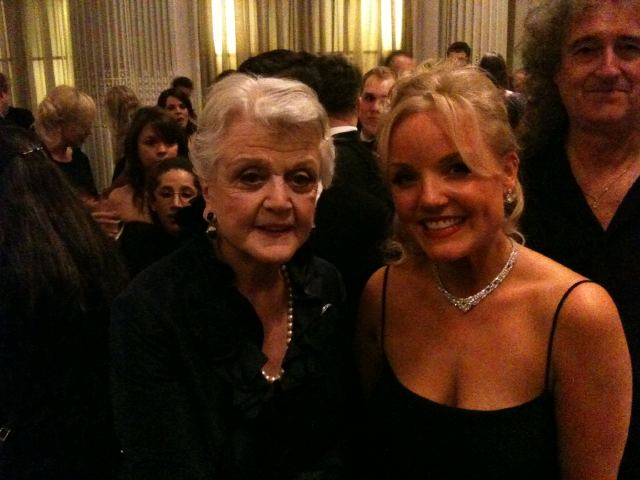
Angela Lansbury, Ellis (centre) and Brian May at the 2011 Laurence Olivier Awards

April saw Ellis became a patron – alongside Bonnie Langford – to Guildford's Performance Preparation Academy (PPA). The school now offers annual scholarships in both Ellis' and Langford's names. In May, she judged in the 2011 Stephen Sondheim Society Student Performer of the Year competition in addition to performing "Cabaret" and "Rock-a-Bye Your Baby with a Dixie Melody" at the Mermaid Theatre as part of the BBC Radio 2 special Friday Night is Music Night in a special concert celebrating the music of the BBC's radio programme Desert Island Discs and appearing at gay nightclub Cruz 101 to perform "Love It When You Call", "Somebody to Love" and the remixed version of her rock version of the song "Defying Gravity" in celebration of the club's 19th birthday.

With Brian May, she accepted an invitation to fly a training sortie with the Red Arrows on 16 June: Ellis on Red 1 with Squadron Leader Ben Murphy (the leader of the Red Arrows) while May flew on Red 7 with Flight Lieutenant Ben Plank. The same month, the pair performed "Born Free" at the 2011 Born Free Foundation Gala Dinner at the Savoy Hotel to celebrate the 80th birthday of its founder Virginia McKenna and teamed up again to perform at the 2011 Goodwood Festival of Speed in July.

In August, she kicked off the 20th English Premier League for the FA Community Shield by performing the British national anthem at Wembley Stadium and also became a patron to Emil Dale's School of Performing Arts in Hitchin while September saw her performing at the opening launch concert of the new Diamond Theatre in Slovenia and returning to London's Savoy to sing at the 65th birthday celebrations of Freddie Mercury. She also returned to the Shaw Theatre in London on 30 September and 1 October, accompanied by musician Craig Adams, to perform in a pair of solo concerts titled An Audience with Kerry Ellis in addition to appearing at the 40th anniversary celebratory concert of the Broadway musical Godspell at the Palace Theatre, Manchester in late October. Aside her professional endeavours, Ellis married her long-term boyfriend James Townsend on 8 September 2011 following their engagement in November 2010.

=== The Voice UK, The War of the Worlds and RENT (2012–2013) ===
In January 2012, Ellis auditioned for the debut series of The Voice UK, a reality television singing competition. The show saw Ellis giving a blind audition in front of its four coaches. She sang "Son of a Preacher Man" but it failed to progress her further after none of the coaches turned round to select her to be in their groups. Her audition aired on BBC One in March; the panel reacted with positive feedback. Tom Jones consoled her: "You seem like you've already made it," referring to her theatrical career, while Danny O'Donoghue stated, "I thought you did a really phenomenal job, I really did. I can't fault that, all I can fault is myself for not turning around. I am looking for a specific type of girl singer and you're not it but you will be for 99% of the UK I am sure." Her name later trended on social networking site Twitter.

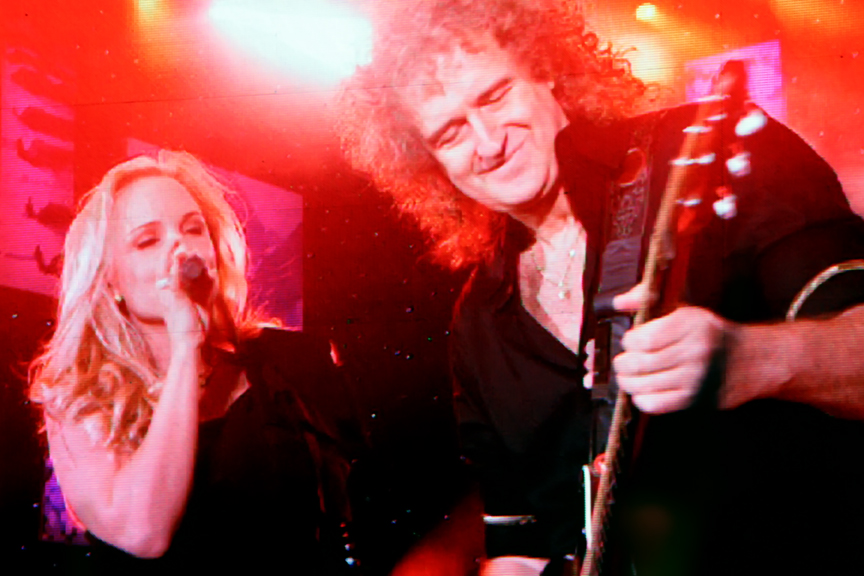
Ellis performing with Brian May in 2010.

She has continued to perform, appearing at a charity concert of Children of Eden alongside other West End performers at London's Prince of Wales Theatre in January which provoked Mark Shenton to label Ellis and Louise Dearman as "the twin goddesses of West End musical voices." Ellis paired with Brian May and singer Irene Fornaciari at the 2012 Sanremo Music Festival on the songs "I (Who Have Nothing)" and "We Will Rock You" in February. The same month, she closed the 2012 Whatsonstage.com Theatregoers' Choice Awards with May and also performed with him at the launch of Pride of Cape Town in South Africa in March. There, she also shot a documentary to highlight her charity work with the Born Free Foundation. After becoming patron of the Wattisham Military Wives Choir, she went solo in the one-off concerts Coming Home and on the Edge towards the end of March and start of April and also led her own BBC Radio 2 Friday Night is Music Night special with guests Brian May, Ramin Karimloo and Jonathan Ansell.

Other appearances saw her sit on the celebrity judging panel for West End Eurovision 2012 and perform in Scott Alan's concert at New York's Birdland in April in addition to returning to The Night of 1000 Voices at the Royal Albert Hall, judging contestants for the Craig Barbour Award at the Soho Theatre, and playing at a Marco Bicego London jewellery exhibition in May. The same month, she flew to Florence in Italy to perform with Italian Queen tribute band Killer Queen, but returned to England to sing with Brian May at concert titled Rock Against Cancer in Devizes. In June, Mark Shenton listed Ellis on his article about his "favourite leading musical ladies" in West End theatre, complimenting her for bringing "a different kind of pop passion to her voice that has stood her in good stead for [West End] shows." June also saw her being filmed at Pinewood Studios for the film adaptation of the musical Les Misérables (2012), where she plays an uncredited wench in the "Master of the House" number which features Sacha Baron Cohen and Helena Bonham Carter. She has also paired with Craig Adams on his new musical Defect; she recorded a demo with Oliver Tompsett entitled "If Only You Could Know" for the musical in June.

Throughout July, Ellis appeared in an interview-and-song series, These Are A Few of My Favourite Songs, at London's Soho Theatre, performed with the winners at the live final of #searchforatwitterstar – an online Twitter talent competition, sang as a special guest at musical concert West End Men with Lee Mead in both Jersey, Guildford and Guernsey, and sat on the judging panel for the gala finale of Talent 2012 at the Garrick Theatre – a competition on the search for the next West End musical theatre star. In August, Ellis was made the official patron of St. George's Youth Theatre in Great Yarmouth, the Vice President of the Newmarket Operatic Musical and Dramatic Society (later their patron) and the first official patron of West End Stage, a London-based theatrical summer school, in addition to chatting with David Bedella at the After Show with David Bedella at the Alleycat in London's Soho.

In September, she performed with Brian May at both the Freddie for a Day launch event at London's Savoy Hotel, Wildlife Rocks at the Guildford Cathedral and at The Sunflower Jam at London's Royal Albert Hall in addition to sitting on the judging panel at London dog show Pup Aid. The following October, she led a week of solo concerts at the Hippodrome Casino in Leicester Square with a small band and a number of special guests in addition to singing at an event entitled A Night at the Musicals at the Wales Millennium Centre, part of the 2012 Cardiff Music Festival. The same month, she flew to Shanghai to participate in a string of concerts entitled Ultimate Broadway at the city's Culture Square Theatre. These concerts featured other performers from the West End and celebrate both classical and contemporary Broadway hits. Ellis also embarked on her second headlining concert tour with Brian May, The Born Free Tour, performing dates in and around the home counties from 5 to 19 November. The same month, the pair performed at the Make-A-Wish Foundation Winter Ball at The Dorchester in London. In December, they also paired up again to perform for a Christmas special of Weekend Wogan, which was broadcast later in the month on BBC Radio 2. She was also named an official patron of the Academy for Theatre Arts in Newcastle-under-Lyme in the same month. In January 2013, she was also made an official patron of the British Dance Arts Federation (BDAF).

Ellis returned to her theatrical roots on the New Generation tour of The War of the Worlds, performing the role of Beth, at arenas around Europe from November 2012 to January 2013. The sold-out performance at The O2 Arena was recorded and was released in cinemas in April and will be on DVD in November. Ellis also performed the role of Mimi alongside Superstar finalist Rory Taylor in the 20th anniversary concert production of the musical RENT that toured the UK, opening on 25 April 2013 at The Opera House in Manchester before playing theatres in London, Liverpool, Newcastle, Cardiff, Birmingham, Stoke-on-Trent, Glasgow and Leeds. It finished at The Cliffs Pavilion in Southend-on-Sea on 5 May 2013. She also appeared on select dates in the musical concert The West End Men led by Lee Mead at London's Vaudeville Theatre from 25 May to 22 June.

Other performances in 2013 include her leading a week of cabaret shows at The Pheasantry in London in February and at Tiger Tracks, a three-week tiger conservation event, performing a free outdoor charity gig at St Pancras railway station with Brian May in March. In April, she returned to the After Show with David Bedella at the Alleycat in London's Soho to chat with David Bedella. In May, she led her own solo concert, entitled Kerry Ellis in Concert, at the London Palladium for one night only with various special guests including Brian May and West End performers, in addition to performing at the Guildford School of Acting choir's concert with Ruthie Henshall, returning to West End Eurovision to present the West End Wilma Volunteer of the Year award and also headlining the 9th annual Spotlight Ball. In June, she performed in front of Catherine, Duchess of Cambridge at the naming ceremony of the newest addition of the P&O Princess Cruises' fleet, Royal Princess, before going back on the road to do a second leg of The Born Free Tour in the UK and Ireland with Brian May.

The pair then took The Born Free Tour to mainland Europe in July in addition to performing at the 47th Montreux Jazz Festival in Switzerland followed by a performance at the 2013 Guitare en scène festival 2013 in the east of France. In August, she performs in West End Anthems, a musical theatre revue, at the Glow venue in Bluewater in Kent and will be a special guest at An Intimate Evening with Ruthie Henshall at London's Cadogan Hall and a special guest at The Velma Celli Show at the Hippodrome Casino, London. Ellis returned to the Hippodrome Casino in September, as a special guest at Christina Bianco's Diva Moments concert. The same month, she also performed with Michael Ball and Gina Beck in Summertime, a musical theatre event celebrating the music of George Gershwin, at London's Kenwood House, in addition to talking to Edward Seckerson in his Singular Sensations series at Charing Cross Theatre, London, and playing an acoustic set with Brian May at the Hope 4 Apes charity ball, hosted by Sir David Attenborough, at The Savoy, London. She also appeared in TransAtlantic, a concert mix of new musical theatre at St James Theatre, London, singing a duet with Rory Taylor in September. In October, she performed at Inspiration Awards for Women at Cadogan Hall, London. Ellis will also perform at A Night at the Musicals when it returns to the Wales Millennium Centre as well as appearing as a special guest in a Christmas Spectacular at the Royal Albert Hall in December.

Throughout these endeavours, Ellis worked on new music with Brian May; she released a live album Acoustic by Candlelight with him on 17 June 2013. Prior to its release, the pair released a cover of "Born Free" as a single on 5 November 2012 and a new song "The Kissing Me Song" on limited edition 7" vinyl for Record Store Day on 20 April 2013 and as a single on 17 June 2013. A DVD of the tour will also be available by Christmas 2013. She also provided vocals for "The Badger Swagger", a song with Brian May and Slash in support of Team Badger, a coalition of organisations teaming up to fight the planned cull of badgers in the UK, which was released on 3 June 2013, and also for a charity single with Viva! (Vegetarians International Voice for Animals), which will be released in time for Christmas 2013. Ellis gave birth to a baby boy, Alfie Ellis-Townsend, on 25 October 2013.

=== Concerts, new album, return to Wicked, Cats (2014–present) ===
In the first quarter of 2014, Ellis performed in West End Anthems at the Watford Colosseum and also returned to 20th anniversary concert tour of RENT for dates across the UK in January and February. She also went back on the road with Brian May on The Candlelight Concerts tour between February and March as well as returning to London's Pheasantry, performing in A Night in the West End with the London Philharmonic Orchestra at the Royal Concert Hall, Nottingham, singing in a solo concert Live at the Gaiety Theatre on the Isle of Man, and performing at An Evening of Movies and Musicals with Joe McElderry in Scotland.

Ellis also launched a Pledge page, with a variety of VIP packages and Ellis gifts to try to fund her new album. Her new album, Kerry Ellis was released on 14 September 2014.

On 12 July 2014, Ellis joined Wicked's original Broadway Glinda, Kristin Chenoweth in a duet of "For Good" during her one night only solo concert at the Royal Albert Hall.

On 14 July 2014, it was announced that Ellis would once again rejoin the West End production of Wicked, replacing Willemijn Verkaik as Elphaba at the Apollo Victoria Theatre. She played a limited 12-week engagement from 4 August 2014 through 25 October 2014.

In December 2014, Ellis released a double album, together with fellow musical theatre stars, Louise Dearman and Ben Forster, of Alexander S. Bermange's three-person musical, The Route to Happiness. This was made available as a deluxe 2-CD set and to download.

In February 2015, Ellis took over from Nicole Scherzinger as Grizabella in Cats at the London Palladium.

On Sunday 27 September, she performed in the previously announced one-night-only concert with fellow West End Star and friend Louise Dearman at the Prince Edward Theatre. She gave birth to her second child, a boy called Freddie, on 30 November 2015.

In 2017, Ellis starred as Alice in the UK tour of Wonderland.

In August 2018, Ellis played at the Glamis Proms at Glamis Castle, the childhood home to Her Majesty, Elizabeth The Queen Mother.

On 18 December 2019, Ellis performed "Rise Like a Phoenix" in the opening of the Miss World 2019 pageant.

Ellis sang "Defying Gravity" as the finale of Musicals: The Greatest Show, a socially distanced show with no audience, performed at the London Palladium, broadcast on BBC1 on 7 February 2021.

In February 2022, it was announced that Ellis would play Reno Sweeney in the UK/Ireland tour of Anything Goes, which also played at London's Barbican Theatre for the summer of 2022, until September 3.

In July 2024, it was announced that Ellis would portray Cruella de Vil in the UK and Ireland tour of 101 Dalmatians. Ellis appeared during the tour’s runs at the New Theatre Oxford and Theatre Royal, Brighton. She was the final star cast member announced for the penultimate and concluding performances of the tour, scheduled from 3 December 2024 to 5 January 2025. From 31 January to 1 February, 2025, Ellis performed a concert at 54 Below in New York City.

== Work and credits ==
=== Theatre ===
Title	Year(s)	Role(s)	Venue(s)
My Fair Lady	2001–2002	Swing; Eliza Doolittle (second understudy)	Lyttelton Theatre at the National Theatre, London; Theatre Royal, Drury Lane, London
We Will Rock You	2002–2004	Meat	Dominion Theatre, London
Miss Saigon	2004–2005	Ellen	UK tour
Les Misérables	2005–2006	Fantine	Queen's Theatre, London
Wicked	2006–2008	Elphaba	Apollo Victoria Theatre, London
Wicked	2008	Elphaba	Gershwin Theatre, New York
Wicked	2008-2009	Elphaba	Apollo Victoria Theatre, London
Oliver!	2010–2011	Nancy	Theatre Royal, Drury Lane, London
Wicked	2014	Elphaba	Apollo Victoria Theatre, London
Cats	2015	Grizabella	London Palladium, London
Murder Ballad	2016	Sara	Arts Theatre, London
Wonderland	2017	Alice	UK tour
Anything Goes	2022	Reno Sweeney	UK tour Barbican Theatre, London
101 Dalmatians	2024-2025	Cruella de Vil	UK tour New Theatre Oxford, Oxford; Theatre Royal, Brighton, Brighton

Workshops

Title	Year	Role
Helen of Troy	2000	Helen of Troy
Way Beyond Blue	2004	Eva Cassidy

=== Concerts ===
Musical concerts

Title	Year	Role	Venue
Jesus Christ Superstar	2004	Mary Magdalene	Portchester Castle, Portchester
Chess	2008	Svetlana Sergievsky	Royal Albert Hall, London
Godspell	2011	Female vocal leads	Palace Theatre, Manchester
Children of Eden	2012	Special guest	Prince of Wales Theatre, London
The War of the Worlds – The New Generation	2012–2013	Beth	Various arenas across Europe
RENT	2013–2014	Mimi	Various theatres across the UK
The West End Men	2013	Herself	Vaudeville Theatre, London
West End Women	2014	Herself	UK & Ireland Tour

Solo concerts

Title	Year	Venue(s)
Kerry Ellis Sings the Great British Songbook	2009	Shaw Theatre, London
Anthems: The Concert	2011	Royal Albert Hall, London
Anthems: The Tour	2011	Various across the UK
An Audience with Kerry Ellis	2011	Shaw Theatre, London
Coming Home	2012	The Apex, Bury St Edmunds
On the Edge	2012	Gwyn Hall, Neath
Live at the Hippodrome	2012	Hippodrome Casino, London
The Born Free Tour	2012–2013	Various across the UK, Ireland and Europe
An Evening with Kerry Ellis	2013	The Pheasantry, London
Kerry Ellis Live	2013	New Wolsey Theatre, Ipswich
Kerry Ellis in Concert	2013	The Palladium, London
The Candlelight Concerts	2014	Various across the UK and Europe
Kerry Ellis in Concert UK Tour	2014	Various across the UK
One Voice The Tour	2016	Various across Europe

=== Film ===
Title	Year	Role
Les Misérables	2012	Wench (extra)
Wicked: For Good	2025	TBA (cameo)

=== Television ===
Title	Year	Channel	Role	Notes
Parkinson	2002	BBC One	Herself	Performed "We Will Rock You" and "We Are the Champions" with Brian May, Roger Taylor and We Will Rock You cast
Party at the Palace	2002	BBC One	Meat	Performed "We Will Rock You" and "Bohemian Rhapsody" with Brian May, Roger Taylor and We Will Rock You cast
Loose Women	2007	ITV	Elphaba	Performed "The Wizard and I"
I'd Do Anything	2008	BBC One	Herself	Mentored potential Nancys at the Apollo Victoria Theatre
Royal Variety Performance	2008	BBC One	Herself	Performed "Defying Gravity" with Brian May
Over the Rainbow	2010	BBC One	Herself	Mentored potential Dorothys at the Dominion Theatre
Big Brother's Little Brother	2010	E4	Herself	Interview
Tonight's the Night	2010	BBC One	Herself	Performed "Wind Beneath My Wings" with contestant and "Anthem" with Brian May
The Michael Ball Show	2010	ITV	Herself	Interview; performed "Anthem" with Brian May
This Morning	2010	ITV	Herself	Interview; performed "Anthem" with Brian May
Breakfast	2010	BBC One	Herself	Interview
BBC London News	2010	BBC One	Herself	Interview with Brian May
Proms in the Park	2010	BBC Red Button	Herself	Performed "Dangerland", "I'm Not that Girl", "Anthem", "We Will Rock You" and "We Are the Champions" with Brian May
The Wright Stuff	2010	Channel 5	Herself	Special guest panelist
Festival of Remembrance	2010	BBC One	Herself	Performed "Anthem" with Brian May
Only Men Aloud – Merry Christmas	2010	S4C	Herself	Performed "Somebody to Love" with Only Men Aloud
Breakfast	2011	BBC One	Herself	Interview with Brian May
2011 Laurence Olivier Awards	2011	BBC Red Button	Herself	Performed "Look to the Rainbow" with Barry Manilow
The Alan Titchmarsh Show	2011	ITV	Herself	Performed "Defying Gravity"
Fern	2011	Channel 4	Herself	Interview; performed "I Love a Butterfly" with Brian May
The Hour	2011	STV	Herself	Interview; performed "I Love a Butterfly" with Brian May
FA Community Shield	2011	Sky Sports	Herself	Performed the British national anthem at Wembley Stadium
Sanremo Music Festival 2012	2012	Rai 1	Herself	Performed "I (Who Have Nothing)" and "We Will Rock You" with Brian May and Irene Fornaciari
The Voice UK	2012	BBC One	Herself	Auditioned for the show's first series
Foxes Live: Wild in the City	2012	Channel 4	Herself	Appeared in a short film about saving foxes with Brian May
Live with…	2012	Channel 5	Herself	Interview with Jeff Wayne
The Wright Stuff	2012	Channel 5	Herself	Special guest panelist
ITV News London	2013	ITV	Herself	Interview about Tiger Tracks and animal conservation with Brian May
The Late Late Show	2013	RTÉ One	Herself	Interview; performed "Life is Real" with Brian May
This Morning	2013	ITV	Herself	Interview; performed "Born Free" with Brian May
The Alan Titchmarsh Show	2013	ITV	Herself	Interview; performed "The Kissing Me Song" with Brian May
Sunday Brunch	2013	Channel 4	Herself	Interview with Brian May
Big Brother's Bit on the Side	2013	Channel 5	Herself	Surprise guest panelist
Pointless Celebrities	2013	BBC One	Herself	West End special
Diamonds Are Forever: The Don Black Songbook	2014	BBC Four	Herself	Performed with Brian May
'Musicals: The Greatest Show	2021	BBC One	Herself	Performed with BBC Concert Orchestra at the London Palladium

=== Discography ===
Solo recordings

Title	Year	Chart positions
Title	Year	UK
Wicked in Rock	2008	—
Anthems	2010	15
Acoustic by Candlelight (with Brian May)	2013	—
Kerry Ellis	2014	50
Golden Days (with Brian May)	2017	27
Feels Like Home	2020	—
Kings & Queens	2023	—

Cast recordings

Title	Year	Notes
My Fair Lady	2001	Featured as part of the ensemble on the 2001 London cast recording
We Will Rock You	2003	Featured as Meat on "I Want It All", "Headlong", "No-One But You (Only the Good Die Young)" and "Crazy Little Thing Called Love" and as ensemble on several songs on the original London cast recording
Wicked	2008	Featured on "I'm Not that Girl" on the bonus disc of the 5th anniversary edition of the original Broadway cast recording
Chess in Concert	2009	Featured on "Someone Else's Story", "The Deal (No Deal)", "I Know Him So Well" and "Endgame (Part 3)"
The Route To Happiness	2014	With Louise Dearman and Ben Forster

Other recordings

Title	Year	Notes
Keys: The Music of Scott Alan	2008	Featured on "Behind these Walls" with Scott Alan
Champions of Rock	2009	Featured on several songs
Band of Brothers	2009	Featured on "Somebody to Love" with Only Men Aloud!
Reach for the Skies	2010	Featured on "Wind Beneath My Wings" with RAF Central Band
Bring Him Home	2010	Featured on "Come What May" with Alfie Boe
Music of the Night: The Ultimate Musicals Collection	2011	Featured on "Come What May" with Alfie Boe and "Defying Gravity"
Scott Alan: LIVE	2012	Featured on "Never Neverland (Fly Away)" with Scott Alan
I'll Stand by You	2013	Featured on "Come What May" with Alfie Boe and "Defying Gravity"
Badger Swagger	2013	Featured on "Badger Swagger" with David Attenborough, Brian May, Slash and Shara Nelson

== Awards and nominations ==
Throughout her career, Ellis has accrued a total of five wins from thirteen nominations in various audience choice awards for her theatrical and musical work.

Year	Nominated work	Award	Result
2007	Elphaba in Wicked	Lastminute.com People's Choice Theatre Award for Favourite Theatre Actress	Nominated
2008	Elphaba in Wicked	Whatsonstage.com Theatregoers' Choice Award for Best Takeover in a Role	Won
2009	Elphaba in Wicked	Broadway.com Audience Award for Favorite Female Breakthrough Performance	Won
2010	Nancy in Oliver!	BroadwayWorld.com UK Award for Best Leading Actress in a Musical	Nominated
2011	Nancy in Oliver!	Whatsonstage.com Theatregoers' Choice Award for Best Takeover in a Role	Nominated
2011	Anthems: The Concert	BroadwayWorld.com UK Award for Theatrical Event of the Year	Nominated
2012	Anthems: The Concert	Whatsonstage.com Theatregoers' Choice Award for Best Solo Performance	Won
2013	Kerry Ellis at the Palladium	BroadwayWorld.com UK Award for Theatrical Event of the Year	Nominated
2015	Elphaba in Wicked	Whats on Stage Award for Best Takeover in a Role	Won
2015	Kerry Ellis at The Phesantry	London Cabaret Award for Best One-off Production	Nominated
2015	"Memory" from Cats	West End Frame Award for Best Performance of a Song	Nominated
2015	Grizabella in Cats	BroadwayWorld.com UK Award for Best Featured Actress in a New Production of a Musical	Won
2015	Kerry Ellis & Louise Dearman Live in Concert	BroadwayWorld.com UK Award for Theatrical Event of the Year	Nominated
