= Shaw Theatre =

Theatre in Somers Town, London, England

The Shaw Theatre

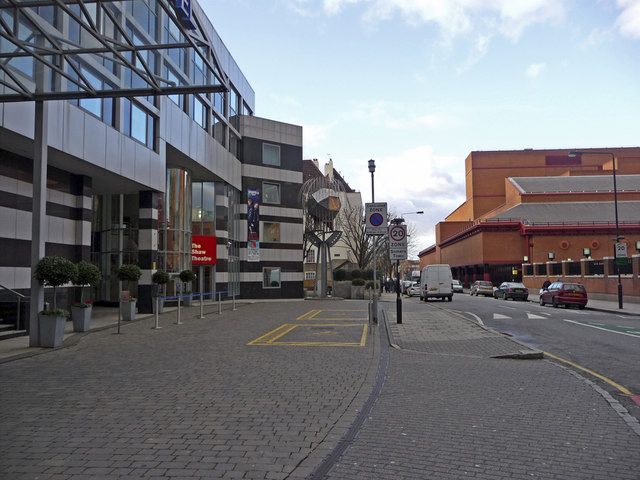
- Looking down Ossulston Street: the Shaw Theatre is on the left
- Interactive map of The Shaw Theatre
- Address: 100 Euston Road; London, NW1; England
- Coordinates: 51.5287°N 0.128°W
- Capacity: 446
- Public transit: King's Cross St Pancras; King's Cross; St Pancras

Construction
- Opened: 1971
- Rebuilt: 1998

Website
- shaw-theatre.com

The Shaw Theatre is a theatre in Somers Town, in the London Borough of Camden. It is a part of the Pullman London St Pancras hotel, located off Euston Road. The Shaw has 446 seats and two large foyers, four large dressing rooms for up to 60 people and extensive high-quality backstage facilities which include a workshop studio and laundry facilities. There is disabled access, cloakroom facilities and a bar serving drinks and refreshments. The venue is also used for exhibitions.

== History of the theatre ==
The Shaw Theatre originally opened its doors in 1971 as 'The Library Theatre', a purpose-built theatre within the St Pancras library. The opening production was the show Zigger Zagger with a cast that included Barrie Rutter and Paula Wilcox. In 1972, Simon Ward and Sinéad Cusack appeared in Romeo and Juliet. Later that year Vanessa Redgrave, Nyree Dawn Porter and Windsor Davies starred in Twelfth Night. Other stars who appeared in the theatre's early days included Ian McKellen, Mia Farrow, Julia McKenzie and Raymond Francis. The theatre hosted a series of 'Sunday nights at the Shaw', with many notable actors including Judi Dench, Dame Flora Robson, Patricia Routledge and Michael Williams. It also hosted numerous productions by the National Youth Theatre.

Notable musicians, actors and comedians who have performed at the Shaw Theatre include Dionne Warwick, Kerry Ellis, Eartha Kitt, Boy George, Van Morrison, Harry Connick Jr., Ron Moody and Janie Dee; Dee's concert included a surprise performance by Sir Andrew Lloyd Webber. The successful An Evening With ... nights' guests included Tony Benn, Ann Widdecombe, Sir John Mortimer and Nicholas Parsons; the latter also recorded his radio show Just a Minute at the Shaw.

In 1985, the theatre played host to stars from the rock and pop world rehearsing for the Live Aid concert. Notably, Queen rehearsed their legendary Live Aid set at the Shaw.

After undergoing refurbishment in 1998, it was reopened by artistic director Mike Redwood in 2001 with an inaugural season including Chekhov, Gogol and the pantomime Snow White. The Shaw Theatre's policy was to present, as a receiving house, high-quality drama from funded regional theatre and independent theatre companies for short- to medium-length runs and short-term hires. The theatre was also in demand from New York City–based Broadway and off-Broadway producers.

The theatre is now part of the four-star Pullman London St Pancras hotel operated by the large French hotel chain AccorHotels. It was renamed in honour of George Bernard Shaw, who lived locally in his later life.

As of 2023, the theatre operated as a hire-only venue, open to both artistic and conference hires.

== Fire ==
On 9 March 2018, a fire broke out on stage at the Shaw Theatre. Six fire crews attended with 35 firefighters, and the blaze was brought under control after one hour and fifty minutes. The theatre was repaired, redecorated, and reopened in late 2018.
