= Steve Sidwell (musician) =

English arranger, composer and trumpeter

Steve Sidwell is an English arranger, composer, and trumpeter.

== Music career ==
Some of his work include the composition of "Elements & Motion" for the 79th Academy Awards with the Hollywood SFX Chorale, which received an Emmy nomination. Other credits include London 2012 Summer Olympics closing ceremony, The Nightly Show 2017 with hosts Bradley Walsh and Jason Manford, the 2015 Rugby World Cup Opening Ceremony at Twickenham, 2015 and 2014 BBC Music Awards, BBC Live at Edinburgh Castle, 2014 Ryder Cup Gala, Robbie Williams Live at The Palladium, Bruce Forsyth's Hall of Fame, BBC The Voice series 1 and 2, Robbie Williams Live at the Albert, The Robbie Williams TV Special, Children in Need Rocks the Royal Albert Hall, Children in Need Rock the MEN, Children in Need Rocks for Terry, the BBC Olympic Handover Concert, Victoria Wood’s Christmas Special, Victoria's Empire, Chris Moyles' Quiz Night, Ant & Dec's Christmas Show and the opening of The Dubai World Cup.

Sidwell's 2018 projects include: conductor and orchestrator for The Queen's Birthday Party; music co-producer for the film Bohemian Rhapsody.

Advertising campaigns include the award-winning Honda Civic Choir (conducted by Sidwell himself), Stella 4%, M&S Christmas featuring Shirley Bassey, Virgin Holidays featuring Charlotte Church, Nokia Navigator, Heineken, Orange, Bounty, Dulux, Lotto, Walkers, McDonald's, Supernoodles, Coca-Cola, Capital Radio London and Guinness.

Theatre credits include orchestrating Beautiful: The Carole King Musical for which Sidwell was nominated for a Tony Award for Best Orchestrations. Sidwell's 2015 Grammy Award was for the Best Musical Theatre Album for the original cast album Beautiful: The Musical. In 2017 Sidwell orchestrated Jim Steinman's Bat Out Of Hell. He also orchestrated We Will Rock You, Made In Dagenham, Our House, Daddy Cool, Viva La Diva, Dancing On Ice Live and Katherine Jenkins' Believe show.

Sidwell has also contributed to film including tracks for Baz Luhrmann's Moulin Rouge! and Romeo + Juliet, Bridget Jones's Diary, SpongeBob SquarePants, Finding Nemo, Mona Lisa Smile, and 101 Dalmatians 2.

Album credits include the orchestration and conducting of Robbie Williams' multi-platinum selling albums Swings Both Ways and Swing When You're Winning. Recent projects include recordings with Sarah Brightman and the LSO, Paul Young, Jeff Beck, Seal, Shirley Bassey, Kerry Ellis and Paul Carrack.

Sidwell has also performed professionally with many international artists including Enya, George Michael, Amy Winehouse, Snow Patrol, Lily Allen, Cheryl Cole, Muse, Dizzee Rascal, Mika, Nik Kershaw, Take That, Annie Lennox, Leona Lewis, Tom Jones, Sting, Elton John, Paul McCartney, Mick Jagger, Mark Knopfler, The Feeling, McFly, Will Young, Bryan Ferry, Joss Stone, Eric Clapton, Rod Stewart, Stevie Wonder, The Who, Ian Dury, Wet Wet Wet, Charlie Watts, Henry Mancini, Michael Nyman, Todd Rundgren, The Metropole Orchestra and Joan Armatrading.

Sidwell also conducted the score for Disney's Once Upon a Dream Parade, the daily parade at Disneyland Paris which was the centrepiece of the resort's 15 year anniversary in 2007. The music was performed by the 100-strong Royal Philharmonic Orchestra in London, and is a "little bit jazzy" in its style.

Sidwell has worked with Kerry Ellis and Brian May on Ellis' first EP Wicked in Rock and debut album Anthems.

He was musical director for BBC's The Voice UK Series 1 and 2 with Tom Jones, Jessie J, Danny O'Donoghue and will.i.am.

Sidwell was the arranger of Robbie Williams album Swings Both Ways. The album features duets with Lily Allen, Michael Bublé, Kelly Clarkson, Olly Murs and Rufus Wainwright.

Steve Sidwell has also worked with Fairuz. He arranged her album Bebalee, released in September 2017. The album was recorded at Angel Studios in London in 2016, where Sidwell conducted the orchestra.

== Awards ==
Sidwell is the orchestrator and arranger for the Broadway and West End musical Beautiful: The Carole King Musical. He was awarded the Grammy Award for Best Musical Theater Album for the soundtrack. He was also nominated for a Tony Award in 2014 and an Olivier Award in 2015.

== Collaborations ==
Year	Album	Artist	Notes
1985	Secret Secrets	Joan Armatrading	
1986	Running in the Family	Level 42	
1987	Save the Last Dance for Me	Ben E. King	
1987	Faith	George Michael	on the track "I Want Your Sex Part II: Brass in Love"; co-played horns with Paul Spong, Rick Taylor
1988	Stop!	Sam Brown	on the track "Nutbush City Limits"
1988	Comedy	Black	
1991	Black	Black	
1992	Amused to Death	Roger Waters	on "Late Home Tonight, Part I" and "... Part II"
1993	Je te dis vous	Patricia Kaas	
1993	The Red Shoes	Kate Bush	
1996	Elena	Maggie Reilly	
1996	Older	George Michael	
1997	Across from Midnight	Joe Cocker	
1997	Life thru a Lens	Robbie Williams	
1999	Twenty Four Seven	Tina Turner	
1999	The Accused	Black	
1999	No Ordinary World	Joe Cocker	
1999	Twelve Months, Eleven Days	Gary Barlow	
2000	Fabulous	Sheena Easton	
2000	Play Mode	Randy Crawford	
2000	Sing When You're Winning	Robbie Williams	
2000	Both Sides Now	Joni Mitchell	
2001	Goddess in the Doorway	Mick Jagger	
2001	Swing When You're Winning	Robbie Williams	
2002	Escapology	Robbie Williams	
2003	Seal	Seal	
2005	Intensive Care	Robbie Williams	
2005	The Moment	Lisa Stansfield	
2006	Back to Black	Amy Winehouse	
2007	Kill to Get Crimson	Mark Knopfler	
2013	New	Paul McCartney	
2015	7	Seal	
