= Kerry Ellis (album) =

Studio album by Kerry Ellis
- Released: 14 September 2014
- Genre: Musical theatre

Kerry Ellis chronology
Acoustic by Candlelight (2013)	Kerry Ellis (2014)	Golden Days (with Brian May) (2017)

Kerry Ellis is a self-titled studio album by actress and singer Kerry Ellis which was released on 14 September 2014. It featured "songs from my recent stage show at the London Palladium including standards, musical favourites, the odd Queen song and some new compositions"

== Track listing ==
Standard edition
No.	Title	Length
1.	"Let It Go" (from the film Frozen)	4:01
2.	"I Could Have Danced All Night" (from the musical My Fair Lady)	3:38
3.	"Take That Look Off Your Face" (from the musical Tell Me On a Sunday)	4:08
4.	"As Long as He Needs Me" (from the musical Oliver!)	2:56
5.	"Who Will Buy" (from the musical Oliver!)	3:10
6.	"On the Street Where You Live" (from the musical My Fair Lady)	4:53
7.	"I Dreamed a Dream" (from the musical Les Misérables)	3:26
8.	"The Way We Were" (from the film of the same name)	3:00
9.	"Give Me Love"	5:47
10.	"Alfie"	2:43
11.	"(I've Had) The Time of My Life (feat Joe McElderry)"	4:34
12.	"Take That Look Off Your Face" (G-A-Y Remix)	3:44
