= Wicked in Rock =

EP by Kerry Ellis
- Released: 7 July 2008
- Recorded: 2002–2008; Allerton Hill, England
- Genre: Anthemic, orchestral, musical theatre, rock, heavy metal
- Length: 13:08
- Producer: Brian May, Steve Sidwell

Kerry Ellis chronology
Wicked in Rock (2008)	Anthems (2010)

Singles from Wicked in Rock
- 1. "No-One but You" Released: 19 March 2005

Wicked in Rock is an EP by actress and singer Kerry Ellis. It was arranged, produced and accompanied on guitar by Brian May and features Taylor Hawkins on drums. A 60+ piece orchestra, conducted by Steve Sidwell, was also used. The album had a physical release on 7 July 2008 as a CD and as a 12" vinyl. The EP was also released for digital download. The three tracks on this EP are included on her debut studio album Anthems (2010).

== Track listing ==
No.	Title	Writer(s)	Length
1.	"Defying Gravity"	Stephen Schwartz	4:02
2.	"I'm Not that Girl"	Schwartz	3:47
3.	"No-One but You"	Brian May	5:19

== Credits and personnel ==
- Kerry Ellis - lead vocals, backing vocals
- Brian May - arrangement, bass, guitars, keys, production, programming
- Steve Sidwell - orchestral arranger, conductor
- Taylor Hawkins - drums (for "Defying Gravity" and "I'm Not that Girl")
- Chris Chaney - bass (for "I'm Not that Girl")
- Roger Taylor - drums (sticks) (for "No-One but You")
- Keith Prior - drums (brushes) (for "No-One but You")
- Justin Shirley-Smith - co-producer, engineer
- Kris Fredriksson - co-producer, engineer
- Kevin Metcalf - master
- Isobel Grrifiths - orchestra contractor
- The London Philharmonic Orchestra - orchestra
- Perry Montague-Mason - orchestra leader (for "Defying Gravity" and "I'm Not that Girl")
- Gavyn Wright - leader (for "No-One but You")
- Steve Price - orchestra recording engineer
- Matt Bartram - orchestra Pro Tools (for "Defying Gravity" and "I'm Not that Girl")
- Tom Jenkins - orchestra Pro Tools (for "No-One but You")
- Jake Jackson - assistant (for "No-One but You")
- Joshua J. Macrae - additional Pro Tools (for "No-One but You")

== Release history ==
Region	Date	Format	Label
United Kingdom	7 July 2008	CD, digital download, 12" vinyl	Duck Productions
