= Anthems (Kerry Ellis album) =

Studio album by Kerry Ellis
- Released: 13 September 2010
- Recorded: 2002–10; Allerton Hill, England
- Genre: Pop rock
- Length: 44:41
- Labels: Decca, Universal
- Producer: Brian May

Kerry Ellis chronology
Wicked in Rock (2008)	Anthems (2010)	Acoustic by Candlelight (2013)

Singles from Anthems
- 1. "I'm Not that Girl" / "Dangerland" Released: 6 September 2010; 2. "Anthem" Released: 12 December 2010

Anthems is the debut studio album by actress and singer Kerry Ellis which was released on 13 September 2010 by Decca Records. Produced by rock musician Brian May, the album comprises eleven tracks that tap into all the different areas that Ellis had been part of in her professional career between the years 2000 and 2010. Photography for the album's artwork was completed by Paul Rider with design and art direction by Tourist.

The album peaked at number fifteen on the UK Albums Chart and remained on the chart for two weeks. It also produced two singles, "I'm Not that Girl" (with a B-side of "Dangerland") and "Anthem", but both failed to chart on the UK singles chart. Despite its limited success on the UK chart, it was received positively by critics and spawned Anthems: The Tour which paired Ellis and May on a tour around Great Britain in the summer of 2011.

== Background and development ==
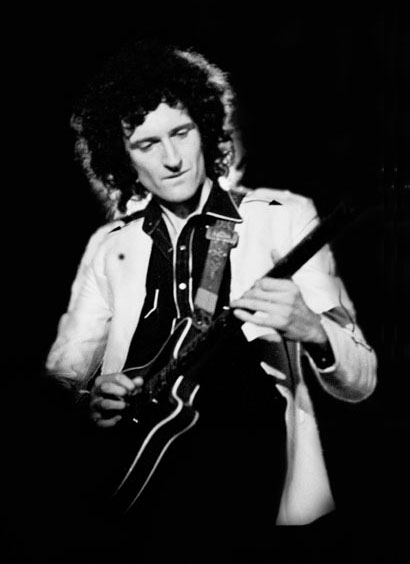
Rock musician Brian May worked extensively with Kerry Ellis on Anthems

Rock musician Brian May "talent-spotted" Ellis when she understudied Martine McCutcheon in the musical My Fair Lady. May stated, "From the moment I first heard Kerry sing, I was entranced, and felt the conviction that I would one day make her album. The conviction never left me. The hard thing was to find the right medium to harness that amazing voice – the material and arrangements had to be worthy, and a musical style evolved to capture her unique magic."

He quickly snapped her up to star in the Queen musical We Will Rock You in 2002, and it was in between rehearsals and performances that the two of them found the time to begin work on some new ideas. May stated, "it was very exciting to work with someone with such a great female voice. I was just very inspired by the sound that Kerry could make and the interpretation that she could bring. So I started in odd moments to prepare tracks so that when she had an odd moment she could come down and try them out." At first, Ellis met May with disbelief when he declared, "I'd really like to work with you and do an album," but after recording material for the cast album, their first effort was an orchestral version of Queen song "No-One but You (Only the Good Die Young)" which was digitally released in 2005 but failed to chart on the UK singles chart.

Nonetheless, their collaboration continued through the following years in which May did two world tours, and Ellis starred in more musicals including Wicked, before releasing the teaser extended play Wicked in Rock (which includes 3 of Anthems' songs) in 2008. What would later become Anthems had been in the works ever since, and after leaving Wicked in May 2009, Ellis spent much time in May's recording studios while visiting Abbey Road to record with a 70 piece orchestra, a rock band and May. He later explained that Queen once debated on calling a compilation album Anthems, adding that the title "seems to cover what we are doing very well. With this album, the anthem feel comes not directly from the songs but from the overall feel and performance."

On describing her partnering with May, Ellis professed, "It's pure joy! He's a dear friend now because we've been working together for so many years. He's taught me so much along the way and I've been a part of the entire process. A lot of performers now go in and do their vocals and leave it to the team to put it together, whereas I've been part of the whole creation and the production side of it; I've had a say in everything so I really feel that it is my album. He's let me do that, I've had the freedom to do that because of Brian."

== Composition ==
"It really took time to find out what my sound was and what kind of music I wanted to do. I really tried to combine everything and keep my theatrical background and roll it into work with my music. The album that comes out will be very dramatic. It's a big sound. We've got a big orchestra and a rock band over the top of it. It's almost filmic. It's been nice to have the grace of time and be able to discover what the album will be."

— Kerry Ellis

"Brian and I chose the songs together. It's basically my journey. We tried to incorporate songs that have been poignant to my career so it tells the story of how it all evolved," remembers Ellis. The album features new arrangements of personal favourites and some completely original material – all produced and arranged by both May and musician Steve Sidwell. "It's just mind-blowing. I don't know how to describe the sound of it. It's just epic. It's widescreen music," Ellis stated. The songs included on the album have some significance to Ellis' professional career since meeting May in 2002 until 2010.

The album opens with a distinctive Middle Eastern vibe from the Brian May-penned track "Dangerland", one of the two original songs to appear on Anthems, and then moves into the title song, a rock-tingled version of "Anthem" from the musical Chess, which was inspired by her involvement in Chess in Concert at the Royal Albert Hall in 2008. The second original song "I Can't Be Your Friend (This Can't Be Over)" is the album's third track while the subsequent Wicked tracks "Defying Gravity" and "I'm Not that Girl", possessing new rock-driven arrangements, reference her three-year stay in the musical and were also included on her first EP Wicked in Rock (2008). "Rock music has always been in me. When I was younger I always wanted to sing, perform and be in shows but I think the rocky side of me has always been there, it's just my route to it took the long way round," Ellis reminisced.

After singing next track "You Have to Be There" (a song from the musical Kristina) to surprising reception at a public event in 2009, Ellis decided it should be included on Anthems. Similarly, May encouraged that a cover of The Feeling's "Love it When You Call" be included after her fan base "erupted" when hearing Ellis sing it at her 2009 one-woman show. Eighth track "Save Me", originally a Queen song, was first recorded by Ellis to front May's Save Me campaign that called on the British public to consider how their vote would affect the welfare of animals while "Diamonds are Forever", the album's ninth track, was included after Ellis sang it at the 2009 Henley Festival; English lyricist Don Black especially adapted some of the song's lyrics for her. Following this is the original 2002 version of "No-One but You (Only the Good Die Young)" that appeared on her EP Wicked in Rock (2008) after May and Ellis recorded it during her time in the musical We Will Rock You. The album's closing track, "I Loved a Butterfly", is a stripped-down version of the Queen + Paul Rodger's original "Some Things that Glitter"; Ellis regularly calls this her favourite track for its simplicity.

== Release and promotion ==
Anthems was released as a CD on 13 September 2010 in the United Kingdom through Decca, and in the United States on 28 September 2010 through Decca's parent company, Universal. It was made available to pre-order at online retailers like Amazon and Play.com in April 2010, and later on the UK's iTunes music store in August 2010. An exclusive box set of Anthems was also released exclusively online through Ellis' official online store. The box set version of Anthems contains the full album, a 5 × 7 art print, a four-page booklet with images and a personal message from Ellis, logo badges, postcards and a bonus DVD with featurettes upon the development of Anthems.

Radio promotion consisted of an interview on BBC Radio 2's The Arts Show with Claudia Winkleman on 6 August 2010; an appearance on BBC Radio 5 Live with Richard Bacon on 17 August 2010; an interview on Gaydar Radio on 5 September 2010, which marked the debut of her version of the song "Diamonds are Forever"; and an appearance on Woman's Hour on BBC Radio 4 on 6 September 2010. Television spots included a performance on Saturday night entertainment television programme, Tonight's the Night, on BBC One on 21 August 2010; an interview with Michael Ball on his debut chat-show on 2 September 2010; an appearance on ITV1's This Morning on 7 September 2010, where on all three occasions Ellis performed the song, "Anthem", with Brian May; an interview on BBC Breakfast on BBC One on 10 September 2010; an appearance on Sky News on 13 September 2010; and an interview on The Wright Stuff on Five on 14 September 2010.

Live performances include an appearance on Weekend Wogan on BBC Radio 2 on 15 August 2010 where Ellis, joined by Brian May, performed songs "Save Me", "I'm Not that Girl" and "I Loved a Butterfly" from the album at the BBC Radio Theatre in London; a performance at BBC Proms in the Park on 11 September 2010 in London's Hyde Park, where Ellis, again accompanied by Brian May, performed songs "Dangerland", "I'm Not that Girl", "Anthem" from the album and a medley of Queen songs "We Will Rock You" / "We Are the Champions"; and an appearance at London nightclub G-A-Y, on 18 September 2010. Upon release, Ellis gave two album signings for Anthems. The first was held at HMV Oxford Circus on 13 September 2010; the second at London theatre and showbiz merchandise shop, Dress Circle, on 18 September 2010.

=== Singles ===
Ellis released two singles from the album, but both failed to chart on the UK singles chart. "I'm Not that Girl" was released as the album's lead single as a digital download on 6 September 2010, with a B-side of "Dangerland", while "Anthem" was its second single, which was released 12 December 2010.

=== Anthems: The Concert and tour ===
Charity performances, titled Anthems: The Concert, at the Royal Albert Hall supported this debut studio album. These performances (matinée and evening), in aid of the charity Leukaemia & Lymphoma Research, were performed on 1 May 2011 and saw Ellis accompanied by Brian May, American performer Adam Pascal and a host of various other musicians, orchestras and dancers.

In a 2009 interview with Broadway.com, Ellis stated that her plan was "to have a tour to promote" Anthems; she later expressed her wish to tour with Brian May on The Michael Ball Show in September 2010. In February, it was announced that Ellis would partake in a 12-date tour across the UK with Brian May from May until July 2011. She has plans to take this tour around Europe with Brian May.

== Reception ==
=== Critical reception ===
"Now her debut album Anthems from Decca is writ even larger with an intoxicating mix of show and rock anthems giving full rein to Kerry's laser belt and May's impassioned and fabulously distinctive guitar sound. The arrangements are big, the songs bigger with show-stoppers rubbing shoulders with some May/Queen classics," wrote The Independent.

=== Chart performance ===
Anthems debuted at number fifteen on the UK Albums Chart in the week ending 25 September 2010; but fell to number seventy-eight the week later. The album failed to secure a chart position the following week, thus spent a total number of two weeks on the UK Albums Chart.

Chart (2010)	Peak position
UK Albums Chart	15

== Track listing ==
Standard edition
No.	Title	Writer(s)	Length
1.	"Dangerland" (*)	Brian May	5:59
2.	"Anthem" (from the musical Chess)	Benny Andersson, Tim Rice, Björn Ulvaeus	3:15
3.	"I Can't Be Your Friend (This Can't Be Over)" (*)	Don Black, Brian May	3:55
4.	"Defying Gravity" (from the musical Wicked)	Stephen Schwartz	4:15
5.	"I'm Not that Girl" (from the musical Wicked)	Stephen Schwartz	3:47
6.	"You Have to Be There" (from the musical Kristina)	Benny Andersson, Herbert Kretzmer, Björn Ulvaeus	4:27
7.	"Love It When You Call" (originally by The Feeling)	Ciaran Jeremiah, Kevin Jeremiah, Richard Jones, Dan Gillespie Sells, Paul Stewart	3:34
8.	"Save Me" (†)	Brian May	3:58
9.	"Diamonds are Forever" (from the 1971 James Bond film of the same name)	John Barry, Don Black	3:04
10.	"No-One but You (Only the Good Die Young)" (†)	Brian May	5:18
11.	"I Loved a Butterfly" (†)	Brian May, Roger Taylor, Paul Rodgers	3:09

Box-set edition DVD
No.	Title	Length
1.	"Kerry & Brian in the studio (Part 1)"	7:47
2.	"Kerry & Brian in the studio (Part 2)"	4:09
3.	"Photoshoot – Behind the scenes"	1:18

=== Notes ===
- (*) Tracks specifically written for Anthems
- (†) Tracks originally songs by Queen or Queen + Paul Rodgers
- Tracks 4, 5 and 10 were originally featured on Ellis' extended play Wicked in Rock
- Lyrics for track 9 were specifically altered by Don Black for Ellis

== Credits and personnel ==
- Kerry Ellis – lead vocals, backing vocals
- Brian May – arrangement, backing vocals, bass, guitars, piano, keyboards, production
- Steve Sidwell – arrangement, orchestra conductor
- John Miceli – drums on tracks 1–3
- Taylor Hawkins – drums on tracks 4 & 5
- Rufus Taylor – drums on tracks 6–9
- Roger Taylor – drums (sticks) on track 10
- Keith Prior – drums (brushes) on track 10
- Chris Chaney – bass on track 5
- Justin Shirley-Smith – co-producer, engineer
- Kris Fredriksson – co-producer, engineer

== Release history ==
Region	Date	Format	Label	Edition	Catalog
United Kingdom	13 September 2010	CD, digital download	Decca	Standard, box-set	B003FST942
United States	28 September 2010	CD, digital download	Universal	Standard	B003FST942
