= No-One but You (Only the Good Die Young) =

1997 single by Queen

- Artwork for UK release

Single by Queen

from the album Queen Rocks
- A-side: "We Will Rock You" (Rick Rubin Remix)
- B-side: "Tie Your Mother Down" (Single Version); "Gimme the Prize" (Instrumental Remix for 'The Eye') (Note: The CD single features a slightly different track listing, with "We Will Rock You" (Rick Rubin) and "Tie Your Mother Down" being swapped.)
- Released: 1997; 5 January 1998 (UK)
- Recorded: October 1997
- Length: 4:13
- Label: Parlophone (UK)
- Songwriter: Brian May
- Producer: Queen

Queen singles chronology
"You Don't Fool Me" (1996)	"No-One but You (Only the Good Die Young)" (1997)	"Another One Bites the Dust (Wyclef Jean remix)" (1998)

"No-One but You (Only the Good Die Young)" is the final single recorded by the British rock band Queen. Recorded and released in 1997, six years after the death of lead singer Freddie Mercury, it is the only Queen recording to feature a three-piece lineup: guitarist Brian May (who wrote the song), drummer Roger Taylor, and bassist John Deacon. (Note: While being the only song to be recorded by the three surviving members at the time after Freddie's death, there are several Queen songs that Freddie Mercury never sang neither as a lead vocalist and/or backing vocalist when he was alive.) May and Taylor share lead vocals. The song was released on the album Queen Rocks and it was also released as a double a-side single with "Tie Your Mother Down". It was later included on the compilation album Greatest Hits III.

This song was also the last recording to feature Deacon, who subsequently retired from public life, the last original Queen song to reach the top 40 of some European countries (Note: After the release of this song, the band's following singles were mainly collaborations with other artists, notably the boy band Five and Paul Rodgers, the lead vocalist of numerous bands: Free, Bad Company, The Firm, and The Law.) and last original release from the band until 2014's Queen Forever.

== Background ==
Brian May finished writing "No One but You (Only the Good Die Young)" in early 1997, after Queen reformed for a one-off appearance with Elton John at the Théâtre National de Chaillot in Paris. It was dedicated to Mercury and all those who die too soon. In 2019 on his Instagram page May revealed that it was during his visit to Montreux in 1996 to unveil a statue in Mercury's honour that he was first inspired to write the song. It was originally written for a potential May solo project, which eventually evolved into the album Another World. He sent the demo of the song to Roger Taylor, who by his own account put it in a drawer and forgot about it. After eventually hearing it, Taylor suggested that it could be turned into a Queen song. Taylor's contribution was to change the tempo and make the lyrics less specific to Mercury.

== Music video ==
The music video was produced by DoRo and filmed at Bray Studios, Berkshire on 29 October 1997. It was shot in black and white, and featured only the three remaining members of Queen in the studio.

A second version was also made, and is a completely different edit, featuring sepia-tinted footage of Mercury through all his years with the band. This version was featured on both Queen Rocks: The Video and Greatest Hits III VHS releases, both of which were released in 1998 and 1999, respectively.

== Track listings ==
7" Single

A1. "No-One But You (Only The Good Die Young)" - 4:13

A2. "We Will Rock You" (Rick Rubin Remix) - 4:59

B1. "Tie Your Mother Down" (Single Version) - 3:44

B2. "Gimme the Prize" (Instrumental Remix for 'The Eye') - 4:01

CD Single

1. "No-One But You (Only The Good Die Young)" - 4:13

2. "Tie Your Mother Down" (Single Version) - 3:44

3. "We Will Rock You" (Rick Rubin Remix) - 4:59

4. "Gimme the Prize" (Instrumental Remix for 'The Eye') - 4:01

== Personnel ==
- Brian May - lead vocals on first and third verses, backing vocals, piano, electric guitar
- Roger Taylor - lead vocals on second verse, backing vocals, drums
- John Deacon - bass guitar

== Chart positions ==
Chart (1997–98)	Peak position
Germany (GfK)	75
Netherlands (Dutch Top 40)	26
Netherlands (Single Top 100)	33
UK Singles (Official Charts) Released with "Tie Your Mother Down"	13

== Kerry Ellis version ==
"No-One but You"

Single by Kerry Ellis

from the album Wicked in Rock
- Released: 19 March 2005
- Recorded: 2002
- Genre: Orchestral
- Length: 5:20
- Label: Duck Productions
- Songwriter: Brian May
- Producers: Brian May, Steve Sidwell, Justin Shirley-Smith

Kerry Ellis singles chronology
"No-One but You" (2005)	"I'm Not that Girl" (2010)

In 2002, Brian May worked with stage actress and singer, Kerry Ellis, to record an orchestral version of the song as it appears in the musical, We Will Rock You, where Ellis played the role of Meat. In the musical, it is sung by Meat, who after the ensemble have recalled the names of a number of musicians who died young, will culminate in saying the name "Freddie" as a tribute to Freddie Mercury. This version of the song was made only available to download on the official Queen website on 19 March 2005 and failed to chart. However, it was later included on her extended play Wicked in Rock and subsequently featured on her debut album Anthems.

In 2004, the Spanish stage actress and singer Eva María Cortés recorded the same orchestral version in Spanish to promote the Original Madrid Cast Recording of We Will Rock You.

=== Credits and personnel ===
- Kerry Ellis – vocals
- Brian May – writer, producer, arranger, piano, guitars, bass
- Roger Taylor – drums (sticks)
- Keith Prior – drums (brushes)
- Justin Shirley-Smith – co-producer, engineer, mixer
- Kris Fredriksson – Pro Tools
- Joshua J. Macrae – additional Pro Tools
- Steve Price – engineer
- Tom Jenkins – Pro Tools
- Jake Jackson – assistant

Track recorded at Sphere Studios, Olympic Studios and Allerton Hill

- Steve Sidwell – orchestra arranger and conductor
- The London Session Orchestra – orchestra
- Gavyn Wright – orchestra leader
- Isobel Griffiths – orchestra contractor

Orchestra recorded at Air Studios, Lydhurst Hall
