= Cynthia Erivo discography =

Recordings by British singer

- Erivo in 2025
- Studio albums: 2
- EPs: 1
- Soundtrack albums: 2
- Live albums: 1
- Singles: 10

British singer, songwriter, and actress Cynthia Erivo has released 2 studio albums, 2 soundtrack albums, 1 live album, 1 extended plays (EPs), and 10 singles (including 4 as a featured artist).

== Discography ==
=== Albums ===
==== Solo studio albums ====
List of solo studio albums, with selected details and chart positions
Title	Details	Peak chart positions	
Title	Details	US	US R&B/HH
Ch. 1 Vs. 1	Released: 7 September 2021; Label: Verve; Formats: CD, LP, digital download, streaming	— (Note: Ch. 1 Vs. 1 did not enter the Billboard 200, but peaked at number 77 on the Top Album Sales chart.)	—
I Forgive You	Released: 6 June 2025; Label: Verve; Formats: Digital download, streaming	165	45

==== Collaborative studio albums ====
List of collaborative studio albums, with selected details
Title	Album details
Cynthia Erivo and Oliver Tompsett Sing Scott Alan (with Oliver Tompsett and Scott Alan)	Released: 9 October 2015; Label: Self-released; Formats: CD, digital download, streaming

=== Soundtrack albums ===
List of soundtrack albums, with selected details, chart positions, sales and certifications
Title	Soundtrack album details	Peak chart positions										Sales	Certifications
Title	Soundtrack album details	UK Com.	AUS	CAN	FRA	ITA	NLD	NOR	NZ	SWI	US	Sales	Certifications
Wicked: The Soundtrack (with Wicked Movie Cast and Ariana Grande)	Released: 22 November 2024; Label: Republic, Verve; Formats: CD, LP, digital download, streaming	1	3	9	38	42	8	26	3	29	2	US: 85,000 (Note: First week sales of Wicked in the United States.)	BPI: Gold; RIAA: Platinum; RMNZ: Gold
Wicked: For Good – The Soundtrack (with Wicked Movie Cast and Ariana Grande)	Released: 21 November 2025; Label: Republic, Verve; Formats: CD, LP, digital download, streaming	1	1	9	15	28	1	55	5	18	2		BPI: Silver

=== Live albums ===
List of live albums, with selected details
Title	Live album details
Wicked: One Wonderful Night (Live) – The Soundtrack (with Ariana Grande)	Released: 7 November 2025; Label: Republic, Verve; Format: digital download, streaming

=== Extended plays ===
List of extended plays, with selected details
Title	EP details
She Is Risen, Vol. 2 (with Morgan James, Shoshana Bean, Debbie Gravitte, Bryonha Marie Parham, Ellyn Marie Marsh, Ann Harada, Tamika Lawrence, Bridget Everett, Marva Hicks, Eden Espinosa, and A Broader Way Choir)	Released: 18 September 2020; Label: Hedonist; Formats: Digital download, streaming

=== Singles ===
==== As lead artist ====
Title	Year	Peak chart positions									Certifications	Album
Title	Year	UK	AUS	CAN	IRE	NZ Hot	SWE Heat.	US	US R&B Dig.	WW	Certifications	Album
"Fly Before You Fall"	2014	—	—	—	—	—	—	—	21	—		Beyond the Lights (Original Motion Picture Soundtrack)
"God Only Knows" (with John Legend featuring yMusic)	2018	—	—	—	—	—	—	—	20	—		Non-album single
"Stand Up"	2019	—	—	— (Note: "Stand Up" did not enter the Billboard Canadian Hot 100, but peaked at number 42 on the Canadian Digital Song Sales chart.)	—	—	2	— (Note: "Stand Up" did not enter the Billboard Hot 100, but peaked at number 31 on the Digital Song Sales chart.)	—	—	RIAA: Gold	Harriet (Original Motion Picture Soundtrack)
"When You Believe" (with Shoshana Bean featuring Stephen Schwartz)	2020	—	—	—	—	—	—	—	—	—		Non-album single
"The Good"	2021	—	—	—	—	—	—	—	—	—		Ch. 1 Vs. 1
"Glowing Up"	2021	—	—	—	—	—	—	—	—	—		Ch. 1 Vs. 1
"Defying Gravity" (featuring Ariana Grande)	2024	7	31	63	12	6	—	44	—	41	BPI: Gold; RIAA: Platinum; RMNZ: Gold	Wicked: The Soundtrack
"Replay"	2025	—	—	—	—	—	—	—	—	—		I Forgive You
"Worst of Me"	2025	—	—	—	—	—	—	—	—	—		I Forgive You
"Everytime You Go Away"	2025	—	—	—	—	—	—	—	—	—		John Candy: I Like Me
"—" denotes a recording that did not chart or was not released in that territory.

==== As featured artist ====
Song	Year	Album
"Won't Let You Down" (Cynikal featuring Cynthia Erivo)	2012	Non-album singles
"I Did Something Bad (cover)" (Shoshana Bean featuring Cynthia Erivo)	2018	Non-album singles
"Together (Soundtrack from Year in Search)" (Peter CottonTale featuring Chance the Rapper, Cynthia Erivo, Chicago Children's Choir, and Matt Jones Re-Collective Orchestra)	2020	Non-album singles
"Chain of Fools" (Genius: Aretha cast featuring Cynthia Erivo)	2021	Non-album singles

=== Other charted songs ===
Title	Year	Peak chart positions								Certifications	Album
Title	Year	UK	AUS	CAN	IRE	NZ Hot	US	US Hol. Dig.	WW	Certifications	Album
"Angels We Have Heard on High" (Lea Michele featuring Cynthia Erivo)	2019	—	—	—	—	—	—	22	—		Christmas in the City
"The Wizard and I" (featuring Michelle Yeoh)	2024	—	—	—	—	—	92	—	—		Wicked: The Soundtrack
"What Is This Feeling?" (with Ariana Grande)	2024	17	58	87	28	9	62	—	83	BPI: Silver	Wicked: The Soundtrack
"Dancing Through Life" (Jonathan Bailey featuring Ariana Grande, Ethan Slater, Marissa Bode and Cynthia Erivo)	2024	— (Note: "Dancing Through Life" did not enter the UK Singles Chart, but peaked at number 86 on the UK Streaming Chart.)	—	—	—	12	86	—	—		Wicked: The Soundtrack
"I'm Not That Girl"	2024	—	—	—	—	—	94	—	—		Wicked: The Soundtrack
"One Short Day" (with Ariana Grande, Kristin Chenoweth and Idina Menzel featuring Michael McCorry Rose)	2024	—	—	—	—	—	— (Note: "One Short Day" did not enter the Billboard Hot 100, but peaked at number 14 on the Bubbling Under Hot 100 chart.)	—	—		Wicked: The Soundtrack
"For Good" (Live from the Gershwin Theatre) (with Ariana Grande, Idina Menzel and Kristin Chenoweth)	2025	—	—	—	—	37	—	—	—		Wicked: One Wonderful Night
"Every Day More Wicked" (with Wicked Movie Cast featuring Michelle Yeoh and Ariana Grande)	2025	—	—	—	—	—	— (Note: "Every Day More Wicked" did not enter the Billboard Hot 100, but peaked at number 15 on the Bubbling Under Hot 100 chart.)	—	—		Wicked: For Good – The Soundtrack
"No Place Like Home"	2025	—	—	—	—	—	— (Note: "No Place Like Home" did not enter the Billboard Hot 100, but peaked at number 12 on the Bubbling Under Hot 100 chart.)	—	—		Wicked: For Good – The Soundtrack
"Wonderful" (with Jeff Goldblum and Ariana Grande)	2025	—	—	—	—	—	— (Note: "Wonderful" did not enter the Billboard Hot 100, but peaked at number 18 on the Bubbling Under Hot 100 chart.)	—	—		Wicked: For Good – The Soundtrack
"As Long as You're Mine" (with Jonathan Bailey)	2025	29	—	—	—	10	91	—	—		Wicked: For Good – The Soundtrack
"No Good Deed"	2025	17	81	85	32	8	56	—	95		Wicked: For Good – The Soundtrack
"For Good" (with Ariana Grande)	2025	14	62	49	21	5	43	—	41		Wicked: For Good – The Soundtrack
"—" denotes a recording that did not chart or was not released in that territory.

=== Other appearances ===
Song	Year	Other artist(s)	Album
"Suddenly"	2013	Anderson & Petty	You Are Home: The Songs of Anderson & Petty
"Fly Before You Fall"	2014	N/A	Beyond the Lights (Original Motion Picture Soundtrack)
"Bridge Over Troubled Water"	2016	Alison Jiear	Inspirational
"Jump"	2017	N/A	Step (Music from and Inspired by the Motion Picture)
"When You Wish Upon a Star"	2017	Vera Lynn, Leigh Harline, & Manning Sherwin	Vera Lynn 100
"Alright"	2018	Anthony Ramos	The Freedom EP
"My Funny Valentine"	2018	Billy Porter	Billy Porter Presents: The Soul of Richard Rodgers
"Nobody"	2018	Todrick Hall & Jade Novah	Forbidden
"Si Pudiera Leer Tus Sueños"	2018	N/A	Singing You Home: Children's Songs for Family Reunification
"Hold On I'm Coming"	2018	N/A	Bad Times at the El Royale (Original Motion Picture Soundtrack)
"This Old Heart of Mine (Is Weak For You)"	2018	N/A	Bad Times at the El Royale (Original Motion Picture Soundtrack)
"Angels We Have Heard on High"	2019	Lea Michele	Christmas in the City
"Goodbye Song"	2019	Terence Blanchard	Harriet (Original Motion Picture Soundtrack)
"I Don't Know How to Love Him"	2020	—N/a	She is Risen: Volume One
"Winter Song"	2020	Leslie Odom Jr.	The Christmas Album
"Inside"	2021	Logic	Bobby Tarantino III
"Intro (feat. Cynthia Erivo)"	2024	Flo	Access All Areas
