= Wicked: For Good – The Soundtrack =

2025 soundtrack album by Wicked cast, Cynthia Erivo and Ariana Grande

Soundtrack album by Wicked Movie Cast, Cynthia Erivo and Ariana Grande
- Released: November 21, 2025
- Recorded: 2023
- Length: 44:53
- Labels: Republic; Verve
- Producers: Stephen Schwartz; Stephen Oremus; Greg Wells

Wicked chronology
Wicked: One Wonderful Night (2025)	Wicked: For Good – The Soundtrack (2025)	Wicked: For Good – The Original Motion Picture Score (2025)

Cynthia Erivo chronology
I Forgive You (2025)	Wicked: For Good – The Soundtrack (2025)

Ariana Grande chronology
Eternal Sunshine Deluxe: Brighter Days Ahead (2025)	Wicked: For Good – The Soundtrack (2025)	Petal (2026)

Wicked: For Good – The Soundtrack is the soundtrack album to the 2025 film Wicked: For Good by Jon M. Chu, which is based on the second act of the stage musical Wicked by Stephen Schwartz and Winnie Holzman. It was released by Republic Records and Verve Label Group on November 21, 2025, the same day as the film's theatrical release in the United States. Along with the film cast, the soundtrack is billed to Cynthia Erivo and Ariana Grande, the film's two main stars; Erivo appears on seven tracks out of eleven, while Grande appears on six.

== Background ==
The soundtrack album comprises 11 songs from the film, with most songs from the second act of the original stage musical being included. In November 2022, veteran Wicked composer Stephen Schwartz revealed the second film in the adaptation would have two new songs "to meet the demands of the storytelling", and that existing songs across both parts would receive new sections.

Schwartz's new songs, "No Place Like Home" and "The Girl in the Bubble", were revealed along with the rest of the soundtrack in September 2025. "No Place Like Home" was performed by Cynthia Erivo as Elphaba, and its title references Dorothy Gale's signature line "There's no place like home" from the film The Wizard of Oz (1939). "The Girl in the Bubble" was performed by Ariana Grande as Glinda. The actresses revealed the existence of each song in interviews with Variety's Awards Circuit podcast, while previews were featured in the film's trailers and the Wicked: One Wonderful Night special. Additionally, the start of "Thank Goodness" was sectioned into "Every Day More Wicked", which opens the album and the film.

The soundtrack also includes "The Wicked Witch of the East", performed by Erivo as Elphaba, Marissa Bode as Nessarose, and Ethan Slater as Boq. Though the song appears in the stage musical, it was originally excluded from the Broadway cast recording.

=== Differences from the musical ===
The opening section of "Thank Goodness" was expanded into its own musical number, "Every Day More Wicked". Primarily a reprise of "No One Mourns the Wicked", it also includes reprises of "The Wizard and I", "What is This Feeling?", and "Popular", along with a brief melody from "No Good Deed". Some lines originally sung by the ensemble were instead given to Madame Morrible. "Thank Goodness" (which is alternatively titled "I Couldn't Be Happier") also excludes Morrible's verse falsely explaining Glinda's rise to power.

"The Wicked Witch of the East" was revised to remove its ableist implications, emphasizing Nessarose's nostalgia for her and Boq's relationship rather than resentment for her condition. "Wonderful" now features Glinda prominently, including a reprise of "Defying Gravity" between her and Elphaba. The opening lyrics have also changed, while parts of the Wizard's bridge and Elphaba's line in the final chorus are cut.

Other changes include the reprise of "I'm Not That Girl" featuring additional instrumentation near the end, instead of directly leading into "As Long as You're Mine"; the exclusion of Elphaba screaming "Fiyero" at the start of "No Good Deed"; "March of the Witch Hunters" featuring an extended intro and excluding the heckling of various Ozians; and "For Good" featuring additional instrumentation. Dorothy Gale, who in the musical, can be seen around the Wizard's guards, is forced to take down Elphaba on her own.

== Release ==
The soundtrack album was released on November 21, 2025, in several formats, including digital download, streaming, CD, LP, and picture disc. It became available for pre-saving on June 5, 2025.

== Critical reception ==
Professional ratings
Review scores
Source	Rating
AllMusic	3.5/5 stars
Associated Press	3.5/5 stars

Elise Ryan of the Associated Press gave the album three-and-a-half stars out of five, praising "No Good Deed" as its "sonic peak", and complimenting the two original songs. However, she was critical of certain segments of dialog included on the soundtrack version of the songs. Marcy Donelson of AllMusic praised the "exceptional" vocals, especially in the title track, but generally called the songs "more flamboyant than tuneful".

== Accolades ==
Wicked: For Good – The Soundtrack awards and nominations
Organization	Year	Category	Result	Ref.
Black Reel Awards	2026	Outstanding Soundtrack	Nominated	
Hollywood Music in Media Awards	2025	Soundtrack Album	Nominated	
iHeartRadio Music Awards	2026	Favorite Soundtrack	Nominated	
NAACP Image Awards	2026	Outstanding Soundtrack/Compilation Album	Nominated	
St. Louis Film Critics Association	2025	Best Soundtrack	Nominated	

== Track listing ==
All tracks are written by Stephen Schwartz.

Wicked: For Good – The Soundtrack track listing
No.	Title	Performer(s)	Length
1.	"Every Day More Wicked"	Wicked Movie Cast and Cynthia Erivo featuring Michelle Yeoh and Ariana Grande	4:49
2.	"Thank Goodness / I Couldn't Be Happier"	Ariana Grande and Wicked Movie Cast featuring Michelle Yeoh	5:23
3.	"No Place Like Home"	Cynthia Erivo	3:51
4.	"The Wicked Witch of the East"	Marissa Bode, Cynthia Erivo, and Ethan Slater	3:23
5.	"Wonderful"	Jeff Goldblum, Ariana Grande, and Cynthia Erivo	4:45
6.	"I'm Not That Girl" (Reprise)	Ariana Grande	2:11
7.	"As Long as You're Mine"	Cynthia Erivo and Jonathan Bailey	4:07
8.	"No Good Deed"	Cynthia Erivo	3:50
9.	"March of the Witch Hunters"	Wicked Movie Cast and Ethan Slater	2:36
10.	"The Girl in the Bubble"	Ariana Grande	3:41
11.	"For Good"	Cynthia Erivo and Ariana Grande	6:17
Total length:			44:53

Japanese CD edition bonus tracks
No.	Title	Performer(s)	Length
12.	"For Good" (Live from the Gershwin Theatre)	Cynthia Erivo & Ariana Grande featuring Iding Menzel & Kristin Chenoweth	4:31
13.	"Defying Gravity" (Live from the Dolby Theatre)	Cynthia Erivo	3:44
14.	"Overture / No One Mourns The Wicked" (Live from the Dolby Theatre)	Ariana Grande	6:44
15.	"The Wizard And I" (Live from the Dolby Theatre)	Cynthia Erivo feat. Jeff Goldblum	5:53
Total length:			67:45

=== Notes ===
- The track "Finale" from the original Broadway cast recording has been adapted into the track "A Wicked Good Finale" in the film's score album.
- Commentary by Schwartz is included as an additional track on the Apple Music edition of the album.

== Personnel ==
Credits adapted from Tidal.

=== Orchestra ===
- Stephen Oremus – conductor

==== Keyboards ====
- Stephen Schwartz – piano, keyboards
- Greg Wells – piano, keyboards
- Stephen Oremus – piano, keyboards
- Dominick Amendum – keyboards
- Simon Chamberlain – piano

==== Percussion ====
- Greg Wells – drums, percussion
- Bobby Ball – percussion
- Chris Baron – percussion
- Dave Elliott – percussion
- Julian Poole – percussion
- Rob Farrer – percussion
- Jeremy Cornes – timpani

==== Strings ====
- Greg Wells – acoustic guitar, electric guitar, EBow, six-string banjo, bass guitar
- Chris Allan – cello
- Ian Burdge – cello
- Jonathan Tunnell – cello
- Katherine Jenkinson – cello
- Nick Cooper – cello
- Rachael Lander – cello
- Sophie Harris – cello
- Tony Woollard – cello
- Beth Symmons – double bass
- Dominic Worsley – double bass
- Mary Scully – double bass
- Melissa Favell-Wright – double bass
- Roger Linley – double bass
- Steve Mair – double bass
- Steve Rossell – double bass
- Helen Tunstall – harp
- Hugh Webb – harp
- Catherine Bradshaw – viola
- Clare Finnimore – viola
- Clive Howard – viola
- Edward Vanderspar – viola
- Fiona Leggat – viola
- Katie Wilkinson – viola
- Lydia Lowndes-Northcott – viola
- Morgan Goff – viola
- Nick Barr – viola
- Rachel Roberts – viola
- Andrew Harvey – violin
- Ben Buckton – violin
- Ciaran McCabe – violin
- Clare Thompson – violin
- Clio Gould – violin
- Daniel Bhattacharya – violin
- David Williams – violin
- Debbie Widdup – violin
- Emil Chakalov – violin
- Everton Nelson – violin
- Ian Humphries – violin
- John Mills – violin
- Jonathan Morton – violin
- Julian Leaper – violin
- Julian Tear – violin
- Kirsty Mangan – violin
- Laura Melhuish – violin
- Matthew Ward – violin
- Miranda Dale – violin
- Natalia Bonner – violin
- Nicky Sweeney – violin
- Nicolette Kuo – violin
- Richard George – violin
- Sarah Sexton – violin
- Victoria Gill – violin

==== Brass ====
- Owen Slade – cimbasso
- Peter Smith – cimbasso
- Anna Douglass – French horn
- Annemarie Federle – French horn
- Corinne Bailey – French horn
- John Ryan – French horn
- Michael Thompson – French horn
- Nick Hougham – French horn
- Nigel Black – French horn
- Andy Wood – trombone
- Barry Clements – trombone
- Ed Tarrant – trombone
- Peter Moore – trombone
- Daniel Newell – trumpet
- Kate Moore – trumpet
- Patrick White – trumpet
- Phillip Cobb – trumpet

==== Woodwinds ====
- Gavin McNaughton – bassoon
- Paul Boyes – bassoon
- Rachel Simms – bassoon
- Sarah Burnett – bassoon
- David Fuest – clarinet
- Jordan Black – clarinet
- Maura Marinucci – clarinet
- Tim Lines – clarinet
- David Cuthbert – flute
- Helen Keen – flute
- Karen Jones – flute
- Gareth Hulse – oboe
- Janey Miller – oboe
- Ruth Berresford – oboe
- Tom Blomfield – oboe

==== Vocals ====
- Allie Trimm – background vocals (tracks 1, 2)
- Allsun O'Malley – background vocals (1, 2)
- Alyssa Fox – background vocals (1, 2)
- Anne Fraser Thomas – background vocals (1, 2)
- Annika Reese Franklin – background vocals (1, 2)
- Austin Elle Fisher – background vocals (1, 2)
- Cate Cozzens – background vocals (1, 2)
- Daniel James Drews – background vocals (1, 2)
- Derrick Deshawn Williams – background vocals (1, 2)
- Erik Alan Altimus – background vocals (1, 2)
- Isabell Ye – background vocals (1, 2)
- Jackson Hayes – background vocals (1, 2)
- Jason Goldston – background vocals (1, 2)
- Jesse JP Johnson – background vocals (1, 2)
- Larkin Bogan – background vocals (1, 2)
- Lindsay Mendez – background vocals (1, 2)
- Marco Amendum – background vocals (1, 2)
- Marcus Choi – background vocals (1, 2)
- Matilda Eusebio – background vocals (1, 2)
- Meg Doherty – background vocals (1, 2)
- Michael Allen Cole – background vocals (1, 2)
- Michael McCorry Rose – background vocals (1, 2)
- Michael Seelbach – background vocals (1, 2)
- Nicholas Bernard Ward – background vocals (1, 2)
- Nikki Renée Daniels – background vocals (1, 2)
- Nora Winer – background vocals (1, 2)
- Oyoyo Joi Bonner – background vocals (1, 2)
- Patricia Phillips – background vocals (1, 2)
- Samantha Massell – background vocals (1, 2)
- Scarlett Diviney – background vocals (1, 2)
- Skylar Bohon Oremus – background vocals (1, 2)
- Theo Lowenstein – background vocals (1, 2)
- Troy Iwata – background vocals (1, 2)
- Wendi Bergamini – background vocals (1, 2)
- Clare Brice – additional vocals (2)
- Lucy Frederick – additional vocals (2)
- Summer Strallen Minal Patel – additional vocals (2)

=== Technical ===
- Greg Wells – production, mixing
- Stephen Oremus – production, recording arrangement
- Stephen Schwartz – production
- Marisa Torbert – music production
- Ariana Grande – vocal production
- Cynthia Erivo – vocal production
- Robin Baynton – engineering, vocal editing
- Nick Wollage – recording, mixing
- Ian Kagey – recording
- Laurence Anslow – mixing
- Randy Merrill – mastering
- Adam Magson – additional engineering
- John Prestage – additional engineering
- Ellen Cordisco – additional mixing
- Jason Soudah – additional mixing
- Ashley Andrew-Jones – digital editing
- Catherine Wilson – digital editing
- Jack Dolman – digital editing
- Millie Davies – production assistance
- Dominick Amendum – recording arrangement, recording supervision
- Jeff Atmajian – recording arrangement
- Maggie Rodford – recording supervision
- Serban Ghenea – consultation

== Charts ==
Chart performance for Wicked: For Good – The Soundtrack
Chart (2025–2026)	Peak position
Australian Albums (ARIA)	1
Austrian Albums (Ö3 Austria)	6
Belgian Albums (Ultratop Flanders)	3
Belgian Albums (Ultratop Wallonia)	4
Canadian Albums (Billboard)	9
Croatian International Albums (HDU)	30
Dutch Albums (Album Top 100)	1
French Albums (SNEP)	15
German Albums (Offizielle Top 100)	6
Greek Albums (IFPI)	31
Icelandic Albums (Tónlistinn)	25
Irish Compilation Albums (IRMA)	1
Italian Albums (FIMI)	28
Japanese Albums (Oricon)	37
Japanese Digital Albums (Oricon)	12
Japanese Hot Albums (Billboard Japan)	37
New Zealand Albums (RMNZ)	5
Norwegian Albums (IFPI Norge)	55
Polish Albums (ZPAV)	19
Portuguese Albums (AFP)	14
Spanish Albums (Promusicae)	5
Swedish Albums (Sverigetopplistan)	28
Swiss Albums (Schweizer Hitparade)	18
UK Compilation Albums (Official Charts)	1
UK Soundtrack Albums (Official Charts)	1
US Billboard 200	2
US Soundtrack Albums (Billboard)	1

== Certifications ==
Certifications for Wicked: For Good – The Soundtrack
Region	Certification	Certified units/sales
United Kingdom (BPI)	Silver	60,000^{‡}
^{‡} Sales+streaming figures based on certification alone.

== Release history ==
Release history and formats for Wicked: For Good – The Soundtrack
Region	Date	Format(s)	Editions(s)	Label(s)	Ref.
Various	November 21, 2025	Digital download; streaming; CD; LP; picture disc	Standard	Republic; Verve	
