= Rachel Tucker =

Northern Irish actress and singer

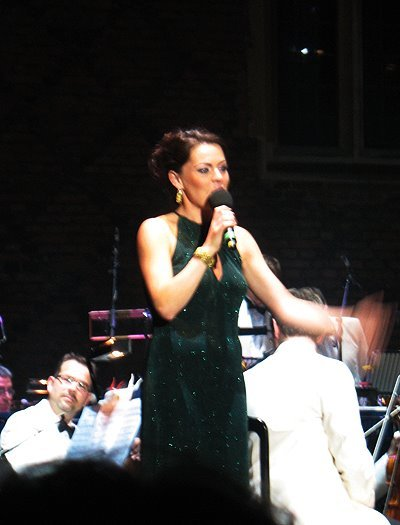
- Tucker performing at Hampton Court Palace in 2009
- Born: Rachel Kelly Tucker; 29 May 1981 (age 45); Belfast, Northern Ireland
- Occupations: Actress, singer
- Years active: 2000–present
- Spouse: Guy Retallack
- Children: 1
- Awards: Nominated for Best Supporting Actress at the Olivier Awards 2019
- Website: www.racheltucker.co.uk

Rachel Kelly Tucker (born 29 May 1981) is a Northern Irish actress and singer, best known for her portrayal of Elphaba in the musical Wicked in the West End and on Broadway. She also starred in the West End and Broadway productions of Come from Away, Sunset Boulevard, Hadestown, The Great Gatsby, The Last Ship.

== Early life and career ==
Tucker was born in Belfast, Northern Ireland, and grew up singing on the cabaret circuit from the age of nine with her father, Tommy (Tucker) Kelly and sister Margaret Kelly under the group's name Tucker Kelly and the Kelstar. She was a member of the Arts Youth Theatre during the late 1990s featuring in shows such as Ecstasy and Our Day Out. She then went on to feature in Michael Poyner's version of the Rockin Mikado as Katisha. In 2001, she competed in the Irish version of Popstars, featuring prominently in episode 3 where she is featured singing "Ain't No Mountain High Enough". Her contestant number was B0161. She also featured as a contestant with sister Margaret on Michael Barrymore's My Kind of Music singing "Man! I Feel Like a Woman!". She also competed in the talent show Star for a Night making the final with her performance of "Kids".

Tucker trained at the Royal Academy of Music. She worked with Any Dream Will Do winner Lee Mead in the 2005 United Kingdom tour of the Rock musical, Tommy as Sally Simpson. In December 2007, Tucker appeared as Dorothy Gale in the Royal Shakespeare Company adaptation of The Wizard of Oz at the Lyric Theatre in Belfast. The Stage described her performance as "looking and sounding uncannily like the legendary Garland". For her performance, she was nominated for an award in the 2008 TMA Awards. Tucker recorded a version of the civil rights anthem "Ain't Gonna Let Nobody Turn Me Around" which was used in a television advertisement for Libresse in 2005 entitled "March".

== I'd Do Anything ==
Tucker was chosen as one of the twelve finalists on the show in which began in March 2008, appearing each week in the live show on Saturday evenings and the results shows which aired each Sunday. She made it to the semi-finals in week nine where she was eliminated on 25 May. In week six, she was in the bottom two with Sarah Lark, with Tucker having received the lowest number of viewers votes. In the results show on 4 May 2008, they sang "As If We Never Said Goodbye", from the musical Sunset Boulevard. Andrew Lloyd Webber chose to save Tucker and eliminate Lark, saying: "I have to think as a producer and I do think Rachel was rock solid."

Tucker was once again in the bottom two in week eight, the quarter-final stage of the series. She was in the sing-off for a second time, this time with Niamh Perry, with Perry having received the lowest number of viewers votes. They sang "Another Suitcase in Another Hall" from the musical Evita. Lloyd Webber chose to save Tucker and eliminate Perry.

At the semi-final stage, week nine, Tucker was in the bottom two for a third time, together with Samantha Barks, who had received the lowest number of viewers votes. They sang "Memory" from the musical Cats. Cameron Mackintosh joined the judging panel for this episode. Lloyd Webber chose to save Barks and eliminate Tucker saying: "Last night Cameron and I were both saying that we thought both of you would be fantastic Nancys and now here am I faced with this. But I've got to make a decision and I've got to think of where the show ultimately for Cameron is going to go and I think I have to go with you Samantha. A week after the show, Lloyd Webber said: "The fact is Cameron wanted Rachel to stay. He wanted Rachel and Samantha in the final from the beginning of the series. Rachel did a fantastic performance but I had to face up to the fact that she wouldn't have gone any further. What I may think professionally is sometimes different to what the public want. I saved Rachel three times and she still ended up in the bottom two."

=== Performances on I'd Do Anything ===
Show	Song	Original Artist	Result	Bottom Two Performance
Week One	"About You Now"	Sugababes	Safe	—N/a
Week Two	"Beautiful"	Christina Aguilera	Safe	—N/a
Week Three	"Oh, What a Night"	The Four Seasons	Safe	—N/a
Week Four	"The Way We Were"	Barbra Streisand	Safe	—N/a
Week Five	"I'm with You"	Avril Lavigne	Safe	—N/a
Week Six	"For Once in My Life"	Stevie Wonder	Bottom Two	"As If We Never Said Goodbye" (Sunset Boulevard)
Week Seven	"You've Got a Friend"	Carole King	Safe	—N/a
Week Eight (quarter-final)	"I Will Always Love You"	Dolly Parton	Bottom Two	"Another Suitcase in Another Hall" (Evita)
Week Nine (semi-final)	"Cabaret"	Cabaret	Eliminated	"Memory" (Cats)

== West End and Broadway stardom ==
In July 2008, Tucker took part in a private workshop performance of the first act of the sequel to The Phantom of The Opera (Love Never Dies) at Andrew Lloyd Webber's private Sydmonton Festival near his estate in Hampshire, in which she sang the role of Meg Giry. On 2 August 2008, in Belfast, she performed at the Gay Pride Festival. She sang a medley which included excerpts from Cabaret, "All That Jazz", "Maybe This Time" and "Don't Rain on My Parade". On 13 September 2008, she performed alongside fellow I'd Do Anything finalist Niamh Perry at the Proms in the Park, held at Belfast City Hall as part of the nationwide celebration of the BBC Last Night of the Proms. The following day, she performed at Andrew Lloyd Webber's Birthday in the Park' show in Hyde Park, London, singing "Light at the End of The Tunnel" from Starlight Express. In November 2008, Tucker filmed a West End special of The Weakest Link in which she was voted off first. The show was aired on BBC1 during the 2008 Christmas schedule. In late 2009, she was a judge on amateur comedy show Find Me the Funny and presented The Friday Show, a six-part entertainment series with Eamonn Holmes, both for BBC Northern Ireland.

=== We Will Rock You ===
From 22 September 2008, for one year, Tucker played Meat in the jukebox musical We Will Rock You, at the Dominion Theatre, London, under the direction of Christopher Renshaw. A review of the opening night performance of the show in The Stage newspaper said of Tucker's debut that she had "found the perfect stage for her large voice. Her rendition of "No-One but You (Only the Good Die Young)" is one of the highlights of a first act that works on many levels." Tucker was also the first understudy to Sabrina Aloueche for the role of Scaramouche, and played the role on many occasions to cover Aloueche's holidays.

=== Wicked ===
Tucker starred as Elphaba in the West End production of the musical Wicked, at the Apollo Victoria Theatre, under the direction of Joe Mantello. She replaced Alexia Khadime on 29 March 2010, starring opposite Louise Dearman (also her debut) as Glinda. For the entirety of her run, Nikki Davis-Jones was her standby, and went on during Tucker's holidays and other absences. On 1 August 2011, it was revealed that Tucker had extended her contract with the production into October 2012. In June 2012, she succeeded Kerry Ellis as the longest-running West End Elphaba.

For her portrayal of Elphaba, Tucker won a 2011 WhatsOnStage.com Award in the category of Best Takeover in a Role. She performed "The Wizard and I" at West End Live 2010 and the Laurence Olivier Awards 2012, and "Defying Gravity" at Pride London. On 13 February 2011, she performed "Defying Gravity" as part of a theatre-themed episode of Dancing on Ice for ITV. Tucker also sang the same hit song at West End Live 2011 which was held at Trafalgar Square.

On 10 September 2011, Tucker was joined on stage by Stacey Solomon to sing "For Good" at the end of the show. This was in aid of BBC Children in Need's Pop Goes the Musical, where a whole host of celebrities graced the stages of the West End of London to raise awareness for the charity's 2011 appeal. On 19 March 2012, Tucker won the West End Frame Award for Best Performance of a Song in a Musical for her performance of "Defying Gravity". Tucker left the role on 27 October 2012 for maternity leave, after over 900 performances. Dearman took over the role on 29 October 2012.

She reprised the role of Elphaba in the Broadway production from 15 September 2015 at the Gershwin Theatre. Tucker played her final performance on 30 July 2016 and was replaced by Jennifer DiNoia. For her performance in the Broadway production, Tucker was the recipient of the 2016 Best Female Replacement Award at the 2016 Broadway.com Audience Awards.

Tucker returned to the West End production of Wicked, leading the show's 10th Anniversary Cast in London, on 5 September 2016 and played a limited run as Elphaba until 28 January 2017. With over 1,000 performances both in the West End and on Broadway, Tucker remains one of the longest-running Elphabas in the show's history.

=== Farragut North ===
Tucker starred in Farragut North playing the role of Ida, which premiered in London at the Southwark Playhouse on 11 September 2013. Produced by Peter Huntley, in association with Daniel Krupnik and Southwark Playhouse, Directed by Guy Unsworth and with original music by Jude Obermüller, the production also starred Max Irons in the role of Stephen, and features Shaun Williamson, Aysha Kala, Josh O'Connor, Alain Terzoli and Andrew Whipp.

=== The Last Ship ===
Tucker returned to Broadway in The Last Ship which began at the Neil Simon Theatre on 30 September 2014. The musical follows the story of shipbuilders in the North East of England using music from Sting's album of the same name. It also starred Michael Esper and Jimmy Nail. The production closed on 24 January 2015.

=== Rachel Tucker: Back from Broadway ===
On 19 April 2015, Tucker hosted two performances, one at 3pm and one at 7pm, at the St James theatre in London with the 7pm show being completely sold out. The special guests that appeared to sing songs with Tucker were George Macguire and Giles Terera, as well as a special performance with her own sister. Tucker sang 24 of her favourite songs, and also talked about her recent experience on Broadway.

=== Communicating Doors ===
She appeared off-West End in Communicating Doors at the Menier Chocolate Factory. The show began on 7 May 2015 and closed on 27 June 2015.

=== UK Tour ===
Tucker gave three intimate concerts at 'Live at Zédel' in London towards the end of March 2017. The concerts were directed by Tucker's husband, Guy Retallack, with musical director Kris Rawlinson. Reviews praised the performances of both Tucker and Rawlinson. The two followed up with an 11-date UK tour, visiting cities and towns such as Belfast, Cardiff, Bury St. Edmunds and Birmingham, beginning in Belfast on 13 May and finishing in Birmingham on 10 June. They recorded an album, On the Road, a compilation of some of the songs performed on the tour. The album was only available as a physical copy.

=== Come from Away ===
Tucker played the roles of Beverley and others in the London production of Come from Away from February 2019. She was nominated for a Laurence Olivier Award for Best Actress in a Supporting Role in a Musical for this role. She left the production on 8 February 2020. She reprises her roles in the Broadway production of the show from 3 March 2020 until production was suspended the following week due to the COVID-19 pandemic.

=== John & Jen ===
She starred alongside Lewis Cornay in a production of the musical John & Jen. The show was directed by Tucker's husband, Guy Retallack, and had a limited run from July 28, 2021, to August 21, 2021. It received praise from critics, with Theatre Weekly writing that the two leads had "an exquisite chemistry" and that Tucker was "unsurprisingly, incredible in the role of Jen" while Gay Times wrote "We were expecting big things from West End and Broadway star Rachel Tucker and she truly delivers", noting also that the production was "easily one of the most ambitious and polished musicals we've seen in a studio theatre".

=== Sunset Boulevard ===
In the 2023 West End revival of Andrew Lloyd Webber's Sunset Boulevard Tucker played Norma Desmond as alternate to Nicole Scherzinger on Monday evenings from October 16 until the end of the limited run.

=== Hadestown ===
In the West End production of Hadestown, she was a replacement in the role of Persephone from October 15, 2024, to February 9, 2025.

=== The Great Gatsby ===
She originated the role of Myrtle Wilson in the West End production of The Great Gatsby at the London Coliseum in April 2025 and is expected to continue in the role until September 2025.

== Filmography and theatre credits ==
=== Television ===
Year	Title	Role	Notes
2001	Popstars	Herself	
2008	I'd Do Anything	Herself	
2008	BBC Last Night of the Proms	Herself	
2008	Andrew Lloyd Webber's Birthday in the Park	Herself	
2009	The Weakest Link West End Stars Special	Herself	
2009	The Friday Show	Herself	
2017	Julie’s Greenroom	Herself	
2018	Informer	Sharon Collins	
2021	Holby City	Kathy Peters	
2022-23	Hope Street	Siobhan O’Hare	
2025	Call the Midwife	Peggy Wrigley	

=== Theatre Credits ===
Year	Title	Role	Theatre	Category
2004	Rent	Maureen	Olympia Theatre	Dublin
2005	The Who's Tommy	Sally Simpson	—N/a	UK National Tour
2007	The Wizard of Oz	Dorothy Gale	Lyric Theatre, Belfast	Belfast
2008	Love Never Dies	Meg Giry	Sydmonton Festival	Off West End
2008	We Will Rock You	Meat / Understudy Scaramouche	Dominion Theatre	West End
2010-2012	Wicked	Elphaba	Apollo Victoria Theatre	West End
2013	Farragut North	Ida	Southwark Playhouse	Off West End
2014	The Last Ship	Meg Dawson	Bank of America Theatre	Chicago
2014	The Last Ship	Meg Dawson	Neil Simon Theatre	Broadway
2015	Rachel Tucker: Back From Broadway	Herself	The Other Palace	Off West End
2015	Communicating Doors	Poopay	Menier Chocolate Factory	Off West End
2015-2016	Wicked	Elphaba	Gershwin Theatre	Broadway
2016-2017	Wicked	Elphaba	Apollo Victoria Theatre	West End
2017	Rachel Tucker: UK Tour	Herself	—N/a	UK National Tour
2018	Lempicka	The Baroness	Williamstown Theatre Festival	Regional
2018-2019	Come From Away	Beverley Bass & Others	Abbey Theatre	Dublin
2019-2020	Come From Away	Beverley Bass & Others	Phoenix Theatre	West End
2020	The Pirate Queen	Grace O'Malley	London Coliseum	West End
2020	Songs for a New World	Woman 2	London Palladium	West End
2020	Come from Away	Beverley Bass & Others	Gerald Schoenfeld Theatre	Broadway
2021	John & Jen	Jen Tracy	Southwark Playhouse	Off-West End
2022	Do You Hear The People Sing?	Concert Soloist	Sydney Opera House	Australia
2023	John & Jen: A Concert Celebration	Jen Tracy	54 Below	Broadway
2023	Annie Get Your Gun	Annie Oakley	London Palladium	West End
2023-2024	Sunset Boulevard	Norma Desmond	Savoy Theatre	West End
2023	Rachel Tucker in Concert	Herself	Cadogan Hall	West End
2024	Side Show	Violet	London Palladium	West End
2024	Wild About You	Olivia	Theatre Royal, Drury Lane	West End
2024	Do You Hear The People Sing?	Concert Soloist	Hollywood Bowl	Off Broadway
2024	Ottillie: a rehearsed reading	Ottillie Paterson	Metropolitan Arts Centre	Belfast
2024-2025	Hadestown	Persephone	Lyric Theatre	West End
2025	The Great Gatsby	Myrtle Wilson	London Coliseum	West End
2025	Midnight	Charlotte	Sadler's Wells East	Off West End
2026	Into the Woods	The Baker's Wife	Bridge Theatre	London
2026	Thelma & Louise	Louise	Young Vic	London

== Recordings ==
- "Rain On Me" on the album More with Every Line - The Music of Tim Prottey-Jones (December 2010)
- "Stones" on The Violent Language of Portraits by Tonic Fold (February 2014)
- The Last Ship Original Broadway cast recording (December 2015)
- Alongside Eamonn McCrystal, Tucker sings "Chasing Cars" on the album The Music of Northern Ireland. There are also live recordings of "Life Love Happiness" and "The Island" (February 2015)
- "As Long as You're Mine" on Lee Mead's 10 Year Anniversary Album (February 2018)
- "Oh Holy Night" on West End Does: Christmas (December 2018)
- "Shallow" with Jon Robyns on his album Musical Direction (September 2019)
- Schwartz Songs - a new version of "Defying Gravity" alongside Kerry Ellis, Alice Fearn, and Lucie Jones. She also recorded a solo version of "The Wizard and I" for the album, celebrating the work of Stephen Schwartz (July 2024)

On 25 March 2013, it was announced that Tucker had been signed to Big Hand Recordings in a joint venture with Elate Studio and would release her debut solo album on 22 July 2013.

=== The Reason ===
On 11 August 2013, The Reason was released digitally and physical copies began to ship.

No.	Title	Originally by	Length
1.	"The Reason"	Celine Dion
2.	"Small Bump"	Ed Sheeran
3.	"Stone Cold Sober"	Paloma Faith
4.	"No One But You"	Queen
5.	"My Immortal"	Evanescence
6.	"One Night Only"	Tom Eyen
7.	"I'll Cover You"	Cast of RENT
8.	"Defying Gravity"	Stephen Schwartz
9.	"Gone Too Soon"	Michael Jackson
10.	"Al Jolson and Judy Garland Medley with Rachel's Dad"	Al Jolson and Judy Garland

On 17 July 2013, it was announced that there will be a delay with the album release, with the new release date expected to be 12 August. The album launch concert went ahead on 25 July, effectively meaning those that had pre-ordered the album were not the first to hear the songs as planned.

=== On the Road ===
On 16 November 2017, On the Road was released digitally on iTunes.

No.	Title	Originally by	Length
1.	"Miss. Otis Regrets (She's Unable To Lunch Today)"	Cole Porter
2.	"The Candy Man"	Sammy Davis Jr.
3.	"Waving Through a Window"	Pasek and Paul
4.	"When She Loved Me"	Sarah McLachlan
5.	"Where is Love?"	Lionel Bart
6.	"Another Life"
7.	"You Matter to Me"	Sara Bareilles
8.	"I Can't Make You Love Me"	Bonnie Raitt
9.	"The Man That Got Away"	Judy Garland
10.	"She Moved Through The Fair"	Irish folk song
11.	"Hand in Hand"	Kerrigan-Lowdermilk
12.	"I'm Falling"	Original Song
13.	"I Can Cook, Too"	Leonard Bernstein
14.	"That's Life"	Frank Sinatra
15.	"She Used to Be Mine"	Sara Bareilles
16.	"No Good Deed"	Stephen Schwartz
17.	"Goodbye Yellow Brick Road"	Elton John
18.	"Castle on the Hill"	Ed Sheeran

=== Lessons ===
On 21 May 2021, Lessons was released digitally and on CD.

No.	Title	Originally by	Length
1.	"What About Us - Acoustic Version"
2.	"The Ship Song"	Nick Cave
3.	"The View"
4.	"Blackbird"	The Beatles
5.	"Angel"	Sarah McLachlan
6.	"What About Us"

=== You’re Already Home ===
On 3 November 2023, Rachel released her new album, You’re Already Home. It was released digitally and on CD.

No.	Title	Originally by	Length
1.	"It's Time"	Imagine Dragons
2.	"He's My Boy"	from Everybody’s Talking About Jamie
3.	"Party of One"	Brandi Carlile
4.	"Following the River"	The Rolling Stones
5.	"I'm Gonna Be Strong"	Gene Pitney / Cyndi Lauper
6.	"Wouldn't it be Loverly"	from My Fair Lady
7.	"I'm Home"	Composed by Caroline Kay
8.	"All Right Now"	Free (band)
9.	"Happier Than Ever (feat. Jamie Muscato)"	Billie Eilish
10.	"It All Fades Away (with Jason Robert Brown)"	from The Bridges of Madison County
11.	"Before You Go (feat. Sam Young)"	Lewis Capaldi
12.	"Everything Changes"	from Waitress
13.	"Whole of the Moon"	The Waterboys

== Personal life ==
In 2009, she married theatre director Guy Retallack. the couple have one son, born in February 2013.
