= Wicked (musical album) =

2003 cast recording album

Cast recording by Wicked Cast
- Released: December 16, 2003
- Recorded: November 10, 2003
- Genre: Showtunes
- Length: 70:37
- Label: Decca Broadway
- Producer: Stephen Schwartz

Wicked chronology
Wicked (2003)	Wicked: The Soundtrack (2024)

Wicked is a cast recording containing the majority of the songs from the Tony Award-winning Broadway musical Wicked, with music and lyrics by composer Stephen Schwartz and a book by writer Winnie Holzman. Released on December 16, 2003, by Decca Broadway both in physical and digital releases. The former contains a foreword and a short synopsis, provided by Gregory Maguire, who wrote the 1995 novel on which the musical is based, in addition to lyrics to those songs included.

The composer and lyricist of Wicked, Stephen Schwartz produced the album, aided by Frank Filipetti, Jill Dell'Abate, Jason Spears, Justin Shturtz, Jason Stasium and Ted Jensen. The original cast album of Wicked was recorded on November 10, 2003, with the full cast and orchestra, at then-Right Track Studios and mastered at Sterling Sound in New York City.

Though initial reviews were mixed, the album received positive reappraisal and substantive commercial success over the years. In 2005, it received the Grammy Award for Best Musical Show Album. The album peaked at number 33 on the US Billboard 200 in 2024 and has been certified triple platinum by the Recording Industry Association of America (RIAA). The album was recorded by the cast of the musical's two-part film adaptation and released as Wicked: The Soundtrack and Wicked: For Good – The Soundtrack.

== Track listing ==
All tracks are written by Stephen Schwartz.

No.	Title	Performer(s)	Length
1.	"Overture / No One Mourns the Wicked"	Kristin Chenoweth; Sean McCourt; Cristy Candler; Jan Neuberger; Original Broadway Cast of Wicked	6:40
2.	"Dear Old Shiz"	Chenoweth; Cast	1:26
3.	"The Wizard and I"	Idina Menzel; Carole Shelley	5:09
4.	"What Is This Feeling?"	Chenoweth; Menzel; Cast	3:32
5.	"Something Bad"	William Youmans; Menzel	1:39
6.	"Dancing Through Life"	Norbert Leo Butz; Chenoweth; Christopher Fitzgerald; Michelle Federer; Menzel; Cast	7:37
7.	"Popular"	Chenoweth	3:44
8.	"I'm Not That Girl"	Menzel	2:58
9.	"One Short Day"	Chenoweth; Menzel; Cast	3:03
10.	"A Sentimental Man"	Joel Grey	1:15
11.	"Defying Gravity"	Menzel; Chenoweth; Cast	5:53
12.	"No One Mourns the Wicked (Reprise) / Thank Goodness"	Chenoweth; Shelley; Cast	6:22
13.	"Wonderful"	Grey; Menzel	4:57
14.	"I'm Not That Girl (Reprise)"	Chenoweth	0:49
15.	"As Long as You're Mine"	Menzel; Butz	3:45
16.	"No Good Deed"	Menzel	3:31
17.	"March of the Witch Hunters"	Fitzgerald; Cast	1:30
18.	"For Good"	Chenoweth; Menzel	5:06
19.	"Finale: For Good (Reprise)"	Chenoweth; Menzel; Cast	1:41
Total length:			71:15

=== Notes ===
- The reprise of "No One Mourns the Wicked" is attached to the beginning of "Thank Goodness".
- "The Wicked Witch of the East", sung by Nessarose, Elphaba, and Boq, is missing from the album. Producers deemed it too difficult to arrange for the album and thought the song would give too much of the plot away to an audience who had never seen Wicked before.
- Short reprises of "The Wizard and I" and "A Sentimental Man", that appear in Act I and II respectively, are not included.

== German language recording ==
In 2007, the original Stuttgart cast rerecorded the Wicked album in German, ahead of the opening of the German production in Stuttgart that year. The title of this album was Wicked Das Musical - Die Hexen von Oz. The German lyrics are by Michael Kunze and German dialogue by Ruth Deny, conducted by Sebastian de Domenico. The orchestral music conducted by Stephen Oremus and has identical musician credits—presumably the cast simply sung to the original orchestral recording.

All tracks are written by Stephen Schwartz.

No.	Title	Performer(s)	Length
1.	"Keiner weint um Hexen"	Lucy Scherer; Stefan Poslovoski; Emma Hunter; Francesca Taverni; Original Stuttgart Cast of Wicked	6:42
2.	"Gutes altes Glizz"	Cast	1:26
3.	"Der Zauberer und ich"	Angelika Wedekind; Willemijn Verkaik	5:12
4.	"Was fühl ich in mir?"	Scherer; Verkaik; Cast	3:36
5.	"Nicht ist mehr geheuer"	Michael Günther; Verkaik	1:41
6.	"Tanz durch die Welt"	Mark Seibert; Scherer; Stefan Stara; Nicole Radeschnig; Verkaik; Cast	7:38
7.	"Heißgeliebt"	Lucy Scherer	3:48
8.	"Ich bin es nicht"	Verkaik	3:02
9.	"Nur ein Tag"	Scherer; Verkaik; Cast	3:05
10.	"Ein seelenvoller Mann"	Carlo Lauber	1:18
11.	"Frei und Schwerelos"	Scherer; Verkaik; Cast	6:00
12.	"Wie herrlich"	Scherer; Wedekind; Cast	6:25
13.	"Wundervoll"	Lauber; Verkaik	5:00
14.	"Ich bin es nicht (Reprise)"	Scherer	0:52
15.	"Solang ich dich hab"	Verkaik; Seibert	3:48
16.	"Gutes tun"	Verkaik	3:33
17.	"Marsch der Hexenjäger"	Stara; Cast	1:33
18.	"Wie ich bin"	Scherer; Verkaik	5:10
19.	"Finale"	Scherer; Verkaik; Cast	1:42

=== Personnel ===
Cast

- Willemijn Verkaik – Elphaba
- Lucy Scherer – Galinda, later Glinda
- Mark Seibert – Fiyero
- Carlo Lauber – Der Zauberer von Oz
- Angelika Wedekind – Madame Akaber
- Nicole Radeschnig – Nessarose
- Stefan Stara – Moq
- Michael Günther – Dr. Dillamonth

Alternates

- Sabrina Weckerlin – Elphaba
- Jana Stelley – Glinda

Ensemble vocals

- Cosimo de Bartolomeo
- Paul Boereboom
- Alan Byland
- Heather Carino
- Alessandro Cococcia
- Ben Cox
- Matthias Dressel
- Belinda Jean Edwards
- Marco Fahrland
- Rhys George
- Maria Graciano
- Sam Hale
- Kisha Howard
- Emma Hunter
- Michael Kargus
- Jessica Lantto
- Jimmy Laremore
- Valerie Link
- Artur Molin
- Jens Simon Petersen
- Stefan Poslovski
- Rey Rodriguez
- Barbara Schmid
- Lanie Sumalinog
- Maike Switzer
- Francesca Taverni
- Roberta Valentini

== Fifth anniversary special edition ==
A fifth anniversary special edition of the original Broadway cast recording was released on October 28, 2008, with a bonus CD including tracks "Dancing Through Life", "Popular", "As Long as You're Mine" and "No Good Deed" from the Japanese and German cast recordings of Wicked, "I'm Not That Girl" by Kerry Ellis, "Making Good" – a song that never made the final show – by Stephanie J. Block, Menzel's dance mix of "Defying Gravity", and "For Good" sung by LeAnn Rimes and Delta Goodrem.

=== Bonus CD track listing ===
No.	Title	Performer(s)	Length
1.	"For Good"	LeAnn Rimes; Delta Goodrem	4:15
2.	"I'm Not That Girl"	Kerry Ellis	3:49
3.	"Making Good"	Stephanie J. Block; Stephen Schwartz	4:00
4.	"Solang ich dich hab" (German: "As Long As You're Mine")	Willemijn Verkaik; Mark Seibert	3:47
5.	"Gutes tun" (German: "No Good Deed")	Willemijn Verkaik	3:33
6.	"Jinnsei wo Odori-Akase" (Japanese: "Dancing Through Life")	Li Tao; Company	7:37
7.	"Popyuraa" (Japanese: "Popular")	Miyuki Numao	3:45
8.	"Defying Gravity" (Dance Mix - Tracy Young Flying Monkey Radio Mix)	Idina Menzel	3:44

== Deluxe edition ==
The set of two CDs included new deluxe packaging featuring the show's tenth anniversary artwork, and a booklet with new essays by composer and lyricist Stephen Schwartz, and Gregory Maguire, the author of Wicked: The Life and Times of the Wicked Witch of the West, the novel on which the musical is based. The set was released digitally on October 29, 2013, and arrived in stores soon after on November 19.

=== Track listing ===
No.	Title	Performer(s)	Length
1.	"For Good"	LeAnn Rimes; Delta Goodrem	4:15
2.	"I'm Not That Girl"	Kerry Ellis	3:49
3.	"Making Good"	Stephanie J. Block; Stephen Schwartz	4:00
4.	"Solang Ich Dich Hab" (German: "As Long As You're Mine")	Willemijn Verkaik; Mark Seibert	3:47
5.	"Gutes Tun" (German: "No Good Deed")	Willemijn Verkaik	3:33
6.	"Jinnsei Wo Odori-Akase" (Japanese: "Dancing Through Life")	Li Tao; Company	7:37
7.	"Popyuraa" (Japanese: "Popular")	Miyuki Numao	3:45
8.	"Defying Gravity" (Dance Mix - Tracy Young Flying Monkey Radio Mix)	Idina Menzel	3:44
9.	"Popular Song"	Mika featuring Ariana Grande	3:19

== 15th anniversary special edition ==
The album was re-released on February 8, 2019, with four bonus tracks. These tracks were taken from live performances on the show A Very Wicked Halloween: Celebrating 15 Years On Broadway, which was broadcast by NBC on October 29, 2018.

This edition was released on CD, digitally, and on a Limited Exclusive Split Color Vinyl in green and black.

=== Track listing ===
All tracks are written by Stephen Schwartz.

No.	Title	Performer(s)	Length
1.	"For Good - Live"	Kristin Chenoweth; Idina Menzel	4:22
2.	"What Is This Feeling? - Live"	Pentatonix	3:37
3.	"The Wizard and I - Live"	Ariana Grande	3:55
4.	"As Long As You're Mine - Live"	Adam Lambert; Ledisi	3:47

== Reception ==
Professional ratings
Review scores
Source	Rating
AllMusic	3/5 stars
Entertainment Weekly	C+

The cast recording received mixed reviews from critics at the time, though later reviews reappraised the music positively. AllMusic rated the score three out of five stars, deeming it "tuneful and the lyrics often witty." They also noted that Chenoweth received the "Broadway belting material" and Menzel the "more adult contemporary-type ballads" and felt that this suited their respective characters. They concluded that the music was "craftsmanlike and certainly efficient for this somewhat questionable project." Writing for Entertainment Weekly, Lawrence Frascella gave the album a negative rating of C+, expressing that it was "fresh evidence that Broadway needs a new, galvanizing musical direction." Frascella lambasted the songs as "a dreary melange of Disney and Sondheim", though he praised the "lushly produced CD" and the performances of Chenoweth and Menzel. He commended the former's "effortless" glides "from ditzy-blonde comedy to thrilling operatic trill" and the latter's "clamorous and ear-piercing" voice that "cuts through the fog of show-tune cliche."

== Commercial performance ==
The cast recording initially debuted at number 125 on the US Billboard 200 in 2003 and reached number 66 in 2014, before peaking at number 33 in 2024 after the release of the film adaptation. The album was certified platinum on November 30, 2006, by the Recording Industry Association of America (RIAA). It was certified double platinum on November 8, 2010, and triple platinum on November 30, 2022. It has sold 2,670,000 copies in the United States as of January 2017.

== Singles ==
In 2007, Idina Menzel re-recorded "Defying Gravity" as a solo version and released it as a single for her third studio album I Stand (2008).

Julia Murney recorded "I'm Not That Girl" for her album I'm Not Waiting (2006). She recorded this particular song because she deemed it one song of the entire musical "that had nothing to do with flying or wizards".

Kerry Ellis recorded rock versions of the songs "Defying Gravity" and "I'm Not That Girl" for her album Wicked in Rock (2008), produced by Queen's guitarist, Brian May.

In 2012, Mika recorded a dance-pop version of "Popular Song", featuring Priscilla Renea, for his album The Origin of Love. He then recorded the same mix of the song with Ariana Grande, which was put out as a single and later featured on Grande's debut studio album Yours Truly (2013). Grande went on to play the role of Glinda in the 2024 film adaptation of the musical.

== Charts ==
=== Weekly charts ===
Weekly chart performance for Wicked
Chart (2003–2025)	Peak position
Austrian Albums (Ö3 Austria)	73
Dutch Vinyl Albums (GfK Dutch Charts)	32
German Albums (Offizielle Top 100)	67
Irish Compilation Albums (IRMA)	4
New Zealand Albums (RMNZ)	14
South Korean Albums (Gaon)	4
UK Compilation Albums (Official Charts)	5
UK Soundtrack Albums (Official Charts)	2
US Billboard 200	33
US Cast Albums (Billboard)	1

=== Year-end charts ===
Year-end chart performance for Wicked
Chart (2006)	Position
US Cast Albums (Billboard)	1
Chart (2007)	Position
US Cast Albums (Billboard)	1
Chart (2008)	Position
US Cast Albums (Billboard)	1
Chart (2009)	Position
US Cast Albums (Billboard)	1
Chart (2010)	Position
US Cast Albums (Billboard)	1
Chart (2011)	Position
US Cast Albums (Billboard)	2
Chart (2012)	Position
US Cast Albums (Billboard)	1
Chart (2013)	Position
US Cast Albums (Billboard)	1
Chart (2014)	Position
US Cast Albums (Billboard)	1
Chart (2015)	Position
US Cast Albums (Billboard)	2
Chart (2016)	Position
South Korean International Albums (Gaon)	15
US Cast Albums (Billboard)	2
Chart (2017)	Position
US Cast Albums (Billboard)	3
Chart (2018)	Position
US Cast Albums (Billboard)	3
Chart (2019)	Position
US Cast Albums (Billboard)	4
Chart (2020)	Position
US Cast Albums (Billboard)	2
Chart (2021)	Position
US Cast Albums (Billboard)	2
Chart (2022)	Position
US Cast Albums (Billboard)	5
Chart (2023)	Position
US Cast Albums (Billboard)	3
Chart (2024)	Position
US Cast Albums (Billboard)	1

== Certifications ==
Certifications for Wicked
Region	Certification	Certified units/sales
United States (RIAA)	4× Platinum	4,000,000^{‡}
^{‡} Sales+streaming figures based on certification alone.
