= Wicked: The Soundtrack =

2024 soundtrack album by Wicked cast, Cynthia Erivo and Ariana Grande

Soundtrack album by Wicked Movie Cast, Cynthia Erivo and Ariana Grande
- Released: November 22, 2024
- Recorded: 2023
- Studios: AIR (London, UK); Ozdustland Studio; Power Station (New York, New York)
- Length: 53:58
- Labels: Universal Studios; Republic; VLG; Verve
- Producers: Greg Wells; Stephen Schwartz; Stephen Oremus

Wicked chronology
Wicked (2003)	Wicked: The Soundtrack (2024)	Wicked: The Original Motion Picture Score (2024)

Cynthia Erivo chronology
Ch. 1 vs. 1 (2021)	Wicked: The Soundtrack (2024)	I Forgive You (2025)

Ariana Grande chronology
Eternal Sunshine (2024)	Wicked: The Soundtrack (2024)	Eternal Sunshine Deluxe: Brighter Days Ahead (2025)

Singles from Wicked: The Soundtrack
- 1. "Popular" Released: November 22, 2024; 2. "Defying Gravity" Released: December 3, 2024

Wicked: The Soundtrack is the soundtrack album to the 2024 film Wicked by Jon M. Chu, which is based on the first act of the stage musical by Stephen Schwartz and Winnie Holzman. It was released by Republic Records and Verve Records on November 22, 2024, the same date as the film's theatrical release in the United States. Along with the film cast, the soundtrack is billed to Cynthia Erivo and Ariana Grande, the film's two main stars, who each appear on seven tracks out of eleven on the standard release.

== Background ==
The soundtrack album comprises 11 songs from the film, with all songs from the first act of the original stage musical being included. Cynthia Erivo and Ariana Grande, who play Elphaba and Glinda, respectively, each appear on seven songs. The majority of the vocals were recorded live on set, rather than in a recording studio.

It was produced by Wicked composer Stephen Schwartz, Greg Wells, and Stephen Oremus, and was mixed by Wells. Wells also played, at Stephen Schwartz's request, all the drums, guitars, bass, and most of the keyboards. All songs were orchestrated by Jeff Atmajian. Mike Knobloch, President of Music and Publishing at NBCUniversal, stated that Schwartz, Wells, Oremus, and the production team wanted the album to be "a standalone and complete aural experience" from the film itself. He further stated:

The original cast recording is iconic, so priority number one was to not mess it up. It has also been a great opportunity to make a soundtrack for a beloved musical that will only be the second Wicked album in two decades. But while our primary mission was to make the film, we didn't want the soundtrack to simply be a 'copied and pasted' byproduct."

== Production ==
Work on the soundtrack began early in the film's pre-production process, as the musical numbers would largely drive production. The process began by developing the songs' instrumental tracks and recording demos in phases. The film employed a large orchestra, in contrast to the smaller pit orchestras used in Broadway productions. Schwartz stated, "There's this huge, magical world that Jon Chu has created and the music needed to have the size to occupy that world. . . .Songs needed to be adjusted based on the action we're seeing on the screen. In some cases, things were expanded."

Cast vocals were recorded throughout filming, which required the work of sound engineer Simon Hayes, who worked as a live sound mixer. Each actor was equipped with three microphones: one boom mic and two lavalier microphones. They were also fitted with in-ear monitors that would play the finished studio backing tracks or a live keyboard. When certain filming restrictions did not allow the actors to sing the entire piece live, their live performances were intercut with their pre-recorded studio vocals. Schwartz stated, "The way their voices sounded in the recording studio needed to match how they sounded when they were on a soundstage, and that was tricky. We had a strong technical team and we were very aware going in that we were going to mix and match."

Studio versions of the vocals were recorded as a back-up before they were recorded live. The soundtrack album uses the same vocals that are in the film, with some small exceptions, such as an Aaron Copland-esque part Schwartz wrote for "Defying Gravity" that is only on the album and not the film. Some of the differences are due to the fact that Schwartz felt he had more artistic license with the soundtrack album. In addition, the creative team decided against including pop covers of the songs, as was done with musical films like Frozen (Demi Lovato's "Let It Go") and The Greatest Showman (Kesha's "This Is Me"); Wells was also a producer on the soundtrack album for the latter.

=== Musical numbers ===
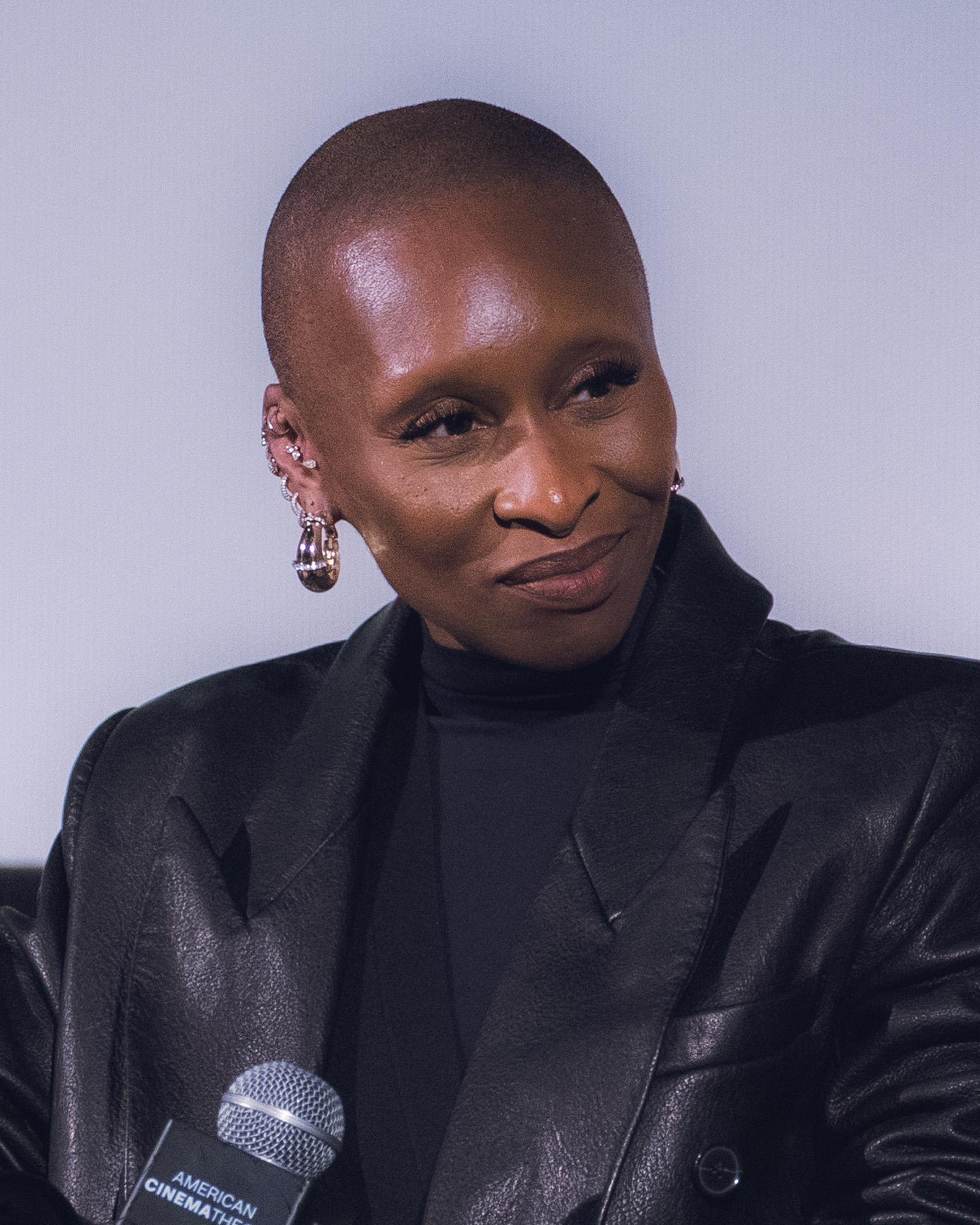
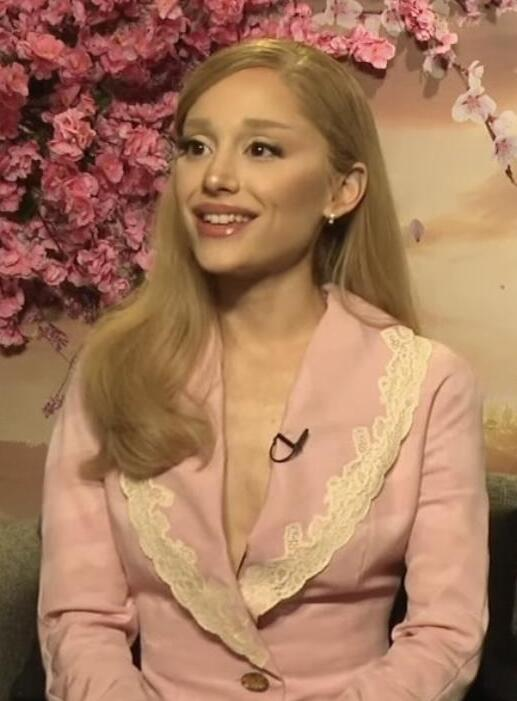
Cynthia Erivo (left) and Ariana Grande (right)

"Popular" was the first musical number shot for the film. Schwartz, Wells, and Oremus proposed modifying its rhythm from the stage musical version and "hip-hop[ping] it up a little bit", but Grande insisted that the song stay true to the original. Wells had previously produced "Popular Song" (2012) by Grande and Mika, which samples "Popular", and felt it could work as a proof of concept for a more hip-hop version. The song features an extended ending with additional key changes.

In the song "One Short Day", Schwartz wrote a new section "to show more of the propaganda that the Wizard was disseminating and really understand better this magic book — the Grimmerie". The new section was performed by Idina Menzel and Kristin Chenoweth, who originated the roles of Elphaba and Glinda on Broadway, respectively.

The "Defying Gravity" sequence was filmed about a year into production, having been delayed by the 2023 SAG-AFTRA strike. Erivo stated that she wanted the character's voice to grow throughout the song. When recording rehearsal tracks of the song, Erivo first sang the ending battle cry "by the book" before Schwartz encouraged her to try different variations. She stated, "I was always looking forward to that moment, just because everything builds to there. Your body and your brain and your mind – and your heart, really – are waiting to be able to release that one final note, because it's the ultimate moment where [Elphaba] can become herself."

"Ozdust Duet", a new orchestral track, is included as a bonus track on digital versions of the album. It combines elements from "Dancing Through Life" and "For Good", the latter of which appears in the second film.

== Release ==
The soundtrack album was released on November 22, 2024. In addition to digital download and streaming, it was also released on CD, LP, and picture disc. Exclusive variants of the CD and LP were released at Target and Barnes & Noble. Upon its release, soundtrack album listening parties were held at music stores throughout the United States from November 22 to 24, 2024.

Two weeks after the album's release, a version of the soundtrack was released that features radio edits of "Popular" and "Defying Gravity" as additional tracks. A sing-along edition of the album was released on December 20, 2024. It features the original album's 11 tracks without lead vocals, but keeps the ensemble's vocals and some of the dialogue parts intact. On April 4, 2025, a new version of the album was released featuring commentary on all songs by the film's cast and crew.

=== Singles ===
On November 21, 2024, Hits Daily Double reported that "Popular" and "Defying Gravity" were expected to be released as singles. "Popular" made its radio debut in the United States on November 22, 2024, the same date as the film and soundtrack's release, as the album's mainstream radio single. "Defying Gravity", the second single, was released to US contemporary hit radio stations on December 3. In Italy, the two songs were released as radio singles "Popular" on December 13. Both singles have become radio hits in the U.S., charting on the Adult Pop Airplay and Pop Airplay radio charts.

== Commercial performance ==
Wicked: The Soundtrack became the most-streamed musical soundtrack on Amazon Music within the first 24 hours of its release. Within the first three days of its release, "Defying Gravity" had been streamed on Spotify 4.9 million times; "Popular" followed suit with 4.6 million streams.

In the US, the album debuted at number 2 on the Billboard 200 with 139,000 album-equivalent units, and topped the Top Album Sales chart with 85,000 sales. It marks the highest debut for a soundtrack of a musical stage-to-film adaptation. In addition, the album topped the Top Soundtracks and Vinyl Albums charts. In the same week, seven of its songs charted on the Billboard Hot 100: "Defying Gravity" at number 44, "Popular" at number 53, "What Is This Feeling?" at number 68, "No One Mourns the Wicked" at number 86, "Dancing Through Life" at number 90, "The Wizard and I" at number 93, and "I'm Not That Girl" at number 94. The album has spent its first six weeks in the top ten of the Billboard 200, earned a total of 506,000 album-equivalent units.

On the British charts, the album debuted at number 1 on the compilations chart, album downloads chart, and soundtrack albums chart. It was biggest debut week for a musical soundtrack in the 2020s, and earned the largest weekly vinyl sales for a musical soundtrack in the 21st century. On the British singles chart, "Defying Gravity" debuted at number 7, "Popular" debuted at number 13, and "What Is This Feeling?" debuted at number 17.

On the Australian charts, the soundtrack debuted at number 3 on the albums chart, while "Defying Gravity" debuted at number 42 on the singles chart.

== Critical reception ==
Professional ratings
Review scores
Source	Rating
AllMusic	3.5/5 stars
The Daily Telegraph	4/5 stars

The soundtrack received praise from critics, with Variety's Chris Willman writing that "the album puts a further exclamation point on Schwartz's rare brilliance as both melodist and lyricist, a la [Stephen] Sondheim". In addition to commending the vocal performances of Erivo and Grande, Billboard's Stephen Daw praised the updated "poppy" orchestration and vocals provided by Jonathan Bailey in "Dancing Through Life", noting that it is a particular improvement from its original Broadway cast recording counterpart. The album was included in Billboard Philippines's list of the 50 best albums and EPs of 2024.

== Accolades ==
Wicked: The Soundtrack awards and nominations
Award	Year (Note: Indicates the year of ceremony. Each year is linked to the article about the awards held that year, wherever possible.)	Category	Result	Ref.
American Music Awards	2025	Favorite Soundtrack	Nominated	
Black Reel Awards	2025	Outstanding Soundtrack	Won	
iHeartRadio Music Awards	2025	Favorite Soundtrack	Won	
NAACP Image Awards	2025	Outstanding Soundtrack/Compilation Album	Won	
Nickelodeon Kids' Choice Awards	2025	Favorite Album	Nominated	
Grammy Awards	2026	Best Compilation Soundtrack for Visual Media	Nominated	

== Track listing ==
All tracks are written by Stephen Schwartz.

Wicked: The Soundtrack standard edition track listing
No.	Title	Performer(s)	Length
1.	"No One Mourns the Wicked"	Ariana Grande featuring Andy Nyman, Courtney-Mae Briggs, Jeff Goldblum, Sharon D. Clarke and Jenna Boyd	7:27
2.	"Dear Old Shiz"	Shiz University Choir featuring Ariana Grande	1:11
3.	"The Wizard and I"	Cynthia Erivo featuring Michelle Yeoh	5:36
4.	"What Is This Feeling?"	Ariana Grande and Cynthia Erivo	3:48
5.	"Something Bad"	Peter Dinklage featuring Cynthia Erivo	1:48
6.	"Dancing Through Life"	Jonathan Bailey featuring Ariana Grande, Ethan Slater, Marissa Bode and Cynthia Erivo	9:47
7.	"Popular"	Ariana Grande	4:01
8.	"I'm Not That Girl"	Cynthia Erivo	3:57
9.	"One Short Day"	Cynthia Erivo, Ariana Grande, Kristin Chenoweth and Idina Menzel featuring Michael McCorry Rose	6:32
10.	"A Sentimental Man"	Jeff Goldblum	2:12
11.	"Defying Gravity"	Cynthia Erivo featuring Ariana Grande	7:39
Total length:			53:58

Digital and Record Store Day vinyl edition bonus track
No.	Title	Performer(s)	Length
12.	"Ozdust Duet"	The Wicked Orchestra	2:11
Total length:			56:18

Digital reissue and Japanese CD edition bonus tracks
No.	Title	Performer(s)	Length
13.	"Popular" (radio edit)	Ariana Grande	2:53
14.	"Defying Gravity" (radio edit)	Cynthia Erivo featuring Ariana Grande	3:33
Total length:			62:44

Notes

- Commentary by Schwartz is included as an additional track on the Apple Music edition of the album.

== Personnel ==
All music is composed by Stephen Schwartz.

- Stephen Schwartz – producer
- Greg Wells – producer, mixer, arranger, keyboards, guitars, bass, drums, synth programming
- Stephen Oremus – producer, arranger, conductor
- Jon M. Chu – executive album producer
- Marc Platt – executive album producer
- Maggie Rodford – music supervisor
- Robin Baynton – supervising vocal editor and engineer
- Dominick Amendum – production music supervisor, arranger, keyboards
- Ariana Grande – vocal producer
- Cynthia Erivo – vocal producer
- Laurence Anslow – additional mixing
- Jack Dolman – supervising music editor
- Catherine Wilson – supervising music editor
- Benjamin Holder – music associate
- Jeff Atmajian – arranger, orchestrator
- Nick Wollage – recording engineer, orchestral mixer
- Ian Kagey – choir recording engineer
- John Prestage – recordist
- Jason Soudah – assistant song engineer
- Laura Beck – assistant engineer
- Wil Jones – assistant engineer
- George Lloyd-Owen – assistant engineer
- Eve Morris – assistant engineer
- Sean Phelan – assistant engineer
- Jonathan Beard – additional orchestration
- Ed Trybeck – additional orchestration
- Henri Wilkinson – additional orchestration
- Ashley Andrew-Jones – orchestra editing
- Douglas Romayne – orchestration mockups
- Kevin Kliesch – orchestration mockups
- Jordan Cox – lead music preparation
- Global Music Service – music preparation
- Aiden Davis – music preparation
- James Reagan – music preparation
- Brad Ritchie – music preparation
- Jill Streater – librarian
- Bronwen Chan – music assistant
- Millie Davies – music production assistant
- Sarah Burrell – music trainee
- Wai Yi Wong – music trainee
- Lucy Evans – assistant to music supervisor
- John Angier – music assistant to Mr. Schwartz
- Aaron Kenny – music assistant to Mr. Schwartz
- Michael Cole – assistant to Mr. Schwartz
- Rory Calvert – AIR Studios crew
- Katy Jackson – AIR Studios crew
- Charlotte Matthews – AIR Studios crew
- Glen Mexted – AIR Studios crew
- Debby Waldron – AIR Studios crew
- Michael Hickey – Power Station crew
- Hayley Isaacson – Power Station crew
- Henry Reinach – Power Station crew
- Beth Scott – Power Station crew

=== Musicians ===
- Jeremy Isaac – orchestra leader
- Richard George – violin
- Fenella Barton – violin
- Mark Berrow – violin
- Daniel Bhattacharya – violin
- Natalia Bonner – violin
- Thomas Bowes – violin
- Charlie Brown – violin
- Ben Buckton – violin
- Emil Chakalov – violin
- Ralph de Souza – violin
- Christina Emanuel – violin
- Dai Emanuel – violin
- Jonathan Evans-Jones – violin
- Nina Foster – violin
- Kathy Gowers – violin
- Raja Halder – violin
- Marianne Haynes – violin
- Philippe Honoré – violin
- Ian Humphries – violin
- Martyn Jackson – violin
- Patrick Kiernan – violin
- Bea Lovejoy – violin
- Dorina Markoff – violin
- Laura Melhuish – violin
- John Mills – violin
- Steve Morris – violin
- Everton Nelson – violin
- Odile Ollagnon – violin
- Oscar Perks – violin
- Tom Pigott-Smith – violin
- Kotono Sato – violin
- Sarah Sexton – violin
- Anna Szabo – violin
- Cathy Thompson – violin
- Clare Thompson – violin
- Michael Trainor – violin
- Matthew Ward – violin
- Debbie Widdup – violin
- Warren Zielinski – violin
- Bruce White – viola
- Laurie Anderson – viola
- Nick Barr – viola
- Catherine Bradshaw – viola
- Reiad Chibah – viola
- Sue Dench – viola
- Clive Howard – viola
- Martin Humbey – viola
- Helen Kamminga – viola
- Peter Lale – viola
- Fiona Leggat – viola
- Lydia Lowndes-Northcott – viola
- Kate Musker – viola
- Andrew Parker – viola
- Bruce White – viola
- Nick Cooper – cello
- Adrian Bradbury – cello
- Tim Gill – cello
- Sophie Harris – cello
- Paul Kegg – cello
- David Lale – cello
- Rachael Lander – cello
- Vicky Matthews – cello
- Frank Schaefer – cello
- Bozidar Vukotic – cello
- Bruce White – cello
- Tony Woollard – cello
- Mary Scully – double bass
- Steve Mair – double bass
- Paul Kimber – double bass
- Roger Linley – double bass
- Rupert Ring – double bass
- Steve Rossell – double bass
- Ben Russell – double bass
- Lucy Shaw – double bass
- Beth Symmons – double bass
- Laurence Ungless – double bass
- Dominic Worsley – double bass
- Karen Jones – flute
- David Cuthbert – flute
- Helen Keen – flute
- Eliza Marshall – flute
- Tim Rundle – oboe
- Janey Miller – oboe
- Sue Bohling – oboe
- John Anderson – oboe
- John Carnac – clarinet
- Duncan Ashby – clarinet
- Anthony Pike – clarinet
- Nicholas Rodwell – clarinet
- Gavin McNaughton – bassoon
- Emma Harding – bassoon
- Rachel Simms – bassoon
- Simon Chiswell – bassoon
- Richard Watkins – French horn
- Nigel Black – French horn
- Diego Incertis – French horn
- Corinne Bailey – French horn
- Phillippa Koush-Jalali – French horn
- Henry Ward – French horn
- Alexei Watkins – French horn
- Paul Booth – saxophone
- Sam Mayne – saxophone
- Nick Moss – saxophone
- Colin Skinner – saxophone
- Jamie Talbot – saxophone
- Philip Cobb – trumpet
- Patrick White – trumpet
- Daniel Newell – trumpet
- Christian Barraclough – trumpet
- Kate Moore – trumpet
- Gareth Small – trumpet
- Andy Wood – trombone
- Ed Tarrant – trombone
- Barry Clements – trombone
- Chris Augustine – trombone
- Jon Stokes – trombone
- Phil White – trombone
- Owen Slade – tuba, cimbasso
- Frank Ricotti – percussion
- Julian Poole – percussion
- Gary Kettel – percussion
- Chris Baron – timpani
- Simon Chamberlain – piano
- Bryn Lewis – harp
- Hugh Webb – harp

=== Vocalists ===
- Wendi Bergamini
- Larkin Bogan
- Ashley Brown
- Michael Cole
- Meg Doherty
- Danny Drewes
- Alyssa Fox
- Caitlyn Gallogly
- Julie Garnyé
- Troy Iwata
- Jesse JP Johnson
- Kristoffer Cusick
- Pablo David Laucerica
- Ross Lekites
- Kara Lindsay
- Michael McCorry Rose
- Desi Oakley
- Allsun O'Malley
- Jarnéia Richard-Noel
- Marissa Rosen
- Michael Seelbach
- Shayna Steele
- Nikki Renee Daniels
- Nicholas Ward
- Derrick Williams
- Max Chambers
- Scarlett Diviney
- Austin Elle Fisher
- Annika Reese Franklin
- Jackson Hayes
- Spencer Lincoln
- Theo Lowenstein
- Skylar Bohon Oremus
- Nora Winer
- Isabella Ye

== Charts ==
=== Weekly charts ===
Weekly chart performance for Wicked: The Soundtrack
Chart (2024–2025)	Peak position
Argentine Albums (CAPIF)	10
Australian Albums (ARIA)	3
Austrian Albums (Ö3 Austria)	6
Belgian Albums (Ultratop Flanders)	6
Belgian Albums (Ultratop Wallonia)	30
Canadian Albums (Billboard)	9
Dutch Albums (Album Top 100)	8
French Albums (SNEP)	38
German Albums (Offizielle Top 100)	16
Greek Albums (IFPI)	3
Icelandic Albums (Tónlistinn)	27
Irish Compilation Albums (IRMA)	1
Italian Albums (FIMI)	42
Japanese Albums (Oricon)	37
Japanese Combined Albums (Oricon)	30
Japanese Hot Albums (Billboard Japan)	30
New Zealand Albums (RMNZ)	3
Norwegian Albums (VG-lista)	26
Polish Albums (ZPAV)	69
Spanish Albums (PROMUSICAE)	6
Swedish Albums (Sverigetopplistan)	37
Swiss Albums (Schweizer Hitparade)	29
UK Compilation Albums (Official Charts)	1
UK Soundtrack Albums (Official Charts)	1
US Billboard 200	2
US Soundtrack Albums (Billboard)	1

=== Year-end charts ===
Year-end chart performance for Wicked: The Soundtrack
Chart (2025)	Position
Australian Albums (ARIA)	49
Belgian Albums (Ultratop Flanders)	90
Japanese Download Albums (Billboard Japan)	50
New Zealand Albums (RMNZ)	42
US Billboard 200	49
US Soundtrack Albums (Billboard)	2

== Certifications ==
Certifications and sales for Wicked: The Soundtrack
Region	Certification	Certified units/sales
New Zealand (RMNZ)	Gold	7,500^{‡}
United Kingdom (BPI)	Gold	100,000^{‡}
United States (RIAA)	Platinum	1,000,000^{‡}
^{‡} Sales+streaming figures based on certification alone.

== Release history ==
Release history and formats for Wicked: The Soundtrack
Region	Date	Format(s)	Editions(s)	Label(s)	Ref.
Various	November 22, 2024	Digital download; streaming; CD; LP; picture disc	Standard	Republic; Verve	
Various	December 6, 2024	CD; LP	Fan edition	Republic; Verve	
Various	December 20, 2024	Digital download; streaming	Sing-along	Republic; Verve	
Japan	March 5, 2025	CD	Japan Edition	Universal Music Japan	
Various	April 4, 2025	Digital download; streaming	Commentary	Republic; Verve	
United States	April 12, 2025	LP	Record Store Day edition	Republic; Verve	
