= As Long as You're Mine =

2003 song composed by Stephen Schwartz

Song by Idina Menzel and Norbert Leo Butz

from the album Wicked
- Released: December 16, 2003
- Genre: Show tunes
- Length: 3:48
- Label: Decca Broadway
- Songwriter: Stephen Schwartz

"As Long as You're Mine" is a song from the second act of the musical Wicked (2003) by Stephen Schwartz. It is a duet between Elphaba, the Wicked Witch of the West, and Fiyero, with whom she is in love. It was originally performed by Idina Menzel and Norbert Leo Butz, who played the roles of Elphaba and Fiyero, respectively, in the original Broadway cast.

== Context ==
The song is sung in the second act of the musical. In the duet, as Elphaba and Fiyero are on the run from the Wizard's forces, the two express their newly discovered love for each other. At the end of the song, Elphaba confesses that she feels "Wicked" for the first time. This is a play on the moniker she has been given, and the British slang term wicked, a reference to the fact that Fiyero has been romantically involved with Elphaba's closest friend, Glinda. It also reflects Elphaba's first move into the world of romance, in contrast to the feelings she expressed in "I'm Not That Girl". Before her romantic encounter with Fiyero can continue, however, Elphaba senses her sister Nessarose, the Wicked Witch of the East, is in danger and runs to her aid.

== Composition ==
The basic tune was originally written by Stephen Schwartz in the early 1970s. He used it in Wicked as the opening theme, and the basis for the only love duet in the musical. For this reason, he wanted the score to be sensual and passionate, but also aggressive and "dark". The song begins with the first notes of "No One Mourns the Wicked"; however, played on the piano and with electric bass with a faster rhythm, the same chord progression becomes the basis for a romantic duet.

== Cynthia Erivo and Jonathan Bailey version ==
"As Long as You're Mine"

Song by Cynthia Erivo and Jonathan Bailey

from the album Wicked: For Good – The Soundtrack
- Released: November 21, 2025
- Genre: Show tune
- Length: 4:06
- Label: Republic; Verve
- Songwriter: Stephen Schwartz
- Producers: Greg Wells; Stephen Oremus; Stephen Schwartz

Lyric video
- "As Long as You're Mine" on YouTube

English actress Cynthia Erivo and fellow English actor Jonathan Bailey performed a rendition of "As Long as You're Mine" as Elphaba and Fiyero respectively in Wicked: For Good (2025), the second part of Universal Pictures' two-part film adaptation of Wicked, which was released on November 21, 2025. Their version of the song was released on the same day as part of the soundtrack album Wicked: For Good – The Soundtrack (2025) by Republic Records and Verve Records.

=== Charts ===
Chart performance for "As Long as You're Mine"
Chart (2025)	Peak position
New Zealand Hot Singles (RMNZ)	10
UK Singles (Official Charts)	29
US Billboard Hot 100	91

== Other versions ==
Eden Espinosa recorded a version with David Burnham for his self-titled album in 2007.

Lee Mead performed an all-male version with fellow "Any Dream Will Do" alumni Daniel Boys at Boys' cabaret event in August 2014, having also recorded a version with Rachel Tucker for his 10th anniversary album in February 2014.

Willemijn Verkaik and Kevin Tarte recorded a version of the track for Tarte's 2014 album "Reflection". For the musical's fifteenth anniversary special for NBC, A Very Wicked Halloween, Ledisi and Adam Lambert performed the song.

For Playbill's Pride in Times Square event in June 2024, recent Broadway Elphabas Talia Suskauer and Lissa deGuzman sang the song together.

During Ben Platt's residency reopening the Palace Theatre on Broadway, he performed the song with former Broadway Elphaba Shoshana Bean as a special guest.

A barbershop quartet, Quorum, performed a cover of this song in the 2019 International Quartet Convention.

== Critical reaction ==
Entertainment Weekly's Maureen Lee Lenker considers the song a fan favorite. Stan Friedman of NewYorkTheatreGuide.com thought the song contained "strains" of Pippin, while Time's Richard Zoglin felt that all the songs were "Unmemorable".
