= "I Want" song =

Type of song

An "I Want" song, also called an "I Wish" song, is a popular type of song featured in musical films and shows. It has particularly become a popular term through its use to describe a series of songs featured in Disney Renaissance films in which main characters sing about their dissatisfaction with their current lives and what they're searching for. The term "'I Want' song" is believed to have been coined by Lehman Engel.

== Definition and purpose ==
Composer Stephen Schwartz explained that while an "I Want" song had no formula, he found that "pretty much any successful musical you can name has an 'I Want' song for its main character within the first fifteen or so minutes" in order to firmly, musically establish their desires and/or objectives in anticipation of the ensuing plot. In regards to the 1995 Disney film Pocahontas, Schwartz stated:

"Just Around the Riverbend" may not be a classic "I want" song, because the character doesn't really want anything that strongly until she meets John Smith, but it sets up her sense that she has another destiny to pursue than the one laid out for her by her father and society and her desire to go after it. The third number, "Mine Mine Mine", was basically supposed to introduce the antagonist, Ratcliffe, and what he wanted, so that the central dramatic conflict could be established.

Schwartz also notes "I Want" songs are usually those which have a life beyond the production they were featured in:

I don't think it's surprising that "I Want" songs tend to be among the most recorded – they are often somewhat more liftable than other songs in the show (that is, they make sense outside the framework of the show) and they give the singer something to act. In classic terms, the job of an "I Want" song is not to move the action forward, but to set up the desire of the leading character that will drive the action for the rest of the show.

Similarly, John Kenrick, a college professor of musical history and the author of the encyclopedia website Musicals 101, explained that "I Want" songs usually happen early in the first act, during which the main character(s) sing about a particular motivation that then sets up the narrative trajectory for the show to follow. Often, an "I Want" song—which can also take the form of "I Wish" or "I've Got To"—will have a reprise.

Bob Fosse said there were only three types of show songs from a director's point of view: "I Am" songs that explain a character/situation, "I Want" songs that supply desire and motivations, and "New songs" that don't fit the other categories.

== Examples ==
On Musicals 101, Kenrick listed historical examples of "I Want" songs including My Fair Lady's "Wouldn't It Be Loverly", The Little Mermaid's "Part of Your World", The Book of Mormon's "You and Me (But Mostly Me)", The Sound of Music's "I Have Confidence", Wicked's "The Wizard and I", Hamilton's "My Shot", "Wait for It", and "The Room Where It Happens", Carnival's "Mira", The Producers' "I Want to Be a Producer", and Dear Evan Hansen's "Waving Through a Window." Earlier examples include "Over the Rainbow" from The Wizard of Oz and "It Might as Well Be Spring" from State Fair. Kenrick also pointed out that Stephen Sondheim and James Lapine's 1986 Broadway musical, Into the Woods, begins and ends with a character stating "I wish."

Schwartz has also written "I Want" songs for live action musicals, including "Corner of the Sky" for Pippin and "The Wizard and I" for Wicked.

=== Disney ===
The Walt Disney Company has a long tradition of "I Want" songs in Disney animated musicals dating back to the Disney Renaissance era due to Alan Menken and Howard Ashman's work with the company; the term has retroactively been used to describe these older "I Want" songs. In a top ten list of Disney, The Daily Dot ranked Robin Hood's "Not in Nottingham" as the best "I Want" song. The site also noted that these could be sung by antagonists, ranking The Hunchback of Notre Dame's "Hellfire" at number 5. Both FanPop and Vulture Magazine listed "Part of Your World" from The Little Mermaid as the best song of this type. Meanwhile, the WFPL listed "Belle", "Somewhere That's Green" from Little Shop of Horrors, "Wouldn't It Be Loverly", "Lonely Room", "Corner of the Sky" from Pippin, and "Part of Your World" as great "I Want" songs. Examples of recent "I Want" songs include "Fabulous" and "I Want It All" from High School Musical.

== Works cited ==
- Laird, Paul R. (June 24, 2011). Wicked: A Musical Biography. Scarecrow Press. ISBN 978-0-8108-7752-8. OCLC 696321876.
