= Popular (Wicked song) =

2003 musical song

Song by Kristin Chenoweth

from the album Wicked
- Released: December 16, 2003
- Recorded: November 10, 2003
- Genre: Show tune
- Label: Decca Broadway
- Songwriter: Stephen Schwartz

"Popular" is a song from the musical Wicked, composed by Stephen Schwartz. It was originally recorded on November 10, 2003, by American actress Kristin Chenoweth, who portrayed Glinda in the musical. The song was released as part of the accompanying cast recording on December 16, 2003. The song is about Glinda trying to help her roommate Elphaba become more popular. American singer and actress Ariana Grande performed a version of "Popular" for the 2024 film adaptation of the musical, which was released as a single.

== Composition ==
The song is "meant to be as shallow as possible. And I think that's why people enjoy it, because it's real funny in that way. But it's also political. Glinda refers to the fact that politicians and heads of state get by not because they're particularly smart, but because people like to hang out with them."

— Stephen Schwartz talking about "Popular"

"Popular" was written by the composer Stephen Schwartz for the first act of the 2003 musical Wicked. It is sung by the character Glinda and is considered the character's definitive song, while also including brief dialogue interludes by Elphaba. While writing the song, Schwartz imagined one of "those cheerleaders" — "She was the most popular girl at school, and she always went out with the captain of the football team. She was always the homecoming queen, blonde with a perky nose – the whole thing." Schwartz has compared the song to the plot of the film Clueless.

In "Popular", Glinda attempts to get Elphaba, the future Wicked Witch of the West, to conform to the accepted ideas of beauty and popularity as a means of establishing their newfound friendship. Schwartz described the lyrics as "empty calories" and shallow. The composition of the song is a more bubblegum sound than the rest of the musical, with Beatles influences. Glinda also yodels on the word "popular" because Schwartz was thinking of Oklahoman Kristin Chenoweth, who originated the role of Glinda, while writing the song.

== Reception and legacy ==
Laura Reineke of the blog Vulture ranked "Popular" as the second-best song from Wicked, calling it "bubbly and refreshingly self-aware" and praising it for showcasing Kristin Chenoweth's singing and comedic talent.

"Popular" was sampled in "Popular Song" by English singer Mika featuring American singer Ariana Grande (who would later portray Glinda in the 2024 film adaptation) from their albums The Origin of Love (2012) and Yours Truly (2013), respectively. It was also sampled by the producer Pheelz in his song "Popular" which features the artiste Vector for his "#A7" audio - visual album.

On July 31, 2013, Kristin Chenoweth performed a lyrically modified version of "Popular" on The Tonight Show with Jay Leno, about New York politician Anthony Weiner. In it, she tells Weiner how to be "the right kind of popular," and also his wife to "take a page from Hillary and become independent of her hubby, while [Weiner sports] a chat room chubby". Some of the original lyrics are also present.

In late 2014, Chenoweth included a multilingual version of the song in her live album Coming Home. This new rendition includes lyrics from the Japanese and German versions of the song. In 2015, the song was covered in the sixth season of the TV series Glee. It was sung by Lea Michele and Chris Colfer as Rachel Berry and Kurt Hummel in the episode "2009". Satirical singer Randy Rainbow made a version called "Unpopular", critical of the President of the United States, Donald Trump.

== Certifications ==
Certifications for "Popular" by Kristin Chenoweth
Region	Certification	Certified units/sales
United Kingdom (BPI)	Silver	200,000^{‡}
^{‡} Sales+streaming figures based on certification alone.

== Ariana Grande version ==
"Popular"

Single by Ariana Grande

from the album Wicked: The Soundtrack
- B-side: "Popular (sing-along)"
- Released: November 22, 2024
- Recorded: 2023
- Studio: AIR Studios (London, England); Power Station (New York, NY)
- Genre: Show tune
- Length: 4:01; 2:53 (edit)
- Label: Republic; Verve
- Songwriter: Stephen Schwartz
- Producers: Greg Wells; Stephen Oremus; Stephen Schwartz

Ariana Grande singles chronology
"The Boy Is Mine" (2024)	"Popular" (2024)	"Defying Gravity" (2024)

Audio video
- "Popular" on YouTube

American singer and actress Ariana Grande performed a rendition of "Popular" as Glinda in the first part of Universal Pictures' two-part film adaptation of Wicked, which was released on November 22, 2024. Her version of the song was released the same day on the soundtrack album Wicked: The Soundtrack (2024). It was sent to US radio stations on November 26 by Republic and Verve Records as the lead single from the soundtrack.

=== Composition ===
For the film version, Stephen Schwartz, music producer Greg Wells, and musical supervisor Stephen Oremus wanted to modify the rhythm of the song from the stage musical version. Schwartz confessed that "In the spirit of being open to new things for the movie, my music team and I thought, let's refresh the rhythm. Let's, maybe, I don’t know, hip-hop it up a little bit." However, Grande resisted and said that she wanted to "be Glinda, not Ariana Grande playing Glinda." She insisted that the song stay true to the original and that all changes to the song felt like they came from Glinda's motivations and not her own vocal stylings. According to Schwartz, Grande added "little inventive things within it, but I think they are strongly character-based." The song's climax was also extended with additional key changes and vocal extensions as part of the expansion of the film's plot, while also to showcase the range of Grande's talents. Though initially hesitant about performing the extended ending, after Schwartz explained to her how it matched Glinda's behavior, especially visually on-screen, Grande was convinced and went along with the change "wholeheartedly."

=== Filming ===
"Popular" was the first song shot for the film, and posed the challenge of creating a "huge, grand number" in the smallest set of a dorm room. Cinematographer Alice Brooks came up with the idea of "Popular" being one long sunrise as opposed to "Defying Gravity" being a sunset, leading to the addition of a skylight in the dorm's dome ceiling to allow the sun to be the spotlight. For the sequence, costume designer Paul Tazewell created an outfit for Glinda that was a "pink, dotted peignoir with spiraling circles out of ruffles" to reflect the playful and frivolous vibe of the song. For the extended ending of the song, Grande freestyled a set of dance movements in a long hallway set, including a new high kick.

=== Critical reception ===
Writing for Billboard, Stephen Daw named "Popular" the third-best song of the soundtrack album and expressed that Grande put all concerns to rest about whether her version would live up to Chenoweth's original. Daw praised the song as "campy", "hilarious", "technically impressive" due to "Grande's killer voice". He also lauded Grande's "comedy chops" for giving Glinda the "outsized vapidity" required for the song and the "stratospheric key-changes" at the end that contributed to its maximalist feel. Similarly, The Daily Telegraph noted that Grande made the song her own while paying homage to Chenoweth's performance and asserted that the song alone "proves that Grande was born to play Glinda".

=== Accolades ===
Awards and nominations for "Popular" by Ariana Grande
Organization	Year	Category	Result	Ref.
Online Film & Television Association	2024	Best Adapted Song	Nominated	
Nickelodeon Kids' Choice Awards	2025	Favorite Song from a Movie	Nominated	

=== Charts ===
Chart performance for "Popular" by Ariana Grande
Chart (2024–2025)	Peak position
Australia (ARIA)	52
Canada Hot 100 (Billboard)	77
Global 200 (Billboard)	54
Ireland (IRMA)	26
Japan Hot Overseas (Billboard Japan)	10
New Zealand Hot Singles (RMNZ)	8
Philippines (Philippines Hot 100)	46
South Korea Download (Circle)	93
UK Singles (Official Charts)	13
US Billboard Hot 100	53
US Adult Pop Airplay (Billboard)	27
US Pop Airplay (Billboard)	26

=== Certifications ===
Certifications for "Popular" by Ariana Grande
Region	Certification	Certified units/sales
Brazil (Pro-Música Brasil)	Platinum	40,000^{‡}
United Kingdom (BPI)	Silver	200,000^{‡}
^{‡} Sales+streaming figures based on certification alone.

=== Release history ===
Release dates and formats for "Popular" by Ariana Grande
Region	Date	Format	Label(s)	Ref.
United States	November 26, 2024	Contemporary hit radio; hot adult contemporary radio	Republic; Verve	
Italy	December 13, 2024	Radio airplay	Universal	
Various	March 21, 2025	7-inch vinyl	Republic	

== See also ==
- Socialite
- Social capital
- Cultural capital
