= No Good Deed (song) =

2003 song by Stephen Schwartz

Song by Idina Menzel

from the album Wicked
- Released: December 16, 2003
- Recorded: November 10, 2003
- Genre: Show tune
- Length: 3:30
- Label: Decca Broadway
- Songwriter: Stephen Schwartz

"No Good Deed" is a musical number from the 2003 Broadway musical Wicked. It is sung by Elphaba, the main character of the show. It is also included in the second installment of Universal Pictures' two-part musical film adaptation, Wicked: For Good (2025).

== Context and analysis ==
Performed towards the end of Act Two, the song springs from Elphaba's rage over her continuously thwarted efforts to do good and her inner turmoil about her intention for doing so. It explores the ideas of goodness and wickedness that are central to the musical's theme. "No Good Deed" is sung while Elphaba believes Glinda has used her sister's death to lure Elphaba into being captured by the Wizard's Guard. Elphaba is distraught at being vilified by the Wizard's propaganda and the hatred of the citizens of Oz, so she decides she will no longer attempt to do good.

In the song, Elphaba lists what she perceives as her failures at goodness, including anger with herself over her love interest Fiyero, who is being tortured by the Wizard's guards in hopes he will reveal her whereabouts; the capture and incapacitation of her favorite teacher, Dr. Dillamond; and the death of her sister, Nessarose. It begins with Elphaba screaming "Fiyero," but instead of an unhitched scream, she sings a high note that is a minor second above the tonal centre of the song. This creates the effect of a scream, as the note is very high and dissonant, but is much more controlled and musical than an actual scream. It then moves into a chant of magical words making it the most chilling and foreboding of all the musical's numbers.

Schwartz has likened "No Good Deed" to an opera aria:

"It’s just written for a different voice type, and it’s not written to be sung amplified. So those are the two big differences. I mean, 'No Good Deed' is written for a belter—I suppose a mezzo-soprano could sing it. But the orchestra is so busy and obstreperous throughout that you have to have an amplified voice to carry over it, if you want to hear the words at all. But for instance there's a moment in 'No Good Deed' where she belts a big note and then there's a place where it suddenly gets pianissimo — she has to hit the note very loud and hold it, and then get very soft — and that's absolutely like something one would write in classical singing or an opera aria. Or the moment where she does 'Nessa, Dr. Dillamond,' and then sort of shouts out 'Fiyero' while the orchestra is sawing away at one of the motifs. I think it's structured very much like an aria but it's built to get a great big hand at the end with a big belted last note. So it's still very much musical theatre."

== Development ==
Originally, it was sung by actress Idina Menzel, who is known for, as Ben Brantley of the New York Times describes it, her "iron strong larynx". Stephen Schwartz composed it specifically to showcase Menzel's belting talent, in addition to giving her a second-act solo song. Idina Menzel has been quoted as saying that this song was her favorite to sing in the show as it "reminded her of her Bat Mitzvah."

== Cynthia Erivo version ==
"No Good Deed"

Song by Cynthia Erivo

from the album Wicked: For Good – The Soundtrack
- Released: November 21, 2025
- Genre: Show tune
- Length: 3:50
- Label: Republic; Verve
- Songwriter: Stephen Schwartz
- Producers: Greg Wells; Stephen Oremus; Stephen Schwartz

Lyric video
- "No Good Deed" on YouTube

English actress Cynthia Erivo performed "No Good Deed" as Elphaba in Wicked: For Good (2025), the second instalment in Universal Pictures' two-part film adaptation of Wicked, which was released on November 21, 2025. Her version of the song was released on the same day as part of the soundtrack album Wicked: For Good – The Soundtrack (2025) by Republic Records and Verve Label Group. One week prior to the film's release, a video was released featuring Erivo performing a "reimagined" version of the song while Misty Copeland dances to it.

=== Charts ===
Chart performance for "No Good Deed"
Chart (2025)	Peak position
Australia (ARIA)	81
Canada Hot 100 (Billboard)	85
Global 200 (Billboard)	95
Ireland (IRMA)	32
Netherlands (Single Tip)	17
New Zealand Hot Singles (RMNZ)	8
UK Singles (Official Charts)	17
US Billboard Hot 100	56

== Other recordings ==
The song, along with the rest of the musical, was translated into eight languages. Among these, the German version, sung by Dutch actress Willemijn Verkaik, was featured on the 5th and 10th Anniversary Wicked albums. In Willemijn's 10-year career in the show, she performed this song in three languages - German, Dutch, and English. In an interview, she said that for German and Dutch, this song was the hardest to sing in the musical, while this was not the case in English. Instead, the hardest for her was "The Wizard and I" in the English-language productions.
