= Wicked: One Wonderful Night =

2025 American television musical special

- Promotional poster
- Also known as: Wicked: Event Special
- Genre: Music
- Written by: Lawrence Dai; Nedaa Sweiss; Ben Winston
- Directed by: Paul Dugdale
- Starring: Cynthia Erivo; Ariana Grande; Ethan Slater; Bowen Yang; Marissa Bode; Michelle Yeoh; Jeff Goldblum
- Composer: Stephen Schwartz
- Country of origin: United States
- Original language: English

Production
- Executive producers: Ben Winston; Raj Kapoor
- Producers: Christopher Scott; Siena Castillo; Rita Maye Bland; Dave Piendak
- Production locations: Dolby Theatre (Los Angeles); Gershwin Theatre (New York City) (Note: "For Good" performance)
- Editors: Simon B. Bryant; Tim Woolcott; Guy Harding; James Collett; Chris Black
- Running time: 93 minutes
- Production company: Fulwell 73

Original release
- Network: NBC
- Release: November 6, 2025

Related
- Wicked (2024); Wicked: For Good (2025)

Wicked: One Wonderful Night is a 2025 American television special promoting Universal Pictures' two-part film adaptation of the stage musical Wicked by Stephen Schwartz and Winnie Holzman. Led by Cynthia Erivo and Ariana Grande, performances included songs from the 2024 Wicked film, along with previews of songs from its 2025 sequel, Wicked: For Good.

The special first aired on November 6, 2025, on NBC, before streaming on Peacock the following day. A live album of the night's performances was also released.

== Cast ==
=== Performers ===
- Cynthia Erivo
- Ariana Grande
- Ethan Slater
- Bowen Yang
- Marissa Bode
- Michelle Yeoh
- Jeff Goldblum
- Idina Menzel (post-recorded)
- Kristin Chenoweth (post-recorded)
- Stephen Schwartz (post-recorded)

=== Appearances ===
- Jon M. Chu

Pre-recorded

- Jonathan Bailey
- Ludacris
- Lainey Wilson
- Ben Schwartz
- Khloé Kardashian
- Gayle King
- Heidi Klum
- Rob Gronkowski
- Shaquille O'Neal
- Leslie Odom Jr.
- Ken Jeong

== Setlist ==
- "No One Mourns the Wicked" – Ariana Grande, Bowen Yang, Ensemble, Audience
- "The Wizard and I" – Cynthia Erivo, Jeff Goldblum on acoustic guitar
- "What Is This Feeling?" / "Dear Old Shiz" – Cynthia Erivo, Ariana Grande
- "Popular" – Ariana Grande, Remington Glass
- "For Good" – Cynthia Erivo, Ariana Grande, Idina Menzel, Kristin Chenoweth, Stephen Schwartz on piano
- "I'm Not That Girl" – Cynthia Erivo
- "Dancing Through Life" – Bowen Yang, Ethan Slater, Marissa Bode
- "Thank Goodness" – Ariana Grande
- "Defying Gravity" – Cynthia Erivo
- "Get Happy" / "Happy Days Are Here Again" (Note: Medley arrangement originally performed by Barbra Streisand and Judy Garland on the October 6, 1963, episode of The Judy Garland Show.) – Cynthia Erivo, Ariana Grande

== Production ==
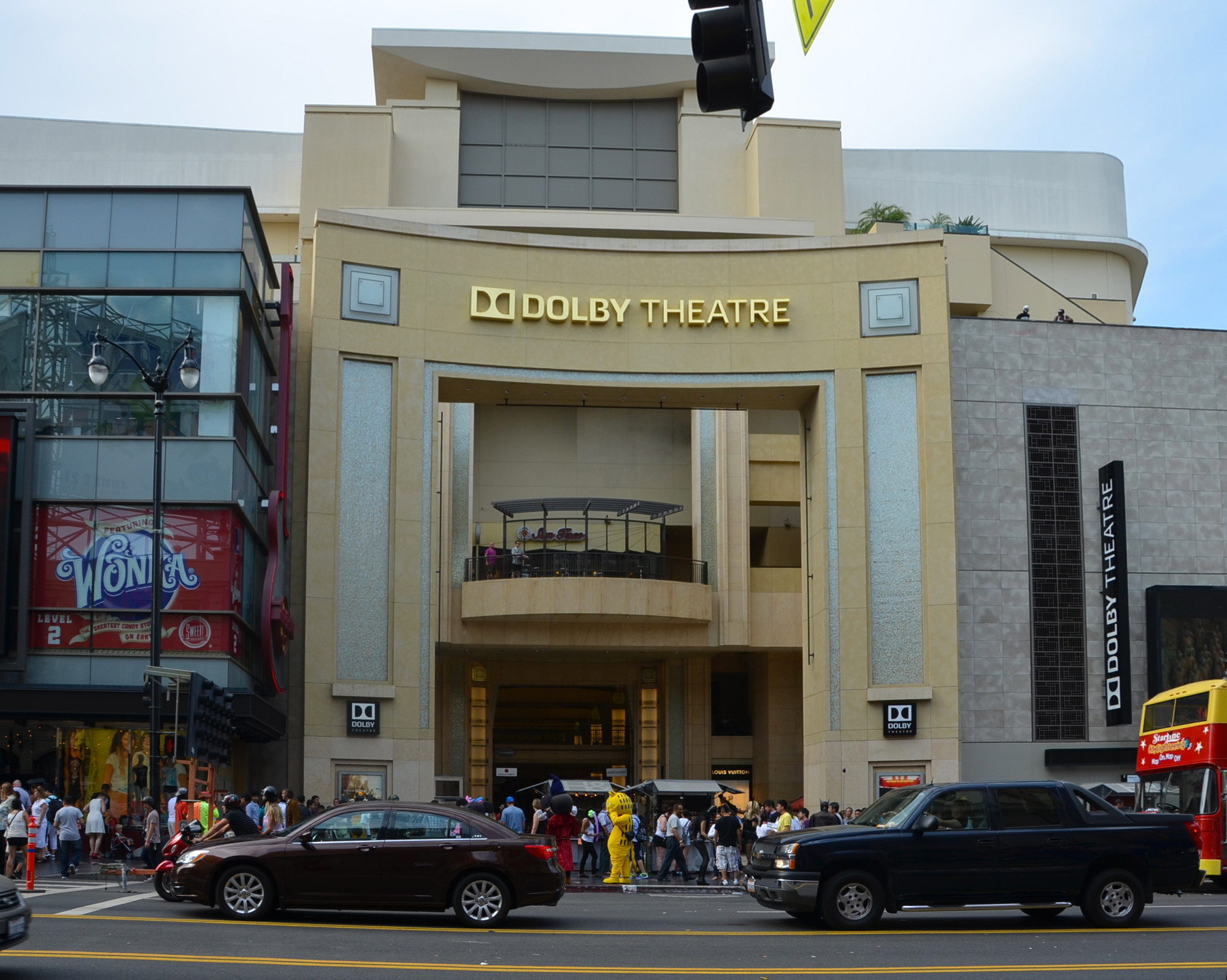
Exterior of the Dolby Theatre (pictured in 2015)

On July 9, 2025, during their upfront, NBC announced a two-hour Wicked special titled Wicked: Event Special to air in November 2025. It was confirmed that Cynthia Erivo and Ariana Grande would be part of the show and that songs from both films would be performed during the show.

On September 24, 2025, the show was filmed at Dolby Theatre in Los Angeles. During the special, Erivo and Grande wore outfits by Marni and Alexander McQueen. The "For Good" performance was recorded later and filmed at the Gershwin Theatre in New York City, where the musical Wicked has been staged since 2003, and was not shown to the audience during the filming.

In October 2025, the title of the special was changed to Wicked: One Wonderful Night, and NBC set a release date for November 6, 2025, to celebrate the release of Wicked: For Good two weeks later. Marissa Bode, Jon M. Chu, Jeff Goldblum, Stephen Schwartz, Ethan Slater, Bowen Yang, and Michelle Yeoh were also confirmed to appear.

One significant edit was done to Bode's introduction to "Defying Gravity", where she initially said the song was about standing up to a "power-hungry dictator", which was interpreted as a dig at the second Trump administration.

== Release ==
Wicked: One Wonderful Night was broadcast on NBC on November 6, 2025. Outside of the United States, it also aired in fifteen countries. An encore presentation aired on December 31, 2025.

== Reception ==
=== Viewership ===
In its original airing, Wicked: One Wonderful Night drew 3.6 million viewers, becoming NBC's second-highest rated special of the year behind the Saturday Night Live 50th Anniversary Special.

=== Critical response ===
Hope Sloop of Decider wrote, "I walked away from this special feeling genuine sadness that this was not a Woodstock-style concert that would have given thousands more the opportunity to watch it live. To say that Wicked: One Wonderful Night, complete with its surprise appearances, reimagined versions of classic songs, and outstanding staging is something that everyone should watch is an understatement. For those who love the movie or the musical, this is for you. For those who don't love the movie or musical, maybe go get checked by a doctor or something; you're missing out."

=== Accolades ===
Award	Date of ceremony	Category	Nominee(s)	Result	Ref.
Art Directors Guild Awards	February 28, 2026	Excellence in Production Design for a Variety Special	Misty Buckley	Nominated	
Costume Designers Guild Awards	February 12, 2026	Excellence in Variety, Reality-Competition, and Live Television	Katja Cahill	Nominated	
Hollywood Music in Media Awards	November 19, 2025	Music Performance / Special Program	Wicked: One Wonderful Night	Won	
Make-Up Artists & Hair Stylists Guild Awards	February 14, 2026	Best Contemporary Makeup in a Television Special, One-Hour or More Live Program Series or Movie for Television	Bruce Grayson, Brielle McKenna, Levi Vieira, and Sean Conklin	Nominated	
Make-Up Artists & Hair Stylists Guild Awards	February 14, 2026	Best Period and/or Character Hair Styling in a Television Special, One Hour or More Live Program Series	Edward Morrison, Lillie Frierson-King, Tiffany Bloom, and R'riyana Kline	Nominated	
NAACP Image Awards	February 28, 2026	Outstanding Variety Show (Series or Special)	Wicked: One Wonderful Night	Nominated	
Primetime Creative Arts Emmy Awards	September 5–6, 2026	Outstanding Variety Special (Pre-Recorded)	Ben Winston, Raj Kapoor, Paul Dugdale, Lou Fox, Patrick Menton, Rob Paine, Bex Hampson, Christopher Scott, Siena Castillo, Rita Maye-Bland, Dave Piendak, Chelsea Gonnering, Penny Le Vesconte, Cynthia Erivo, and Ariana Grande	Nominated	
Primetime Creative Arts Emmy Awards	September 5–6, 2026	Outstanding Choreography for Variety or Reality Programming	Christopher Scott (for "The Wizard and I")	Nominated	
Primetime Creative Arts Emmy Awards	September 5–6, 2026	Outstanding Hairstyling for a Variety, Nonfiction, or Reality Program	Edward Morrison, R'riyana Kline, Tiffany Bloom, Lillie Frierson, Cyndra Dunn, Sharif Poston, Lisa Long, and Deborah Pierce	Nominated	
Primetime Creative Arts Emmy Awards	September 5–6, 2026	Outstanding Lighting Design / Lighting Direction for a Variety Special	Bryan Klunder, Noah Mitz, Andrew O'Reilly, Patrick Boozer, Ryan Healey, Alen Sisul, Mike Hankowsky, and Jason Rudolph	Nominated	
Primetime Creative Arts Emmy Awards	September 5–6, 2026	Outstanding Music Direction	Stephen Oremus	Nominated	
Primetime Creative Arts Emmy Awards	September 5–6, 2026	Outstanding Technical Direction and Camerawork for a Special	Brandon Smith, Brett Turnbull, Rob Palmer, Karin Pelloni, Bobby Del Russo, Cary Symmons, Dean Clish, Jorge Ferris, Suzanne Ebner, Andrew Georgeopoulos, Danny Bonilla, Chad Smith, Jonny Harkins, Alex Hernandez, Rob Vuona, Scott Acosta, Randy Gomez Jr., Jeremy Freeman, and Tim Farmer	Nominated	
Set Decorators Society of America TV Awards	August 9, 2026	Best Achievement in Décor/Design of a Variety, Reality or Competition Series, or Special	Misty Buckley and Nia Freshman	Nominated	
