= For Good =

2003 musical theatre song

Song by Idina Menzel and Kristin Chenoweth

from the album Wicked
- Released: December 16, 2003
- Recorded: November 10, 2003
- Genre: Musical theatre, pop, show tune
- Label: Decca Broadway
- Songwriter: Stephen Schwartz

"For Good" is a song from the 2003 musical Wicked. It is sung as a duet between Elphaba (the Wicked Witch of the West) and Glinda (the Good Witch of the North) as a farewell. The song's score and lyrics were written by composer Stephen Schwartz. On the Broadway cast recording, the song is performed by Idina Menzel and Kristin Chenoweth. In the two-part film adaptation, "For Good" is performed by Cynthia Erivo and Ariana Grande in Wicked: For Good (2025). Schwartz commented after the show premiered that for the opening of the song, he asked his daughter what she would say if she would never see her best friend again, and her answer became the first verse of "For Good".

== Lyrics ==
The song's lyrics concern how both Elphaba and Glinda have been changed by their friendship with each other. Glinda begins by saying that, while she doesn't know if it is true that people come into each other's lives for a reason, "I know I'm who I am today because I knew you." Similarly, Elphaba tells Glinda that "whatever way our stories end, I know you have rewritten mine by being my friend." Elphaba also asks Glinda to forgive her for anything she might have done wrong, to which Glinda replies that "there's blame to share", but both agree that "none of it seems to matter anymore". They conclude the song by declaring that their friendship has changed both of them "for good" before embracing for the final time.

== Critical reception ==
Vulture ranked the song as the third-best from the Wicked score, describing it as "not particularly inventive", "comically heavy-handed", and almost overtaken by "flowery schmaltz", while ultimately concluding that the earned emotion that the show has built through the duo's relationship can "excuse all manner of lyrical sins". Playbill ranked it the seventh-best Stephen Schwartz song, deeming it less flashy than other Wicked songs, unique, powerful, meaningful and an insight into how relationships make people grow. Jenny Singer of The Forward wrote that it "belongs to an exclusive category: songs that have become staples at graduations, retirement celebrations and funerals".

== Cynthia Erivo and Ariana Grande version ==
"For Good"
- Digital cover

Promotional single by Cynthia Erivo and Ariana Grande

from the album Wicked: For Good – The Soundtrack
- Released: November 21, 2025
- Length: 6:17
- Label: Republic; Verve
- Songwriter: Stephen Schwartz
- Producers: Greg Wells; Stephen Oremus; Stephen Schwartz

Ariana Grande promotional singles chronology
"Supernatural" / "Dandelion" / "Hampstead" (2025)	"For Good" (2025)	"A Wicked Good Finale" (2025)

Lyric video
- "For Good" on YouTube

English actress Cynthia Erivo and American singer and actress Ariana Grande performed a rendition of "For Good" as Elphaba and Glinda respectively in Wicked: For Good (2025), the second of Universal Pictures' two-part film adaptation of Wicked, which was released on November 21, 2025. Their version of the song was released on the same day as part of the soundtrack album Wicked: For Good – The Soundtrack (2025) by Republic Records and Verve Records. The song received a nomination for Best Traditional Pop Vocal Performance at the 69th Annual Grammy Awards.

Erivo and Grande performed "For Good" with Menzel and Chenoweth for the television special Wicked: One Wonderful Night, which aired on November 6, 2025. Schwartz wrote new lyrics for the bridge, and also provided piano accompaniment for the four vocalists. The performance was filmed at the Gershwin Theatre, the home of the Wicked Broadway production. On August 16, 2026, "For Good" was performed by Erivo and Grande during the Eternal Sunshine Tour at the O_{2} Arena in London.

=== Track listing ===
7-inch vinyl

1. "For Good" – 6:17
2. "For Good" (instrumental) – 6:17

Digital EP

1. "For Good" – 6:17
2. "For Good" (edit) – 3:17
3. "For Good" (live from the Gershwin Theatre) (with Idina Menzel and Kristin Chenoweth) – 4:31
4. "For Good" (sing-along) – 6:17

=== Accolades ===
Awards and nominations for "For Good" by Cynthia Erivo and Ariana Grande
Organization	Year	Category	Result	Ref.
Nickelodeon Kids' Choice Awards	2026	Favorite Song from a Movie	Nominated	
Grammy Awards	2027	Best Traditional Pop Vocal Performance	Pending	

=== Charts ===
Chart performance for "For Good"
Chart (2025–2026)	Peak position
Australia (ARIA)	62
Canada Hot 100 (Billboard)	49
Global 200 (Billboard)	41
Ireland (IRMA)	21
Japan Hot Overseas (Billboard Japan)	9
New Zealand Hot Singles (RMNZ)	5
Philippines Hot 100 (Billboard Philippines)	43
Portugal (AFP)	178
UK Singles (Official Charts)	14
US Billboard Hot 100	43

Chart performance for "For Good" (Live from the Gershwin Theatre)
Chart (2025)	Peak position
New Zealand Hot Singles (RMNZ)	37

=== Release history ===
Release dates and formats for "For Good"
Region	Date	Format	Label(s)	Ref.
United States	November 21, 2025	7-inch vinyl	Republic; Verve	
Various	December 12, 2025	Digital download; streaming	Republic; Verve	

== Other versions and usage in media ==
- Internet personalities Sam Tsui and Nick Pitera recorded a cover that has been uploaded to their respective YouTube channels.
- Portions of the original version of the song were used at the ending of the September 4, 2013 repeat episode of the game show Wheel of Fortune, as a tribute to director Mark Corwin, who died on July 25, 2013.
