= Defying Gravity (song) =

Song from the musical "Wicked"

- 2024 picture disc

Song by Idina Menzel and Kristin Chenoweth

from the album Wicked
- Released: December 16, 2003
- Recorded: November 10, 2003
- Genre: Show tune; operatic pop; rock opera
- Length: 5:56
- Label: Decca Broadway
- Songwriter: Stephen Schwartz

"Defying Gravity", also called "Gravity", is a song from the musical Wicked, composed by Stephen Schwartz. It was originally recorded on November 10, 2003, by American actresses Idina Menzel and Kristin Chenoweth, who portrayed Elphaba and Glinda in the musical respectively. The song was released as part of the accompanying cast recording on December 16, 2003. It is mostly a solo sung by one of the show's two main characters, Elphaba, with two small duets at the beginning and the middle of the song between Elphaba and her friend Glinda, and a chorus part at the end in which the citizens of Oz sing.

The song serves as the climax of the musical's first act, in which Elphaba realizes the truth about the Wizard of Oz and vows to fight him, beginning her evolution into the "Wicked Witch of the West". It has been covered and reinterpreted numerous times, including by the cast of Glee and for the 2024 film adaptation of the musical starring Cynthia Erivo and Ariana Grande.

== Context and sequence ==
In Wicked, the song is the finale for the show's first act, when Elphaba discovers that the Wizard of Oz is not the heroic figure she had originally believed him to be. Realizing this, and despite Glinda's attempts to dissuade her, Elphaba vows to do everything in her power to fight the Wizard and his sinister plans against the Animals of Oz. She sings of how she wants to live without limits, going against the rules that others have set for her. During the song, Elphaba enchants a broomstick to levitate and, pursued by the Wizard's guards, rises above the angered citizens of Oz, who try in vain to "bring her down". The song is heavily cinematic and comes to a climax for the final verse.

The climax of the song features Elphaba flying high above the stage. The staging of the song in the original production relied heavily on special effects. The actress playing Elphaba was lifted up into the air by a hydraulic launch system, standing on a small platform with a safety restraint around her waist. Both the platform and restraints were concealed by a long false dress made of the same material as the actress's costume, which gave the illusion that she was not standing on anything. Black curtains (designed to look like Elphaba's cape billowing in the wind) and carefully designed lighting concealed the hydraulic arm lifting the platform. The sequence relied heavily on around 60 moving lights, smoke, and wind effects to give the illusion Elphaba was flying.

The Act One finale is "calibrated to get everyone to stick around for Act Two". The song is also used in the finale for the first film adaptation.

== Lyrics and music analysis ==
The core of the song is that "Elphaba finds power through her own outsider status", which has universal appeal due to audiences rooting for outsiders. The piece begins with Elphaba and Glinda talking. They then slip into song, bickering in short sharp phrases that are reminiscent of how people argue in real life. At this point, the key signature is constantly shifting, creating a sense of unease. The song is in cut common time, but the duo rarely stick to the bar lines, often jumping in halfway in a syncopated style. In the passage "I’m through with playing by the rules...", an interval of an 11th is used, in "the rules".

The song builds on leitmotifs established earlier in the show and "raises the stakes" by lifting Elphaba's voice an octave and physically lifting her on a cherry picker, embodying the first time the audience sees her as the Wicked Witch of the West. The dramatic conclusion of the song features a "loud, screamy" climax of "bring me down" followed by a vocal riff that, according to Jackson McHenry writing for Vulture, has the potential to hurt the performer's vocal cords. Due to the song's difficulty, it is achievable for a few and impossible for most, thereby making those who succeed outsiders.

== Reception and legacy ==
A ranking in Vulture listed the number as the best song from Wicked, deeming it the "crown jewel of the score", though noted it is an easy song to mock due to it being "ripe for acrid belting and silly embellishment". Another article in Vulture described it as the "big, belt-y centerpiece of the show", and felt it had since established an "ambivalent legacy" as the "silliest, most inspiring, most enduring song in recent Broadway history".

In the original production, if a computer system for the hydraulic platform did not sense that the restraints were safely closed, the platform would not lift. If this happened, or if the platform failed to lift for another reason, cast members were taught a "Plan B" or "no-fly" sequence where Elphaba runs downstage and the other cast members, playing the guards and townspeople, lie down onstage to simulate looking up to a now airborne Elphaba.

The song was used to wake up astronauts aboard space shuttle mission STS-131 in April 2010 for astronaut Dorothy Metcalf-Lindenburger in honor of the day's planned extra-vehicular activity.

== Charts ==
Chart performance for "Defying Gravity" by Idina Menzel and Kristin Chenoweth
Chart (2024)	Peak position
UK Singles Downloads (Official Charts)	74
UK Singles Sales (OCC)	79
UK Physical Singles (OCC)	4
UK Vinyl Singles (OCC)	3

== Certifications ==
Certifications for "Defying Gravity" by Idina Menzel and Kristin Chenoweth
Region	Certification	Certified units/sales
United Kingdom (BPI)	Platinum	600,000^{‡}
^{‡} Sales+streaming figures based on certification alone.

== International Wicked recordings ==
All official versions of "Defying Gravity"
Language	Original cast		Title	Translation
Language	Glinda	Elphaba	Title	Translation
Danish	Annette Heick, Johanne Milland	Maria Lucia Rosenberg, Nanna Rossen	"Mine vinger bærer" "Leve uden tyngdekraft"	"My Wings Carry Me" "To Live Without Gravity"
Dutch	Chantal Janzen	Willemijn Verkaik	"Ik Lach om Zwaartekracht"	"I Laugh at Gravity"
English	Kristin Chenoweth	Idina Menzel	"Defying Gravity"	
Finnish	Anna-Maija Tuokko	Maria Ylipää	"Painovoimaa Murtamaan"	"Break Gravity"
German	Lucy Scherer	Willemijn Verkaik	"Frei und Schwerelos"	"Free and Weightless"
Japanese	沼尾みゆき (Miyuki Numao)	濱田めぐみ (Megumi Hamada)	"自由を求めて" ("Jiyū o motomete")	"Looking for Freedom"
Korean	정선아 (Jeong Sun-ah) 김보경 (Kim Bo-gyeong) 김소현 (Kim So-hyun)	옥주현 (Ock Joo-hyun) 박혜나 (Park Hyena) 김선영 (Kim Seon-yeong)	"중력을 벗어나" ("Jungnyeogeul beoseona")	"Escape Gravity"
Portuguese	Fabi Bang	Myra Ruiz	"Desafiar a Gravidade"	"Defy Gravity"
Spanish	Cecilia de la Cueva	Danna Paola	"En Contra de la Gravedad"	"Against Gravity"
Swedish	Anna Salonen	Feline Andersson	"Spränga gränserna"	"Push the Limits"

The above table does not include the versions performed in the movie.

== Idina Menzel single ==
"Defying Gravity"

Single by Idina Menzel
- Released: March 1, 2007
- Recorded: 2007
- Genre: Pop
- Length: 3:46
- Label: Warner Bros.
- Songwriter: Stephen Schwartz
- Producer: Glen Ballard

Idina Menzel singles chronology
"Take Me or Leave Me" (2006)	"Defying Gravity" (2007)	"Brave" (2007)

Idina Menzel, having reprised her role as Elphaba in the London production of Wicked in 2006, recorded a remixed "pop mainstream" version of the song. It was released as a single on March 1, 2007, and was later included on the UK and iTunes versions of her 2008 album I Stand. The remix of "Defying Gravity" was also the anthem at the 2007 Gay Pride Parade and Festival in Los Angeles, and appears on the official CD from the event. The track charted at no. 60 on the official UK Singles chart in May 2008, shortly after a contestant sang "Defying Gravity" on an episode of the BBC television programme I'd Do Anything. She released the song as a single a second time in 2012 from her album Live: Barefoot at the Symphony.

=== Formats and track listings ===
US CD single

1. "Defying Gravity" (Tracy Young's Flying Monkey's Club Mix) – 8:02
2. "Defying Gravity" (Eddie Baez Club Mix) – 8:42
3. "Defying Gravity" (Hani Flying So High Club Mix) – 7:04
4. "Defying Gravity" (Josh Harris Vocal Club Mix) – 7:16
5. "Defying Gravity" (Funky Junction & Antony Reale Club Mix) – 6:22
6. "Defying Gravity" (Single version) – 3:48

Digital single

1. "Defying Gravity" (Album version) – 3:46

Digital maxi single

1. "Defying Gravity" (Tracy Young's Flying Monkey's Radio Edit) – 3:45
2. "Defying Gravity" (Eddie Baez Radio Edit) – 4:54
3. "Defying Gravity" (Funky Junction & Antony Reale Radio Edit) – 4:36
4. "Defying Gravity" (Hani Flying So High Short Mix) – 4:55
5. "Defying Gravity" (Josh Harris Radio Edit) – 3:53

Digital maxi single (DJ version)

1. "Defying Gravity" (Tracy Young's Flying Monkey's Club Mix) – 8:02
2. "Defying Gravity" (Eddie Baez Club Mix) – 8:42
3. "Defying Gravity" (Funky Junction & Antony Reale Club Mix) – 6:22
4. "Defying Gravity" (Hani Flying So High Club Mix) – 7:04
5. "Defying Gravity" (Josh Harris Vocal Club Mix) – 7:16

=== Official versions ===
- "Defying Gravity" (Album version) – 3:46
- "Defying Gravity" (Single version) – 3:48
- "Defying Gravity" (Eddie Baez Club Mix) – 8:42
- "Defying Gravity" (Eddie Baez Radio Edit) – 4:54
- "Defying Gravity" (Funky Junction & Antony Reale Club Mix) – 6:22
- "Defying Gravity" (Funky Junction & Antony Reale Radio Edit) – 4:36
- "Defying Gravity" (Hani Flying So High Club Mix) – 7:04
- "Defying Gravity" (Hani Flying So High Short Mix) – 4:55
- "Defying Gravity" (Josh Harris Vocal Club Mix) – 7:16
- "Defying Gravity" (Josh Harris Radio Edit) – 3:53
- "Defying Gravity" (Tracy Young's Flying Monkey's Club Mix) – 8:02
- "Defying Gravity" (Tracy Young's Flying Monkey's Radio Edit) – 3:45
- "Defying Gravity" (Live from Soundstage) – 3:56

=== Charts ===
Chart performance for "Defying Gravity" by Idina Menzel
Chart (2007–08)	Peak position
Austria (Ö3 Austria Top 40)	72
US Dance Club Songs (Billboard)	5
US Hot Singles Sales (Billboard)	8
UK Singles (Official Charts)	60

== Glee cast versions ==
"Defying Gravity"

Single by Glee cast

from the album Glee: The Music, Volume 1
- Released: November 11, 2009
- Recorded: 2009
- Genre: Pop
- Length: 2:21
- Label: Columbia
- Songwriter: Stephen Schwartz
- Producers: Adam Anders; Peer Åström

Glee cast singles chronology
"Dancing with Myself" (2009)	"Defying Gravity" (2009)	"Proud Mary" (2009)

"Defying Gravity" was recorded twice by the cast of American television series Glee, which aired on Fox between 2009 and 2015. It first featured in the series' ninth episode "Wheels" in 2009, where Rachel (Lea Michele) and Kurt (Chris Colfer) sing it separately in a competition for the lead solo. A duet version by Rachel and Kurt was released as a single available for digital download on November 11, 2009, as well as solo versions by both, and included on the soundtrack album Glee: The Music, Volume 1. The song was featured again in 2014 in the twelfth episode of season five, "100", which was also the hundredth episode in the series, this time sung by Rachel, Kurt and Mercedes (Amber Riley). The second version was released as part of the soundtrack album Glee: The Music – Celebrating 100 Episodes on March 18, 2014.

The plotline in "Wheels" of Rachel and Kurt singing "Defying Gravity" for a competition was inspired by an anecdote of Chris Colfer, the actor playing Kurt. Having a countertenor range, Colfer wanted to sing the song in talent shows in high school, but was repeatedly denied the chance during high school as it is a solo usually reserved for female artists. Murphy explained: "I found a way to write it into the show because that's in a nutshell what this show is about: someone being told that they can't do something because of what the perception of them is as opposed to what their real ability is." Colfer stated that the opportunity to finally sing the song "really meant the world" to him, and that: "It's absolutely terrifying to watch yourself do something you've dreamed about for such a long time. I know I'm definitely not the best singer, but I think the message, the story behind the song about defying limits and borders placed by others, hopefully all that gets across with the performance. Although I do some very 'Kurtsy' things in the song, it's probably one of the most honest and close-to-heart scenes I've ever filmed or performed for that matter."

"Defying Gravity" was the second best-selling Glee song as of October 22, 2010, with 335,000 downloads based on data from Nielsen SoundScan. As of March 20, 2015, it was the fifth most-downloaded Glee original cast recording, with 529,000 downloads according to Nielsen Music.

=== Charts ===
Chart performance for "Defying Gravity" by Glee cast
Chart (2009)	Peak position
Australia (ARIA)	58
Canada Hot 100 (Billboard)	38
Ireland (IRMA)	19
Netherlands (Single Top 100)	59
UK Singles (Official Charts)	38
US Billboard Hot 100	31

== Cynthia Erivo version ==
"Defying Gravity"

Single by Cynthia Erivo featuring Ariana Grande

from the album Wicked: The Soundtrack
- B-side: "Defying Gravity (sing-along)"
- Released: December 3, 2024
- Recorded: 2023
- Studio: AIR Studios (London, England); Power Station (New York, NY)
- Genre: Show tune
- Length: 7:39; 3:33 (edit)
- Label: Republic; Verve
- Songwriter: Stephen Schwartz
- Producers: Greg Wells; Stephen Oremus; Stephen Schwartz

Cynthia Erivo singles chronology
"Glowing Up" (2021)	"Defying Gravity" (2024)	"Replay" (2025)

Ariana Grande singles chronology
"Popular" (2024)	"Defying Gravity" (2024)	"Twilight Zone" (2025)

Audio video
- "Defying Gravity" on YouTube

English actress Cynthia Erivo and American singer and actress Ariana Grande performed a rendition of "Defying Gravity" as Elphaba and Glinda respectively in the first part of Universal Pictures' two-part film adaptation of Wicked, which was released on November 22, 2024. Their version of the song was released on the same day as part of the soundtrack album Wicked: The Soundtrack (2024) by Republic Records and Verve Records. "Defying Gravity" was released to US contemporary hit radio stations on December 3, 2024. The song won Best Pop Duo/Group Performance at the 68th Annual Grammy Awards.

=== Composition ===
The song appears as the concluding number of the film, with various score and scene extensions between the verses to work as a cliffhanger ending. The climactic shot of the number, in which Elphaba does her signature "battle cry" while up in the air at sunset, sees her cape enlarge and billow in the wind to evoke the "cherry picker" effect from the stage musical. Rather than ending with Elphaba's final verse, as it does on the radio edit, a score flourish inspired by the "Sunrise" portion of Richard Strauss' Also sprach Zarathustra (made famous by 2001: A Space Odyssey) was added at the suggestion of editor Myron Kerstein, so that the song and film wouldn't end abruptly. In one of the film's trailers, the song was remixed with Herbert Stothart's iconic "Wicked Witch/Miss Gulch" motif from Metro-Goldwyn-Mayer's 1939 film version of The Wizard of Oz. The lyric "Get her!" from the original was changed to "Kill her!".

Filming of the sequence was delayed by six months due to the 2023 SAG-AFTRA strike and took until about a year into production. Erivo stated that she viewed the song as a "massive journey" and wanted her character's voice to grow throughout the song. Regarding her battle cry at the end of the sequence, "I was always looking forward to that moment, just because everything builds to there. Your body and your brain and your mind – and your heart, really – are waiting to be able to release that one final note, because it’s the ultimate moment where [Elphaba] can become herself."

A 14-minute video breakdown of Kerstein's editing of the sequence, with him analyzing his creative choices using the film's Avid Media Composer timeline, was released on December 23, 2024. Kerstein would later repeat this demonstration in person at the 2025 NAB Show on April 5, 2025, during a conversation panel with him and cinematographer Alice Brooks.

=== Critical reception ===
Writing for Billboard, Stephen Daw named "Defying Gravity" the best song of the soundtrack album and lauded Erivo's version as "one of the single best movie musical interpretations of a song that this reviewer has ever heard, and one that more than surpasses the already astronomical expectations surrounding it". He noted that the instrumental was largely unchanged from the original, leaving Erivo to put her own stamp on the song "in a way that makes you feel as though you’re hearing it for the first time". Daw praised her "awe-inspiring dexterity" in traversing her vocal range and letting the full set of emotions be heard through her voice, "wringing out every note for all it is worth" in the song's infamous bridge and battle cry. He also praised Grande's "necessary and vital assist" with her acting at the beginning of the song and her "gorgeous harmonies" in the middle. Likewise, Erivo was commended for her "raw emotion and power" by The Daily Telegraph and her flawless delivery by Variety's Chris Willman. Lisa Laman of Looper named it one of the best movie scenes of 2024, writing: "Lengthier pauses are incorporated throughout the song to allow Elphaba and Glinda more time to interact. Their dissipating friendship really hits home with these freshly concocted breaks. Where 'Defying Gravity' really soars in its new qualities, though, is a segment in which Elphaba falls to the ground in Emerald City after she first attempts to fly, as past negative comments from others race through her mind. Watching Elphaba soar back up to the sky and finish up 'Defying Gravity' is a tremendous sight. Erivo's powerful vocals and a dazzlingly bombastic instrumental accompaniment cap off this showstopper musical number on a glorious note."

=== Impact on popular culture ===
On November 21, 2024, a clip from the press tour interview in which the journalist Tracey E. Gilchrist told Erivo and Grande that viewers were "holding space" because the lyrics of "Defying Gravity" went viral created multiple Internet memes. Gilchrist later explained what she meant: "For me, it means being in the moment, not being distracted and feeling something on a cellular level ... I think you can hold space with lyrics of a song – one you've heard hundreds of times – and it can suddenly take on new meaning when you're a queer person." In December 2024, Universal Pictures commissioned a float based on the film to appear in the 2025 Rose Parade, with the float itself being named "Defying Gravity" after the song. On New Year's Eve of that year, fans were urged to play the song at 11:53 pm EST (9:28 pm EST if viewing the film) in order to time Elphaba's battle cry with the stroke of midnight on January 1, 2025, to ring in the New Year. The song was featured prominently in London's New Year's Eve fireworks display for 2026 with Erivo providing a voice message over the track.

=== Live performances ===
The song was performed by Cynthia Erivo and Ariana Grande to open the 97th Academy Awards ceremony as part of a medley of songs from Wicked, The Wizard of Oz and The Wiz. Erivo also performed the song twice for the television special Wicked: One Wonderful Night, which aired in November 2025.

=== Accolades ===
Awards and nominations for "Defying Gravity" by Cynthia Erivo featuring Ariana Grande
Organization	Year	Category	Result	Ref.
Hollywood Music In Media Awards	2024	Song – Onscreen Performance (Film)	Nominated	
Digital Spy Reader Awards	2024	Most Mindblowing Movie Moment	Runner-up	
Online Film & Television Association	2024	Best Adapted Song	Won	
Online Film & Television Association	2024	Most Cinematic Moment	Nominated	
BET Awards	2025	BET Her Award	Nominated	
Nickelodeon Kids' Choice Awards	2025	Favorite Song from a Movie	Won	
Grammy Awards	2026	Best Pop Duo/Group Performance	Won	
Brit Awards	2026	Song of the Year	Nominated	

=== Charts ===
Chart performance for "Defying Gravity" by Cynthia Erivo featuring Ariana Grande
Chart (2024–2025)	Peak position
Australia (ARIA)	31
Canada Hot 100 (Billboard)	63
Global 200 (Billboard)	41
Ireland (IRMA)	10
Japan Download Songs (Billboard Japan)	84
Japan Hot Overseas (Billboard Japan)	11
New Zealand Hot Singles (RMNZ)	6
Philippines (Philippines Hot 100)	19
South Korea Download (Circle)	89
UK Singles (Official Charts)	7
US Billboard Hot 100	44
US Adult Pop Airplay (Billboard)	33
US Pop Airplay (Billboard)	36

=== Certifications ===
Certifications for "Defying Gravity" by Cynthia Erivo featuring Ariana Grande
Region	Certification	Certified units/sales
Brazil (Pro-Música Brasil)	Gold	20,000^{‡}
New Zealand (RMNZ)	Gold	15,000^{‡}
United Kingdom (BPI)	Gold	400,000^{‡}
United States (RIAA)	Platinum	1,000,000^{‡}
^{‡} Sales+streaming figures based on certification alone.

=== Release history ===
Release dates and formats for "Defying Gravity" by Cynthia Erivo featuring Ariana Grande
Region	Date	Format	Label(s)	Ref.
United States	December 3, 2024	Contemporary hit radio	Republic; Verve	
Italy	December 13, 2024	Radio airplay	Island	
Various	March 21, 2025	7-inch vinyl	Republic	

== See also ==
- Wicked: The Life and Times of the Wicked Witch of the West
- Broadway theatre
- West End theatre
- "Let It Go"
