= The Wizard and I =

2003 song in the musical Wicked

Song by Carole Shelley and Idina Menzel

from the album Wicked
- Released: December 16, 2003
- Recorded: November 10, 2003
- Genre: Show tunes
- Label: Decca Broadway
- Songwriter: Stephen Schwartz

"The Wizard and I" is a musical number from the musical Wicked. It is primarily a solo number for the character of Elphaba, serving as her "I Want" song, though the character Madame Morrible also sings in the introduction to the song.

== Summary ==
The song is performed in the beginning of the first act of the musical. In it, Madame Morrible tells Elphaba of her talents, and tells her that she will arrange a meeting with the Wizard. This begins Elphaba's desire to be accepted despite her skin color, with the aid of the Wizard, whom she still believes to be genuine, and able to help her with all the discrimination she has been dealing with. Elphaba also sings about redeeming herself in her father, Frexspar's, and her sister Nessarose's eyes. Also, Elphaba dreams about becoming a new person, not on the outside, but doing great deeds in league with the Wizard, and forming Oz's "favorite team."

"The Wizard and I" features the "Unlimited" theme present throughout the musical. In this piece, Elphaba prophesizes a celebration throughout Oz regarding her, though she does not know it regards her "death" at the end of the musical, after being "melted" by Dorothy, which Elphaba ironically sings about in saying that she is "so happy I could melt." She also imagines that "when people see me [Elphaba] they will scream" from love, not fear. Toward the song's climax, she declares that she will be the center of a "celebration throughout Oz" that occurs in the show's opening.

== Cynthia Erivo version ==
"The Wizard and I"

Song by Cynthia Erivo featuring Michelle Yeoh

from the album Wicked: The Soundtrack
- Released: November 22, 2024
- Recorded: 2023
- Genre: Show tune
- Length: 5:36
- Label: Republic; Verve
- Songwriter: Stephen Schwartz
- Producers: Greg Wells; Stephen Oremus; Stephen Schwartz

Music videos
- Visualizer (Republic Records) on YouTube
- Film clip (Movieclips) on YouTube

The song appears in the first part of Universal Pictures' two-part film adaptation of Wicked, released on November 22, 2024, sung by Cynthia Erivo as Elphaba and Michelle Yeoh as Madame Morrible. It was released on the same day as part of the soundtrack album Wicked: The Soundtrack (2024) by Republic Records and Verve Records.

=== Charts ===
Chart performance for "The Wizard and I" by Cynthia Erivo
Chart (2024)	Peak position
US Billboard Hot 100	92

== Other versions ==
The original German recording of this song, "Der Zauberer und ich", is sung by Dutch actress, Willemijn Verkaik. She sings this song in three languages - German, Dutch and English. In an interview, Verkaik said that for her, "The Wizard and I" is the hardest song for her to sing in the English productions. This is not the case for the German and Dutch productions, where "No Good Deed" was considerably harder.

John Barrowman has a reworking of the song for his self-titled album John Barrowman titled "The Doctor and I", which is an exclusive bonus track on iTunes. Ariana Grande, who plays Glinda in the two-part film adaptation of the musical, performed the song on the 2018 TV special A Very Wicked Halloween. Ben Platt, son of Wicked producer Marc Platt, recorded a cover of the song for the album of MCC Theater's 25th annual "Miscast" gala and performed it at the live event itself in April 2025.

== See also ==
- "I Want" song
