= Decca Broadway =

- Parent company: Universal Music Group
- Founded: 1999
- Distributor(s): Verve Label Group
- Genre: Musical Theatre
- Country of origin: US
- Official website: Decca Broadway

Decca Broadway is an American record label specializing in musical theater recordings founded in 1999 by Decca Records and is a unit of Universal Music Group. Decca Broadway issued both new original cast albums as well as reissues of classic musical theater performances from the catalogues of record labels Universal Music and predecessor companies acquired over the years including Decca which pioneered the release of original cast albums. Decca Broadway was absorbed into UMG's Verve Records in 2013. Verve Label Group relaunched the Decca Broadway label in 2019.

== History ==
In 1949, Decca began to re-release the best-selling of these albums on LP and in the late 1950s began offer different versions of electronically enhanced for stereo editions, which sounded thin and hollow.

Some of these versions employed varying combinations of phase shift, comb filters and EQ splits over the two channels - sometimes all at the same time while other more popular versions left the original monaural track alone on the left and put all the fake re-processing on the right. At least with that format, a record buyer could enjoy the original untouched monaural performance simply by switching their balance control all the way to the left.

In the early days of home consoles with 3-channel amplifiers, Decca and other labels responded by releasing still other versions with the untouched monaural program alone in the lateral plane and the processing alone in the vertical plane. This allowed phonograph owners with such a console to raise or lower just the center (mono) channel to their individually desired level.

The label was out of the business of recording new cast albums by the end of the 1950s. Decca was bought by MCA and in the early 1970s many of these titles were re-released on the MCA label, all using the fake stereo masters, a condition which for the most part wasn't even beginning to be rectified until 20 years later until expanded silver, gold and diamond anniversary editions were prepared - some using pristine previously-unheard safety masters of some performances that had become worn out after repeated re-mastering..

MCA released many of their classic shows on CD in the 1990s, going back to original master discs and tapes to generate excellent sounding (and complete) remasters of the originals. When MCA and PolyGram were merged into the new Universal Music Group, a new label, Decca Broadway, was born. The new label's catalogue incorporated other musical theatre albums whose rights were owned by Universal Music.

Decca Broadway has re-mastered and reissued virtually every cast album in the old Decca catalogue including many rare titles that had not been available in almost 50 years. Decca Broadway has also recorded recent hits including: Wicked, Monty Python's Spamalot, Seussical, and Spring Awakening. Wicked in particular has been a big seller for the label and continues to sell well. Although they are being selective about what they record, Decca Broadway plans to continue making cast albums, including Mel Brooks' Young Frankenstein and Andrew Lippa's The Addams Family: A New Musical. Although some of the slower-selling catalog titles have been deleted, many remain available as downloads.

In 2012, UMG acquired EMI, and thus Decca Broadway took over the rights to EMI's musical theatre catalogue. The following year, the imprint was absorbed into Verve Records.

In 2019, Verve Label Group relaunched the Decca Broadway label.
