= Stephen Oremus =

American musician, musical director and orchestrator

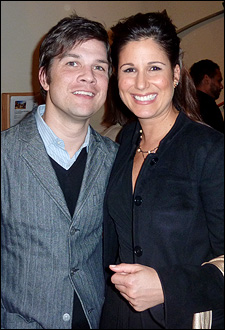
- Stephen Oremus (left) with Stephanie J. Block (right).
- Born: 1971 (age 54–55); Livingston, New Jersey, United States
- Occupations: Music producer, conductor, music supervisor, orchestrator

Stephen Oremus is an American musician who has worked on Broadway theatre productions as musical director and as orchestrator. His credits include arranger and orchestrator for the music for Avenue Q, musical director and arranger for Wicked, arranger and orchestrator for All Shook Up, and musical director for 9 to 5. His orchestrations (with Larry Hochman) for The Book of Mormon won him a Tony Award in 2011, for Best Orchestrations. Oremus also won the Tony Award for Best Orchestrations for Kinky Boots.

Oremus served as orchestra conductor and music director for Frozen 2 and Rufus Wainwright's 2006 Judy Garland tribute concert, which was released as the 2007 album Rufus Does Judy at Carnegie Hall and DVD Rufus! Rufus! Rufus! Does Judy! Judy! Judy!: Live from the London Palladium. In 2022, Oremus and Broadway stars Elizabeth Stanley, Nikki Renée Daniels, Jeff Kready, and Tamar Greene performed reimagined renditions of iconic songs from the satirical animated series South Park with a 30-piece orchestra in celebration of the show's 25th anniversary.

He is the arranger and producer of the bare bones sophisticated version of "New York, New York" sung by Carey Mulligan in the feature film Shame.

== Early life ==
Oremus was born and raised in Livingston, New Jersey, and attended Livingston High School. He graduated from the Berklee College of Music in Boston in 1992, with a major in film scoring.

== Personal life ==
Oremus is married to actor, singer, and dancer Justin Bohon.

== Stage ==
Year	Title	Role	Venue	Ref.
2003	Avenue Q	Music Orchestrations, Musical Supervisor, Music Arrangements	Broadway, John Golden Theatre	
2003	Wicked	Musical Supervisor, Conductor, Music Director, Music Arrangements	Broadway, Gershwin Theatre	
2005	All Shook Up	Musical Supervisor, Arrangements, Orchestration	Broadway, Palace Theatre	
2006	High Fidelity	Vocal Arrangements	Broadway, Imperial Theatre	
2008	The Yellow Brick Road Not Taken	Musical Supervisor	Broadway, Gershwin Theatre	
2008	9 to 5	Keyboard 1, Conductor, Musical Director, Additional Orchestrations, Incidental Music Arrangements	Broadway, Marquis Theatre	
2011	The Book of Mormon	Co-Orchestrator, Vocal Arrangements, Music Director, Conductor, Keyboards	Broadway, Eugene O'Neill Theatre	
2012	Kinky Boots	Arrangements, Orchestrations, Vocal Supervision	Broadway, Al Hirschfeld Theatre	
2018	Frozen	Conductor, Music Supervisor, Arrangements	Broadway, St. James Theatre	
2022	How I Learned to Drive	Musical Director, Arrangements	Broadway, Samuel J. Friedman Theatre	
2025	Smash	Musical Director, Arrangements	Broadway, Imperial Theatre	

== Filmography ==
Year	Title	Role
2006	Bambi II	Music Consultant
2013	Frozen	Conductor
2019	Frozen 2	Conductor, Vocal Arranger
2020	Jingle Jangle: A Christmas Journey	Orchestrator
2024	Wicked	Conductor, Producer, Music Supervisor, Arrangements
2025	Wicked: For Good	Conductor, Producer, Music Supervisor, Arrangements
2025	Wicked: One Wonderful Night	Musical Director

== Awards and nominations ==
Year	Award	Category	Work	Result	Ref.
2009	Drama Desk Awards	Outstanding Orchestrations	9 to 5	Nominated	
2011	Drama Desk Awards	Outstanding Orchestrations	The Book of Mormon	Won	
2015	Primetime Emmy Awards	Outstanding Music Direction	87th Academy Awards	Nominated	
2026	Primetime Emmy Awards	Outstanding Music Direction	Wicked: One Wonderful Night	Nominated	
2011	Tony Awards	Best Orchestrations	The Book of Mormon	Won	
2013	Tony Awards	Best Orchestrations	Kinky Boots	Won	
