= List of awards and nominations received by Stephen Schwartz =

Stephen Schwartz awards and nominations
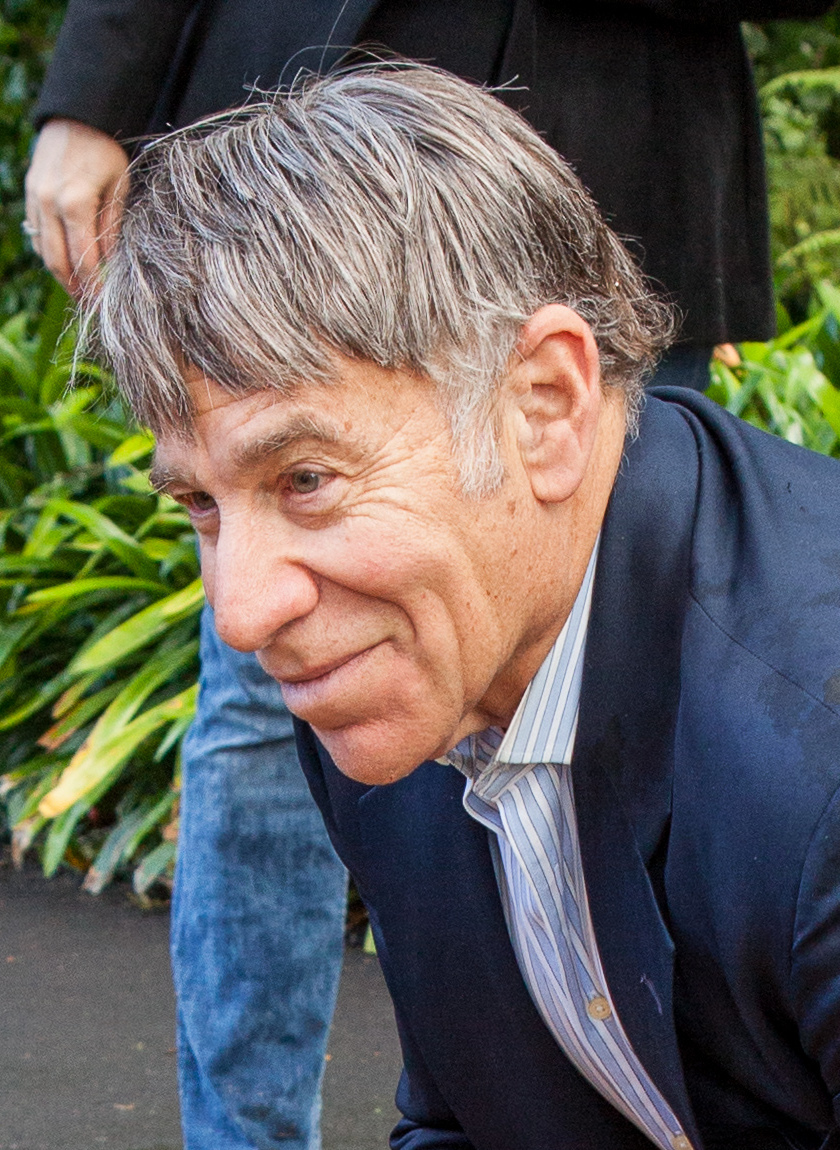
- Schwartz in 2018
Awards and nominations
Award	Wins	Nominations
Academy Awards	3	9
Golden Globe Awards	1	5
Grammy Awards	3	14
Laurence Olivier Awards	0	1
Tony Awards	0	6

Totals (Note: Certain award groups do not simply award one winner. They acknowledge several different recipients, have runners-up, and have third place. Since this is a specific recognition and is different from losing an award, runner-up mentions are considered wins in this award tally. For simplification and to avoid errors, each award in this list has been presumed to have had a prior nomination.)
- Wins: 17
- Nominations: 83

Stephen Schwartz is an American musical theater lyricist and composer. The following are a list of his wins and nominations for awards in film, music, and stage.

Schwartz has won three Academy Awards, three Grammy Awards, four Drama Desk Awards, and a Golden Globe Award. He has received six Tony Award nominations (also receiving the Isabelle Stevenson Award in 2015). He was given a star on the Hollywood Walk of Fame in 2008. Inducted into both the American Theater Hall of Fame and the Songwriters Hall of Fame in 2009.

== Major associations ==
=== Academy Awards ===
Year	Category	Nominated work	Result	Ref.
1995	Best Original Musical or Comedy Score	Pocahontas	Won	
1995	Best Original Song	"Colors of the Wind" (from Pocahontas)	Won	
1996	Best Original Musical or Comedy Score	The Hunchback of Notre Dame	Nominated	
1998	Best Original Musical or Comedy Score	The Prince of Egypt	Nominated	
1998	Best Original Song	"When You Believe" (from The Prince of Egypt)	Won	
2007	Best Original Song	"Happy Working Song" (from Enchanted)	Nominated	
2007	Best Original Song	"So Close" (from Enchanted)	Nominated	
2007	Best Original Song	"That's How You Know" (from Enchanted)	Nominated	
2024	Best Original Score	Wicked	Nominated	

=== Golden Globe Awards ===
Year	Category	Nominated work	Result	Ref.
1995	Best Original Song	"Colors of the Wind" (from Pocahontas)	Won	
1998	Best Original Song	"When You Believe" (from The Prince of Egypt)	Nominated	
2007	Best Original Song	"That's How You Know" (from Enchanted)	Nominated	
2025	Best Original Song	"The Girl in the Bubble" (from Wicked: For Good)	Nominated	
2025	Best Original Song	"No Place Like Home" (from Wicked: For Good)	Nominated	

=== Grammy Awards ===
Year	Category	Nominated work	Result	Ref.
1971	Best Score from an Original Cast Show Album	Godspell	Won	
1973	Best Score from the Original Cast Show Album	Pippin	Nominated	
1974	Best Score from the Original Cast Show Album	The Magic Show	Nominated	
1995	Best Musical Album for Children	Pocahontas Sing-Along	Nominated	
1995	Best Song Written Specifically for a Motion Picture or for Television	"Colors of the Wind" (from Pocahontas)	Won	
1999	Best Song Written for a Motion Picture, Television or Other Visual Media	"When You Believe" (from The Prince of Egypt)	Nominated	
2004	Best Musical Show Album	Wicked	Won	
2008	Best Song Written for Motion Picture, Television or Other Visual Media	"Ever Ever After" (from Enchanted)	Nominated	
2008	Best Song Written for Motion Picture, Television or Other Visual Media	"That's How You Know" (from Enchanted)	Nominated	
2020	Best Musical Theater Album	The Prince of Egypt	Nominated	
2021	Best Musical Theater Album	Stephen Schwartz's Snapshots	Nominated	
2025	Best Compilation Soundtrack for Visual Media	Wicked: The Soundtrack	Nominated	
2025	Best Score Soundtrack for Visual Media	Wicked	Nominated	
2025	Best Instrumental Composition	"Train to Emerald City" (from Wicked)	Nominated	
2026	Best Song Written for Visual Media	"No Place Like Home" (from Wicked: For Good)	Pending	

=== Laurence Olivier Awards ===
Year	Category	Nominated work	Result	Ref.
1990	Musical of the Year	The Baker's Wife	Nominated	

=== Tony Awards ===
Year	Category	Nominated work	Result	Ref.
1973	Best Original Score	Pippin	Nominated	
1977	Best Original Score	Godspell	Nominated	
1978	Best Book of a Musical	Working	Nominated	
1978	Best Original Score	Working	Nominated	
1987	Best Original Score	Rags	Nominated	
2004	Best Original Score	Wicked	Nominated	
2015	Isabelle Stevenson Award	—N/a	Received	

== Miscellaneous awards ==
=== Annie Awards ===
Year	Category	Nominated work	Result	Ref.
1995	Outstanding Achievement for Music in an Animated Feature Production	Pocahontas	Won	
1996	Outstanding Achievement for Music in an Animated Feature Production	The Hunchback of Notre Dame	Nominated	

=== The Astra Awards ===
Year	Category	Nominated work	Result	Ref.
2024	Best Original Score	Wicked	Nominated	
2025	Best Original Song	"The Girl in the Bubble" (from Wicked: For Good)	Nominated	
2025	Best Original Song	"No Place Like Home" (from Wicked: For Good)	Nominated	

=== Chicago Film Critics Association Awards ===
Year	Category	Nominated work	Result	Ref.
2024	Best Original Score	Wicked	Nominated	

=== Critics' Choice Movie Awards ===
Year	Category	Nominated work	Result	Ref.
1998	Best Song	"When You Believe" (from The Prince of Egypt)	Won	
2007	Best Song	"That's How You Know" (from Enchanted)	Nominated	
2025	Best Song	"The Girl in the Bubble" (from Wicked: For Good)	Nominated	

=== Drama Desk Awards ===
Year	Category	Nominated work	Result	Ref.
1971	Most Promising Composer	Godspell	Won	
1971	Most Promising Lyricist	Godspell	Won	
1978	Outstanding Musical	Working	Nominated	
1978	Outstanding Director of a Musical	Working	Nominated	
1986	Outstanding Musical	Personals	Nominated	
2004	Outstanding Musical	Wicked	Nominated	
2004	Outstanding Music	Wicked	Nominated	
2004	Outstanding Lyrics	Wicked	Won	

=== Gold Derby Awards ===
Year	Category	Nominated work	Result	Ref.
2007	Best Original Song	"Happy Working Song" (from Enchanted)	Nominated	
2007	Best Original Song	"That's How You Know" (from Enchanted)	Nominated	

=== Guild of Music Supervisors Awards ===
Year	Category	Result	Ref.
2024	Icon Award	Honored	

=== Hollywood Music in Media Awards ===
Year	Category	Nominated work	Result	Ref.
2025	Best Original Score – Feature Film	Wicked: For Good	Nominated	
2025	Best Original Song – Feature Film	"The Girl in the Bubble" (from Wicked: For Good)	Nominated	
2025	Best Original Song – Feature Film	"No Place Like Home" (from Wicked: For Good)	Nominated	

=== Houston Film Critics Society Awards ===
Year	Category	Nominated work	Result	Ref.
2007	Best Original Song	"Happy Working Song" (from Enchanted)	Nominated	

=== International Film Music Critics Association Awards ===
Year	Category	Nominated work	Result	Ref.
2024	Best Original Score for a Fantasy/Science Fiction Film	Wicked	Won	
2025	Best Original Score for a Fantasy/Science Fiction Film	Wicked: For Good	Nominated	

=== Minnesota Film Critics Alliance Awards ===
Year	Category	Nominated work	Result	Ref.
2024	Best Music	Wicked	Nominated	

=== New York Film Critics Online Awards ===
Year	Category	Nominated work	Result	Ref.
2024	Best Use of Music	Wicked	Runner-up	

=== Online Film & Television Association Awards ===
Year	Category	Nominated work	Result	Ref.
1996	Best Score	The Hunchback of Notre Dame	Nominated	
1996	Best Original Song	"Someday" (from The Hunchback of Notre Dame)	Nominated	
1998	Best Family Score	The Prince of Egypt	Won	
1998	Best Original Song	"Deliver Us" (from The Prince of Egypt)	Nominated	
1998	Best Original Song	"When You Believe" (from The Prince of Egypt)	Nominated	
2007	Best Original Song	"That's How You Know" (from Enchanted)	Nominated	
2024	Best Adapted Song	"Defying Gravity" (from Wicked)	Won	
2025	Best Original Song	"The Girl in the Bubble" (from Wicked: For Good)	Nominated	
2025	Best Original Song	"No Place Like Home" (from Wicked: For Good)	Nominated	
2025	Best Adapted Song	"As Long as You're Mine" (from Wicked: For Good)	Nominated	
2025	Best Adapted Song	"For Good" (from Wicked: For Good)	Runner-up	
2025	Best Adapted Song	"No Good Deed" (from Wicked: For Good)	Nominated	

=== Outer Critics Circle Awards ===
Year	Category	Nominated work	Result	Ref.
2004	Outstanding Broadway Musical	Wicked	Won	

=== San Diego Film Critics Society Awards ===
Year	Category	Nominated work	Result	Ref.
2024	Best Use of Music	Wicked	Nominated	

=== Satellite Awards ===
Year	Category	Nominated work	Result	Ref.
1998	Best Original Song	"When You Believe" (from The Prince of Egypt)	Nominated	
2025	Best Original Song	"The Girl in the Bubble" (from Wicked: For Good)	Nominated	
2025	Best Original Song	"No Place Like Home" (from Wicked: For Good)	Nominated	

=== Society of Composers & Lyricists Awards ===
Year	Category	Nominated work	Result	Ref.
2024	Outstanding Original Score for a Studio Film	Wicked	Nominated	
2025	Outstanding Original Score for a Studio Film	Wicked: For Good	Nominated	
2025	Outstanding Original Song for a Comedy or Musical Visual Media Production	"The Girl in the Bubble" (from Wicked: For Good)	Nominated	
2025	Outstanding Original Song for a Comedy or Musical Visual Media Production	"No Place Like Home" (from Wicked: For Good)	Nominated	
2025	Lifetime Achievement Award	—N/a	Honored	

=== World Soundtrack Awards ===
Year	Category	Nominated work	Result	Ref.
2026	Best Original Song	"No Place Like Home" (from Wicked: For Good)	Nominated	

== Special honors ==
=== American Theater Hall of Fame ===
Year	Honor	Result	Ref.
2009	American Theater Hall of Fame	Inducted	

=== Hollywood Walk of Fame ===
Year	Honor	Result	Ref.
2008	Hollywood Walk of Fame	Inducted	

=== Songwriters Hall of Fame ===
Year	Honor	Result	Ref.
2009	Songwriters Hall of Fame	Inducted	

== Other honors ==
- Schwartz received an Honorary Doctor of Fine Arts degree from Carnegie Mellon University in May 2015.
