= The Girl in the Bubble =

Promotional single by Ariana Grande

from the album Wicked: For Good – The Soundtrack
- A-side: "No Place Like Home"
- Released: March 20, 2026
- Length: 3:40
- Label: Republic; Verve
- Songwriter: Stephen Schwartz
- Producers: Greg Wells; Stephen Oremus; Stephen Schwartz

Ariana Grande promotional singles chronology
"A Wicked Good Finale" (2025)	"The Girl in the Bubble" (2026)

Lyric video
- "The Girl in the Bubble" on YouTube

"The Girl in the Bubble" is a song by American singer and actress Ariana Grande from the soundtrack to the 2025 film Wicked: For Good, the second part of Universal Pictures' two-part film adaptation of the musical Wicked. It was released as part of the soundtrack on November 21, 2025, through Republic Records and Verve Records. Composed by Stephen Schwartz, it is an original track created for the film that was performed by Grande in her role as Glinda. The song was nominated for Best Song at the 31st Critics' Choice Awards and Best Original Song alongside "No Place Like Home" at 83rd Golden Globes.

== Background and release ==
In November 2022, Wicked composer Stephen Schwartz revealed that the second part of the film adaptation would feature two new songs "to meet the demands of the storytelling". He shared in December 2023 that he wrote the two songs exclusively for the film as "the storytelling required it", with the intention that "they were organic and not imposed on the movie." In September 2025, the title of the original songs were revealed to be "No Place Like Home," performed by Cynthia Erivo as Elphaba, and "The Girl in the Bubble," performed by Ariana Grande as Glinda.

The first sneak peek of the new songs featured in a teaser trailer for the film released on October 8, including a few bars of Grande's song. A teaser for "The Girl in the Bubble" with a longer 30-second snippet dropped on November 6, a few weeks ahead of the film premiere. The full song was released for digital download and streaming as part of the soundtrack album Wicked: For Good – The Soundtrack on November 21 by Republic Records and Verve Records. A 7-inch vinyl of "No Place Like Home" with "The Girl in the Bubble" as the B-side was released through Urban Outfitters on the same day.

== Development and filming ==
"The Girl in the Bubble" was envisioned following the decision to flesh out the second act of the musical Wicked into its own feature film, which allowed for the depiction of character beats that took place offstage in the original Broadway version. The film adaptation's director Jon M. Chu stated the reasoning was not to gain Oscar nominations but rather "to go deeper with understanding where Elphaba and Glinda are during their journey." Chu realized that the film needed to explore the characters' inner lives in ways that dialogue alone couldn't, necessitating new songs. He explained that with the two-part adaptation there "was both more time to explore the two characters' motivations and a new recognition that Glinda has the bigger arc in 'For Good' than even Elphaba, which made the need for a new song evident." Stephen Schwartz, the original musical's composer, immediately volunteered to write two songs to explore Elphaba and Glinda's character arcs.

"The Girl in the Bubble" was the first new song written by Schwartz, who stated "I did write that pretty quickly." The film features imagery of Glinda traveling around in a bubble, an homage to the 1939 film The Wizard of Oz. This inspired the song's titular metaphor of Glinda being stuck in a bubble. When composing the song, Schwartz kept the melody simple and "almost folklike" to allow for Grande's stripped-down performance. In the song, the singer avoids her usual vocal frills and sings quietly. Chu stated that "You can hear it's not the perfect note from Ariana Grande that it usually is. She struggles to pull it out," as she was sick on the day of filming the song.

The screenplay's writers Dana Fox and Winnie Holzman experimented with where the song would go in the script. Fox stated that the position of the song changed its meaning from Glinda talking about her feelings to her actually making a decision and they wanted to ensure "it felt like it was motivating her to do something different, instead of just, 'Oh I'm sad I'm the girl in the bubble.'" The placement of the song continued to change even in post-production. According to the film's editor Myron Kerstein, the number was initially placed during editing following a conversation between Glinda and Madame Morrible. However, they decided to move the song up, changing the context from her reacting to Morrible to her seeing the "March of the Witch Hunters" instead.

== Composition and lyrics ==
"It's very clear what Glinda's going through there. It's obviously the turning point for the character—what she's wrestling with in terms of what her life has been, which has been very easy up until now, and her decision to give up a lot of what she thought she wanted. Because she's actually quite a good person, even though she doesn't quite know it yet. She simply can't live the way she has been living, even though it's very comfortable. Then, of course, because she's a character that floats around in this bubble—think about what that means. You're insulated from everything else. We have the term, “living in a bubble,” and you're floating above whatever turmoil and difficulties are going on down below in the real world. She realizes that, even though it's an easier way to live, it's not a way that her soul will allow her to live anymore."

— Stephen Schwartz, speaking to Elle

"The Girl in the Bubble" is the penultimate song of Wicked: For Good and comes after Glinda "the Good Witch" watches an angry mob of people gather outside the Wizard of Oz's castle to hunt down her old friend Elphaba, now dubbed the "Wicked Witch of the West" by the Wizard's propaganda. The song marks a turning point for Glinda's character and signals an evolution from her popularity-obsessed persona into genuinely earning the moniker "Good". Earlier in the film, she was gifted by Madame Morrible a giant pink bubble, a mechanical invention to travel around without the need for magic. The title of the song references the bubble Glinda travels in and uses that as a metaphor for her privileged life, floating above the people of Oz. In the number, watching how far the mob is willing to go to destroy Elphaba forces Glinda to grapple with her part in the Wizard's regime and realize that she can no longer take part in it. According to Chu, "Glinda is the one that has to ultimately pop her own bubble. She has to leave her privilege to actually see other people's struggles and fight for justice and equality."

The song momentously depicts the moment Glinda "earns her title for real" and decides "I'm going to change the course of Oz. I'm going to become deeply, truly good and make a safe space for people," as Grande put it. She added that it shows the character making the "choice to begin the chapter of being truly good. Not performing goodness, not... a façade of goodness but to put down the wand, and actually become truly good." Schwartz similarly expressed that "Glinda reaches a point of crisis where she just cannot continue to live the way she has been. She has been insulated from what is really going on, cutting off her own morality and sense of decency in order to have the trappings of what she thinks she wants. Finally, there is a moment where she must confront this, and it felt essential that we take the time to have a song in which to do that."

== Critical reception ==
Melissa Ruggieri of USA Today ranked "The Girl in the Bubble" seventh in her ranking of the eleven songs from the soundtrack album, calling it "sweet, if empty" and remarking on how "the pillow of waltzing strings sweep luxuriously as Grande's voice takes on the wide-eyed wonder she frequently projects on red carpets and in morning show interviews". In a ranking of songs from both films, Stephen Daw of Billboard placed the track at number 16, expressing disappointment at "another plaintive ballad" that slows down the momentum of the plot.

== Accolades ==
Awards and nominations for "The Girl in the Bubble"
Organization	Year	Category	Result	Ref.
Hollywood Music in Media Awards	2025	Song – Feature Film	Nominated	
Astra Creative Arts Awards	2026	Best Original Song	Nominated	
Critics' Choice Awards	2026	Best Song	Nominated	
Golden Globe Awards	2026	Best Original Song	Nominated	
Society of Composers & Lyricists	2026	Outstanding Original Song for a Comedy or Musical Visual Media Production	Nominated	
Iowa Film Critics Associacion	2025	Best Original Song	Won	

== Charts ==
Chart performance for "The Girl in the Bubble"
Chart (2025)	Peak position
New Zealand Hot Singles (RMNZ)	11
UK Singles Sales (OCC)	12
UK Physical Singles (OCC)	3
US Billboard Hot 100	100
