= 7th Society of Composers & Lyricists Awards =

Awards ceremony for music in 2025 productions

- Date: February 6, 2026
- Location: Skirball Cultural Center, Los Angeles, California
- Hosted by: Kevin Bacon; Michael Bacon
- Website: thescl.com

The 7th Society of Composers & Lyricists Awards recognized the best in music in films, television productions and interactive media of 2025. The ceremony was held on February 6, 2026, at the Skirball Cultural Center in Los Angeles, California, with American actor Kevin Bacon and American musician Michael Bacon serving as hosts.

The nominees were announced on December 17, 2025. Ryan Coogler's supernatural horror film Sinners and Jon M. Chu's musical fantasy film Wicked: For Good led the nominations with three each. Stephen Schwartz and Ludwig Göransson were the most nominated individuales with three each.

American composers Stephen Schwartz and Charles Fox were presented with the Lifetime Achievement Award; Italian composer Ennio Morricone and American singer Peggy Lee were inducted into society's Hall of Fame; American songwriters Sara Bareilles and Steve Dorff were honored with the Ambassador Award and the Trailblazer Award, respectively; and American politician Marsha Blackburn received a special recognition for Excellence in Advocacy.

== Winners and nominees ==
Winners are listed first and in bold.

=== Score ===
Outstanding Original Score for a Studio Film	Outstanding Original Score for an Independent Film
**Sinners – Ludwig Göransson**; Bugonia – Jerskin Fendrix; Frankenstein – Alexandre Desplat; Hamnet – Max Richter; One Battle After Another – Jonny Greenwood; Wicked: For Good – Stephen Schwartz and John Powell	**Train Dreams – Bryce Dessner**; Eternity – David Fleming; Out of the Nest – Fabrizio Mancinelli; Rental Family – Jónsi and Alex Somers; Straw – Dara Taylor; To Kill a Wolf – Sara Barone and Forest Christenson
Outstanding Original Score for a Television Production	Outstanding Original Title Sequence for a Television Production
**Severance – Theodore Shapiro**; Andor – Brandon Roberts; The Last of Us – David Fleming and Gustavo Santaolalla; Pluribus – Dave Porter; The Studio – Antonio Sánchez; The White Lotus – Cristobal Tapia de Veer	**The White Lotus – Cristobal Tapia de Veer**; All Her Fault – Jeff Beal; The Beast in Me – Sean Callery; Dept. Q – Carlos Rafael Rivera; Murderbot – Amanda Jones; Pluribus – Dave Porter
Outstanding Original Score for Interactive Media	David Raksin Award for Emerging Talent
**Sword of the Sea – Austin Wintory**; Indiana Jones and the Great Circle: The Order of Giants – Gordy Haab; Star Wars Outlaws: A Pirate's Fortune – Wilbert Roget II, Cody Matthew Johnson, and Jon Everist; Wildgate – Maclaine Diemer	**Laws of Man – Ching-Shan Chang**; Dr. Seuss's The Sneetches – Greg Nicolett; The Map That Leads to You – Sara Trevino; A Nice Indian Boy – Raashi Kulkarni; Ride or Die – Freya Berkhout; Washington Black – Cameron Moody

=== Song ===
Outstanding Original Song for a Dramatic or Documentary Visual Media Production	Outstanding Original Song for a Comedy or Musical Visual Media Production
**"I Lied to You" from Sinners – Raphael Saadiq and Ludwig Göransson**; "Dear Me" from Diane Warren: Relentless – Diane Warren; "Drive" from F1 – Ed Sheeran, Blake Slatkin, and John Mayer; "The Hills of Tanchico" from The Wheel of Time – Nikhil Koparkar and Rammy Park; "Last Time (I Seen the Sun)" from Sinners – Alice Smith, Miles Caton, and Ludwig Göransson; "Salt Then Sour Then Sweet" from Come See Me in the Good Light – Sara Bareilles, Brandi Carlile, and Andrea Gibson	**"Golden" from KPop Demon Hunters – Ejae and Mark Sonnenblick**; "The Girl in the Bubble" from Wicked: For Good – Stephen Schwartz; "I Feel Alive" from A Minecraft Movie – Mark Ronson, Andrew Wyatt, and Jack Black; "No Place Like Home" from Wicked: For Good – Stephen Schwartz; "Steve's Lava Chicken" from A Minecraft Movie – Jack Black and Jared Hess; "Zoo" from Zootopia 2 – Blake Slatkin, Shakira, and Ed Sheeran
