= Pippin (original cast recording) =

Pippin – Original Cast Album
- Decca Broadway CD reissue cover

Cast recording by various artists
- Released: 1972
- Label: Motown

Pippin, subtitled Original Cast Album and Original Cast Recording, is an album containing a recording of the musical Pippin made by its original 1972 Broadway cast. The album was released in the same year by Motown.

== Background ==
The album was produced by Phil Ramone and the musical's composer and lyricist Stephen Schwartz.

== Critical reception ==
Professional ratings
Review scores
Source	Rating
AllMusic	3.5/5 stars

In a contemporary review for AllMusic, William Ruhlmann notes that "the cast album [was] Motown's first venture into show music" and it "spent two and a half months in the charts, the only cast album to reach the charts at all in 1973" and continues: "It deserved to do even better. Schwartz's piano- and guitar-based melodies were as catchy and appealing as any of the soft rock that was dominating the charts in the early '70s, and the cast was accomplished, especially Vereen, and, in "No Time at All," a spry ode to senior citizenship, Irene Ryan, best known as Granny Clampett on the television series The Beverly Hillbillies."

== Chart performance ==
The album spent 10 weeks on the Billboard Top LPs & Tapes chart, peaking at number 129.

Moreover, two songs from the album made Billboard's pop and/or soul charts as covered by Motown's artists: "I Guess I'll Miss the Man" (The Supremes) and "Corner of the Sky" (Jackson 5).

== Track listing ==
LP – Motown M760L

All lyrics are written by Stephen Schwartz; all music is composed by Stephen Schwartz.

Side 1
No.	Title	Artist(s)	Length
1.	"Magic to Do"	Ben Vereen and The Players	4:20
2.	"Corner of the Sky"	John Rubinstein	3:16
3.	"War Is a Science"	Eric Berry, John Rubinstein, and Soldiers	4:36
4.	"Glory"	Ben Vereen and Soldiers	4:31
5.	"Simple Joys"	Ben Vereen	2:54
6.	"No Time at All"	Irene Ryan and The Gang	4:40
7.	"With You"	John Rubinstein	2:36

Side 2
No.	Title	Artist(s)	Length
1.	"Spread a Little Sunshine"	Leland Palmer	3:00
2.	"Morning Glow"	John Rubinstein and Chorus	2:51
3.	"On the Right Track"	Ben Vereen, John Rubinstein	3:32
4.	"Kind of Woman"	Jill Clayburgh and Girls	2:19
5.	"Extraordinary"	John Rubinstein	2:32
6.	"Love Song"	John Rubinstein, Jill Clayburgh	2:32
7.	"I Guess I'll Miss the Man"	Jill Clayburgh	2:09
8.	"Finale"	The Players	6:13

=== 2000 CD reissue with bonus tracks ===
On September 26, 2000, the album was reissued on CD, with bonus tracks, by Decca Broadway.

== Charts ==
Chart (1973)	Peak position
US Billboard Top LPs & Tapes	129

== Awards ==
Year	Award type	Categories	Results	Ref.
1974	Grammy Awards	Best Score from the Original Cast Show Album	Nominated	
