= Captain Louie =

Family musical premiered in late 1980s

- Music: Stephen Schwartz
- Lyrics: Stephen Schwartz
- Book: Anthony Stein
- Basis: The Trip by Ezra Jack Keats
- Productions: 1983 New York; 2005 Off-Broadway; 2006 US Tour

Captain Louie is a family musical with music and lyrics by Stephen Schwartz and a book by Anthony Stein adapted from the children's book The Trip by Ezra Jack Keats. It is the story of a young boy from the inner city whose family moves to a new neighborhood, forcing him to leave his old friends behind. On Halloween night, he escapes into his imagination to cope with the loneliness he feels.

The musical premiered in the late 1980s and then played Off-Broadway in 2005. Since then, it has had a U.S. tour and other productions.

== Background ==
Captain Louie has had a lengthy genesis. In the 1980s, Meridee Stein, the founder and artistic director of the First All Children's Theater, brought to Schwartz the idea of adapting Keats' book with her husband Anthony. Schwartz wrote the score while working on Rags (1986). The 35-minute show premiered as The Trip, in a theater on West 65th Street in New York, and played for a limited run by the First Children's Theatre. Keats designed the sets and costumes.

In 2005, Stein and Schwartz expanded the musical to 65-minutes after various workshops. It played Off-Broadway at the York Theatre Company in 2005 with Meridee Stein again directing. A world premier recording of this version of the production was made prior to the official opening which does not include subsequent performances of new cast members added after the final workshop. Later in 2005, it played at the Little Shubert Theatre. In 2006-2007 the musical toured in the U.S. At the MTI Junior Theatre Festival 2009 the songs, "New Kid in The Neighborhood", "Trick or Treat", and "Captain Louie" were performed by Starstruck Performing Arts Center and was directed by Jennifer Jones and choreographed by Elizebeth Casalini. Peter Jones was the musical director.

== Synopsis ==
Louie is lonely because his family has moved to a new neighborhood ("New Kid in the Neighborhood"). Playing with his toy airplane, Red, Louie decides to travel to his old neighborhood. He makes a diorama out of a shoebox. Looking into it through the purple cellophane, he imagines that he and Red are on their way ("Big Red Plane"). A sinister gang, consisting of a broom, flower, monster and mouse, plan to trick Louie ("We've Got a Welcome for Louie"). He arrives in his old neighborhood, but it is deserted and dark; his friends do not answer him when he calls. A whistle shrieks, and dark shapes chase Louie ("Shadows"). The gang of creatures drag Louie to their hideaway. Louie is frightened, but he eventually realizes that the creatures are Louie's old friends in Halloween costumes. Everyone celebrates Captain Louie's return ("Trick or Treat").

Julio, a new kid, meets everyone. As they are all about to go trick-or-treating, one of the gang, Ziggy, observes that someone has moved into Louie's old house. The indignant kids decide to "trick" the new occupant of Louie's house ("Looza on the Block"). But it turns out that the new occupant is Julio. Then, the group insists on going to Ziggy's house. It is in a disinvested neighborhood, and Ziggy is embarrassed because his family is too poor to buy Halloween decorations and candy. Louie suggests that the kids help Ziggy to decorate his house ("Spiffin' Up Ziggy's"). Louie eventually suggests that the group go trick-or-treating by plane ("Captain Louie"). Soon, it is time for Louie to leave, and he says goodbye to his friends ("Home Again"). He arrives back in his new neighborhood, gathers his courage and dresses as "Captain Louie" in his Red airplane. Louie's Halloween costume is popular in his new neighborhood, and he makes new friends ("Finale: New Kid In The Neighborhood, Reprise").

== Musical numbers ==
- New Kid in the Neighborhood
- Big Red Plane
- A Welcome for Louie
- Shadows
- Trick or Treat
- Looza on the Block
- Spiffin' Up Ziggy's
- Captain Louie
- Home Again
- Finale
