= No Place Like Home (Cynthia Erivo song) =

Promotional single by Cynthia Erivo

from the album Wicked: For Good – The Soundtrack
- B-side: "The Girl in the Bubble"
- Released: November 21, 2025
- Length: 3:51
- Label: Republic; Verve
- Songwriter: Stephen Schwartz
- Producers: Greg Wells; Stephen Oremus; Stephen Schwartz

Lyric video
- "No Place Like Home" on YouTube

"No Place Like Home" is a song by English actress Cynthia Erivo from the soundtrack to the 2025 film Wicked: For Good, the second part of Universal Pictures's two-part film adaptation of the musical Wicked. It was released as part of the soundtrack on November 21, 2025, through Republic Records and Verve Records. Composed by Stephen Schwartz, it is an original track created for the film that was performed by Erivo in her role as Elphaba. It was nominated for Best Original Song at the 83rd Golden Globe Awards, and also received a nomination for Best Song Written for Visual Media at the 69th Annual Grammy Awards.

== Background and release ==
In November 2022, Wicked composer Stephen Schwartz revealed that the second part of the film adaptation would feature two new songs "to meet the demands of the storytelling". He shared in December 2023 that he wrote the two songs exclusively for the film as "the storytelling required it", with the intention that "they were organic and not imposed on the movie." In September 2025, the title of the original songs were revealed to be "No Place Like Home," performed by Cynthia Erivo as Elphaba, and "The Girl in the Bubble," performed by Ariana Grande as Glinda.

The first sneak peek of the new songs featured in a teaser trailer for the film released on October 8, including Erivo singing the titular line. A teaser for "No Place Like Home" with a longer 30-second snippet dropped on November 6, a few weeks ahead of the film premiere. The full song was released as part of the soundtrack album Wicked: For Good – The Soundtrack on November 21 by Republic Records and Verve Records. A 7-inch vinyl of the song and "The Girl in the Bubble" was made available through Urban Outfitters on the same day.

== Development and filming ==
"No Place Like Home" was envisioned following the decision to flesh out the second act of the musical Wicked into its own feature film, which allowed for the depiction of character beats that took place offstage in the original Broadway version. The film adaptation's director Jon M. Chu stated the reasoning was not to gain Oscar nominations but rather "to go deeper with understanding where Elphaba and Glinda are during their journey." Chu realized that the film needed to explore the characters' inner lives in ways that dialogue alone couldn't, necessitating new songs. Stephen Schwartz, the original musical's composer, immediately volunteered to write two songs to explore Elphaba and Glinda's character arcs.

The sequence that included “No Place Like Home”, in which Elphaba tries to convince a group of Animals fleeing Oz to stay, went through a long development process. The song went through various iterations, with Schwartz stating it initially "encompassed more of the storytelling than it does now. There are things that we're seeing where she's not singing, but it was originally at one point part of the song." Its title is a reference to Dorothy Gale's declaration that there is "no place like home" in the 1939 film The Wizard of Oz. Schwartz said he had long hoped to write a song named "No Place Like Home" and connect the phrase to Elphaba when writing the musical. He and the film's screenplay writers Dana Fox and Winnie Holzman emphasized Elphaba's love for Oz in the song to give the film's ending more impact, explaining "Elphaba makes an enormous sacrifice at the end out of love for Oz to try to make things right in Oz in the only way she realizes is possible. Winnie and I and the team felt that it was really important from a storytelling and emotional point of view to understand how much Elphaba actually loved her homeland."

In composing the track, Schwartz aimed to channel the "soulfulness" and the "ferocity" in Erivo's voice with its "contemplative" tones at the start and the "more militant" sounds emerging later. Lyrically, the song was inspired by real-world analogues about choosing to stay in the United States despite feeling like you don't belong. To Schwartz, the song "felt to me like what Elphaba would say whether she was in Oz or whether she was in America in our current situation. She would take action. She would try to get allies to help her with her resistance." The message resonated for Chu as the son of immigrants and he discussed it in depth with Erivo, saying "We talked for hours about what it means to be in America and to be someone like her." Schwartz consulted with Erivo to ensure that the song felt relevant not just to the Animals but to Elphaba as well. Erivo stated, "The song in its original form was really beautiful, but he and I discussed making it connect to what she was actually going through. Before, it was sort of like a grand platitude to everyone, but it needed to really connect with her and her experience as well. So there were some lyric shifts and changes just to make it feel really human, because I think in the specificity, it then connects with everybody else as well." She also requested changes to the lyrics to simplify some wordier elements into more simple one syllable words, which Schwartz complied in order to accommodate her vocal performance. According to the actress, "the entire crew was in tears" when the sequence was filmed.

== Composition and lyrics ==
"We're all living in a country that is not the America we lived in 10 years ago. Whether you like it better or you don't like it as well, there's no denying that our country is changing around us, and we are not the only nation on Earth that that's happening to. And so the question is, if it's not the direction you want your country to go in, what do you do? Do you actually try and resist, which is dangerous and has very little chance of success? Or do you just give up and be like, 'Okay, well, I'm out of here.' So I felt that in addition to Elphaba and the story, it has a lot of resonance for us in the world we live in, especially living in America right now."

— Stephen Schwartz, at a soundtrack listening session in New York

Titled after Dorothy's iconic line in The Wizard of Oz (1939), "No Place Like Home" comes near the start of Wicked: For Good as Elphaba encounters a group of Animals on the yellow brick road in the midst of escaping Oz to avoid persecution by the tyrannical Wizard of Oz. Surrounded by the Animals she swore to help, including her childhood nanny Dulcibear, Elphaba breaks into song about why she's fighting to save Oz and implores the Animals to stay and fight with her, before the Cowardly Lion shows himself in Elphaba's front and start talking about the monkeys as spies. The song revolves around "Elphaba's dedication to protecting Oz, even as she faces rejection from everyone around her," as Grande put it. According to Chu, the song explores the Animals' thoughts of "What is home? And what happens when you are fighting for a home that you realize doesn't even want you there, or was never meant for you? Do you defend it? Do you fight for it? Does anyone else think of home the same as you?", questions which in turn are "very interesting and relevant to Elphaba's journey."

The song emphasizes Elphaba's love for her homeland, as Schwartz stated: "Although it has not been very good to her, it is her home, and all of her heart and soul wants to stay there, fight for it, and make it a better place. When you are born somewhere, that place becomes part of you, and you cannot really explain why. That is a universal feeling, and I tried to capture that in this song." This also paralleled real-life sentiments about the United States, as Schwartz explained to fans in a soundtrack listening session. Fox argued that the song is a "beautiful anthem" that held a powerful meaning in the context of contemporary events as "the idea that, how do you love a place that doesn't seem to love you back, feels so deep and profound right now. That's tough to watch right now." At the end, the anthem fails to convince the Animals to stay, adding to the heartbreak according to Fox: "She can't convince them. The truth is they're probably right to leave. At that moment, they are doing what's best for them, what is the safest choice for them."

== Critical reception ==
Of the eleven songs on the soundtrack album, Melissa Ruggieri ranked "No Place Like Home" number five, calling it the stronger of the two new songs. While she said "the song wallows in mediocrity", she praised Erivo's vocal performance. In a ranking of songs from both films, Stephen Daw of Billboard placed the track at number 14, feeling it was underwhelming. In a similar list, Louis Peitzman of Vulture placed the song at number 16, describing it "simply not very good" and criticizing its lyrics as "all banal platitudes".

== Accolades ==
Awards and nominations for "No Place Like Home"
Organization	Year	Category	Result	Ref.
Hollywood Music in Media Awards	2025	Song – Feature Film	Nominated	
Astra Creative Arts Awards	2026	Best Original Song	Nominated	
Golden Globe Awards	2026	Best Original Song	Nominated	
Society of Composers & Lyricists	2026	Outstanding Original Song for a Comedy or Musical Visual Media Production	Nominated	
Grammy Awards	2027	Best Song Written for Visual Media	Pending	

== Charts ==
Chart performance for "No Place Like Home"
Chart (2025–2026)	Peak position
UK Singles Sales (OCC)	92
US Bubbling Under Hot 100 (Billboard)	12

== Release history ==
Release dates and formats for "No Place Like Home"
Region	Date	Format	Label	Ref.
Various	November 21, 2025	7-inch vinyl	Republic	
