= Madame Morrible =

Fictional character from Wicked

- The Wicked Years character
- Michelle Yeoh as Morrible in Wicked (2024).
- First appearance: Wicked: The Life and Times of the Wicked Witch of the West (1995)
- Last appearance: Wicked: For Good (2025)
- Created by: Gregory Maguire
- Portrayed by: Musical: Carole Shelley; Rue McClanahan; Carol Kane; Sheryl Lee Ralph; Others (see below); Films: Michelle Yeoh

In-universe information
- Nickname: Horrible Morrible
- Species: Human
- Gender: Female
- Occupation: Headmistress of Shiz University (novel and musical); Dean of Sorcery Studies (films)
- Affiliation: Wizard of Oz
- Nationality: Gillikinese

Madame Muriel Morrible is a fictional character and one of the primary antagonists in author Gregory Maguire's 1995 novel Wicked: The Life and Times of the Wicked Witch of the West. She also appears in the Broadway musical Wicked, which is loosely based on Maguire's novel, and in the musical's two-part film adaptation, Wicked (2024) and Wicked: For Good (2025). She is the headmistress of Crage Hall at Shiz University, and a colleague of The Wizard of Oz. Morrible is an experienced sorceress, and teaches a sorcery seminar at Shiz.

== In the novel ==
In the novel, Madame Morrible is described as a "fish faced Gillikinese woman", and uses Shiz to recruit young girls as soldiers and spies for the Wizard, though she does not directly influence him. Madame Morrible believes that Animals (i.e. sentient animals) should be "seen and not heard", which she states at a poetry reading, known as a 'Quell'. She often has a Tik-Tok machine man called Grommetik to do her bidding, and later commands this creature to kill the Goat scientist Doctor Dillamond, which Ama Clutch—Galinda's chaperone—witnesses. Following the murder, Ama Clutch loses her grip on reality and begins to talk to inanimate objects as though they are people, a condition which gradually deteriorates until it results in her death. Galinda had previously lied to Madame Morrible by telling her that Ama Clutch was prone to fits of delirium whose symptoms included such hallucinations; since she had told no one else this lie, it is strongly implied that the condition was the result of a spell placed upon Ama Clutch by Morrible to prevent her from revealing the truth about Doctor Dillamond's murder.

At the funeral of Ama Clutch, Madame Morrible suggests to Nessarose, Elphaba and Glinda that the three become the "Adepts" of Quadling Country, Munchkinland and Gillikin respectively. This would grant them political dominion over these areas, but, as Morrible admits, is in fact a way of maintaining the Wizard's authority in far-flung regions of Oz. They all reject the idea, however each girl does ultimately find herself the ruler of a region in Oz: Nessarose becomes the Eminence of the East (a.k.a. "Wicked Witch of the East"), Elphaba rules the Vinkus as the "Wicked Witch of the West", and Glinda rules Gillikin as the Good Witch of the North. Later in the novel, Elphaba speculates that Madame Morrible was a witch, and may somehow have influenced events to bring the three to power despite their original refusal. The theory of Morrible's having magical powers is indeed probably correct, as she successfully immobilized the three girls with a binding spell while speaking to them of their future as Adepts, as well as somehow making it impossible for them to discuss the matter afterward. She also claimed that her "special talent is to encourage talent", which may support the latter theory as well.

Throughout the novel, Elphaba stands by her belief that Madame Morrible was behind the death of Doctor Dillamond. While involved in a resistance movement against the Wizard, Elphaba is assigned to assassinate Madame Morrible, who is staying in the Emerald City. However, Morrible surrounds herself with children, and Elphaba is forced to abandon her plan to avoid harming innocent bystanders. Toward the end of the story, Elphaba goes to Shiz and tries to kill Madame Morrible by bashing her head in with a marble trophy, but is five minutes too late, and ends up merely assaulting the woman's corpse (though she later takes credit for having killed her).

== In the musical ==
In the musical, Madame Morrible plays a bigger role as the antagonist. She discovers Elphaba's talent for sorcery on the day the girl arrives at Shiz, and insists upon training her personally, as well as suggesting to the Wizard that she be brought before him with a view to making her his "magic Grand Vizier". At this audience, Madame Morrible tricks Elphaba into using her powers to create winged monkeys for the Wizard. When Elphaba realizes her mistake and flees, Madame Morrible spreads the rumor that she is a Wicked Witch, in order to turn the citizens of Oz against her. In contrast to the novel, she is explicitly shown to possess magical powers, being especially talented at controlling the weather. By use of this ability, she is later responsible for creating the cyclone that kills Nessarose (the Wicked Witch of the East) and brings Dorothy Gale into the Land of Oz. She is present when the Wizard sends witch-hunters to kill Elphaba, and dismisses Glinda's protests at this course of action, claiming that she knows Glinda harboured a desire for revenge after Elphaba ran off with Fiyero.

Since the musical is more oriented to younger audiences and families, Madame Morrible is not killed in that adaptation as she was in the original novel. Instead, Glinda orders the royal guards of Oz to take Madame Morrible to prison. Madame Morrible's costumes are very long and awkwardly shaped in the musical, as if to show her bizarre and unshaped personality.

The role was played in the original Broadway production by Carole Shelley.

Notable actresses besides Shelley to play the role include Rue McClanahan, Sheryl Lee Ralph, Carol Kane, Jayne Houdyshell, Miriam Margolyes, Rondi Reed, Alma Cuervo, Barbara Robertson, Susie Blake, Harriet Thorpe, Julie Legrand, Jo Anne Worley, Maggie Kirkpatrick, Patty Duke and Alexandra Billings.

== Film portrayal ==
Michelle Yeoh portrays Morrible in the musical's two-part film adaptation, Wicked (2024) and Wicked: For Good (2025). It is Yeoh's first musical film role and she was at first hesitant on taking on the character due to having not seen the musical, but then accepted the offer after being persuaded by director Jon M. Chu and the lead actresses Cynthia Erivo (who plays Elphaba) and Ariana Grande (who plays Glinda). In the films, Morrible's role at Shiz is changed from being the headmistress to its Dean of Sorcery Studies, with new character Miss Coddle (Keala Settle) as headmistress. She also is the one who enrolls Elphaba into Shiz after witnessing the latter's accidental use of her powers on campus.

Following the release of Wicked: For Good, Yeoh used the catchphrase "Madame Morrible, M.M., flip it around: Wicked Witch!" repeatedly during interviews, referencing how the initials "M.M." become "W.W." when turned upside down. Videos of the catchphrase circulated on the web, becoming a viral internet meme. Google added it as a Google Search Easter egg in December 2025.
