= Out of the Nest =

2024 animated film

- Thai: องครักษ์พิทักษ์เจี๊ยบ
- Directed by: Jeff Schu; Andrew Gordon; Veerapatra Jinanavin; Arturo A. Hernandez
- Screenplay by: Gillian Berrow; Arturo A. Hernandez
- Produced by: Chris Bremble; Keven Sun Zheyi; Ling Fang; Jwanwat Ahriyararomp
- Music by: Fabrizio Mancinelli
- Production companies: Riff Studio; Base FX
- Release date: 5 September 2024 (Thailand)
- Running time: 85 minutes
- Countries: Thailand; China
- Budget: >USD$10 million
- Box office: $1 million

Out of the Nest (Thai: องครักษ์พิทักษ์เจี๊ยบ) is a 2024 Thai-Chinese animated adventure film directed by Jeff Schu, Andrew Gordon, Veerapatra Jinanavin, and Arturo A. Hernandez and written by Hernandez.

== Production ==
Jeff Schu, Andrew Gordon, Veerapatra Jinanavin, and Arturo A. Hernandez co-directed the film and Hernandez wrote the film. Jinanavin graduated from the Academy of Art University and worked as an intern at Pixar, where he met Gordon in 2007. Jinanavin founded Riff Studio in Thailand in 2009, with three animators, but this grew to around 200 by 2025.

Chawalit Arayavarorm pitched Out of the Nest to Jinanavin in 2016. The idea was that seven royal fledgling birds with distinct personalities would be entrusted to a teenage goat delivery boy who dreams of becoming a barber. Riff Studio sought the help of Schu and Gordon to help fund the film. Gordon joined the production to help with storytelling, but became one of its directors. The film had a budget below USD$10 million.

Due to a lack of experience with computer animation in Thailand, work was outsourced to the Chinese company Base FX. Some elements of the film were censored by the China Film Administration.

== Release ==
Out of the Nest premiered in Thailand on 5 September 2024. In Turkey the film was shown in 121 theatres, the highest number of Turkish theatres that a Thai animated film has been shown in. It was released in the United States on 18 July 2025. It earned $1,062,814 during its theatrical release.

The film was shown at the Oulu International Children's and Youth Film Festival. It was shown at the 2024 Annecy International Animation Film Festival. All Rights Entertainment acquired the international sales rights for the film after it was shown at Annecy.

== Works cited ==
=== News ===
- ""องครักษ์พิทักษ์เจี๊ยบ" ผงาดติด 1 ใน 35 บนเวทีออสการ์". Khaosod. 26 November 2025. Archived from the original on 29 November 2025.
- "Thai animated film 'Out of the Nest' a hit in Singapore and Turkey". The Nation. 26 November 2024. Archived from the original on 14 June 2025.
- Frater, Patrick (14 June 2024). "Annecy: Thailand-China Animation 'Out of the Nest' Picked Up by All Rights Entertainment". Variety. Archived from the original on 29 November 2025.
- Giraud, Kévin (20 January 2025). "'Out Of The Nest': A Challenging Production Turns Into A Thai-Chinese Animated Hit". Cartoon Brew. Archived from the original on 29 November 2025.

=== Web ===
- "Out of the Nest (2024)". The Numbers.
- "Out of the Nest (2024)". Box Office Mojo.
