= Personals (musical) =

Musical revue

Personals is a musical revue with comic scenes and songs about people writing and responding to newspaper personal advertisements. It is written by David Crane, Seth Friedman and Marta Kauffman, with songs by William Dreskin, Joel Phillip Friedman, Seth Friedman, Alan Menken, Stephen Schwartz and Michael Skloff.

The revue was first performed Off-Broadway at the Minetta Lane Theater opening in November 1985 with a cast including Jason Alexander, Laura Dean, Dee Hoty, Jeff Keller, Nancy Opel and Trey Wilson. It was nominated for the 1986 Drama Desk Award for Outstanding Musical.
