= Wicked: For Good =

2025 film directed by Jon M. Chu

- Theatrical release poster
- Directed by: Jon M. Chu
- Screenplay by: Winnie Holzman (Note: Holzman is credited twice for writing the screenplay; first as a solo writer and as part of a writing team with Dana Fox.); Dana Fox
- Based on: Wicked by; Stephen Schwartz; Winnie Holzman; Wicked by Gregory Maguire
- Produced by: Marc Platt; David Stone
- Starring: Ariana Grande (Note: Per her own request, Grande is credited on-screen with her full name, Ariana Grande-Butera.); Cynthia Erivo; Jonathan Bailey; Ethan Slater; Bowen Yang; Michelle Yeoh; Jeff Goldblum
- Cinematography: Alice Brooks
- Edited by: Myron Kerstein
- Music by: John Powell; Stephen Schwartz
- Production companies: Universal Pictures; Marc Platt Productions
- Distributed by: Universal Pictures
- Release dates: November 4, 2025 (Suhai Music Hall); November 21, 2025 (United States)
- Running time: 137 minutes
- Country: United States
- Language: English
- Budget: $150 million
- Box office: $540.8 million

Wicked: For Good (also known as Wicked: Part Two (Note: The film was originally announced as Wicked: Part Two before being re-titled in December 2024, but the previous name is still used in some regions, stylized with either Arabic (Part 2) or Roman numerals (Part II).)) is a 2025 American musical fantasy film directed by Jon M. Chu and written by Winnie Holzman and Dana Fox. The sequel to Wicked (2024), it adapts the second act of the 2003 stage musical by Stephen Schwartz and Holzman, which was loosely based on Gregory Maguire's 1995 novel, a re-imagining of L. Frank Baum's 1900 novel The Wonderful Wizard of Oz and its 1939 film adaptation. Ariana Grande, Cynthia Erivo, Jonathan Bailey, Ethan Slater, Bowen Yang, Michelle Yeoh, and Jeff Goldblum reprise their roles from the first film. Set in the Land of Oz both before and during a retelling of the events of The Wonderful Wizard of Oz, the film follows Elphaba and Glinda in their new respective identities as the Wicked Witch of the West and Glinda the Good.

Universal Pictures and Marc Platt, who both produced the stage musical, announced the film adaptation in 2012. After a long development and multiple delays, partly due to the COVID-19 pandemic, Chu was hired to direct, with Erivo and Grande cast in 2021. The adaptation was split into two parts to avoid omitting plot points and further develop the characters. Principal photography on both films began in December 2022 in England, was interrupted in July 2023 by the 2023 SAG-AFTRA strike, and resumed and concluded in January 2024.

Wicked: For Good premiered at the Suhai Music Hall in São Paulo on November 4, 2025, and was released in the United States on November 21. It grossed $540 million on a $150 million budget, becoming the second-highest-grossing Oz film and musical film adaptation, both behind the first film. Both the National Board of Review and the American Film Institute listed it among the top-ten films of 2025, and it received several accolades, including nominations for five Golden Globe Awards and two British Academy Film Awards.

== Plot ==
Some time after defying the Wonderful Wizard of Oz, (Note: As depicted in Wicked (2024)) Elphaba Thropp, now branded the Wicked Witch of the West by Madame Morrible, continues fighting for Animal rights from a forest hideout. Meanwhile, Glinda Upland, now the Wizard's spokesperson, is engaged to Fiyero Tigelaar, Captain of the Gale Force. As Oz celebrates the grand opening of the Yellow Brick Road, Fiyero reveals that he is still searching for Elphaba, although Glinda insists that her former friend does not wish to be found. Fiyero showcases signs of withdrawal from their relationship.

Elphaba encounters several Animals fleeing Oz, including her former caretaker, Dulcibear, and encourages them to resist the Wizard’s oppression. However, the Cowardly Lion, whom Elphaba freed from captivity as a cub, blames her for exposing him to danger and revealing the Wizard's flying monkey spies. Elphaba later visits her sister, Nessarose, who has inherited their father's position as governor of Munchkinland. Nessarose forbids the Munchkins, including her servant Boq, from leaving without her permission. Hoping to help her sister, Elphaba enchants Nessarose's shoes, allowing her to fly. However, Boq decides to leave after learning about Glinda and Fiyero's upcoming wedding. Desperate to keep him, Nessarose attempts a love spell from the Grimmerie, but it backfires and shrinks his heart. Elphaba intervenes to save him, transforming him into a tin man.

Returning to the Emerald City, Elphaba agrees to meet the Wizard after Glinda persuades her, on the condition that the flying monkeys be freed. However, Chistery reveals that the Wizard has imprisoned several Animals, including Dr. Dillamond, who has lost his ability to speak. Realizing that the Wizard has no intention of changing his ways, Elphaba frees the prisoners, interrupting Glinda and Fiyero's wedding. Fiyero helps her escape and abandons his position to join her. Believing they are having an affair, Glinda angrily suggests that the Wizard and Morrible exploit Nessarose's situation to lure Elphaba into a trap.

At their hideout, Elphaba and Fiyero confess their love for each other. Fiyero suggests that she seek refuge at Kiamo Ko, an abandoned castle. Meanwhile, Morrible creates a tornado that carries a house from Kansas, crushing Nessarose. Glinda gives Nessarose's enchanted shoes to Dorothy Gale, the house's occupant, and directs her to the Wizard, promising that he can help her return home. When Elphaba confronts Glinda, the Gale Force arrives. Fiyero intervenes, threatening to kill Glinda to protect Elphaba. Glinda finally accepts that Fiyero truly loves Elphaba. The guards seize Fiyero and brutally beat him while Elphaba escapes with the monkeys to Kiamo Ko. Desperate to save him, she casts a spell to protect his life. Believing she has failed, she concludes that her attempts to do good have only caused suffering and decides to embrace her perceived wickedness.

Meanwhile, Dorothy, accompanied by Boq, the Cowardly Lion, and a scarecrow, meets the Wizard, who orders them to kill Elphaba and bring him her broom. Boq rallies the citizens of the Emerald City against her. Glinda confronts Morrible about the tornado, but Morrible refuses to accept responsibility. Realizing the danger Elphaba faces, Glinda rushes to Kiamo Ko to warn her. Elphaba captures Dorothy and imprisons her to retrieve Nessarose's shoes. When Glinda arrives, Chistery informs them that Fiyero appears to have died. Devastated, Elphaba decides to surrender, asking Glinda to conceal the truth from the people and entrusting her with the Grimmerie. The two friends share a tearful farewell. Glinda hides as Dorothy throws a bucket of water over Elphaba, who seemingly melts away.

After regaining his speech, Chistery gives Glinda a green elixir bottle belonging to Elphaba's mother. Glinda presents it to the Wizard, who realizes that he is Elphaba's biological father and that his elixir is connected to her magical powers. Ashamed of his actions, he leaves Oz at Glinda's demand. Glinda then orders the monkeys to arrest Morrible for her crimes. She reveals the truth to the people of Oz, restores the Animals' rights, and ensures they regain their voices. The Scarecrow is revealed to be Fiyero, transformed by Elphaba's spell to save his life. He returns to Kiamo Ko and discovers Elphaba hiding beneath a trapdoor, having faked her death to protect Glinda's reputation. Elphaba and Fiyero leave Oz through the surrounding desert while the Grimmerie opens for Glinda.

== Cast ==
- Ariana Grande as Galinda "Glinda" Upland, a charismatic young woman who is now known as Glinda the Good. (Note: Glinda's full identity is given as "Glinda the Good Witch of the North" in the script of the first film. It is not mentioned by that title in the film's dialogue and credits.)
  - Scarlett Spears as young Glinda
- Cynthia Erivo as Elphaba Thropp, a misunderstood young woman born with green skin who is now known as the Wicked Witch of the West.
- Jonathan Bailey as Fiyero Tigelaar, a Winkie prince who is now Captain of the Gale Force. He is later transformed into the Scarecrow by Elphaba.
- Ethan Slater as Boq Woodsman, a Munchkin who now works as Nessarose's servant. He is later transformed into the Tin Man by Elphaba.
- Bowen Yang as Pfannee, one of Glinda's college friends who now works as one of her assistants.
- Marissa Bode as Nessarose Thropp, Elphaba's paraplegic younger half-sister who is now Governor of Munchkinland and the self-proclaimed Wicked Witch of the East.
- Colman Domingo as the voice of the Cowardly Lion, a talking Lion who was saved by Fiyero and Elphaba as a cub in Wicked, and later befriends Dorothy Gale.
  - Omari Bernard was the movement artist for the Lion
- Michelle Yeoh as Madame Morrible, the former Dean of Sorcery at Shiz University, who is now the Press Secretary for the Wizard.
- Jeff Goldblum as the Wonderful Wizard of Oz, a conman masquerading as a "wizard", who rules Oz as a seemingly benevolent dictator. He is later revealed to be Elphaba's biological father.
- Bronwyn James as ShenShen, one of Glinda's college friends who now works as one of her assistants.
- Aaron Teoh as Avaric, Boq's friend and another one of Nessarose's servants.
- Sharon D. Clarke as the voice of Dulcibear, a talking Bear and former nanny to the Thropp family, who is among those departing Oz.
  - Madeline Wilson was the movement artist for Dulcibear
- Bethany Weaver as Dorothy Gale, a Kansas farm girl who is brought to Oz with her dog, Toto, by a tornado. Though the character's presence is more prominent than in the stage musical, her face is obscured to keep the focus on Glinda and Elphaba, save for a brief shot when Glinda sees her passing through a door crack.
  - Tara Strong was the voice-over actress for Dorothy.
- Dee Bradley Baker as the voice of Chistery, the leader of the winged monkeys.
  - Robin Guiver was the movement artist for Chistery
- Samuel Wright as the Yellow Brick Road guard in the beginning of the movie.

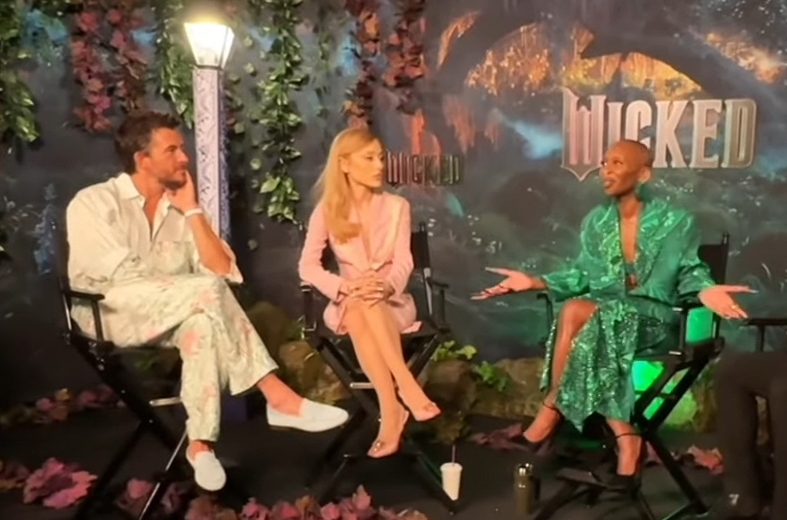
Jonathan Bailey, Ariana Grande, and Cynthia Erivo (L–R) reprise their roles as Fiyero, Glinda, and Elphaba respectively

Additionally, Keala Settle, Luisa Guerreiro, Adam James and Alice Fearn reprise their roles from Wicked as Miss Coddle, Dr. Dillamond's movement artist, and Glinda's parents, respectively. Courtney-Mae Briggs appears in archival footage as Mrs. Thropp, Elphaba and Nessarose's deceased mother.

== Production ==
=== Pre-production ===
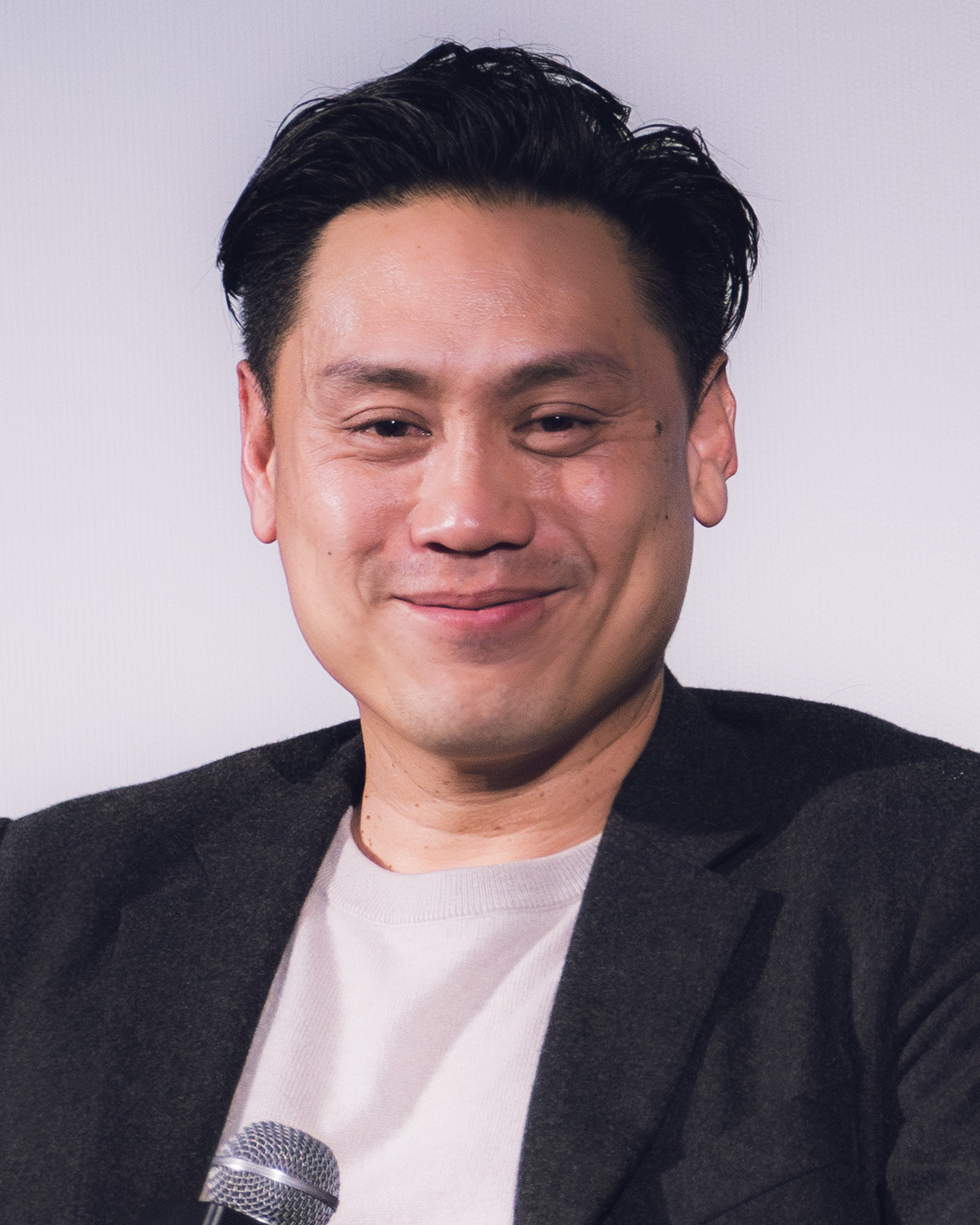
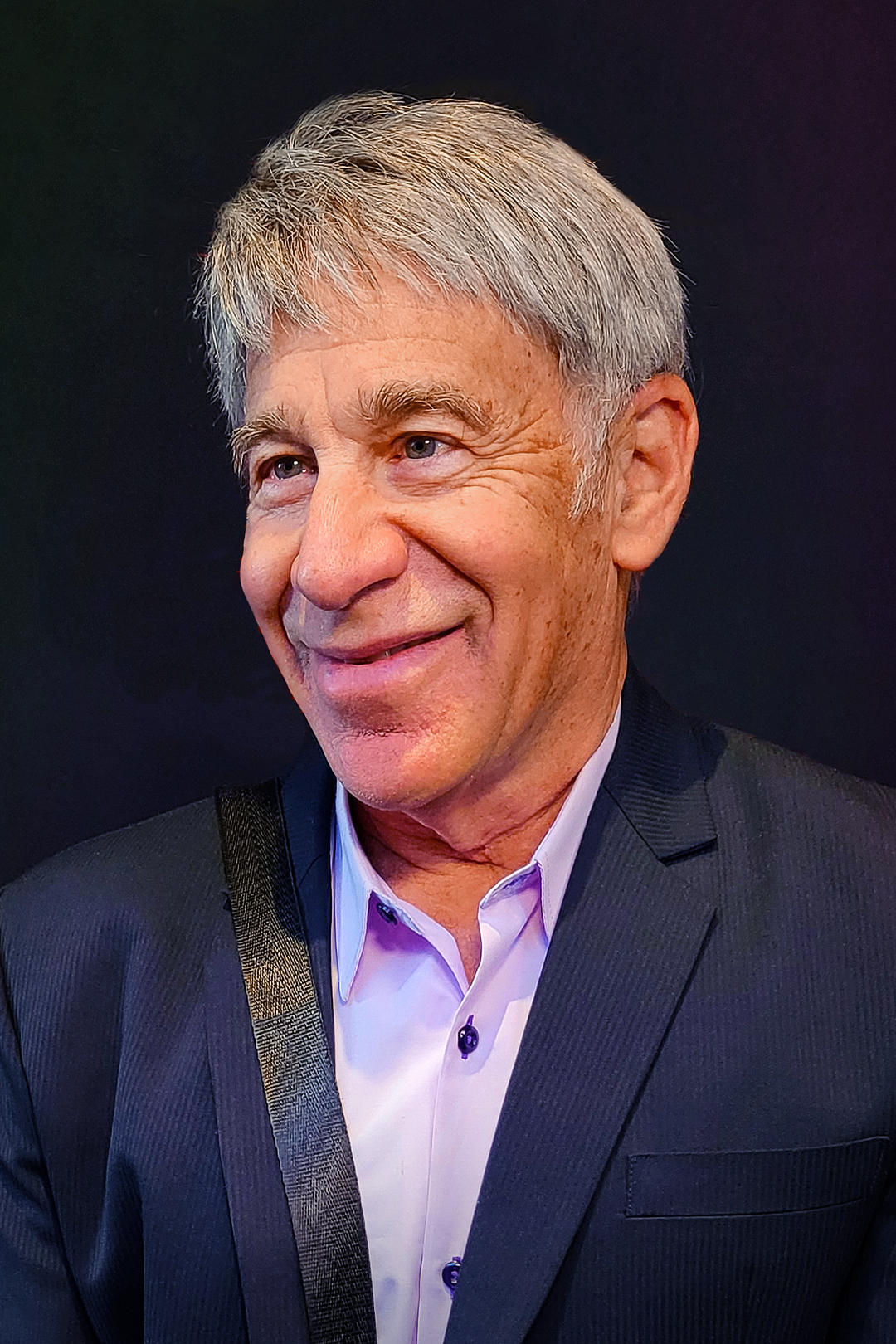
Director Jon M. Chu (left) and composer Stephen Schwartz

A film adaptation of the Broadway musical Wicked was announced in 2012, with scheduled release dates of December 20, 2019, December 22, 2021, December 25, 2024, and November 27, 2024. After numerous delays, the first film was released on November 22, 2024. In April 2022, director Jon M. Chu announced that the adaptation would be split in two parts, saying:

As we prepared the production over the last year, it became impossible to wrestle the story of 'Wicked' into a single film without doing some real damage to it... As we tried to cut songs or trim characters, those decisions began to feel like fatal compromises to the source material that has entertained us all for so many years. We decided to give ourselves a bigger canvas and make not just one 'Wicked' movie but two! With more space, we can tell the story of 'Wicked' as it was meant to be told while bringing even more depth and surprise to the journeys for these beloved characters.

Stephen Schwartz echoed Chu's sentiment in June, while also confirming that a new song was in the works for one of the two films:

We found it very difficult to get past 'Defying Gravity' without a break... That song is written specifically to bring a curtain down, and whatever scene to follow it without a break just seemed hugely anti-climactic... Even as a very long single movie, it required us cutting or omitting things that we wanted to include and that we think fans of the show and the story will appreciate. What we have discussed is that changes need to be 'additive,' to use (producer) Marc Platt's term. They need to add something to the story or the characters. They can't just be changes to do something different. I feel confident that by the time the movie is made, if we all continue to have the same degree of input, I could have a conversation with anyone who has a question about any of the changes made from the stage show and justify why I think it's better for the movie.

In November 2022, Schwartz said the film would include two new songs "to meet the demands of the storytelling". In December 2024, Chu said the film would have a darker tone and that the character of Dorothy Gale would have a more prominent role compared to the musical.

=== Filming ===
Principal photography began alongside Wicked on December 9, 2022, and had nearly finished by July 2023 before production was suspended due to the 2023 SAG-AFTRA strike. Filming resumed and concluded in January 2024. The song vocals were recorded live on set at the insistence of Erivo and Grande, with production sound mixer Simon Hayes using a variation of the same recording techniques he implemented on Les Misérables. Christopher Scott choreographed the musical numbers.

Chu cited Steven Spielberg's 1991 film Hook as inspiration for the large-scale sets and practical effects, including nine million colorful tulips planted on location to surround the Munchkinland set and a yellow brick road paved with real mud. Many sets from Wicked were repurposed in Wicked: For Good, such as the life-sized train to Emerald City doubling as Glinda's personal locomotive, and the Governor's Mansion in Munchkinland using elements of Shiz University's library and Madame Morrible's office. Chu also cited the 1998 films Pleasantville and The Truman Show as influences on how Wicked and Wicked: For Good thematically portray the Land of Oz, saying, "It helps create this idea of the rebelliousness that this new younger generation are discovering... How far will that take everybody in Oz throughout the course of the whole story of both movies? It's an awakening of a generation. You start to see the truth about things that maybe you were taught differently."

Boq's transformation into the Tin Man was a collaboration between production designer Nathan Crowley, costume designer Paul Tazewell, and prosthetic makeup designer Mark Coulier. The eleven-piece prosthetic set took four hours to apply to Ethan Slater's face and was designed in homage to Jack Haley's portrayal of the Tin Man in The Wizard of Oz (1939), with minimal VFX work used to simulate the Tin Man's joints. The design of the Scarecrow, in contrast, deviates from Ray Bolger's portrayal in The Wizard of Oz by retaining much of Jonathan Bailey's likeness, including the removal of his blue eye contacts as Fiyero in favor of his natural brown eye color.

=== Post-production and visual effects ===
Industrial Light & Magic (ILM) and Framestore provided the visual effects for Wicked: For Good, with Pablo Helman serving as the production visual effects supervisor. On February 6, 2024, it was confirmed that post-production work was in progress, with Chu working remotely with editor Myron Kerstein via the newly released Apple Vision Pro. Editing was paused during most of 2024, so that Chu could finish post-production on Wicked and figure out how Wicked: For Good would continue the story. Post-production resumed in November 2024, following the press tour and release of Wicked, with editing done through Avid Media Composer.

On December 16, 2024, the title was revealed as Wicked: For Good, sharing its subtitle with the name of the musical's penultimate song. Chu defended the title as always having been the right choice over the working title, Wicked: Part Two, though the latter was retained on certain international releases.

=== Music ===
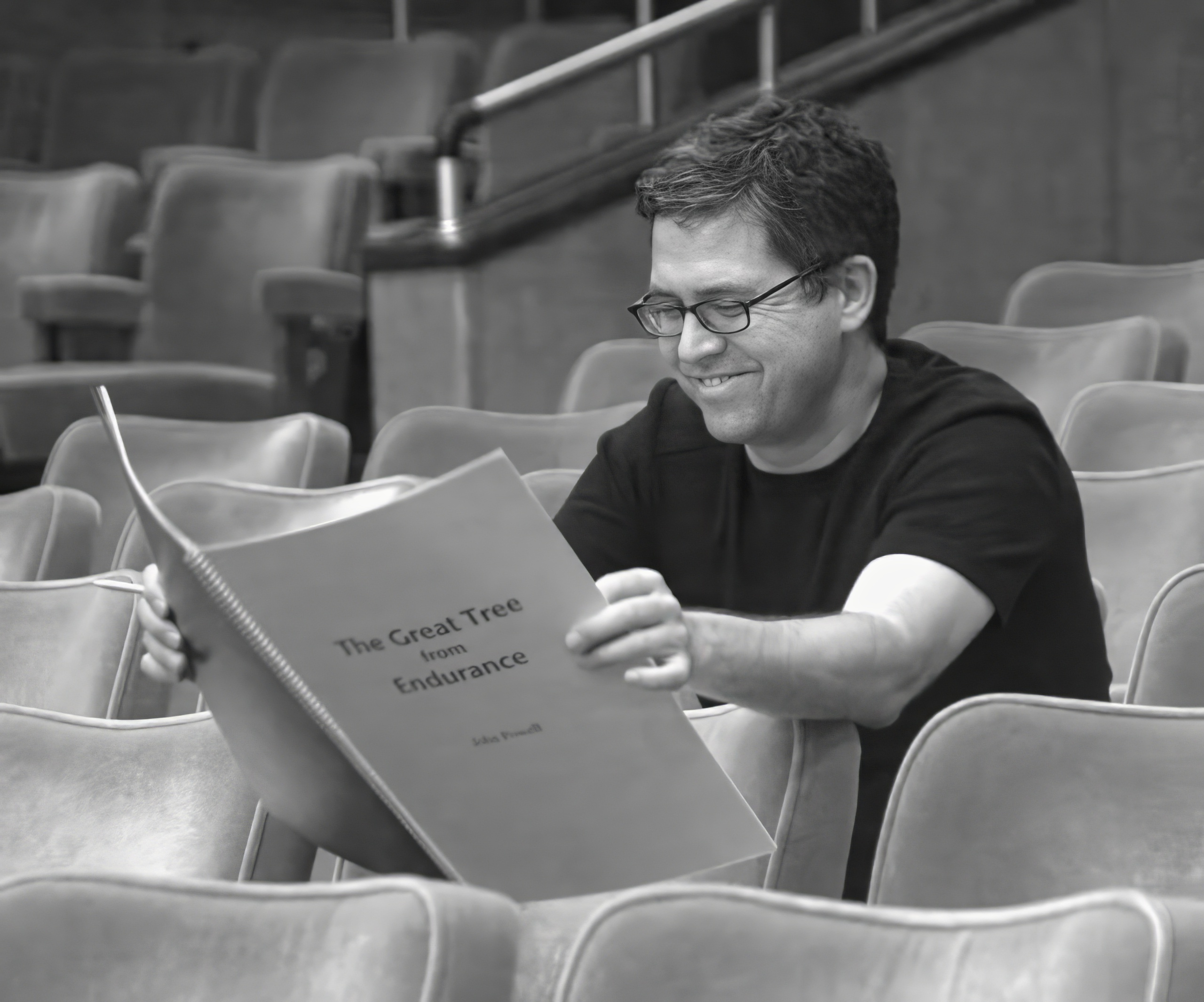
John Powell (pictured in 2008) co-composed the incidental underscore with Stephen Schwartz.

The soundtrack album for Wicked: For Good was released on November 21, 2025, through Republic and Verve Records. The score album was released on December 5, 2025. As with Wicked, Schwartz composed the score alongside John Powell, who conducted the score cues with Gavin Greenaway. Jeff Atmajian updated William David Brohn's original orchestrations for the songs and enlarged the orchestra from the stage version's original 23 musicians to 125. The song cues were conducted by original music director Stephen Oremus. Schwartz, Oremus, and Greg Wells served as the soundtrack's producers.

In January 2025, Wells revealed that he and Atmajian were in the process of recording live instrumentals, with recording scheduled to happen in May or June 2025 with the orchestra at AIR Studios, followed by mixing over the subsequent months. Later that month, a home studio belonging to Wells was destroyed in the 2025 Palisades Fire, halting production.

==== Main musical numbers ====
- "Every Day More Wicked" – Ozians, Madame Morrible, Elphaba and Glinda
- "Thank Goodness/I Couldn't Be Happier" – Glinda, Morrible, Fiyero and Ozians
- "No Place Like Home" – Elphaba
- "The Wicked Witch of the East" – Nessarose, Elphaba and Boq
- "Wonderful" – The Wizard, Glinda and Elphaba
- "I'm Not That Girl" (Reprise) – Glinda
- "As Long as You're Mine" – Elphaba and Fiyero
- "No Good Deed" – Elphaba
- "March of the Witch Hunters" – Boq and Ozians
- "The Girl in the Bubble" – Glinda
- "For Good" – Elphaba and Glinda
- "A Wicked Good Finale" – Glinda, Elphaba and Ozians

"Every Day More Wicked" is a reprise of "No One Mourns the Wicked" that also interpolates several songs from the first act and film, such as "The Wizard and I", "What Is This Feeling?", and "Popular". "No Place Like Home" and "The Girl in the Bubble" were written for the film, with the former written in collaboration with Erivo. "A Wicked Good Finale", adapted from the original "Finale" track from the stage musical, appears on the score album as opposed to the soundtrack album.

== Differences from the musical ==
New scenes depict Elphaba's efforts to liberate the Animals, some of whom are constructing the Yellow Brick Road under forced labor or are escaping Oz to regions unknown. She sings "No Place Like Home" to convince them to stay, only for the Cowardly Lion to appear and reveal that Elphaba gave the flying monkeys their wings. Before "The Wicked Witch of the East", Boq attempts to leave Munchkinland but is prevented by a decree from Nessarose that prohibits Animals and Munchkins from leaving the region, whereas this is only mentioned in the musical. “The Wicked Witch of the East" is also revised to remove its ableist implications, with Nessarose's resentment over her disability changed to her remorse over her relationship with Boq. Instead of being able to walk upright, Nessarose now flies in the air after Elphaba enchants her shoes.

Before confronting the Wizard in the Emerald City, Elphaba reunites with Glinda. The latter accompanies the Wizard during "Wonderful", which features revised lyrics and a reprise of "Defying Gravity". Afterward, Elphaba discovers an entire room filled with captive Animals, which plays against Glinda and Fiyero's wedding procession. As she descends further down, she finds Dr. Dillamond caged and unable to speak. Her outrage breaks the Animals out of their cages, who stampede through the ceremony as they flee.

The tornado created by Madame Morrible is depicted on-screen, with Nessarose searching for Boq in the storm before Dorothy's house crushes her. Dorothy and Toto also appear on-screen, including their departure from Munchkinland, initial meeting with the Wizard, confrontation with Elphaba, and the launching of the hot air balloon. Dorothy's face is never clearly shown, and she doesn't encounter Elphaba in Munchkinland or on the Yellow Brick Road. While Elphaba follows the tornado back to Munchkinland, Fiyero comes across the flying monkeys and allies with them. The monkeys join him in freeing Elphaba from the Gale Force, then accompany her to Kiamo Ko.

"March of the Witch Hunters" is split into two sections, with Glinda singing "The Girl in the Bubble" in between before she confronts Morrible. After "For Good", Glinda readmits the Animals into Ozian society in a continuation of her speech from the start of Wicked. She does not remain in Munchkinland for "A Wicked Good Finale", instead visiting the tower where Elphaba first flew west. At the end of the song, the Grimmerie activates for Glinda, and the final shot of the film features her whispering in Elphaba's ear, recreating the Broadway poster.

== Release ==
=== Marketing ===
Work-in-process footage from both films in the adaptation was presented at CinemaCon on April 26, 2023. The 60-second teaser trailer for Wicked, which premiered during Super Bowl LVIII on February 11, 2024, featured brief scenes from Wicked: For Good that expand the plot of the musical's second act, including clips of Glinda's wedding and the Wizard sending Dorothy and her traveling party to hunt Elphaba down. In February 2025, Chu revealed that the Wicked: For Good theatrical trailer would premiere sometime in the spring or early summer, after technical difficulties with the visual effects prevented it from airing during Super Bowl LIX.

The two-minute trailer premiered at CinemaCon on April 2, introduced on stage by Erivo, Grande, Chu and Platt. It was publicly released on June 4, 2025, attached to a one-night theatrical re-release of Wicked, before premiering online afterwards. Simultaneously, the Shiz University website introduced in the first film's promotional campaign was updated, replacing links to the college's locations with an audio recording of Madame Morrible's propaganda speech against Elphaba, and a ticker tape urging visitors to report any "suspicious witch activity" to Morrible and the Wizard. Dr. Dillamond's classroom page was also updated to replace the lecture of Oz's history on the chalkboard with the phrase "Animals should be seen and not heard", a reference to the character's fate in the first film.

On June 9, Universal reported that the Wicked: For Good trailer received 113 million views in its first 24 hours, surpassing the 75 million views made in the same time-frame by its predecessor. That same day, an episode of Lego Masters with challenges themed to Wicked aired on Fox in the United States as part of the series' fifth season. On August 6, a "First Look" featurette was released, containing behind-the-scenes footage and interviews with Chu, Erivo, and Grande on the evolution between the two Wicked films. A final theatrical trailer was released on September 24, 2025.

On television, the tenth season of RuPaul's Drag Race All Stars featured a Wicked challenge in its seventh episode, where contestants worked in pairs to design outfits with a relevant backstory. Erivo and Grande sat on the panel as guest judges. For the sixth week of its thirty-fourth season, Dancing with the Stars held a "Wicked Night" where couples danced to songs from Wicked and Wicked: For Good. Chu appeared as a guest judge, while Erivo, Grande, Jonathan Bailey, and Michelle Yeoh appeared in pre-recorded greetings. The episode included a new clip from the "Wonderful" performance. A musical television special, Wicked: One Wonderful Night, aired on NBC on November 6, featuring the cast and special guests performing songs from Wicked and Wicked: For Good live from the Dolby Theatre in Los Angeles. An encore presentation of the special aired on December 31. Wicked was shown on NBC on November 19, 2025.

Universal's direct global promotional efforts for Wicked: For Good were scaled back from the first film, with a $90 million budget, compared to the $150 million budget for Wicked. However, the second film had over 400 brand partners for international marketing, with $330 million in media value, the second largest spend ever, just shy of the record-breaking $350 million from marketing partners for the first film.

=== Theatrical ===
Wicked: For Good was screened privately at the DGA Theater in Manhattan, New York on October 27, 2025, with Grande, Chu, Platt, Schwartz, and members of the Broadway cast in attendance. Two private screenings were held in London on November 9; one for members of the musical's West End production, and another for BAFTA voters that was followed by a discussion with members of the film crew, including cinematographer Alice Brooks and production designer Nathan Crowley.

Wicked: For Good premiered in São Paulo at the Suhai Music Hall on November 4, 2025, with subsequent premieres in Paris at Le Grand Rex on November 7, London at Cineworld Leicester Square on November 10, Singapore at Universal Studios Singapore on November 13, and Manhattan, New York at the Metropolitan Opera House on November 17. It was theatrically released by Universal Pictures in the United States on November 21, 2025, with engagements in RealD 3D, IMAX, Dolby Cinema, 4DX, ScreenX and D-Box. It was previously scheduled for release on November 26, 2025, and December 25, 2025, before being moved up to avoid competition with Zootopia 2 and Avatar: Fire and Ash, respectively. Advanced screenings took place on November 17, 2025, for Amazon Prime subscribers, and on November 20 for the general public. A one-time double feature of Wicked and Wicked: For Good was also released in select theaters on the latter date.

=== Home media ===
Wicked: For Good was released on video on demand on December 30, 2025, in the United States. It was released on 4K Blu-ray, Blu-ray, and DVD on January 20, 2026, by Universal Pictures Home Entertainment. On January 1, 2026, Wicked: For Good became available to purchase or rent through Roku devices, with bonus features such as a dance performance of "Wonderful" and a choir rendition of "For Good" by the MUSYCA Children's Choir. On February 9, 2026, it was announced that Wicked: For Good would stream on Peacock beginning March 20, 2026, followed by Netflix on July 20.

== Reception ==
=== Box office ===
==== Advanced sales and marketing projections ====
Tickets for Wicked: For Good went on sale on October 8, 2025. The following day, Fandango announced that it was the site's best first-day ticket pre-seller of 2025, surpassing Demon Slayer: Kimetsu no Yaiba – The Movie: Infinity Castle, Taylor Swift: The Official Release Party of a Showgirl, and Superman. It additionally became the biggest PG-rated first-day ticket pre-seller of all time, ahead of Frozen 2, the 2019 remake of The Lion King, and the sing-along version of KPop Demon Hunters, and entered the top 10 best first-day ticket pre-sellers of all time on Fandango. Jerramy Hainline, EVP of Fandango Ticketing, said: "With last year's Wicked breaking records and captivating audiences around the world, it is no surprise that fans are racing to get their tickets to Wicked: For Good ... The first film became a true cultural phenomenon bringing new generations into the world of Wicked, and it's clear that fans can't wait to see how the story continues on the big screen." Deadline Hollywood projected the film to gross $112–115 million in its domestic opening weekend, on par with the $112.5 million opening gross of the first film, while Variety projected an opening weekend as high as $150–180 million.

==== Performance ====
Wicked: For Good has grossed $342.9 million in the United States and Canada, and $197.4 million in other territories, for a worldwide total of $540.3 million. In the United States and Canada, it made $69.1 million on its opening day, which included $30.8 million from preview showings in the week leading up to its release: $6.1 million on Monday, $6.5 million on Wednesday, and $18.2 million on Thursday. Its box office previews were the biggest of the year, surpassing The Fantastic Four: First Steps ($24.4 million). The film topped the domestic and international box offices with grosses of $147 million and $223 million, respectively, surpassing its predecessor to earn the highest opening weekend for a Broadway adaptation. It also ranked as the second-biggest opening of 2025 behind A Minecraft Movie ($162.8 million), the third-biggest opening for a Universal film behind Jurassic World ($208.8 million) and Jurassic World: Fallen Kingdom ($148 million), the second-biggest pre-Thanksgiving debut behind The Hunger Games: Catching Fire ($158 million), and the third-biggest opening for a musical film behind the remakes of The Lion King ($191.8 million) and Beauty and the Beast ($174.8 million). In its second weekend, Wicked: For Good grossed $62.8 million (and a total of $93 million over the five-day Thanksgiving frame), dropping 57% and finishing second behind newcomer Zootopia 2. During its third weekend, the film fell to third place, grossing $17.3 million behind Five Nights at Freddy's 2 and Zootopia 2.

=== Critical response ===
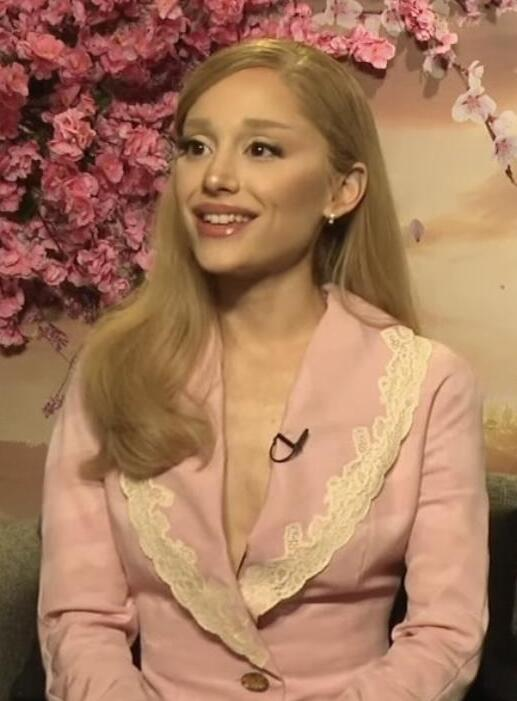
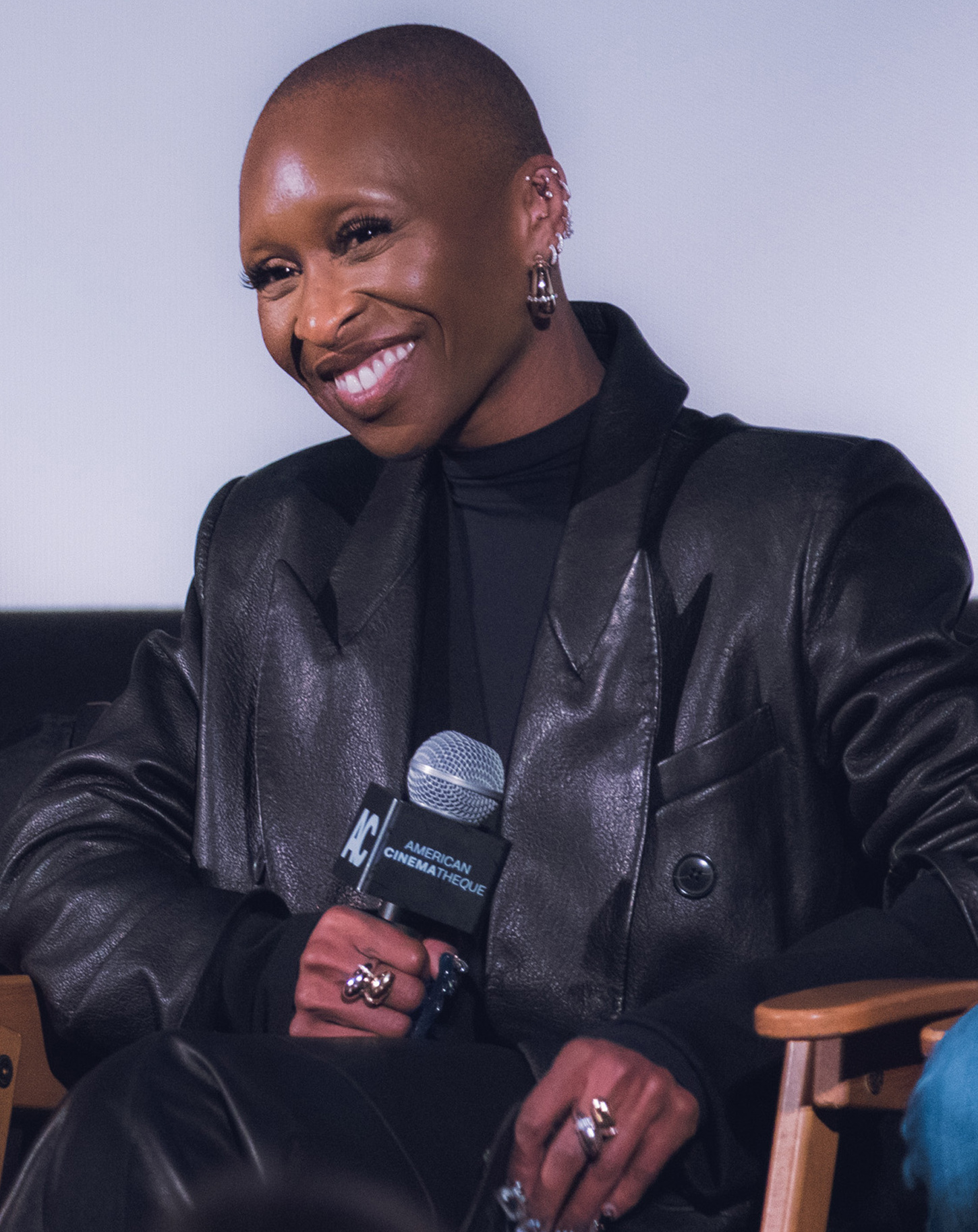
Ariana Grande and Cynthia Erivo continued to garner praise for their performances despite the film's mixed reception.

Metacritic review
breakdown (unweighted)

Positive
32 (53%)
Mixed
23 (38%)
Negative
5 (8%)

Wicked: For Good divided critics upon release; while initial reviews were mostly positive, (Note: Attributed to multiple references:) its reception became more mixed over time and was characterized as less enthusiastic than that of the first film. (Note: Attributed to multiple references:) (Note: Attributed to multiple references:) Critics generally praised the performances of the cast (particularly Grande and Erivo), the production design, and costuming, but took issue with the direction, pacing, and connections back to The Wonderful Wizard of Oz. On the review aggregator website Rotten Tomatoes, 66% of 357 critics' reviews are positive, with an average rating of 6.5/10. The website's consensus reads: "Taking one last lap down the yellow brick road, Wicked: For Good's darker tone and unhurried pacing sometimes get in the way, but this epic conclusion ultimately brings Elphaba and Glinda's story home in rousing fashion." Metacritic, which uses a weighted average, assigned the film a score of 58 out of 100, based on 60 critics, indicating "mixed or average" reviews. Audiences polled by CinemaScore gave the film an average grade of "A" on an A+ to F scale, same score as the first film, while those surveyed by PostTrak gave it a 92% overall positive score, with 82% saying they would "definitely recommend" it.

Early reactions deemed Wicked: For Good superior to the first film and the second act of the stage musical, with Chu's direction and the performances of Erivo and Grande lauded. Kevin Maher, in a four star out of five review for The Times, felt the movie "surpasses last year's box-office smash in verve, ambition and emotional ache", but highlighted several sluggish moments and less impactful musical numbers, such as "The Girl in the Bubble" and "For Good". Johnny Oleksinski of the New York Post lamented the tonal imbalance caused by splitting the musical into two films, but found the "darker and grimmer Act 2" to offer a far more compelling narrative, with improved character arcs for Elphaba and Glinda compared to the "bright and poppy YA boarding-school story" from the first film.

In a negative review, Justin Chang of The New Yorker stated that the film is "so cowed by its iconic predecessor" (the 1939 Wizard of Oz and the stage musical) that instead of building authentically, it reacts with destructiveness – almost a petulant attempt to outdo what came before. Donald Clarke of The Irish Times gave the film a rating of two out of five, stating that "if you bought the first film's brash visual aesthetic – the result of a giant toddler vomiting candyfloss all over Walt Disney World – then you will be relieved to discover it has got no less stomach-unsettling."

=== Accolades ===
In contrast to the ten Academy Award nominations and two wins earned by Wicked at the 97th ceremony, Wicked: For Good failed to receive any nominations at the 98th ceremony, despite previously being shortlisted in eight categories. As a result, Wicked: For Good set a record for the largest drop in Oscar nominations compared to its predecessor.

Award	Date of ceremony	Category	Recipient(s)	Result	Ref.
Actor Awards	March 1, 2026	Outstanding Performance by a Female Actor in a Supporting Role	Ariana Grande	Nominated	
ADG Excellence in Production Design Awards	February 28, 2026	Excellence in Production Design for a Fantasy Film	Nathan Crowley	Nominated	
African-American Film Critics Association	December 9, 2025	Top Ten Films of the Year	Wicked: For Good	6th place	
American Cinematheque Tribute to the Crafts Awards	January 16, 2026	Choreography	Christopher Scott	Honored	
American Film Institute Awards	December 4, 2025	Top 10 Films	Wicked: For Good	Won (Note: This award does not have a single winner, but recognizes multiple films.)	
Artios Awards	February 26, 2026	Feature Big Budget – Comedy	Bernard Telsey, Tiffany Little Canfield; Ryan Bernard Tymensky (Associate Casting Director); Tamsyn Manson (Location Casting Director)	Nominated	
Astra Film Awards	January 9, 2026	Best Picture – Comedy or Musical	Wicked: For Good	Nominated	
Astra Film Awards	January 9, 2026	Best Actress – Comedy or Musical	Cynthia Erivo	Nominated	
Astra Film Awards	January 9, 2026	Best Supporting Actor – Comedy or Musical	Jonathan Bailey	Nominated	
Astra Film Awards	January 9, 2026	Best Supporting Actress – Comedy or Musical	Ariana Grande	Won	
Astra Film Awards	January 9, 2026	Best Cast Ensemble	Wicked: For Good	Nominated	
Astra Film Awards	January 9, 2026	Best Young Performer	Marissa Bode	Nominated	
Astra Film Awards	January 9, 2026	Best Original Song	"No Place Like Home" – Stephen Schwartz	Nominated	
Astra Film Awards	January 9, 2026	Best Original Song	"The Girl in the Bubble" – Stephen Schwartz	Nominated	
Astra Film Awards	December 11, 2025	Best Costume Design	Paul Tazewell	Nominated	
Astra Film Awards	December 11, 2025	Best Film Editing	Myron Kerstein	Nominated	
Astra Film Awards	December 11, 2025	Best Makeup and Hairstyling	Frances Hannon, Mark Coulier, and Laura Blount	Nominated	
Astra Film Awards	December 11, 2025	Best Marketing Campaign	Wicked: For Good	Nominated	
Astra Film Awards	December 11, 2025	Best Production Design	Nathan Crowley and Lee Sandales	Nominated	
Astra Film Awards	December 11, 2025	Best Sound	Nancy Nugent Title, John Marquis, Andy Nelson, Simon Hayes, and Jack Dolman	Nominated	
Astra Film Awards	December 11, 2025	Best Stunt Coordinator	Andrei Nazarenko	Nominated	
Astra Film Awards	December 11, 2025	Best Visual Effects	Pablo Helman, Jonathan Fawkner, Anthony Smith, Dale Newton, and Paul Corbould	Won	
Astra Midseason Movie Awards	July 3, 2025	Most Anticipated Film	Wicked: For Good	Won	
Black Reel Awards	February 16, 2026	Outstanding Film	Wicked: For Good	Nominated	
Black Reel Awards	February 16, 2026	Outstanding Lead Performance	Cynthia Erivo	Nominated	
Black Reel Awards	February 16, 2026	Outstanding Soundtrack	Wicked: For Good – The Soundtrack	Nominated	
Black Reel Awards	February 16, 2026	Outstanding Costume Design	Paul Tazewell	Won	
Black Reel Awards	February 16, 2026	Outstanding Production Design	Nathan Crowley and Lee Sandales	Nominated	
British Academy Film Awards	February 22, 2026	Best Costume Design	Paul Tazewell	Nominated	
British Academy Film Awards	February 22, 2026	Best Make Up & Hair	Frances Hannon, Laura Blount, Mark Coulier, and Sarah Nuth	Nominated	
Chicago Film Critics Association	December 11, 2025	Best Costume Design	Paul Tazewell	Nominated	
Costume Designers Guild Awards	February 12, 2026	Excellence in Sci-Fi/Fantasy Film	Paul Tazewell	Won	
Critics' Choice Movie Awards	January 4, 2026	Best Picture	Wicked: For Good	Nominated	
Critics' Choice Movie Awards	January 4, 2026	Best Supporting Actress	Ariana Grande	Nominated	
Critics' Choice Movie Awards	January 4, 2026	Best Casting and Ensemble	Tiffany Little Canfield and Bernard Telsey	Nominated	
Critics' Choice Movie Awards	January 4, 2026	Best Costume Design	Paul Tazewell	Nominated	
Critics' Choice Movie Awards	January 4, 2026	Best Production Design	Nathan Crowley and Lee Sandales	Nominated	
Critics' Choice Movie Awards	January 4, 2026	Best Song	"The Girl in the Bubble" – Stephen Schwartz	Nominated	
Critics' Choice Movie Awards	January 4, 2026	Best Hair and Make-Up	Frances Hannon, Mark Coulier, and Laura Blount	Nominated	
Digital Spy Reader Awards	December 28, 2024	Most Anticipated Movie of 2025	Wicked: For Good	Won	
Dorian Awards	March 3, 2026	Supporting Film Performance of the Year	Ariana Grande	Nominated	
Dorian Awards	March 3, 2026	Campiest Flick	Wicked: For Good	Nominated	
Dorian Awards	March 3, 2026	Wilde Artist Award	Cynthia Erivo	Nominated	
Dorian Awards	March 3, 2026	Galeca LGBTQIA+ Film Trailblazer	Jonathan Bailey	Nominated	
Georgia Film Critics Association	December 27, 2025	Best Supporting Actress	Ariana Grande	Nominated	
Golden Globe Awards	January 11, 2026	Best Actress in a Motion Picture – Musical or Comedy	Cynthia Erivo	Nominated	
Golden Globe Awards	January 11, 2026	Best Supporting Actress – Motion Picture	Ariana Grande	Nominated	
Golden Globe Awards	January 11, 2026	Cinematic and Box Office Achievement	Wicked: For Good	Nominated	
Golden Globe Awards	January 11, 2026	Best Original Song	Stephen Schwartz (for "No Place Like Home")	Nominated	
Golden Globe Awards	January 11, 2026	Best Original Song	Stephen Schwartz (for "The Girl in the Bubble")	Nominated	
Grammy Awards	February 7, 2027	Best Compilation Soundtrack for Visual Media	Cynthia Erivo, Ariana Grande and Wicked Movie Cast, artists; Stephen Oremus, Stephen Schwartz, and Greg Wells, compilation producers; Maggie Rodford, music supervisor	Pending	
Grammy Awards	February 7, 2027	Best Traditional Pop Vocal Performance	Cynthia Erivo and Ariana Grande (for "For Good")	Pending	
Grammy Awards	February 7, 2027	Best Song Written for Visual Media	Stephen Schwartz (for "No Place Like Home")	Pending	
Greater Western New York Film Critics Association	January 10, 2026	Best Supporting Actress	Ariana Grande	Nominated	
Guild of Music Supervisors Awards	February 28, 2026	Best Music Supervision in Major Budget Films	Maggie Rodford	Nominated	
Hawaii Film Critics Society	January 12, 2026	Best Costume Design	Paul Tazewell	Nominated	
Hawaii Film Critics Society	January 12, 2026	Best Make-Up	Frances Hannon, Mark Coulier, and Laura Blount	Nominated	
Hollywood Music in Media Awards	November 19, 2025	Score – Feature Film	John Powell and Stephen Schwartz	Nominated	
Hollywood Music in Media Awards	November 19, 2025	Song – Feature Film	"No Place Like Home" – Written by Stephen Schwartz; Performed by Cynthia Erivo	Nominated	
Hollywood Music in Media Awards	November 19, 2025	Song – Feature Film	"The Girl in the Bubble" – Written by Stephen Schwartz; Performed by Ariana Grande	Nominated	
Hollywood Music in Media Awards	November 19, 2025	Music Supervision – Film	Maggie Rodford	Nominated	
Hollywood Music in Media Awards	November 19, 2025	Music Themed Film, Biopic or Musical	Jon M. Chu	Won	
Hollywood Music in Media Awards	November 19, 2025	Soundtrack Album	Republic Records	Nominated	
iHeartRadio Music Awards	March 26, 2026	Favorite Soundtrack	Wicked: For Good – The Soundtrack	Nominated	
iHeartRadio Music Awards	March 26, 2026	Favorite On Screen	Ariana Grande and Cynthia Erivo	Nominated	
Iowa Film Critics Association	December 28, 2025	Best Supporting Actress	Ariana Grande	Won	
Iowa Film Critics Association	December 28, 2025	Best Original Song	"The Girl in the Bubble"	Won	
International Cinematographers Guild	March 13, 2026	Maxwell Weinberg Award for Motion Picture Publicity Campaign	Wicked: For Good	Nominated	
Las Vegas Film Critics Society	December 19, 2025	Best Supporting Actress	Ariana Grande	Nominated	
Las Vegas Film Critics Society	December 19, 2025	Best Costume Design	Paul Tazewell	Nominated	
Las Vegas Film Critics Society	December 19, 2025	Best Art Direction	Nathan Crowley and Lee Sandales	Nominated	
Las Vegas Film Critics Society	December 19, 2025	Top 10 Films of 2025	Wicked: For Good	9th place	
Latino Entertainment Journalists Association	February 9, 2026	Best Production Design	Nathan Crowley and Lee Sandales	Nominated	
Latino Entertainment Journalists Association	February 9, 2026	Best Costume Design	Paul Tazewell	Nominated	
Latino Entertainment Journalists Association	February 9, 2026	Best Hair & Makeup	Frances Hannon, Mark Coulier, and Laura Blount	Nominated	
Latino Entertainment Journalists Association	February 9, 2026	Best Song	"The Girl in the Bubble"	Nominated	
Latino Entertainment Journalists Association	February 9, 2026	Best Visual Effects	Pablo Helman, Jonathan Fawkner, Anthony Smith, Dale Newton, and Paul Corbould	Nominated	
London Film Critics' Circle	February 1, 2026	Cynthia Erivo	Derek Malcolm Award for Innovation	Honored	
Lumière Awards	February 9, 2026	Jon M. Chu	Judy Garland Award	Honored	
Make-Up Artists & Hair Stylists Guild	February 14, 2026	Best Period and/or Character Make-Up	Frances Hannon, Alice Jones, Nuria Mbomio, and Sarah Nuth	Nominated	
Make-Up Artists & Hair Stylists Guild	February 14, 2026	Best Period Hair Styling and/or Character Hair Styling	Frances Hannon, Sim Camps, Gabor Kerekes, and Laura Blount	Nominated	
Make-Up Artists & Hair Stylists Guild	February 14, 2026	Best Special Make-Up Effects	Frances Hannon, Mark Coulier, Stephen Murphy, and Susie Redfern	Nominated	
Michigan Movie Critics Guild	December 8, 2025	Best Actress	Cynthia Erivo	Nominated	
Michigan Movie Critics Guild	December 8, 2025	Best Supporting Actress	Ariana Grande	Nominated	
Michigan Movie Critics Guild	December 8, 2025	Best Ensemble	Wicked: For Good	Nominated	
Middleburg Film Festival	October 19, 2025	Creative Collaborators Award	Alice Brooks and Myron Kerstein	Won	
Minnesota Film Critics Association	January 2, 2026	Best Costume Design	Paul Tazewell	Nominated	
Minnesota Film Critics Association	January 2, 2026	Best Makeup and Hairstyling	Frances Hannon, Mark Coulier, and Laura Blount	Nominated	
Minnesota Film Critics Association	January 2, 2026	Best Production Design	Nathan Crowley and Lee Sandales	Nominated	
Music City Film Critics Association	January 12, 2026	Best Music Film	Wicked: For Good	Nominated	
Music City Film Critics Association	January 12, 2026	Best Production Design	Nathan Crowley and Lee Sandales	Nominated	
Music City Film Critics Association	January 12, 2026	Best Original Song	"The Girl in the Bubble" – Ariana Grande	Nominated	
Music City Film Critics Association	January 12, 2026	Best Sound	Nancy Nugent Title, John Marquis, Andy Nelson, Simon Hayes, and Jack Dolman	Nominated	
NAACP Image Awards	February 28, 2026	Outstanding Motion Picture	Wicked: For Good	Nominated	
NAACP Image Awards	February 28, 2026	Outstanding Actress in a Motion Picture	Cynthia Erivo	Won	
NAACP Image Awards	February 28, 2026	Outstanding Ensemble Cast in a Motion Picture	Jonathan Bailey, Marissa Bode, Colman Domingo, Cynthia Erivo, Jeff Goldblum, Ariana Grande, Ethan Slater, Bowen Yang, Michelle Yeoh	Nominated	
NAACP Image Awards	February 28, 2026	Outstanding Costume Design (Television or Motion Picture)	Paul Tazewell	Nominated	
NAACP Image Awards	February 28, 2026	Outstanding Soundtrack/Compilation Album	Wicked: For Good – The Soundtrack	Nominated	
National Board of Review	December 3, 2025	Top 10 Films	Wicked: For Good	Won	
New Jersey Film Critics Circle	December 31, 2025	Best Supporting Actress	Ariana Grande	Nominated	
New Jersey Film Critics Circle	December 31, 2025	Best Production Design	Nathan Crowley and Lee Sandales	Nominated	
New Jersey Film Critics Circle	December 31, 2025	Best Costume Design	Paul Tazewell	Runner-up	
New Jersey Film Critics Circle	December 31, 2025	Best Hair and Makeup	Frances Hannon, Mark Coulier, and Laura Blount	Nominated	
New York Film Critics Online	December 15, 2025	Best Supporting Actress	Ariana Grande	Nominated	
New York Film Critics Online	December 15, 2025	Best Cinematography	Alice Brooks	Nominated	
New York Film Critics Online	December 15, 2025	Best Use of Music	John Powell and Stephen Schwartz	Nominated	
Nickelodeon Kids' Choice Awards	November 14, 2026	Favorite Movie	Wicked: For Good	Nominated	
Nickelodeon Kids' Choice Awards	November 14, 2026	Favorite Movie Actress	Cynthia Erivo	Nominated	
Nickelodeon Kids' Choice Awards	November 14, 2026	Favorite Movie Actress	Ariana Grande	Nominated	
Nickelodeon Kids' Choice Awards	November 14, 2026	Favorite Villain	Jeff Goldblum	Nominated	
Nickelodeon Kids' Choice Awards	November 14, 2026	Favorite Song from a Movie	Cynthia Erivo and Ariana Grande for "For Good"	Nominated	
Nickelodeon Kids' Choice Awards	November 14, 2026	Favorite On-Screen Duo/Trio	Ariana Grande and Cynthia Erivo	Nominated	
North Dakota Film Society	January 12, 2026	Best Costume Design	Paul Tazewell	Nominated	
North Dakota Film Society	January 12, 2026	Best Makeup & Hairstyling	Frances Hannon, Mark Coulier, and Laura Blount	Nominated	
North Dakota Film Society	January 12, 2026	Best Production Design	Nathan Crowley and Lee Sandales	Nominated	
North Texas Film Critics Association	December 29, 2025	Best Actress	Cynthia Erivo	Nominated	
North Texas Film Critics Association	December 29, 2025	Best Supporting Actress	Ariana Grande	Nominated	
Online Film Critics Society	January 26, 2026	Best Production Design	Nathan Crowley and Lee Sandales	Nominated	
Online Film Critics Society	January 26, 2026	Best Costume Design	Paul Tazewell	Nominated	
Online Film Critics Society	January 26, 2026	Best Makeup & Hairstyling	Frances Hannon, Mark Coulier, and Laura Blount	Nominated	
Online Film Critics Society	January 26, 2026	Best Choreography (Dance & Stunt)	Christopher Scott	Nominated	
Online Film & Television Association	February 15, 2026	Best Supporting Actress	Ariana Grande	Nominated	
Online Film & Television Association	February 15, 2026	Best Original Song	"The Girl in the Bubble"	Nominated	
Online Film & Television Association	February 15, 2026	Best Original Song	"No Place Like Home"	Nominated	
Online Film & Television Association	February 15, 2026	Best Adapted Song	"As Long as You're Mine"	Nominated	
Online Film & Television Association	February 15, 2026	Best Adapted Song	"For Good"	Runner-up	
Online Film & Television Association	February 15, 2026	Best Adapted Song	"No Good Deed"	Nominated	
Online Film & Television Association	February 15, 2026	Best Production Design	Nathan Crowley and Lee Sandales	Nominated	
Online Film & Television Association	February 15, 2026	Best Costume Design	Paul Tazewell	Runner-up	
Online Film & Television Association	February 15, 2026	Best Makeup and Hair	Frances Hannon, Mark Coulier, and Laura Blount	Nominated	
Online Film & Television Association	February 15, 2026	Best Movie Trailer	Wicked: For Good	Nominated	
Puerto Rico Critics Association	January 2, 2026	Best Costume Design	Paul Tazewell	Runner-up	
Puerto Rico Critics Association	January 2, 2026	Best Hair & Makeup	Frances Hannon, Mark Coulier, and Laura Blount	Nominated	
Puerto Rico Critics Association	January 2, 2026	Best Production Design	Nathan Crowley and Lee Sandales	Runner-up	
The Queerties	March 11, 2025	Next Big Thing	Wicked: For Good	Won	
San Diego Film Critics Society	December 15, 2025	Best Costume Design	Paul Tazewell	Won	
Santa Barbara International Film Festival	February 8, 2026	Kirk Douglas Award	Cynthia Erivo	Honored	
Satellite Awards	March 28, 2026	Best Actress in a Motion Picture – Comedy or Musical	Cynthia Erivo	Nominated	
Satellite Awards	March 28, 2026	Best Actress in a Supporting Role	Ariana Grande	Nominated	
Satellite Awards	March 28, 2026	Best Original Song	"No Place Like Home" – Stephen Schwartz	Nominated	
Satellite Awards	March 28, 2026	Best Original Song	"The Girl in the Bubble" – Stephen Schwartz	Nominated	
Satellite Awards	March 28, 2026	Best Sound	Nancy Nugent Title, John Marquis, Andy Nelson, Simon Hayes, and Jack Dolman	Nominated	
Satellite Awards	March 28, 2026	Best Production Design	Nathan Crowley and Lee Sandales	Nominated	
Satellite Awards	March 28, 2026	Best Costume Design	Paul Tazewell	Nominated	
Satellite Awards	March 28, 2026	Best Makeup & Hair	Frances Hannon, Mark Coulier, and Laura Blount	Nominated	
Saturn Awards	March 8, 2026	Best Fantasy Film	Wicked: For Good	Won	
Saturn Awards	March 8, 2026	Best Actress in a Film	Cynthia Erivo	Nominated	
Saturn Awards	March 8, 2026	Best Supporting Actor in a Film	Jeff Goldblum	Nominated	
Saturn Awards	March 8, 2026	Best Supporting Actress in a Film	Ariana Grande	Nominated	
Saturn Awards	March 8, 2026	Best Film Music	John Powell and Stephen Schwartz	Nominated	
Saturn Awards	March 8, 2026	Best Film Production Design	Nathan Crowley and Lee Sandales	Nominated	
Saturn Awards	March 8, 2026	Best Film Costume Design	Paul Tazewell	Nominated	
Saturn Awards	March 8, 2026	Best Film Make-Up	Mark Coulier and Frances Hannon	Nominated	
Saturn Awards	March 8, 2026	Best Film Visual / Special Effects	Pablo Helman and Dale Newton	Nominated	
Savannah Film Festival	October 26, 2025	Vanguard Director Award	Jon M. Chu	Honored	
Screen Awards	December 24, 2025	Best Supporting Performance by an Actress – Film	Ariana Grande	Nominated	
Seattle Film Critics Society	December 15, 2025	Best Actress in a Supporting Role	Ariana Grande	Nominated	
Seattle Film Critics Society	December 15, 2025	Best Costume Design	Paul Tazewell	Nominated	
Set Decorators Society of America Awards	February 21, 2026	Best Achievement in Décor/Design of a Comedy or Musical Feature Film	Nathan Crowley and Lee Sandales	Won	
Society of Composers & Lyricists	February 6, 2026	Outstanding Original Score for a Studio Film	John Powell and Stephen Schwartz	Nominated	
Society of Composers & Lyricists	February 6, 2026	Outstanding Original Song for a Comedy or Musical Visual Media Production	"No Place Like Home" – Stephen Schwartz	Nominated	
Society of Composers & Lyricists	February 6, 2026	Outstanding Original Song for a Comedy or Musical Visual Media Production	"The Girl in the Bubble" – Stephen Schwartz	Nominated	
St. Louis Film Critics Association	December 14, 2025	Best Costume Design	Paul Tazewell	Nominated	
St. Louis Film Critics Association	December 14, 2025	Best Production Design	Nathan Crowley and Lee Sandales	Nominated	
St. Louis Film Critics Association	December 14, 2025	Best Soundtrack	Wicked: For Good – The Soundtrack	Nominated	
Utah Film Critics Association	January 17, 2026	Best Supporting Performance – Female	Ariana Grande	Nominated	
Visual Effects Society Awards	February 25, 2026	Outstanding Model in a Photoreal or Animated Project	Marco Chau, Giorgio Pennisi, Sowmya Ramakumar, Balazs Meszaros (For "Bison")	Nominated	
Washington D.C. Area Film Critics Association	December 7, 2025	Best Actress	Cynthia Erivo	Nominated	
Washington D.C. Area Film Critics Association	December 7, 2025	Best Supporting Actress	Ariana Grande	Nominated	
Washington D.C. Area Film Critics Association	December 7, 2025	Best Production Design	Nathan Crowley and Lee Sandales	Nominated	
Women Film Critics Circle	December 18, 2025	Josephine Baker Award	Wicked: For Good	Runner-up	
Yahoo! Japan Search Awards	December 3, 2025	Movie Category	Wicked: For Good	4th place	

== Future ==
In November 2024, Schwartz and Holzman stated they had discussed the possibility of "something" more associated with the Wicked film adaptation, but that it would not necessarily be a Wicked Part Three or Four. They were later reported to be working on a musical film adaptation of The Marvelous Land of Oz, tentatively titled Ozma, which would take place in the world of the original Oz books rather than the Wicked universe. As of October 2026, whether that project is the one that they were alluding to in 2024 or whether it's a separate project has not been confirmed.

Since the first film's release, the adaptation overall is in the process of evolving into a media franchise. The New York Times has reported that Universal Destinations & Experiences is considering theme park attractions based on the films, but no rides or attractions have been announced.

== See also ==
- Adaptations of The Wonderful Wizard of Oz
- List of films about witchcraft
- List of films produced back-to-back
- List of films split into multiple parts
