= Stephen Schwartz =

American theatre composer (born 1948)

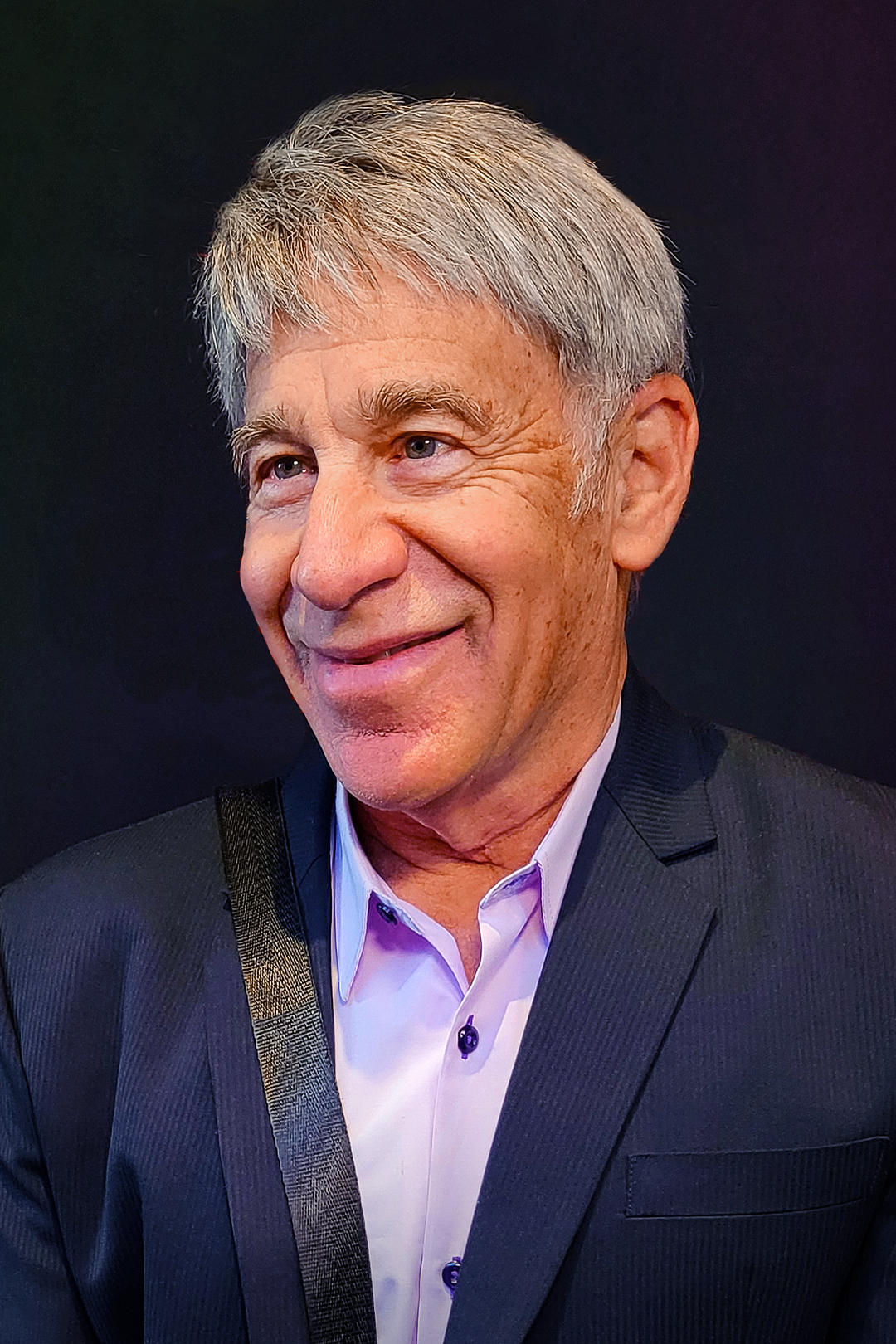
- Schwartz at the opening night of Funny Girl at the August Wilson Theatre in Midtown Manhattan, New York, April 2022
- Born: Stephen Lawrence Schwartz; March 6, 1948 (age 78); New York City, New York, U.S.
- Education: Carnegie Mellon University (BFA)
- Occupations: Lyricist; composer
- Years active: 1969–present
- Spouse: Carole Piasecki (m. 1969, divorced)
- Children: 2
- Awards: Full list

Stephen Lawrence Schwartz (born March 6, 1948) is an American musical theatre composer and lyricist. In a career spanning over five decades, Schwartz has written hit musicals including Godspell (1971), Pippin (1972), and Wicked (2003). He has contributed lyrics to successful films including Pocahontas (1995), The Hunchback of Notre Dame (1996), The Prince of Egypt (1998, music and lyrics), Enchanted (2007), Disenchanted (2022), and the two-part adaptation of Wicked (2024–2025, music and lyrics).

Schwartz has earned numerous accolades including three Grammy Awards, three Academy Awards, and a Golden Globe Award. He has received nominations for six Tony Awards, and a Laurence Olivier Award. He received the Tony Award's Isabelle Stevenson Award in 2015. His son, Scott, directed The Hunchback of Notre Dame and The Prince of Egypt.

== Early life and education ==
Schwartz is Jewish and was born in New York City to Sheila Lorna (née Siegel), a teacher, and Stanley Leonard Schwartz, a businessman. He grew up in the Williston Park area of Nassau County on Long Island where he graduated from Mineola High School in Garden City Park, New York in 1964. While attending Carnegie Mellon University in Pittsburgh, he composed and directed an early version of Pippin (entitled Pippin, Pippin) with the student-run theater group Scotch'n'Soda. He graduated from Carnegie Mellon in 1968 with a Bachelor of Fine Arts degree in drama.

== Career ==
=== Early career ===
After returning to New York City, Stephen Schwartz went to work as a producer for RCA Records, however shortly afterwards, he began to work in Broadway theater. He was asked to be the musical director of the first American rock opera, The Survival of St. Joan. He was credited as the producer of the two-record concept recording with the progressive rock group Smoke Rise on Paramount Records. His first major credit was the title song for the play Butterflies Are Free; the song was also eventually used in the movie version.

In 1971, he wrote music and lyrics for Godspell, for which he won several awards including two Grammys. For the musical's Toronto production in 1972, he asked Paul Shaffer to be the musical director, thus starting Shaffer's career. Godspell was followed by the English language texts, in collaboration with Leonard Bernstein, for Bernstein's Mass, which opened the John F. Kennedy Center for the Performing Arts in Washington, D.C. In 1972, the long-running Pippin premiered on Broadway. Schwartz had begun writing songs for Pippin while in college, although none of the songs from the college version ended up in the Broadway production. Both Pippin and Godspell continue to be frequently produced.

In 1974, Schwartz wrote music and lyrics of The Magic Show, which ran for just under 2,000 performances. By mid-1974, at age 26, he had three smash hit musicals playing in the state simultaneously.

Next were the music and lyrics of The Baker's Wife, which closed before reaching Broadway after an out-of-town tryout tour in 1976. However, the cast album attained cult status, which led to several subsequent productions including a London production directed by Trevor Nunn in 1990; one at the Paper Mill Playhouse in Millburn, New Jersey in 2005; and another at Classic Stage Company in 2025.

In 1978, Schwartz's next Broadway project was a musical version of Studs Terkel's Working, which he adapted and directed, winning a Drama Desk Award as best director and for which he contributed four songs. He co-directed the television production, which was presented as part of the American Playhouse series on PBS. In 1977, Schwartz wrote a children's book called The Perfect Peach. In the 1980s, he wrote songs for a one-act musical for children, The Trip, which 20 years later was revised, expanded, and produced as Captain Louie. He then wrote music for three of the songs of the Off-Broadway revue Personals, and lyrics to Charles Strouse's music for the musical Rags.

=== Later career ===
In 1991, Schwartz wrote the music and lyrics for the musical Children of Eden. He then began working in film, collaborating with composer Alan Menken on the scores for the Disney animated feature Pocahontas (1995), for which he received two Academy Awards and The Hunchback of Notre Dame (1996). He provided songs for DreamWorks' first musical animated feature, The Prince of Egypt (1998), winning another Academy Award for the song "When You Believe". He wrote music and lyrics for the original television musical, Geppetto (2000), seen on The Wonderful World of Disney on ABC. A stage adaptation of the musical premiered in June 2006 at The Coterie Theatre in Kansas City, Missouri and was titled Geppetto and Son. It is known as Disney's My Son Pinocchio: Geppetto's Musical Tale. A version created for young performers, titled Geppetto & Son, Jr. had its world premiere on July 17, 2009, at the Lyric Theatre in Stuart, Florida. It was presented by the StarStruck Performing Arts Center.

In 2003, Schwartz returned to Broadway, as composer and lyricist for Wicked, a musical based on the novel Wicked: The Life and Times of the Wicked Witch of the West telling the story of the Oz characters from the point of view of the witches. He won a Grammy for his work as composer and lyricist and producer of Wicked's cast recording. On March 23, 2006, the Broadway production of Wicked passed the 1,000 performance mark, making Schwartz one of four composers (the other three being Andrew Lloyd Webber, Jerry Herman, and Richard Rodgers) to have three shows last that long on Broadway (the other two were Pippin and The Magic Show). In 2007, Schwartz joined Herman as one of only two composer/lyricists to have three shows run longer than 1,500 performances on Broadway.

After Wicked, Schwartz contributed music and lyrics for a new musical which was commissioned to celebrate the bicentennial of the birth of Hans Christian Andersen. The production, titled Mit Eventyr or "My Fairytale", opened at the Gladsaxe Theatre in Copenhagen, Denmark in the fall of 2005. The American premiere of My Fairytale took place in the summer of 2011 at the PCPA Theatrefest of California and was directed by Stephen Schwartz's son, Scott Schwartz.

Stephen Schwartz returned to Hollywood in 2007 and wrote lyrics for the hit Disney film Enchanted, again collaborating with Menken. Three songs from the film, "Happy Working Song", "That's How You Know", and "So Close" were nominated for the Academy Award for Best Original Song. He wrote the theme song for the Playhouse Disney show Johnny and the Sprites, starring John Tartaglia. Schwartz wrote incidental music for Scott Schwartz's adaptation of Willa Cather's My Ántonia.

On several occasions prior to 2008, Stephen Schwartz had reached out to Tim Dang who was the longtime artistic director of Asian-Pacific Islander theater company, East West Players (EWP) in Los Angeles. The collaboration led to the conception of a new version of Pippin, aesthetically inspired by Japanese anime and musically inspired by hip-hop. The production was a record-breaking hit and remained the highest grossing production in EWP's history for an entire decade before being dethroned by Allegiance in 2018. In 2008, Applause Theatre and Cinema Books published the first Schwartz biography titled Defying Gravity, by Carol de Giere. It is a comprehensive look at his career and life, and includes sections on how to write for musical theater.

Turning to the pop world in 2009, Schwartz collaborated with John Ondrasik in writing two songs on the Five for Fighting album Slice, the title track in addition to "Above the Timberline". Ondrasik became familiar with Schwartz based on his daughter's repeated attendance at performances of and affection for the musical Wicked. In September 2011, Northlight Theatre in Skokie, Illinois premiered Schwartz's new musical, Snapshots, featuring music and lyrics by Schwartz, book by David Stern, and was directed by Ken Sawyer. It blended together "some of the best-loved music with some of the genuinely wonderful lesser known gems of (the) renowned Broadway composer." On March 22, 2012, the San Francisco Gay Men's Chorus released "Testimony", composed by Schwartz with lyrics taken from submissions to Dan Savage's It Gets Better Project. In March 2015, Princess Cruises announced a partnership with Schwartz for the development of four shows over three years. The first will be a magic themed revue of Schwartz's music, titled Magic To Do, including a new song written for the show.

Schwartz returned to write the lyrics for a sequel to Enchanted, titled Disenchanted, and will do the same for a live-action remake of The Hunchback of Notre Dame. In April 2020 he participated in a fund-raising video called Saturday Night Seder which featured an "all-star" cast of performers, composers, and religious leaders broadcasting from their home computers and cellphones due to the practice of "social distancing" heavily practiced in response to the coronavirus/COVID-19 pandemic. The video was about the history of Passover through stories, song, comedy and memories. It raised money for the CDC Foundation. In 2023, the Metropolitan Opera celebrated Schwartz's 75th birthday with a special benefit concert featuring popular Broadway and opera stars. In 2025, it was announced that Schwartz would receive the Johnny Mercer award at the Songwriters Hall of Fame in Los Angeles.

== Personal life ==
Schwartz and Carole Piasecki married on June 6, 1969 and they have two children, Jessica and Scott. They are no longer married, and Schwartz has been in a long-term relationshp with Broadway actor and frequent collaborator Michael McCorry Rose since c. 2009; (Note: Schwartz told the Bay Area Reporter in April 2026 that he and Rose had been "long-term partners going on 17 years".) he stated that "binary identifications can get complicated ... I tend to be taciturn, if you will, about all things, politics and religion and sexuality".

In 2009, Schwartz was elected president of the Dramatists Guild of America, succeeding John Weidman. Schwartz stepped down in 2014 and Doug Wright took his place.

== Major works ==
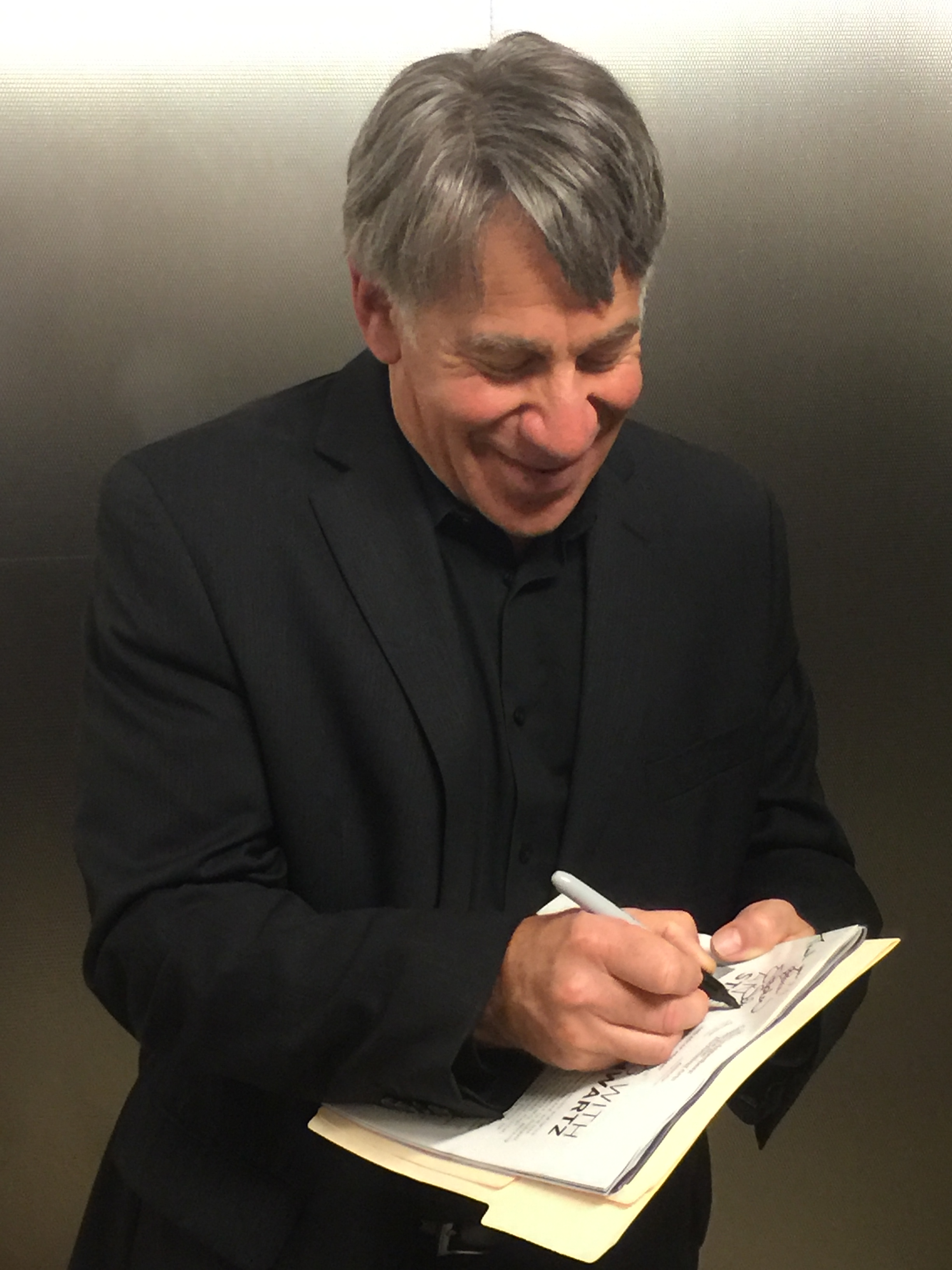

=== Stage ===
- Godspell (1971) – composer, lyricist
- Mass (1971) – English texts (in collaboration with Leonard Bernstein)
- Pippin (1972) – composer, lyricist
- The Magic Show (1974) – composer, lyricist
- The Baker's Wife (1976) – composer, lyricist
- Working (1978) – adaptation, direction, composer, lyricist of 4 songs
- Personals (1985) – composer of three songs
- The Trip (1986) – children's show; composer, lyricist
- Rags (1986) – lyricist to Charles Strouse
- Children of Eden (1991) – composer, lyricist
- The Hunchback of Notre Dame (1999 Berlin) – lyricist to Alan Menken (stage version of Disney's The Hunchback of Notre Dame); Michael Kunze translated the lyrics to German; English version in 2013, adapted from the Disney animated film
- Wicked (2003) – composer, lyricist
- Tiruvasakam (2005) – English translation of selected verses of the Tamil hymn on Lord Siva by Manickavasagar; Indian composer Ilaiyaraaja wrote the music.
- Snapshots (2005)
- Captain Louie (2005)
- Mit Eventyr – My Fairy Tale (2005) – contributed six songs
- Séance on a Wet Afternoon (2009) – opera
- Schikaneder (2016 Vienna)
- The Prince of Egypt (2017) – composer, lyricist, based on the DreamWorks animated film
- The Queen of Versailles (2024) – composer, lyricist

=== Recordings ===
- Reluctant Pilgrim (1997)
- Uncharted Territory (2001)

=== Books ===
- Defying Gravity (2008) – biography

=== Film ===
- Butterflies Are Free (1969) – title song (play and movie)
- Godspell (1973) – composer, lyricist
- Pocahontas (1995) – lyricist
- The Hunchback of Notre Dame (1996) – lyricist
- The Prince of Egypt (1998) – composer, lyricist
- Enchanted (2007) – lyricist
- Disenchanted (2022) – lyricist
- Wicked (2024) – composer, lyricist, executive producer, cameo as Emerald City Guard
- Wicked: For Good (2025) – composer, lyricist, executive producer

=== Television ===
- Working (1982) – composer, lyricist, adaptation, director
- Geppetto (2000) – composer, lyricist
- Johnny and the Sprites (2005) – theme song

=== Choral ===
- The Chanukah Song (We are Lights)
- Kéramos
- Thiruvasakam in Symphony (2005)
- Testimony (2012)

== Awards and nominations ==
Schwartz has won many major awards in his field including three Oscars, three Grammys, four Drama Desk Awards, a Golden Globe Award, the Richard Rodgers Award for Excellence in Musical Theater and a self-described "tiny handful of tennis trophies". He has received six Tony Award nominations, for Wicked, Pippin, and Godspell, music/lyrics; Rags, lyrics; and Working, music/lyrics and book. In 2015, he received an honorary Tony Award, the Isabelle Stevenson Award, for his commitment to serving artists and fostering new talent.

In April 2008, Schwartz was given a star on the Hollywood Walk of Fame. In 2009, he was inducted into the Songwriters Hall of Fame. Also in 2009, he was inducted into the American Theater Hall of Fame. The induction ceremony took place on the night of January 25, 2010. Schwartz received an Honorary Doctor of Fine Arts degree from Carnegie Mellon University in May 2015.
