= List of Jonathan Bailey performances =

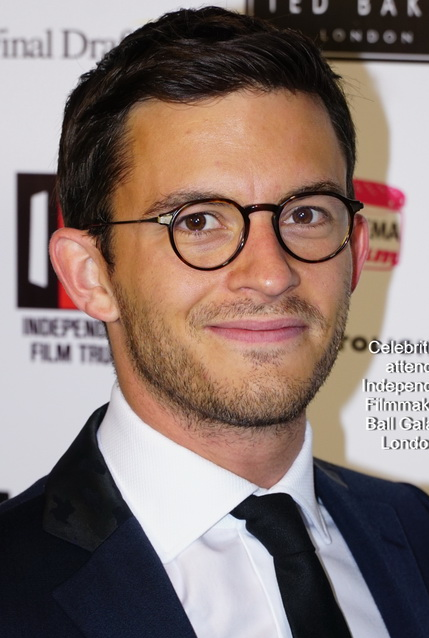
Bailey in 2015

English actor Jonathan Bailey began his career as a child actor in Royal Shakespeare Company productions and by eight was performing as Gavroche in a West End production of Les Misérables. He has since starred in contemporary plays such as The York Realist in 2018 and Cock in 2022; in classical plays like Othello in 2013 and Richard II in 2025; as well as in musicals, namely the London revival of The Last Five Years in 2016 and the West End gender-swapped revival of Company for which he won the Laurence Olivier Award for Best Actor in a Supporting Role in a Musical in 2019.

On screen, Bailey starred in the action-adventure series Leonardo (2011–2012) and the musical-comedy Groove High (2012–2013) before becoming known for the crime drama Broadchurch (2013–2015) and the comedy Crashing (2016). He gained wider recognition for his roles in the Regency romance series Bridgerton (2020–present) and the political miniseries Fellow Travelers (2023) which won him a Critics' Choice Television Award for Best Supporting Actor as well as a nomination for a Primetime Emmy Award for Outstanding Supporting Actor. He played Fiyero in the musical fantasy films Wicked (2024) and Wicked: For Good (2025) for which was nominated for a Screen Actors Guild Award for Outstanding Performance by a Male Actor in a Supporting Role. He also played Dr. Henry Loomis in the science fiction thriller film Jurassic World Rebirth (2025).

== Credits ==
=== Theatre ===
Year	Title	Role	Director	Venue	Ref.
1995	A Christmas Carol	Child Scrooge / Tiny Tim (alt)	Ian Judge	Royal Shakespeare Company (RSC) at the Barbican Theatre	
1996	Les Enfants du Paradis	Little Baptiste	Simon Callow	RSC at the Barbican Theatre	
1997–1998	Les Misérables	Gavroche	John Caird	Palace Theatre, London	
2001–2002	King John	Prince Arthur	Gregory Doran	RSC at the Barbican Theatre	
2006	Beautiful Thing	Jamie	Toby Frow	Sound Theatre	
2007	Pretend You Have Big Buildings	Leon	Jo Combes and Sarah Frankcom	Royal Exchange, Manchester	
2008	The Mother Ship	Elliot	Ben Payne	Birmingham Rep Theatre	
2008	Girl with a Pearl Earring	Pieter	Joe Dowling	Cambridge Arts Theatre and Theatre Royal Haymarket	
2009	The House of Special Purpose	Alexi	Howard Davies	Chichester Festival Theatre	
2011, 2012	South Downs	Duffield	Jeremy Herrin	Chichester Festival Theatre / Harold Pinter Theatre	
2013	The Golden Story	Romeo	Nicholas Hytner	Buckingham Palace	
2013	Othello	Cassio	Nicholas Hytner	Royal National Theatre	
2013	National Theatre Live: 50 Years On Stage	Valentine	Nicholas Hytner	Royal National Theatre	
2013	American Psycho	Tim Price	Rupert Goold	Almeida Theatre	
2016	The Last Five Years	Jamie Wellerstein	Jason Robert Brown	St. James Theatre	
2017	King Lear	Edgar	Jonathan Murphy	Chichester Festival Theatre	
2017	Certain Young Men	Andrew	Peter Gill	Royal National Theatre	
2018	The York Realist	John	Robert Hastie	Donmar Warehouse / Crucible Theatre	
2018–2019	Company	Jamie	Marianne Elliott	Gielgud Theatre	
2022	Cock	John	Marianne Elliott	Ambassadors Theatre	
2025	Richard II	Richard II	Nicholas Hytner	Bridge Theatre	

=== Television ===
Year	Title	Role	Notes	Ref.
1997	Bramwell	William Kilshaw	Series 3, episode 6	
1997	Bright Hair	Ben Devenish	Television film	
1998	Alice through the Looking Glass	Lewis	Television film	
2001	Baddiel's Syndrome	Josh	Main role	
2003	Ferrari	Alfredo Ferrari	Television film	
2004	Playing a Part: The Story of Claude Cahun	Man Ray	Documentary film	
2005	The Golden Hour	Stephen Martin	Episode 4	
2005	Walk Away and I Stumble	Justin	Television film	
2007	Doctors	Johnno Mitchum	Episode: "See You in the Morning"	
2008	The Bill	Chris Villiers	Episode: "The Hit"	
2009	Off the Hook	Danny Gordon	Main role	
2010	Lewis	Titus Mortmaigne	Episode: "The Dead of Winter"	
2011	Campus	Flatpack	Main role	
2011–2012	Leonardo	Leonardo da Vinci	Main role	
2012	Pramface	Glynn	Episode: "Edinburgh... in Scotland"	
2012	Me and Mrs Jones	Alfie	Main role	
2012–2013	Groove High	Tom Mason	Main role	
2013	Some Girls	Nick the Counsellor	Series 2, episode 1	
2013	Fifty Years on Stage	Valentine Coverly	TV movie; Segment: "Arcadia"	
2013–2015	Broadchurch	Olly Stevens	16 episodes	
2014	Doctor Who	Psi	Series 8, episode 5: “Time Heist”	
2014–2017	W1A	Jack Patterson	Recurring role (series 1); Main role (series 2–3)	
2016	Crashing	Sam	Main role	
2016	Hooten & the Lady	Edward	6 episodes	
2017	Chewing Gum	Ash	Series 2, episode 2: “Replacements”	
2018	Jack Ryan	Lance Miller	2 episodes	
2020–present	Bridgerton	Anthony Bridgerton, 9th Viscount Bridgerton	Main role; 21 episodes	
2022	RuPaul's Drag Race: UK vs. the World	Himself	Guest judge (Series 1); Episode: "West End Wendys"	
2023	Fellow Travelers	Tim Laughlin	Main role; Miniseries	
2024	Variety Studio: Actors on Actors	Himself	Series 20, episode 3	
2024	The Traitors: The Movie	Harry	For Comic Relief	
2024	Heartstopper	Jack Maddox	Series 3, episode 6: “Body”	
2024	Defying Gravity: The Curtain Rises on Wicked	Himself	Behind-the-scenes special	
2025	Wicked: One Wonderful Night	Himself		
2025	Variety Studio: Actors on Actors	Himself	Series 23, episode 3	

=== Film ===
Key
†	Denotes films that have not yet been released

Year	Title	Role	Notes	Ref.
2004	Five Children and It	Cyril		
2007	Permanent Vacation	Max Bury		
2007	St Trinian's	Caspar		
2007	Elizabeth: The Golden Age	Courtier		
2013	NT Live: Othello	Cassio	Recording	
2014	Testament of Youth	Geoffrey Thurlow		
2016	The Young Messiah	Herod		
2017	The Mercy	Ian Wheeler		
2021	Best Birthday Ever	Father	Voice role	
2024	Wicked	Fiyero Tigelaar		
2024	Up the Catalogue	Jeremy		
2025	Jurassic World Rebirth	Dr. Henry Loomis		
2025	Wicked: For Good	Fiyero Tigelaar / The Scarecrow		
TBA	Monsanto †	Brent Wisner	Filming	
TBA	Lincoln in the Bardo †	Roger Bevins (voice)	Post-production	
TBA	Pumping Black †	Taylor Mace	Filming	

=== Audio ===
Year	Title	Role	Notes	Ref.
2013	Life in the Freezer	Neil	BBC Radio 4	
2013	South Downs	Jeremy Duffield	BBC Radio 4	
2013	Ed Reardon's Week: The Intern	Alex	BBC Radio 4	
2014	By a Young Officer: Churchill on the North West Frontier	Browne-Clayton / Capt of the 35th	BBC Radio 4	
2015	Red and Blue	Mark Longham	BBC Radio 4	
2016	The Forsytes	Jon	BBC Radio 4	
2016	Deliverers	Lee	BBC Radio 4	
2017	Just One Damned Thing After Another	David Sussman	Audible	
2017	The New Adventures of Bernice Summerfield Volume 04: Ruler of the Universe	Lakis	Big Finish Productions	
2017	The War Master: Only the Good	Marigold Lane Computer	Big Finish Productions	
2018	Cast Long Shadows	Narrator	Audiobook	
2018	Home Front	Daniel Marriott	BBC Radio 4	
2018	Somewhere Beyond the Sea	Narrator	Audiobook	
2020	The Flip Side	Narrator	Audiobook	
2020	Hell Cats	Captain Jack Rackham	Audible	
2021	Hot White Heist	Eddie	Audible	
2022	Love Letter From an Englishman	Narrator	Calm	
2023	The Showstopper	Narrator	BBC Radio 2	
2026	Dracula	Count Dracula	Audible	

=== Video games ===
Year	Title	Voice role	Ref.
2014	Forza Horizon 2	Dan Williams	
2015	Everybody's Gone to the Rapture	Rhys Shipley	
2017	Final Fantasy XIV: Stormblood	Enigmatic Figure	
2019	Anthem	Gunther, Off-Duty Sentinel, Fort Newcomer, Customer, Laborer	
2019	Final Fantasy XIV: Shadowbringers	Crystal Exarch / G'raha Tia	
2021	Final Fantasy XIV: Endwalker	G'raha Tia, Growingway	
2024	Final Fantasy XIV: Dawntrail	G'raha Tia	
TBA	Squadron 42	Aaron Seetow	

=== Cast recordings ===
Year	Title	Notes	Ref.
2016	American Psycho (Original Cast Recording)	Concord Music Group	
2019	Company (London Cast Recording)	Warner Classics	
2024	Wicked: The Soundtrack	Republic Records and Verve Records	
2025	Wicked: For Good – The Soundtrack	Republic Records and Verve Records	

== See also ==
- List of awards and nominations received by Jonathan Bailey
