= List of awards and nominations received by Jonathan Bailey =

Jonathan Bailey awards and nominations
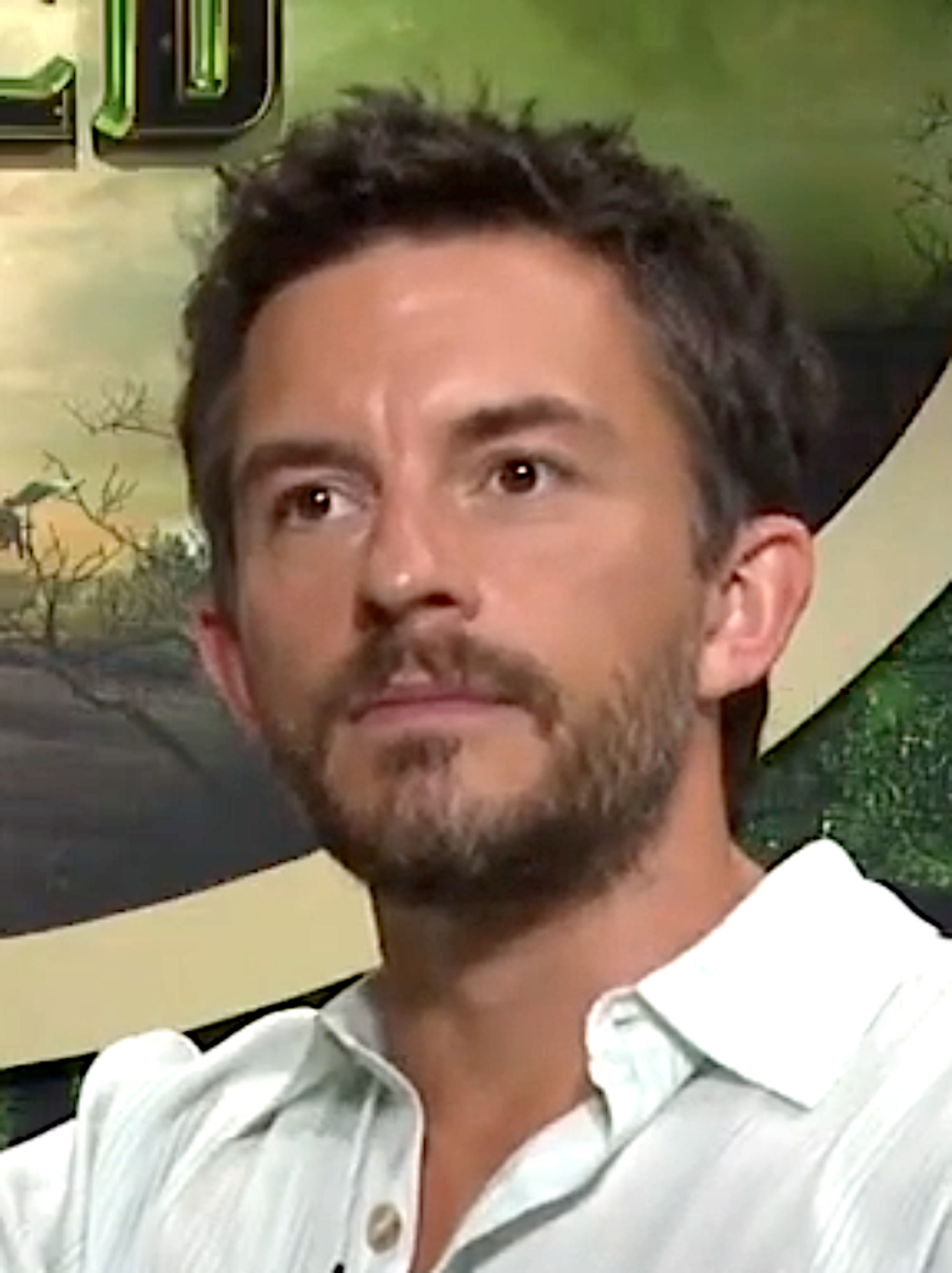
- Bailey in 2024
Awards and nominations
Award	Wins	Nominations
Primetime Emmy Awards	0	1
Laurence Olivier Awards	1	1
Actor Award	0	4
Critics Choice Awards	1	2

Jonathan Bailey is an English actor who has received accolades across his work on film, television, and theatre including a Laurence Olivier Award, a Critics' Choice Television Award, as well as a nominations for a Primetime Emmy Award and four Actor Awards.

Bailey's performance in the West End gender-swapped revival of Company won him the Laurence Olivier Award for Best Actor in a Supporting Role in a Musical in 2019. He won a Critics' Choice Television Award as well as a nomination for a Primetime Emmy Award for Best Supporting Actor for his role in the political miniseries Fellow Travelers (2023). He played Fiyero in the musical fantasy film Wicked (2024) and earned him a nomination for an Actor Award for Outstanding Performance by a Male Actor in a Supporting Role.

== Major associations ==
=== Primetime Emmy Awards ===
The Primetime Emmy Awards are presented in recognition of excellence in American primetime television programming bestowed by the Academy of Television Arts & Sciences (ATAS).

Year	Category	Nominated work	Result	Ref.
2024	Outstanding Supporting Actor in a Limited or Anthology Series or Movie	Fellow Travellers	Nominated	

=== Laurence Olivier Awards ===
The Laurence Olivier Awards are presented annually by the Society of London Theatre to recognise excellence in professional theatre in London.

Year	Category	Nominated work	Result	Ref.
2019	Best Actor in a Supporting Role in a Musical	Company	Won	

=== Actor Awards ===
The Actor Awards are organized by the Screen Actors Guild‐American Federation of Television and Radio Artists. First awarded in 1995, the awards aim to recognize excellent achievements in film and television.

Year	Category	Nominated work	Result	Ref.
2021	Outstanding Performance by an Ensemble in a Drama Series	Bridgerton	Nominated	
2025	Outstanding Performance by an Ensemble in a Drama Series	Bridgerton	Nominated	
2025	Outstanding Performance by a Male Actor in a Supporting Role	Wicked	Nominated	
2025	Outstanding Performance by a Cast in a Motion Picture	Wicked	Nominated	

=== Critics' Choice Awards ===
The Critics' Choice Awards are presented annually since 1995 by the Broadcast Film Critics Association for outstanding achievements in the film and television industry.

Year	Category	Nominated work	Result	Ref.
Television
2024	Outstanding Supporting Actor in a Limited or Anthology Series or Movie	Fellow Travellers	Won	
Film
2025	Best Acting Ensemble	Wicked	Nominated	

== Other awards and nominations ==
=== Astra Awards ===
Year	Category	Nominated work	Result	Ref.
Television
2024	Outstanding Supporting Actor in a Limited or Anthology Series or Movie	Fellow Travellers	Won	
Film
2024	Best Supporting Actor	Wicked	Nominated	
2024	Best Cast Ensemble	Wicked	Nominated	
2025	Best Supporting Actor	Wicked: For Good	Nominated	
2025	Best Cast Ensemble	Wicked: For Good	Nominated	

=== BroadwayWorld UK Awards ===
Year	Category	Nominated work	Result	Ref.
2018	Best Supporting Actor in a New Production of a Musical	Company	Nominated	

=== Dorian Awards ===
Year	Category	Nominated work	Result	Ref.
Television
2024	Best Supporting TV Performance – Drama	Fellow Travellers	Won	
Film
2025	Rising Star Award	Wicked	Won	

=== Evening Standard Theatre Awards ===
Year	Category	Nominated work	Result	Ref.
2012	Outstanding Newcomer	South Downs	Nominated	
2025	Best Actor	Richard II	Nominated	

=== Metro Pride Awards ===
Year	Category	Result	Ref.
2025	Celebrity of the Year	Nominated	

=== NAACP Image Awards ===
Year	Category	Nominated work	Result	Ref.
Film
2025	Best Ensemble	Wicked	Nominated	

=== National Television Awards ===
Year	Category	Nominated work	Result	Ref.
2022	Best Drama Performance	Bridgerton	Nominated	

=== Rainbow Honours ===
Year	Category	Nominated work	Result	Ref.
2022	Media Moment of the Year	Bridgerton	Nominated	

=== Satellite Awards ===
Year	Category	Nominated work	Result	Ref.
Television
2024	Best Supporting Actor – Series, Miniseries or Television Film	Fellow Travellers	Won	

=== TV Choice Awards ===
Year	Category	Nominated work	Result	Ref.
2022	Best Actor	Bridgerton	Nominated	

=== WhatsOnStage Awards ===
Year	Category	Nominated work	Result	Ref.
2019	Best Supporting Actor in a Musical	Company	Nominated	
2023	Best Performer in a Play	Cock	Nominated	
2025	Best Performer in a Play	Richard II	Won	

== Critics associations awards ==
Award	Year	Category	Nominated work	Result	Ref.
Alliance of Women Film Journalists	2024	Best Ensemble Cast	Wicked	Nominated	
Chicago Indie Critics Windie Award	2025	Best Ensemble	Wicked	Nominated	
Columbus Film Critics Association	2025	Best Ensemble	Wicked	Nominated	
Critics Association Of Central Florida	2025	Best Cast	Wicked	Won	
Houston Film Critics Society	2025	Best Ensemble	Wicked	Nominated	
Las Vegas Film Critics Society	2024	Best Ensemble	Wicked	Nominated	
Michigan Movie Critics Guild	2024	Best Ensemble	Wicked	Nominated	
Music City Film Critics Association	2025	Best Ensemble	Wicked	Nominated	
New York Film Critics Online	2024	Best Ensemble	Wicked	Nominated	
North Carolina Film Critics Association	2024	Best Acting Ensemble	Wicked	Nominated	
North Dakota Film Society	2025	Best Ensemble	Wicked	Nominated	
North Texas Film Critics Association	2024	Gary Murray Award (Best Ensemble)	Wicked	Nominated	
San Diego Film Critics Society	2024	Best Ensemble	Wicked	Nominated	
St. Louis Film Critics Association	2024	Best Ensemble	Wicked	Nominated	
Utah Film Critics Association	2024	Best Ensemble Cast	Wicked	Nominated	
Washington D.C. Area Film Critics Association	2024	Best Acting Ensemble	Wicked	Nominated	

== See also ==
- List of Jonathan Bailey performances
