= South Downs (disambiguation) =

South Downs may refer to:

- the South Downs, a geological feature in Sussex, and geographically related topics:
  - Arundel and South Downs (UK Parliament constituency)
  - South Downs National Park
  - South Downs Way, a footpath
  - South Downs College
- South Downs (play), a 2011 play by David Hare
