= Roxane Hayward =

South African actress (born 1991)

- Born: Roxane Josephine Hayward; 7 May 1991 (age 34); Johannesburg, South Africa
- Occupation(s): Actress, model, singer
- Years active: 2006–present

Roxane Hayward (born Roxane Josephine Hayward, 7 May 1991) is a South African actress. She has appeared in numerous South African, British and American television shows which include Leonardo for CBBC, Beaver Falls for E4 and Blood Drive as well as feature films, including Death Race 3: Inferno. In theatre, Hayward has played leading roles for some of South Africa's most respected theatres including Shakespeare In Love at Eric Abraham's Fugard Theatre.

In 2015, Hayward played the role of Susanna White in the Nat Geo scripted two-part movie event Saints and Strangers, produced by Sony Pictures Television, which premiered in November 2015. In June 2015, Roxane completed filming on the action/thriller feature film Accident, in which she played the lead role, Caroline. The film premiered in December 2017.

Hayward is a spokeswomen for human rights and self-defense having hosted seminars around South Africa focusing on empowering individuals through self-defense skills. In 2017, Hayward made her directorial debut for the Public Service Announcement titled Open Your Eyes HeardPSA, which aimed at creating awareness on human trafficking and modern-day slavery.

== Early life ==
Hayward was born in Johannesburg, South Africa, to parents who supported her decision to take on acting as a career. She started her theatrical training at the age of six along with dancing, singing and piano lessons. She joined her first acting agency at six-year old and then booked her first television commercial. After high school, Hayward started studying drama, dancing and musical theatre.

== Career ==
In 2002 when Hayward was 11 years old, she was cast in her first television commercial. Hayward then started her acting career in the CBC television drama series Jozi-H in which she played a young, troubled teenager named Daphne who was admitted into the Johannesburg General Hospital for a drug overdose. Hayward had a guest role in episode 9 of the series Smile, which premiered in 2006 and ran for one season. Shortly after filming Jozi-H, Hayward appeared in SABC's Isidingo as a young victim of abuse named Chloe.

In 2011, Hayward made her first appearance on British television playing the role of a summer camp counselor in the Channel 4 comedy series Beaver Falls. Hayward was then cast as a supporting role in her first feature film Death Race 3: Inferno, where she acts alongside Dougray Scott, Ving Rhames and Danny Trejo. Death Race 3: Inferno was produced by Universal Pictures and released in 2012.

Hayward landed her first lead role on international television in the CBBC series Leonardo in 2012. Hayward played the role of the young Angelica Visconti who is caught in a love triangle while betrothed to the teenage Lorenzo de' Medici. Leonardo was filmed in Cape Town, South Africa for British television. In 2014, Hayward was cast as the role of Irin in the NBC series Dominion. She appears in the episodes Broken Places and Godspeed.

In 2015, Hayward was cast in the NatGeo two-part movie event, produced by Sony and Little Engine Productions titled Saints and Strangers. Hayward plays the role of the historical figure, Susanna White; one of the women aboard the Mayflower which arrived on North shore of Massachusetts in the 1600s. She acts alongside Barry Sloane, Vincent Kartheiser, Anna Camp and Ron Livingston. At the premiere of Saints and Strangers at the Saban Theatre in Beverly Hills, Hayward was quoted saying, "I’ve done quite a few period pieces before but because this is for NatGeo this is so historically correct: every little detail, from hair and makeup to what they said, how they said it, the sets, to everything, was just historically spot on. And being around that was just incredible. It felt like you would step back in time every time you’re on set."

Released in December 2017, Hayward stars in the action/thriller feature film Accident.

Hayward plays the role of Mimi Kox in the exploitation-style SyFy series Blood Drive. The series premiered on US television in June 2017.

At the start of 2016, Hayward started Muay Thai training with two-time world champion Quentin Chong. She has since hosted many workshops and seminars focusing on self-defence and has become a spokeswoman for human rights and empowerment in South Africa. This interest led to her directorial debut where she wrote, produced and directed a public service announcement to raise awareness on human trafficking and modern-day slavery. The PSA titled Open Your Eyes HeardPSA was created for HeardPSA, a platform created by the Global Sustainability Network to be broadcast on CNN. It was voted second worldwide an international PSA competition with a panel of judges including Quincy Jones, Wesley Snipes and Joseph Fiennes. It was broadcast internationally as well as on the South Africa network SABC 3

Hayward returned to the stage in October 2017 where she played the lead role of Viola De Lesseps in the comedy Shakespeare In Love at the Fugard Theatre. The production played to sold-out houses and critical acclaim from press and audiences alike and was extended by overwhelming demand. Hayward received rave reviews for her portrayal of the same role that won Gwyneth Paltrow an Academy Award where critics said, "Roxane Hayward’s Lady Viola de Lesseps starts off timidly and slowly builds into the best part of the production. I found myself wanting her to take centre stage in every scene she was in.". The production was nominated for three Fleur du Cap Awards including "Best Performance By An Ensemble".

== Filmography ==
=== Film ===
Year	Title	Role	Notes
2011	Death Race 3: Inferno	Prudence	
2013	Bordering on Bad Behavior	Sarah	
2017	Accident	Caroline	

=== Television ===
Year	Title	Role	Notes
2006	Jozi-H	Daphne	Episode: "Smile"
2007	Isidingo	Chloe	2 episodes
2011	Beaver Falls	Louisa	Episode: 1.3
2012	Leonardo	Angelica Visconti	6 episodes
2014	Dominion	Irin	2 episodes
2015	Saints & Strangers	Susanna White	Two-part movie event
2017	Blood Drive	Mimi Kox	2 episodes
2017	Open Your Eyes HeardPSA	Self	Public Service Announcement

=== Music videos ===
Year	Artist	Title
2011	Dash Berlin	"Go It Alone"
