= I Was Looking at the Ceiling and Then I Saw the Sky =

1995 song play

- "Song play" by John Adams
- Librettist: June Jordan
- Premiere: 3 May 1995; Zellerbach Playhouse, University of California, Berkeley

I Was Looking at the Ceiling and Then I Saw the Sky is a 1995 "song play" with music composed by John Adams and a libretto by June Jordan.

The work is scored for three mezzo sopranos, high tenor, tenor and two baritones, accompanied by an ensemble comprising two reed players (clarinet, bass clarinet, alto saxophone), three keyboards (piano, keyboard samplers), acoustic and electric guitars, electric bass guitar (doubling on double bass) and drum set (doubling on MIDI drums).

== Summary ==
The story takes place in the aftermath of the 1994 earthquake in Los Angeles, and covers the reactions of all characters to the event.

The main characters are seven young Americans all living in Los Angeles but from different social and ethnic backgrounds.

== Style ==
According to the composer, the all song and ensemble piece is "a Broadwaystyle show" fused with gospel, pop ballad, the blues, doo-wop and popular song.

== Productions ==
A revival ran at Theatre Royal Stratford East, London, from 2 to 17 July 2010, co-produced with the Barbican Centre. The production was directed by Kerry Michael and Matthew Xia, with musical direction by Clark Rundell and choreography by Jason Pennycooke. The cast comprised Jason Denton as David, Cynthia Erivo as Leila, Leon Lopez as Dewain, Anna Mateo as Consuelo, Stewart Charlesworth as Mike, Natasha J. Barnes as Tiffany and Colin Ryan as Rick.

== See also ==
- Contemporary opera
- Minimalism (music)
- Culture of Los Angeles
