= Flora Spencer-Longhurst =

British actress

- Born: 1985 or 1986 (age 39–40); Birmingham, England
- Occupation: Actress
- Years active: 2005–present

Flora Spencer-Longhurst (born 1985 or 1986) is an English actress. She is known for her roles in the CBBC series Leonardo (2011), and the FX series The Bastard Executioner (2015).

== Early life and education ==
Spencer-Longhurst joined the National Youth Music Theatre at age eleven. She subsequently studied at Manchester University.

== Career ==
Spencer-Longhurst made her television debut in 2005 in the BBC television series Dalziel and Pascoe. Her professional stage debut was in 2007 at the Young Vic Theatre in a critically acclaimed production of The Member of the Wedding where she played the part of Frankie Addams. She played Rosalie in the Lillian Helman play The Children's Hour at The Royal Exchange Theatre, Cecily in a musical adaptation of Oscar Wilde's The Importance of Being Earnest, and had also performed the role of Belle in a stage version of A Christmas Carol at the King's Head Theatre. In addition, she had roles as Reza in the West End production of the musical Once and Lavinia in Titus Andronicus at Shakespeare's Globe.

In 2011, she played the dual role of Lisa and Tomaso in the CBBC series Leonardo where she played the part of a girl disguised as an apprentice male artist. Other roles in television included Losing It with Martin Clunes, and the 2006 pilot episode of Lewis. Her motion picture debut Walking with the Enemy had won her a Best Supporting Actress award at the Fort Lauderdale International Film Festival and was released in April 2014. She has also appeared in Wallander, Unforgiven, "Father Brown", and Walking with the Enemy.

== Acting credits ==
=== Film and television ===
- Dalziel and Pascoe (TV series) "Dust Thou Art" (2005) – Lisa Johnstone
- Lewis (2006 TV film, pilot episode) – Jessica Pollock
- Losing It (2006 TV film) – Erica MacNaughton
- The Family Man (2006 TV film) – Chloe
- The Afternoon Play (TV series) "The Real Deal" (2007) – Laura Fisher
- Wallander (TV series) "One Step Behind" (2008) – Isa
- Unforgiven (2009 TV series) – Emily Belcombe
- Comedy Showcase (TV series) "Chickens" (2011) – Gracie
- Taken (2011 short film) – Jill Maine
- Leonardo (2011–12 TV series) – Lisa/Tomaso/Tom
- Father Brown (TV series) "The Face of Death" (2013) – Lucia Galloway
- Beautiful Relics (2013 short film)
- Walking with the Enemy (2014) – Rachel Schoen
- The Bastard Executioner (TV series) (2015) – Baroness Lowry "Love" Aberffraw Ventris
- Oasis (TV Series) (2017) - Bea
- Midsomer Murders (TV Series) "The Curse of the Ninth" (2017) - Natalie Wheeler
- The Irish Connection (2022) - Alice Baker

=== Theatre ===
- Member of the Wedding (Young Vic Theatre) 2007 – Frankie Addams
- Ghosts (Young Vic Theatre) 2008 – Regina Engstrand
- Girl With a Pearl Earring (Theatre Royal Haymarket) 2008 – Cornelia Vermeer
- The Children's Hour (Royal Exchange Theatre) 2008 – Rosalie Wells
- A Christmas Carol (King's Head Theatre) 2009 – Belle
- The Beggar's Opera (Open Air Theatre) 2011 – Polly Peacham
- The Importance of Being Earnest (Theatre Royal, Windsor) 2011 – Cecily Cardew
- Once (Phoenix Theatre) 2013 – Reza
- Titus Andronicus (Shakespeare's Globe) 2014 – Lavinia
- Love's Labour's Lost (Royal Shakespeare Theatre) 2014 – Katharine
- Love's Labour's Won (also known as Much Ado About Nothing) (Royal Shakespeare Theatre) 2014 – Hero
- A Christmas Truce (Royal Shakespeare Theatre) 2014 – Mrs. Godrey
- The Real Thing (2017) for director Stephen Unwin, playing Annie — Theatre Royal, Bath.
