= Colin Ryan (actor) =

English actor

- Born: 23 June 1986 (age 40); Birmingham, England
- Occupation: Actor
- Years active: 2010–present
- Known for: Leonardo, Final Fantasy XIV

Colin Santisuk Green (born 23 June 1986), known professionally as Colin Ryan, is a Thai English actor. He is known for his roles as Lorenzo de Medici in the BBC series Leonardo, Harry in the Doctor Who series 10 episode "Knock Knock", Apollo in Hades II, and as the voice of Alphinaud Leveilleur in Final Fantasy XIV from the Heavensward expansion onward.

== Early life and education ==
Ryan was born in Birmingham, England, on 23 June 1986. His father is from Birmingham and his mother is Thai and Chinese.

Ryan trained at Arts Educational Schools, London, and graduated in 2009. His first job after graduation was with Rufus Hound in sci-fi comedy Hounded for CBBC. He also did the pilot for BBC Switch comedy Shelfstackers.

== Career ==
Stage roles at drama school include Caiaphas the Elder and Simon the Zealot in The Last Days of Judas Iscariot, Weinberl in On the Razzle and Ariel in The Tempest.

Other stage credits include the Ghost of Christmas Past at Birmingham REP and I Was Looking at the Ceiling and Then I Saw the Sky, a contemporary opera at Theatre Royal Stratford East. The story takes place in the aftermath of the 1994 earthquake in Los Angeles, and covers the reactions of all characters to the event. The main characters are seven young Americans all living in Los Angeles but from different social and ethnic backgrounds.

In 2011, he was cast as Lorenzo de' Medici in the program Leonardo. The first series of Leonardo was shot on location in South Africa throughout the second half of 2010. A second series was completed on location in Cape Town and aired in 2012.

He has voiced Alphinaud Leveilleur in Final Fantasy XIV since 2015. In 2025, he voiced Apollo in the game Hades II.

== Personal life ==
In 2024 during a Twitch livestream, Ryan revealed that he is diagnosed with autism, and stated that he suffers from overstimulation on a regular basis.

== Work ==
=== Television ===
Year	Title	Role	Notes
2010	Shelfstackers	Dan	Pilot
2010	Hounded	Barry/Buck	13 episodes
2011-2012	Leonardo	Lorenzo de' Medici	26 episodes (main character)
2017	Doctor Who	Harry	Episode: "Knock Knock"
2019	Shakespeare & Hathaway: Private Investigators	Benoit Roux	Episode: "Outrageous Fortune"
2021	Death in Paradise	Jamie Santisuk	Episode: Series 10, Episode 7
2021	Boundless	Enrique of Malacca	4 episodes
2023	Lot No. 249	Monkhouse Lee	One-off Christmas special
2025	Wolf King	Vincent	Voice
2026	Casualty	Aaron Lang	Episode: "Lethal Legacy, Episode 7"

=== Video games ===
Year	Title	Role	Notes
2011	The Last Story	Yurick	Voice
2015	Final Fantasy XIV: Heavensward	Alphinaud	Voice
2017	Final Fantasy XIV: Stormblood	Alphinaud	Voice
2019	Final Fantasy XIV: Shadowbringers	Alphinaud	Voice
2021	Final Fantasy XIV: Endwalker	Alphinaud	Voice
2024	Hades II	Apollo	Voice
2024	Final Fantasy XIV: Dawntrail	Alphinaud	Voice
2026	The Blood of Dawnwalker	Marat, various characters	Voice

=== Theatre ===
Year	Title	Role	Notes
2010	I Was Looking at the Ceiling and Then I Saw the Sky	Rick	Theatre Royal Stratford East
2012	Deadkidsongs	Peter	Theatre Royal, Bath
2013	A Midsummer Night's Dream	Puck	Royal & Derngate
2013	The Lightning Child	Soldier	Shakespeare's Globe
2013	Macbeth	Donalbain/Fleance/Young Macduff	Shakespeare's Globe
2014	Wendy & Peter Pan	Tom	Royal Shakespeare Company
2015	Love's Sacrifice	Giacapo	Royal Shakespeare Company
2015	The Jew of Malta	Don Mathias	Royal Shakespeare Company
2015	Volpone	Peregrine	Royal Shakespeare Company
2017	Snow in Midsummer	Handsome Zhang	Royal Shakespeare Company
2017	The Secret Theatre	Thomas Phelippes	Sam Wanamaker Playhouse
2019	Edward II	Spencer Junior	Sam Wanamaker Playhouse
2020	My Brilliant Friend	Alfonso	National Theatre
2024	Little Shop of Horrors	Seymour	Crucible Theatre
2026	Death Note: the Musical	L	Barbican Center
2026	Martin Guerre	Benoit	Old Vic
