= The Bastard Executioner =

American television series

- Genre: Historical fiction
- Created by: Kurt Sutter
- Starring: Lee Jones; Katey Sagal; Flora Spencer-Longhurst; Sam Spruell; Sarah Sweeney; Danny Sapani; Darren Evans; Kurt Sutter; Timothy V. Murphy; Sarah White; Elen Rhys; Ethan Griffiths; Stephen Moyer; Ross O'Hennessy
- Theme music composer: Kurt Sutter; Bob Thiele Jr.
- Composer: Bob Thiele Jr.
- Country of origin: United States
- Original language: English
- No. of seasons: 1
- No. of episodes: 10

Production
- Executive producers: Brian Grazer; Francie Calfo; Paris Barclay; Kurt Sutter
- Producer: Chris Thompson
- Cinematography: Mike Spragg; Henry Braham; Denis Crossan; Sam McCurdy
- Editors: Paul Fontaine; Rick Tuber; Tamara Luciano
- Running time: 46–63 minutes
- Production companies: Sutter Ink; Imagine Television; FX Productions; Fox 21 Television Studios

Original release
- Network: FX
- Release: September 15 – November 17, 2015

The Bastard Executioner is an American historical fiction drama television series, created by Kurt Sutter, that aired on FX from September 15, 2015, to November 17, 2015. On November 18, 2015, Sutter cancelled the show after one season, as a cancellation by FX was imminent.

== Overview ==
Set in early 14th century Wales, Wilkin Brattle, a Welsh knight in the army of King Edward I of England, is betrayed by an Englishman with a lust for power who leaves him for dead. When Brattle is near death, a child apparition implores him to lay down his sword and follow the path of a different man.

Later in life, Brattle lives as a happily married peasant farmer in Wales, awaiting the birth of his child. His new life of peace is shattered by the unbearable taxes assessed on the peasants by "Baron" Erik Ventris, the man who had betrayed Brattle. Pressured by his fellow villagers, Brattle leads a raid on the Baron's tax collector, which provokes Ventris' revenge killing of all the women and children in Brattle's village, and the burning of that village.

Brattle's raiders battle with the Baron, ending in Ventris' death and the massacre of his troops. Revenge, however, is not complete, as the raiders want all the soldiers who slaughtered their kin to die by the sword.

Brattle assumes the identity of Gawain Maddox, a journeyman punisher (executioner) injected into the plot just moments before the Baron's death. Brattle, aka Maddox, enters Castle Ventris intending to identify the remaining murderers so his fellow raiders can exact revenge. However, castle intrigue traps Brattle in his new alias and disdainful profession, forcing him to lead a double life while trying to determine whether this new path is the one the apparition has chosen for him, or if he has been led astray.

The plot partially involves the fallout from the real-life Welsh revolt of 1294–95 against English rule, led by Madog ap Llywelyn.

== Cast ==
=== Main cast ===
- Lee Jones as Wilkin Brattle / Gawain Maddox the Executioner
- Stephen Moyer as Chamberlain Milus Corbett
- Flora Spencer-Longhurst as Baroness Lowry "Love" Aberffraw Ventris
- Kurt Sutter as Ludwig Von Zettel, better known as The Dark Mute/The scarred Templar
- Sam Spruell as Toran Prichard / Marshal the Soldier
- Katey Sagal as Annora of the Alders
- Darren Evans as Ash y Goedwig
- Danny Sapani as Berber the Moor
- Timothy V. Murphy as Father Ruskin, the manor priest
- Sarah White as Isabel Kiffin, the Baroness' Lady In Waiting and childhood friend
- Sarah Sweeny as Jessamy Maddox, Gawain Maddox's widow
- Ethan Griffiths as Luca Maddox, Gawain and Jessamy Maddox's son
- Elen Rhys as Petra Brattle, Wilkin Brattle's wife

=== Special guest stars ===
- Brían F. O'Byrne as Baron Erik Ventris, lord of the fictional Barony of Ventrishire
- Matthew Rhys as Gruffudd y Blaidd, known as "The Wolf"; the leader of a growing rebellion against corruption, an ally to Wilkin and his friends, and the Baroness' half-brother

=== Recurring/guest stars ===
- Kyle Rees as Calo Caine
- Richard Brake as Baron Edwin Pryce
- Ed Sheeran as Sir Cormac
- Alec Newman as Leon Tell
- Francis Magee as Absolon
- Scroobius Pip as Aiden
- Tom Forbes as Piers Gaveston, 1st Earl of Cornwall
- Trevor Sellers as Robinus, the Archdeacon of Windsor and commander of the Rosula soldiers
- Ross O'Hennessy as Locke
- James Rousseau as Denley
- Tim McDonnell as Huxley
- Llew Davies as Norton
- Eloise Lovell Anderson as Clara
- Sophie Lovell Anderson as Ramona
- Matthieu Charneau as Frenchie

== Episodes ==
No.	Title	Directed by	Written by	Original release date	Prod. code	US viewers (millions)
1	"Pilot"	Paris Barclay	Kurt Sutter	September 15, 2015	1WAY01	2.11
2	"Pilot"	Paris Barclay	Kurt Sutter	September 15, 2015	1WAY02	2.11
3	"Effigy / Ddelw"	Paris Barclay	Kurt Sutter & Charles Murray & Nichole Beattie	September 22, 2015	1WAY03	1.09
4	"A Hunger / Newyn"	Ciaran Donnelly	Curtis Gwinn	September 29, 2015	1WAY04	1.26
5	"Piss Profit / Proffidwyr Troeth"	Kari Skogland	Roberto Patino	October 6, 2015	1WAY05	1.12
6	"Thorns / Drain"	Billy Gierhart	John Barcheski & Kurt Sutter	October 13, 2015	1WAY06	0.94
7	"Behold the Lamb / Gweled yr Oen"	Ashley Way	Carly Wray & Kurt Sutter	October 20, 2015	1WAY07	0.83
8	"Broken Things / Pethau Toredig"	Ciaran Donnelly	Ryan Scott & Kurt Sutter	November 3, 2015	1WAY08	1.08
9	"The Bernadette Maneuver / Cynllwyn Bernadette"	Paris Barclay	Robert Patino & Curtis Gwinn & Kurt Sutter	November 10, 2015	1WAY09	0.82
10	"Blood and Quiescence / Crau a Chwsg"	Ashley Way	Kurt Sutter	November 17, 2015	1WAY10	0.87

== Production ==
The Bastard Executioner, the first pilot for Imagine TV with FX Network, stemmed from an idea by Grazer: "I find the executioner to be an incredibly fascinating and provocative character", he said. "He deals with the highest order and the lowest order in the culture. It's about as morally complex a profession as you can imagine". Grazer pitched the idea to 20th Television chairmen Dana Walden and Gary Newman. The two, along with Fox21 president Bert Salke, suggested Sutter as writer. After meeting with Grazer and taking some time to contemplate the idea, Sutter built a whole world around it, and the pitch was taken to FX.

Sutter explained the writing process and obstacles for the show on his vlog: "It's sort of fun of jumping into completely different world, completely different time, completely different vernacular, it's a toughest thing for me right now with the pilot is the story is all broken on my board here but you know trying to find different rhythms of speech and vernacular". Sutter held his fans hostage who were eagerly waiting for his new project. "I'm not writing it on period speech just because there's no actual recording of what that vernacular sounded like with intonation and everything."

The series was announced in December 2013. Sutter began writing the scripts once the last episode of Sons of Anarchy had wrapped up in late 2014. He reported Katey Sagal is "definitely...involved" in the series.

Paris Barclay, who directed 15 episodes of Sons of Anarchy, directed The Bastard Executioner pilot and was executive producer. Charles Murray, a writer/co-executive producer of the last two seasons of Sons of Anarchy, was a writer/co-executive producer on The Bastard Executioner series. Nichole Beattie was another Sons of Anarchy alumna on The Bastard Executioner writing staff; she has also written extensively for AMC's The Walking Dead and Rubicon.

The Bastard Executioner was filmed in Wales, United Kingdom, and featured a mostly British cast.

Barclay left for the UK on January 2 to work on casting and location matters. Sutter stayed in the US to finalize the script. He joined Barclay a few days later in the United Kingdom. The draft of the pilot script was sent to the studio executives at FX on 7 January. During mid-January, Sutter and Barclay visited several possible shooting locations in Wales, including Caerphilly Castle and Fforest Fawr.

Filming began on 23, 2015. The show's producers spent 10 months considering locations in Wales with the help of the Welsh Government's Wales Screen service, which encourages film and television productions to use locations, crews, and facilities throughout Wales. The project was one of the first major productions to move into Pinewood Studios' new facility in Cardiff.

The set for the series, in the form of a medieval village with a small castle, was constructed to the west of Cardiff at Dragon International Film Studios in Llanilid.

On May 22, 2015,The Bastard Executioner was picked up for a 10-episode series for fall launch.

On November 18, 2015, Sutter announced that FX was planning on canceling the series so Sutter decided to voluntarily pull the plug even though he had not actually received an official notice of cancelation. He could have filmed more episodes, but since the show's fate was already decided, he saw that as a waste of time and money.

== Reception ==
Reviews for The Bastard Executioner were polarized, with praise being directed toward the action sequences and acting, and criticism toward the writing, pacing, limited character development, and excessive violence. It holds a rating of 49% on the review aggregator website Rotten Tomatoes, based on 53 critics; the website's consensus reads: "Kurt Sutter's The Bastard Executioner doesn't want for dark thrills, but it unfortunately has more enthusiasm for brutality and gore than necessary narrative focus." Out of 37 reviews in Metacritic, the show holds a rating of 55.
