= Girl with a Pearl Earring (play) =

2008 play by David Joss Buckley

Girl with a Pearl Earring is a 2008 play. Adapted by David Joss Buckley from the 1999 novel of the same title by Tracy Chevalier, it premiered at the Cambridge Arts Theatre. It then received its London premiere at the Theatre Royal Haymarket on 29 September 2008, directed by Joe Dowling and designed by Peter Mumford. Its London run had been scheduled to end on 1 November, but after largely poor reviews and in a poor financial climate it closed early on 18 October.

== London cast ==
- Niall Buggy - Van Ruijven
- Adrian Dunbar - Johannes Vermeer
- Jonathan Bailey - Pieter
- Kimberley Nixon - Griet
- Sara Kestelman - Maria Thins
- Flora Spencer-Longhurst - Cornelia Vermeer

== See also ==
- Girl with a Pearl Earring, c. 1665 Vermeer painting
