= Jonathan Bailey =

English actor (born 1988)

- Bailey in 2026
- Born: Jonathan Stuart Bailey; 25 April 1988 (age 38); Oxfordshire, England
- Occupation: Actor
- Years active: 1995–present
- Works: Full list
- Awards: Full list

Jonathan Stuart Bailey (born 25 April 1988) is an English actor known for his dramatic, comedic, and musical roles on stage and screen. His accolades include a Laurence Olivier Award and a Critics' Choice Television Award as well as a nomination for a Primetime Emmy Award and four Actor Awards. He was included by Time magazine in their Time 100 Next list of the world's most influential artists and was named as People's Sexiest Man Alive in 2025.

Bailey began his career as a child actor in Royal Shakespeare Company productions and by eight was performing as Gavroche in a West End production of Les Misérables. He starred in contemporary plays such as The York Realist in 2018 and Cock in 2022; in classical plays like Othello in 2013 and Richard II in 2025; as well as in musicals, namely the London revival of The Last Five Years in 2016 and the West End gender-swapped revival of Company for which he won the Laurence Olivier Award for Best Actor in a Supporting Role in a Musical in 2019.

On screen, Bailey starred in the action-adventure series Leonardo (2011–2012) and the musical-comedy Groove High (2012–2013) before becoming known for the crime drama Broadchurch (2013–2015) and the comedy Crashing (2016). He gained wider recognition for his roles in the Regency romance series Bridgerton (2020–present) and the political miniseries Fellow Travelers (2023) which earned him a Critics' Choice Television Award as well as a nomination for a Primetime Emmy Award for Best Supporting Actor. For his role as Fiyero Tigelaar / The Scarecrow in the musical fantasy film Wicked (2024), he was nominated for an Actor Award for Outstanding Performance by a Male Actor in a Supporting Role; he reprised his role in the sequel Wicked: For Good (2025). Bailey also starred in the science fiction thriller film Jurassic World Rebirth (2025).

Outside acting, Bailey is involved in philanthropic activities with particular focus on the queer community. In 2024, he founded the LGBTQ+ charity The Shameless Fund.

== Early life ==
Jonathan Stuart Bailey was born on 25 April 1988, in Wallingford, Oxfordshire, the son of Carole, an audiologist, and Stuart Bailey, who was the managing director of Rowse Honey. He grew up in nearby Benson and Brightwell-cum-Sotwell, and has three older sisters. He described his upbringing as a "co-operative of four brilliant women and a dad who has an incredible work ethic". He decided that he wanted to be an actor at the age of five after his grandmother took him to see a production of Oliver! in London. His first ever appearance on stage was in a primary school production of Noah's Ark, playing a raindrop.

Bailey attended the local Church of England–affiliated Benson Primary School, then The Oratory School while taking ballet lessons. He later had a music scholarship to Magdalen College School, Oxford where he played the piano and clarinet. After securing a talent agent at fifteen years old and booking acting roles, he eventually declined his university acceptance offer and opted not to go to drama school, later saying that this kept him grounded in the performing arts: "I've never gone in as the overdog, and that's liberating and I don't want that to ever change. I just want to allow my own experiences to come through."

== Career ==
=== Beginnings as a child actor (1995–2010) ===
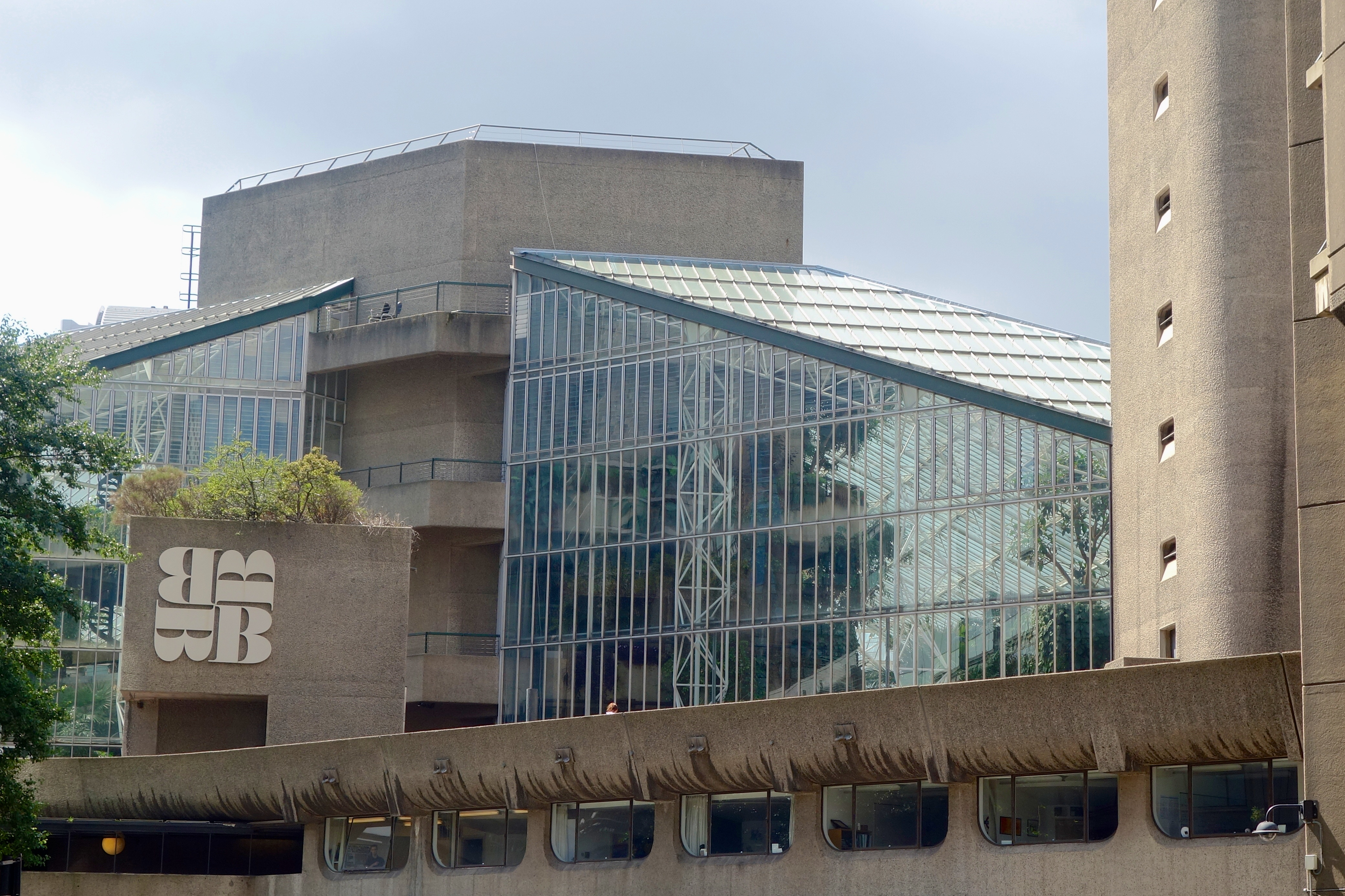
The Barbican Theatre where Bailey made his professional acting debut at the age of seven for the Royal Shakespeare Company

Through his dance club in Henley-on-Thames, Bailey auditioned for and landed the alternating roles of Tiny Tim and Young Scrooge in the 1995 Royal Shakespeare Company (RSC) production of A Christmas Carol at the Barbican Theatre in London at seven years old. He sang "Where Is Love?" from Oliver! for his audition. The following year, he made his television debut in the Victorian period drama Bramwell. Bailey also played Little Baptiste in the RSC's 1996 production of Les Enfants du Paradis. By eight years old, he was performing as Gavroche in a West End production of Les Misérables. He has also done pantomime in a production of Peter Pan at The Hexagon playing Michael Darling.

In 2001, Bailey played Prince Arthur for the RSC's King John. He made his feature film debut in 2004 in Five Children and It, a film adaptation of E. Nesbit's fantasy novel of the same name. In 2006, on the last day of his A levels, he started rehearsing for a revival of the play Beautiful Thing in London, taking over the lead role from Andrew Garfield. The Telegraph wrote that Bailey "memorably lit up" the production. That role was followed by guest roles in long-running British television staples like Doctors and The Bill. His first leading role on television was in the 2009 BBC sitcom Off the Hook about a group of first-year university students.

=== Television breakthrough and success on stage (2011–2019) ===
In 2011, Bailey played the titular Leonardo da Vinci in the 2011 CBBC action-adventure series Leonardo, which follows a young Leonardo and his friends in 15th century Florence. The show ran for two series, spawned an online game, and received four KidScreen Awards. The same year, he starred in the comedy Campus, a semi-improvised sitcom in which he played Flatpack, a student athlete with Olympic potential.

Bailey was nominated for Outstanding Newcomer at the Evening Standard Theatre Awards for his performance in David Hare's play South Downs at Minerva Theatre in 2011, and its later transfer to Harold Pinter Theatre the following year. The Telegraph described him as a future star and one of "the brightest up-and-coming actors currently starring on the West End stage." He also led the Disney Channel musical-comedy Groove High playing the popstar Tom that ran from 2012 to 2013 for 26 episodes and was a mixture of live action and animation where Bailey sang and also did the voiceover of his character's animated form.

In 2013, Bailey rose to popularity for playing the local journalist Olly Stevens in the first two series of the hit crime-drama Broadchurch on ITV. On stage, he was cast by then Royal National Theatre's artistic director Nicholas Hytner as Cassio in his production of William Shakespeare's Othello at the Olivier Theatre in 2013. Bailey considers this his "big break" with Hytner also becoming his mentor. The production was shown to cinemas via National Theatre Live. His "likable, open-faced", and "smoothly ambitious" Cassio was "splendid", per The Washington Post. Hytner also directed Bailey in one of the vignettes for National Theatre Live: 50 Years On Stage where he played Valentine Coverly from Tom Stoppard's Arcadia.

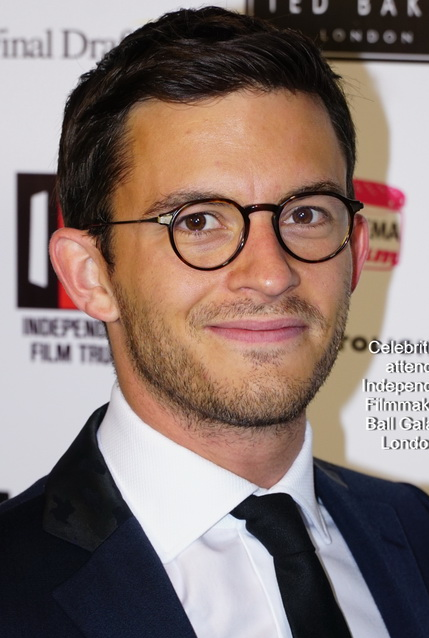
Bailey in 2015

Bailey originated the role of Tim Price in Duncan Sheik's musical American Psycho directed by Rupert Goold at the Almeida Theatre. He then guest starred in the Doctor Who episode "Time Heist" in 2014. The episode was described by The Independent as "a fast-paced caper" with Bailey stealing the show with his compelling performance as augmented human Psi. He also had a supporting role in the period film Testament of Youth (2014). Bailey returned to comedy in BBC's satirical show W1A as Jack, a role he would play for three series.

In 2016, Bailey starred as Sam, a sex-obsessed estate agent in Phoebe Waller-Bridge's first television project Crashing that W magazine described as a "twisted version of Friends". The same year, he headlined the London production of the musical The Last Five Years as Jamie with music, lyrics, and direction by Jason Robert Brown at St. James Theatre. The Stage's Mark Shenton called the production "poignant" turning "each song into a masterclass of storytelling" with Bailey "a real vocal surprise with his haunting renditions of 'If I Didn't Believe in You' and 'Nobody Needs to Know'." Edward Seckerson of The Arts Desk wrote, in his five-star review, that Bailey was "sensationally good" and delivered tour-de-force musical performances of "Moving Too Fast" and "The Schmuel Song".

Bailey appeared alongside Ian McKellen in the acclaimed production of King Lear at Chichester Festival Theatre in 2017. He received rave reviews for his performance as Edgar which the Evening Standard described as "a touching study of transformation". Bailey also made a guest appearance in series two episode two of Michaela Coel's sitcom Chewing Gum in 2017 where he played Ash, a romantic interest to Coel's character Tracey. With 2017's release of the video game expansion Final Fantasy XIV: Stormblood, Bailey would begin voicing the character G'raha Tia, a role that he has continued since in further Final Fantasy XIV expansions Shadowbringers (2019), Endwalker (2021) and Dawntrail (2024). Bailey has cited enjoyment of the role and praised the writing as almost Shakespearian.

From February to April 2018, Bailey starred in Donmar Warehouse-Sheffield Theatres co-production of Peter Gill's The York Realist. The Evening Standard, The Arts Desk, and Sunday Express gave the production five stars, with The Independent calling it "a pitch-perfect, impeccably acted production" in its own five-star review. Bailey joined the 2018 West End production of Stephen Sondheim's Company directed by Marianne Elliott. He originated the gender-swapped role of Jamie which was initially written as a female character named Amy. Per The Times, Bailey "received an ovation every night after completing the infamous 'Getting Married Today' a rat-tat-tat, mile-a-minute technical feat, lyrically, about marriage jitters." His "lightning-fast, show-stopping rendition of the song became a must-see West End event" according to Variety, and won him the 2019 Laurence Olivier Award for Best Actor in a Supporting Role in a Musical.

=== International recognition and work on film (2020–present) ===
Since 2020, Bailey has starred in the Shondaland-produced Netflix series Bridgerton, an adaptation of Julia Quinn's Regency romance novels, as Anthony, 9th Viscount Bridgerton. His portrayal was critically acclaimed, and gained him wide recognition. The second series, which centered around his character, became the most watched English-language television series on Netflix at the time. The Daily Beast elaborating on Bailey's "exquisite lead performance", wrote that "he has an exceptional ability to carry his angst, pain, and guilt with him without bogging down things into a somber drag."

Bailey headlined the acclaimed 2022 West End revival of Mike Bartlett's play Cock at the Ambassadors Theatre, reuniting him with his Company director Elliot. The Observer called it an "immaculate production", with The Arts Desk writing that it was "brutal, bruising, and brilliant". In the lead role, Bailey's "terrific performance" was "utterly captivating", with Variety noting that his "whiplash comic timing lifts his character from self-obsessed to scintillating, a quality he uses both artfully and artlessly."

In 2023, Bailey starred opposite Matt Bomer in the Showtime adaptation of Fellow Travelers. His performance was described by The Washington Post as "sensational" and won him a Critics' Choice Award for Best Supporting Actor in a Miniseries and earned him a nomination for a Primetime Emmy Award for Outstanding Supporting Actor in a Limited or Anthology Series or Movie. The following year, he had a guest appearance in the third series of the teen drama Heartstopper.

Bailey played Fiyero in the musical fantasy films Wicked (2024), based on the musical of the same name. He was deemed a standout by critics with The Guardian writing that he "uncorks an outrageous scene-stealer as the hetero-camp Fiyero", and ABC News noting that his performance was a "display of song, dance and acting virtuosity". He contributed to the film's soundtrack with the song "Dancing Through Life", which debuted at number 90 on Billboard Hot 100, peaking at number eighty-six. His performance earned him a nomination for an Actor Award for Outstanding Performance by a Male Actor in a Supporting Role, alongside another nomination for the film's cast for Outstanding Performance by a Cast in a Motion Picture.

Bailey played the titular role of Richard II at the Bridge Theatre in Nicholas Hytner's production of Shakespeare's play of the same name until May 2025. His performance received positive reviews from critics and he was nominated for Best Actor at the Evening Standard Theatre Awards. The same year, Bailey starred in the science fiction film Jurassic World Rebirth directed by Gareth Edwards and reprised his role as Fiyero in the musical fantasy film Wicked: For Good. The box office successes of the two films made him the highest grossing actor of 2025. Bailey was expected to star in Marianne Elliott's Barbican Theatre production of Sunday in the Park with George in the summer of 2027 but withdrew from the production.

== Public image ==
Bailey has been described by the media as a sex symbol whose fans, according to the Los Angeles Times, span "all genders and orientations". Time magazine included Bailey in its annual class of Next Generation Leaders in 2022, writing that he is "redefining the 'Hollywood Heartthrob'". In 2025, he was included in Time magazine's Time 100 Next list of the world's most influential rising stars. Also in 2025, he was named as People's Sexiest Man Alive – the first openly gay man to receive the title.

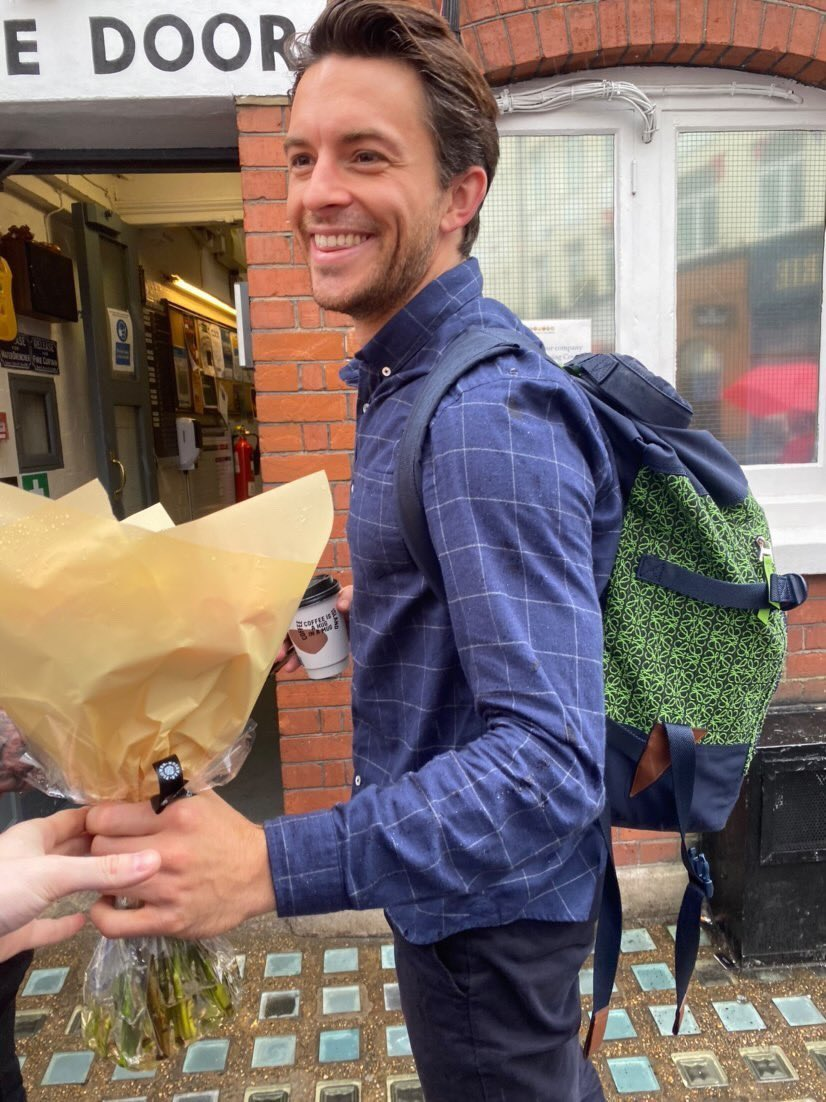
Bailey in 2022

Critic Peter Travers described Bailey as "a dynamite actor equally adept at drama and musicals." Describing Bailey's off-screen persona, The Cut's Kerensa Cadenas noted that talking to him is "a lesson in charm – he's personable, super-handsome, and utterly hilarious." Douglas Greenwood of GQ wrote that "dispositionally, he's one of those actors who'd rather work than be famous".

Phoebe Waller-Bridge described her former co-star as "completely brilliant... unbelievably charismatic in real life and so energetic", "Jonny operates at a different voltage. He's a meteorite of fun with an incredible amount of energy and playfulness." Director Marianne Elliott expressed that Bailey is "the nicest person you could ever hope to meet. But when he acts, he can have an edge, which can feel dangerous in a great way. An unpredictability." Elliott recalled that Stephen Sondheim was enamoured with Bailey. Three days before the composer died in 2021, Elliott told him that Bailey would be starring in the play Cock. Sondheim "literally stopped in his tracks, closed his eyes, put his hand on his chest and said, 'Be still my beating heart,'" Elliott recounted.

Bailey is considered one of the leading LGBTQ+ figures in the entertainment industry and has been included in several influential lists including Attitude's Trailblazers in 2020, Variety's Power of Pride list in 2022, Out's Most Impactful and Influential in 2023, and The Independent's Pride List in 2024. GQ described him as "one of the few gay British actors working onscreen whose roles don't seem defined wholly by their sexuality." Pride declared that he is proof gay actors can convincingly play straight roles, with Out writing that Bailey's visibility is inspiring LGBTQ+ performers to come out.

== Philanthropy ==
In 2019, Bailey participated in the National Three Peaks Challenge to raise money for the Scottish branch of the Motor Neurone Disease Association. In 2024, he ran the Hackney Half Marathon to benefit LGBTQ+ youth charity Just Like Us of which he is a patron.

=== The Shameless Fund ===
In 2024, Bailey founded the charity The Shameless Fund that "aims to help members of the queer community across the world live freely and authentically" by raising money through celebrity and brand partnerships. The charity's debut collaboration was with fashion brand Loewe's "Drink Your Milk" collection. In 2025, Bailey collaborated with eyewear brand Cubitts to re-imagine the glasses worn by his character in Jurassic World Rebirth with proceeds benefiting the charity.

== Personal life ==
Bailey resides in Hove, East Sussex. An avid cyclist, Bailey has competed in marathons and triathlons in addition to doing paddleboarding and mountaineering. In 2018, he hiked the Everest Base Camp in Nepal.

Bailey privately came out as gay to friends and family in his early 20s, but did not comment on it in public for another decade. He came out publicly in 2018. Although cautious of discussing his sexuality, which he sees as a personal matter that "becomes a commodity and a currency", he is committed to visibility and representation, saying: "If I can fill spaces that I didn't have growing up, then I feel like that's a really brilliant thing." He also called this "something [I'll] always strive to do".
