= National Theatre Live: 50 Years On Stage =

2013 documentary directed by Nicholas Hytner

- Directed by: Nicholas Hytner
- Produced by
- Starring: Michael Gambon; Maggie Smith; Judi Dench; Helen Mirren; Ralph Fiennes; Benedict Cumberbatch; Derek Jacobi; Penelope Wilton; Simon Russell Beale; Andrew Scott; Frances de la Tour
- Distributed by: PBS / BBC 2
- Release date: November 2, 2013
- Running time: 2 hours 31 minutes
- Country: United Kingdom

National Theatre Live: 50 Years On Stage is a 2013 live staged event film directed by Nicholas Hytner. Shown in theatres and on PBS and National Theatre Live. The program is presented by The Royal National Theatre which celebrates 50 years of theatre, with some extracts of the best productions from the last five decades including Alan Bennett, Noël Coward, David Hare, Tony Kushner, Eugene O'Neill, Harold Pinter, William Shakespeare, George Bernard Shaw, Tom Stoppard, and Tennessee Williams performed by the countries best performers including Judi Dench, Maggie Smith, Michael Gambon, Helen Mirren, Benedict Cumberbatch, Andrew Scott, Penelope Wilton, Simon Russell Beale, Frances de la Tour, Ian Holm, Derek Jacobi, and Joan Plowright.

== Summary ==
=== Live performances ===
The program features a variety of live performances from productions by the Royal National Theatre from the past five decades:

- Hamlet by William Shakespeare featuring Matthew Barker, Stanley Townsend, Anna Maxwell Martin, Adrian Lester, and Derek Jacobi.
- Saint Joan by George Bernard Shaw featuring Joan Plowright
- Rosencrantz and Guildenstern are Dead by Tom Stoppard featuring Benedict Cumberbatch and Kobna Holdbrook-Smith
- A clip from the 1964 production of Hay Fever by Noël Coward starring Maggie Smith and Anthony Nichols introduces:
  - The Beaux Stratagem by George Farquhar featuring Maggie Smith
- No Man's Land by Harold Pinter featuring Michael Gambon and Derek Jacobi
- Bedroom Farce by Alan Ayckbourn featuring Penelope Wilton and Nicholas Le Prevost
- Guys and Dolls by Frank Loesser, Jo Swerling, and Abe Burrows, featuring Clive Rowe, Sharon D. Clarke and company
- A clip from 1985 production of Pravda featuring Anthony Hopkins introduces:
  - Pravda by David Hare featuring Ralph Fiennes and Boyd Gaines
- Anthony and Cleopatra by William Shakespeare featuring Judi Dench and Rory Kinnear
- Angels in America by Tony Kushner featuring Dominic Cooper and Andrew Scott
- The Absence of War by David Hare featuring Christopher Eccleston and company
- Arcadia by Tom Stoppard featuring Rory Kinnear, Jonathan Bailey, and company
- A Little Night Music by Stephen Sondheim featuring Judi Dench who sings "Send In the Clowns".
- Copenhagen by Michael Frayn featuring Roger Allam
- My Fair Lady by Alan Jay Lerner and Frederick Loewe, featuring Alex Jennings and company
- Stuff Happens by David Hare featuring Alex Jennings and Lloyd Owen
- The History Boys by Alan Bennet featuring Bennett, Cooper, James Corden and company
- War Horse based on the children's novel featuring company
- One Man, Two Guvnors featuring James Corden
- Othello by William Shakespeare featuring Adrian Lester and Rory Kinnear
- The Habit of Art by Alan Bennett featuring Frances de la Tour

The final curtain call includes all the actors from each decade of the National Theatre's working history.

=== Featured clips ===
Clips from original staged productions include:

- Amadeus (1979) by Peter Shafer featuring Paul Scofield
- Richard III (1990) by William Shakespeare featuring Ian McKellen
- The Madness of King George (1991) by Alan Bennett featuring Nigel Hawthorne
- Richard II (1995) by William Shakespeare featuring Fiona Shaw
- King Lear (1997) by William Shakespeare featuring Ian Holm and Michael Bryant
- Cat on a Hot Tin Roof (1988) by Tennessee Williams featuring Lindsay Duncan and Ian Charleston
- Mourning Becomes Electra (2003) by Eugene O'Neill featuring Helen Mirren and Tim Pigott-Smith

== Production ==
The production was a part of the celebration of the 50th anniversary of the Royal National Theatre started by Laurence Olivier. The presentation included live performances, interspersed with documentary footage, and archival footage of live performances of original productions from the National Theatre. The night also featured a short film about Olivier, which included recent footage of Plowright reprising her role of St Joan shot at the Old Vic.

== Release ==
The program was released in theaters for a limited time in the United States and in the United Kingdom. In the United States it was shown on PBS. In the United Kingdom it ran on BBC 2.

== Reception ==
Michael Billington of The Guardian wrote, "We got a brilliant, kaleidoscopic entertainment that evoked the National's past and opened up possibilities for the future...Obviously it was moving to see legendary actors, either through archival footage or live performance, repeating past successes." Dalya Alberge of The Observer wrote, Judi Dench, Maggie Smith, Helen Mirren, Derek Jacobi, Michael Gambon, Simon Russell Beale ... the cast was a dream for any director. But the audience was also filled with titans of British theatre, with a guest list that seated playwrights Tom Stoppard, Peter Shaffer and David Hare alongside directors Richard Eyre and Peter Hall and actresses Prunella Scales and Juliet Stevenson. Also present was Joan Plowright, widow of Laurence Olivier – the National's first director and one of the last century's greatest actors."
