= Off the Hook (TV series) =

- DVD Cover
- Written by: Dean Craig
- Directed by: Vadim Jean; Andy de Emmony
- Starring: Jonathan Bailey; Danny Morgan; James Buckley; Joanna Cassidy; Georgia King
- Country of origin: United Kingdom
- Original language: English
- No. of series: 1
- No. of episodes: 7

Production
- Producers: Nick Hamm; Simon Maxwell
- Running time: 30 minutes
- Production company: Greenroom Entertainment

Original release
- Network: BBC Three; BBC HD
- Release: 10 September – 22 October 2009

Off the Hook is a British comedy television series starring Jonathan Bailey, James Buckley, Joanna Cassidy and Georgia King. It is about a group of freshers at university and was first broadcast on BBC Three and BBC HD between 10 September and 22 October 2009.

== Premise ==
The series centres on Danny Gordon (Jonathan Bailey) as he embarks on his first year at Bankside University. Unbeknown to him his "worst best friend" from school, Shane McKay, has been awarded a place at Bankside via the UCAS clearing system, and proceeds to gatecrash Danny's university life. The pair share their student accommodation with Scarlet Hayes, Fred and Wendy "Weird Bloke".

The first episode introduces the characters and displays Danny's introduction into university life including life modelling, chatting up girls who have boyfriends at home and learning that there is a university degree called Moral Philosophy with Comparative Philology.

== Cast ==
- Jonathan Bailey as Danny Gordon
- Danny Morgan as Shane McKay
- James Buckley as Fred
- Joanna Cassidy as Scarlet Hayes
- Georgina King as Weird Bloke

== Production ==
The series was commissioned as part of the BBC Switch strand which was aimed at teenagers. Its original title was Fresh. It first appeared online in small five-minute episodes in September 2008 before later being developed into a full series by independent peoduction company Green Room Entertainment. It was filmed on location at the University of Westminster's Harrow campus, which is used as the backdrop for the fictional Bankside University.
