= Leonardo (2011 TV series) =

British adventure series

- Genre: Action; Adventure
- Created by: Tom Mason; Dan Danko; Melanie Stokes; Pia Ashberry
- Written by: Pia Ashberry; Brian Lynch; Daniel Peak; Alex Perrin; Brian Jordan; Kirstie Falkous; Dan Danko; Tom Mason
- Directed by: Beryl Richards; Luke Watson; Steve Hughes
- Starring: Jonathan Bailey; Flora Spencer-Longhurst; Akemnji Ndifornyen; Colin Ryan; Alistair McGowan; James Clyde
- Theme music composer: Mark Russell
- Country of origin: United Kingdom
- Original language: English
- No. of seasons: 2
- No. of episodes: 26

Production
- Executive producers: Anne Brogan, Melanie Stokes
- Producer: Bernard Krichefski
- Cinematography: Dirk Nel
- Editors: Sue Wyatt, Philip Hookway
- Production company: Kindle Entertainment

Original release
- Network: CBBC
- Release: 11 April 2011 – 6 December 2012

Leonardo is a British action-adventure television series which aired on CBBC for two series from 11 April 2011 to 6 December 2012. Set in 15th-century Florence, the show follows the adventures of a teenage Leonardo da Vinci played by Jonathan Bailey.

== Premise ==
The story follows teenage Leonardo da Vinci played by Jonathan Bailey and his friends which includes the wealthy son of a powerful aristocrat Lorenzo De Medici (Colin Ryan), a girl disguising herself as a boy so she can become an artist Lisa Gherardini (Flora Spencer-Longhurst), and cunning manipulator Machiavelli (Akemnji Ndifornyen).

Inspired by the inventive genius of the real life Leonardo, the series re-imagines da Vinci as a teenage action hero, who finds himself drawn into the dangerous schemes of the Luminari - a sinister secret society who plot to take over Florence. They have stolen Leonardo's notebook and want to use Leonardo's design to create deadly weapons to kill the Duke and allow their leader Piero de'Medici to take over Florence.

=== Series 1 ===
Leonardo and his friends work to recover his notebook, which was taken by the Luminari, a secret society operating in the catacombs of Florence. Utilizing Leonardo's inventions, Lorenzo's resources, Lisa's local knowledge, and Mac's network of spies, the group attempts to stop Piero and save the city. However, the friends are unaware that the head of the secret society is Lorenzo's father, forcing Lorenzo to choose a side upon discovering the truth.

=== Series 2 ===
After siding with his father and trying to take down the Duke during the series one finale, Lorenzo has lost his friends. Leonardo, Lisa and Mac refuse to forgive his betrayal and Lorenzo refuses to apologise. But when Leonardo and Lisa's mentor and surrogate father-figure Verrocchio is framed for murder Lorenzo tries everything in his power to help, pleading with his father Piero (now played by James Clyde) and even arranging an escape attempt. They manage to free Verrocchio but Lorenzo is forced into an arranged marriage and then kidnapped and it's up to his friends to save him. The friends are convinced Piero is the one behind Verrocchio's framing and Lorenzo's kidnapping but when the Duke is murdered by a Milanese assassin the friends have no choice but to team up with Piero to help protect Florence and avenge the Duke's death. Only, Lorenzo discovers it wasn't Milan who killed the Duke it was his own father. Once again he is faced with an impossible choice, his friends or his father? Whatever he decides he has to decide quick as Piero with the help of Leonardo has created deadly weapons like armoured tanks to wage war against Milan.

== Cast and characters ==
- Leonardo da Vinci played by Jonathan Bailey
  - Leonardo (Leo to his friends) is an artist at Verrocchio's workshop. He's a fantastic painter but his mind is often on whatever new invention he is planning on making.
- Tomaso/Lisa Gherardini played by Flora Spencer-Longhurst
  - Lisa ran away from home when her parents tried to force her into marriage. Her dream in life is to be a painter but as it's illegal for women to paint she is forced to disguise herself as a boy (Tomaso) to study in Verrocchio's workshop. She is the subject of Leonardo's famous Mona Lisa.
- Lorenzo de' Medici played by Colin Ryan
  - Lorenzo is the son of Piero, a rich and powerful aristocrat and part of Florence's prestigious Medici family. He is largely bored by his life of luxury and enjoys sneaking away to go on adventures with his friends or hang out in Verrocchio's workshop. He keeps his friendship with Leonardo and the gang a secret as Medici's aren't allowed to be friends with lower classes. He always wants to please his father whom he greatly admires, which often leads to some internal conflict.
- Niccolò Machiavelli played by Akemnji Ndifornyen
  - "Mac" is the number one person to contact if you have a job that needs done. He always has a scheme on the go and his network of child spies and pickpockets keep him updated on all the goings on in the streets of Florence. The friends sometimes have to get him out of trouble when a scheme goes awry.
- Piero de' Medici played by Alistair McGowan (series 1) and James Clyde (series 2)
  - A wealthy and powerful man, Piero runs one of Florence's banks owning over half of the provience. He's the cousin of the Duke of Florence, who he secretly hopes to usurp. Piero keeps a close eye on everything that goes on in Florence, especially those that concern his son Lorenzo and his friends. Unbeknownst to his family Piero is the leader of the secret society, the Luminari and has stolen Leonardo's notebook to create weapons and murder the Duke.
- Maestro Verrocchio played by James Cuningham
  - Leonardo and Lisa's maestro, Verrocchio is their teacher and their surrogate father-figure in the show. While he has high expectations of his apprentices he is always there for them and always stands up for those under his care. Leonardo and Lisa highly respect Verrocchio and look up to him, particularly as Leonardo's own father is frequently abandoning him and Lisa's father has disowned her.
- The Duke played by Graham Hopkins
  - The Duke of Florence is Piero's cousin and is a kind, diplomatic leader who loves democracy and interacting with his subjects. He admires the people of Florence and is frequently spending time and listening to their concerns. He hates suffering and is thankful to be living in a time of peace, oblivious to Piero and the Luminari plotting his downfall.
- Cosimo played by Thembalethu Ntuli
  - A servant at Verrocchio's workshop Cosimo is a friendly boy who is there to cook for the many apprentices who stay in Verrocchio's workshop.
- Teresa de' Medici played by Camilla Waldman
  - Lorenzo's mother, Teresa is a doting, loving woman who spoils her son and believes he can do no wrong. She takes on a larger role in season 2 when Lorenzo is forced to marry Angelica, Teresa becomes an antagonist to Angelica viewing her as not worthy of the Medici title.
- Placidi played by Bart Fouche
  - Head of Security at the Medici Palace and Piero's right-hand man in series 2. Placidi is loyal to Piero and looks out for his son Lorenzo.
- Angelica Visconti played by Roxane Hayward
  - Angelica is the daughter of the wealthy Visconti family and is forced to be betrothed to Lorenzo's in series 2. While neither Lorenzo or Angelica want the marriage to go ahead neither want to disappoint their parents.
- Rocco de' Medici played by Clayton Boyd
  - The hot-headed long-lost son of the Duke of Florence. He appears in series 2 after the Duke's death to become the new Duke and wage war on Milan, he acts as an antagonistic force to Leonardo and his friends until he understands the truth of what's going on.

== Production ==
Leonardo began as a novel outline by Tom Mason and Dan Danko portraying Leonardo da Vinci as a "teenage Renaissance Batman". Although never actually used in a book, Mason and Danko were able to interest the BBC in their unpublished story idea. It was optioned by the BBC in late 2009 and the pre-production was completed by summer 2010. The first series of Leonardo was shot on location in South Africa throughout the second half of 2010.

A second series premiered on the CBBC on 20 September 2012, starting with episodes one and two being shown back to back as an hour-long instalments called Illusion. The second series was completed on location in Cape Town. For series 2, actor James Clyde replaced Alistair McGowan in the role of Piero de' Medici. Roxane Hayward, Bart Fouche, Katie McGlynn and Pam St. Clement guest-starred in the second series.

== Episodes ==
Series	Episodes	Originally released
1	13	11 April 2011
2	13	20 September 2012

=== Series 1 (2011) ===
No. overall	No. in series	Title	Directed by	Written by	Original release date
1	1	"Anything Is Possible"	Beryl Richards	Tom Mason, Dan Danko, Pia Ashberry	11 April 2011
Leonardo is riding his new invention - the bicycle, which he calls "a velocerotor" when he crashes into a street artist named Tomaso. Tomaso soon gets himself an apprenticeship with Leonardo at Verrocchio's workshop. After Leonardo and his friends discover that Tom has stolen Leonardo's notebook, he claims he was forced to steal it by a sinister secret society called the Luminari. But could Tomaso's story be true? And what other secrets is Tomaso hiding?
2	2	"Da Vinci's Code"	Beryl Richards	Alex Perrin	11 April 2011
Piero is trying to decode Leonardo's notebook and enlists the help of a great mathematician, Professor Pico to help decipher it. Will the professor manage to crack the code? And when the professor manipulates Leonardo into helping him, how much danger is he putting himself in?
3	3	"Wing and a Prayer"	Beryl Richards	Tom Mason, Dan Danko, Pia Ashberry	18 April 2011
Leonardo works on his latest invention - a pair of wings that he believes will allow him to fly. But he ends up being brought down to earth when Mac needs his help to get out of a tricky situation.
4	4	"Something Wicked"	Luke Watson	Brian Jordan	25 February 2011
Leonardo and his friends attempt to save an unhappy bride from her villainous fiancé. He has taken Petronella as payment for her father's debts and unknown to Leonardo he also works for the mysterious Luminari.
5	5	"It Must Be Love"	Beryl Richards	Brian Jordan	2 May 2011
Romance is in the air when Lorenzo's spoilt cousin falls in love with Lisa in her disguise as Tom.
6	6	"The Lightning Box"	Luke Watson	Kirstie Falkous	9 May 2011
Piero is to hold an exhibition of the greatest treasures in Europe including the mystical Lighting Box. Lorenzo helps Leonardo borrow it from the palace but their plan goes awry when someone from Mac's past shows up with his own sights on the box.
7	7	"Time Waits"	Beryl Richards	Alexander Perrin	16 May 2011
Leonardo and his friends discover a watch that may hold the key to time itself.
8	8	"Angels and Cherubs"	Luke Watson	Pia Ashberry, Dan Danko, Tom Mason	23 May 2011
Tensions end up running high when Leonardo and Lisa finds themselves pitted against their rival Michelangelo in Florence's art competition.
9	9	"Lost and Found"	Luke Watson	Alexander Perrin	6 June 2011
When Lisa's mum arrives in Florence looking for her, her secret life living as a painter is close to being revealed. To protect her secret she enters an elaborate charade with Mac, as the pair preten
10	10	"Servants of Florence"	Beryl Richards	Brian Lynch	13 June 2011
There's a huge party in the Medici palace to celebrate a new charioteer. Lorenzo tells his friends they aren't invited but they sneak in anyway, Except the party ends up being full of more danger than celebration as Lisa realises Piero is the leader of the secret society who kidnaped her in episode one, and Mac is arrested for trespassing.
11	11	"Bandit Queen"	Beryl Richards	Brian Lynch	20 June 2011
Lorenzo falls in love with a commoner but soon finds out that following his heart could end up seeing both himself and his friends being led into danger. Meanwhile his friends sneak into the Medici palace to look for more information on Piero and the mysterious Lumanari.
12	12	"Fireball"	Luke Watson	Danny Peake	27 June 2011
Verrocchio is delighted when Piero requests his two young apprentices – Leo and Tom/Lisa – specifically for a special commission. But after the events of last episode Piero knows that Leonardo knows about his secret society, and that Lisa is a girl disguising herself as a boy. Leonardo and Lisa know there must be a sinister meaning behind the summons. Indeed, when they arrive there Piero shows Leonardo all the inventions he has created with Medici resources and Leonardo's designs. Leonardo is in awe and Piero manipulates him into helping with a design he is stuck on - a simple toy. Except, Piero has redesigned the toy into something deadly - a Fireball which he intends to give to the Duke.
13	13	"Enter the Robot"	Luke Watson	Brian Lynch	4 July 2011
Florence is thrown into panic by what appears to be a fire-breathing demon. Piero has used Leonardo's designs to build a mechanical man to kill the Duke and take over Florence. It's up to Leonardo and his friends must stop it before it is too late, but first they have to tell Lorenzo the truth about his father.

=== Series 2 (2012) ===
No. overall	No. in series	Title	Directed by	Written by	Original release date
14	1	"Framed/Illusion"	Rob Evans	Pia Ashberry	20 September 2012
Episode 1 and 2 originally aired as an hour long episode called Illusion. Piero's threat of revenge is still hanging over Leonardo and the gang, but Verrocchio ends up being the target when Piero has him framed for murder. To make matters worse the attorney on the side of the victim is Leonardo's deadbeat father. Meanwhile Lorenzo, who has been shunned from the gang during the events of the series one finale, tries his best to convince Piero to help Verrocchio.
15	2	"Perspective/Illusion"	Rob Evans	Pia Ashberry	20 September 2012
Episode 1 and 2 originally aired as an hour long episode called Illusion. With time running out, Leo embarks on a dangerous plan to spring his maestro from jail. If things go wrong, it won't just be Verrocchio's head on the chopping block...
16	3	"The Betrothal Ball"	Rob Evans	Pia Ashberry	27 September 2012
There is an evening of surprises and danger in store when the Medici throw a lavish masked ball in Lorenzo's honour. Lorenzo is horrified by this surprise betrothal and to make matters worse he is kidnapped alongside Lisa (who is mistaken for his fiancé). Will the gang be able to save Lorenzo and Lisa in time?
17	4	"Cat and Mouse"	Rob Evans	Pia Ashberry	4 October 2012
Lorenzo decides to live life on the wild side when he meets the fun-loving, carefree Bruno, but Mac is convinced Bruno is bad news. As Bruno secretly plots against Mac Lorenzo will have to discover who his true friends are to stop him. Guest starring Pam St. Clement as Mazzola.
18	5	"Diabolical Acts"	Rob Evans	Pia Ashberry	11 October 2012
When a travelling theatre group comes to Florence, the whole city is excited, especially Leo and Tom, who get starring roles in the play. But when the performance gets underway, something sinister is going on behind the scenes. The other two actors are planning on stealing the priceless Medici Sapphire from right under Lorenzo's nose.
19	6	"Dragon Hunt"	Rob Evans	Daniel Peak	18 October 2012
A young man asks Leo to help him solve the clues of an ancient treasure map, in order to find his missing brother. Leo follows the cryptic clues across the city, whilst Lisa and Mac become concerned of the man's intentions and try and follow the clues unsuccessfully. When Leonardo fails to return from the treasure hunt it's up to Mac and Lisa to save him. Meanwhile, Piero uses the Dragon Hunt as a distraction so he can murder the Duke and finally take over Florence while Leonardo and the gang are incapacitated.
20	7	"The Mask of Death"	Rob Evans	Alexander Perrin	25 October 2012
When Leo is given the task of making a death mask of the Duke, he soon realises the story of the Duke's death doesn't add up and begins a dangerous investigation. Leonardo finds evidence of poison around the Duke's mouth but when consulting a doctor about the poison Piero kills the physician, framing Milan for the crim. Leonardo is now convinced Milan killed the Duke and the Doctor and agrees to help Piero build a super weapon to avenge the Duke and fight the Milanese
21	8	"Stupid Cupid"	Rob Evans	Alexander Perrin	1 November 2012
Piero prepares for his coronation and Mac lands himself in hot water when he gets Lorenzo's fiancée (Angelica) mixed up with a vengeful smuggler. While confined, Angelica confides in Mac that she is only marrying Lorenzo to make her father happy, and the two bond, unexpectedly developing feelings for each other.
22	9	"The Tortoise and the Hare"	Steve Hughes	Pia Ashberry	8 November 2012
Leo's idea for a superweapon could prove fatal when his explosive tests enrage the new Duke of Florence.
23	10	"By the Sword"	Steve Hughes	Daniel Peak	15 November 2012
Tom's hot temper lands her in a duel with the world's number one fencing champion, while Leonardo begins work on building his superweapon. The fencing champion humiliates a little boy so Lisa challenges him to a duel but he laughs her off not believing girls can fight. She convinces Lorenzo to train her in fencing and later challenges the fencer again, this time dressed as Tomaso. Thanks to Lorenzo's training and a little help from her friends Lisa is able to defeat the arrogant fencer.
24	11	"Hitched"	Steve Hughes	Brian Jordan	22 November 2012
As the countdown to Lorenzo's wedding gets closer, the gang launch a risky scheme to try get him out of his big day. They forge a letter from a King and pretend Lisa is a scorned princess who was left at the altar and must marry quickly to avoid shame. Lorenzo's parents believe the lie and agree to the marriage, wanting more power and the bigger dowry the fake princess has to offer. Meanwhile Angelica opens up to her father and tells him that she doesn't want to marry Lorenzo. Her father is understanding and calls off the wedding. With no Angelica to marry and the fake princess leaving Lorenzo at the altar he is free from all pending arranged marriages. Angelica then leaves Florence, leaving Mac broken hearted as he had planned to run away with her.
25	12	"The Fugitive"	Steve Hughes	Brian Lynch and Pia Ashberry	29 November 2012
With the city on the brink of war and Piero's plans near completion, Leo risks everything to help a young girl and her grandma when they are accused of being Milanese spies. Guest starring Katie McGlynn as Lucia.
26	13	"The Dogs of War"	Steve Hughes	Pia Ashberry, Brian Lynch and Melanie Stokes	6 December 2012
After being betrayed by his master, Placidi reveals all of Piero's secrets to Leo. Leo and his friends must convince Duke Rocco of Piero's treachery and keep the superweapon from falling into Piero's hands. A plot full of twists and turns sees Leonardo, Mac and Rocco arrested for treason whilst Lorenzo has to choose one final time whether to trust his friends or his father.

== Spin-off online game ==
In 2012 an online game based on the second series was released. Entitled Leonardo, the game allows players to defeat the villain Il Drago who has stolen Leonardo's inventions. The game was nominated for a 2013 KidScreen Award for Best Companion Website.

== Accolades ==
In 2012, Leonardo won three KidScreen Awards for Best Non-Animated or Mixed Series, Best Music, and Best Design. It was also nominated for the Ivor Novello Award for Best Television Soundtrack, the Best Youth Program Award at the Banff World Media Festival, and the Award for Youth Fiction at the Rose d'Or. It was also nominated for a children's television award at the Prix Jeunesse International Festival in Munich.

== See also ==
- Da Vinci's Demons, another fictional account of Leonardo da Vinci's early life
- Cultural depictions of Leonardo da Vinci
- Personal life of Leonardo da Vinci
