= Groove High =

Disney Channel musical-comedy

- Genre: Musical; Comedy
- Created by: Frédéric Puech; Virgile Troullot
- Starring: Jonathan Bailey; Samantha Barks
- Opening theme: "When You Got Friends" (Performed by Jonathan Bailey and Samantha Barks)
- Composers: Eric Renwart; Marja Supponen
- Countries of origin: United Kingdom; France; Ireland; Belgium; China; Philippines
- Original languages: English; French
- No. of seasons: 1
- No. of episodes: 26

Production
- Executive producers: Frédéric Puech; Laura Perkins-Brittain; Paul Cummins
- Producers: Baljeet Rai; Siobhán Ní Ghadhra
- Production location: France
- Camera setup: Single-camera
- Running time: 22 minutes
- Production companies: Planet Nemo; Telegael; Nexus Factory; Jetoon Animation; Philippine Animators Group Inc.

Original release
- Network: Disney Channel
- Release: 10 November 2012 – 9 March 2013

Groove High is a musical-comedy television series which aired on Disney Channel in the United Kingdom from November 2012 to March 2013. A mixture of live action and animation, the series centers around touring rock pop stars Tom played by Jonathan Bailey and Zoe played by Samantha Barks as they reminisce their time at their performing arts high school Groove High.

== Premise ==
Each show begins in live action whereby Tom Mason (Jonathan Bailey) and Zoe Myer (Samantha Barks) are two rock pop stars touring with their band. Between shows they like to remember the good old days at their performing arts high school Groove High. As they remember key events the show presents their memories as animated flashbacks. Their memories are often slightly distorted or exaggerated and Tom and Zoe's live action counterparts frequently interrupt the flashbacks to disagree about how it really happened.

== Cast ==
=== Main ===
- Jonathan Bailey as Tom Mason
- Samantha Barks as Zoe Myer

=== Supporting ===
- Beth Chalmers as Coco
- Rupert Degas as Duke and Dr Khan
- Rasmus Hardiker as Baz
- Rebekah Staton as Vic

== Episodes ==
| No. | Title | Original release date |
|---|---|---|
| 1 | "Last Tango at A-List" | 10 November 2012 |
Zoe enters Tom in a song-writing competition, but doesn't think he'll have a chance of winning using the school's old studio, so she sneaks him into A-list's smart new studio.
| 2 | "The Inside Man" | 11 November 2012 |
Notoriously nasty TV talent-show judge, Sneerly Cruwell, is coming to audition kids for his show. Tom is sure to win until Duke steals his song.
| 3 | "He's Gotta Have It" | 17 November 2012 |
Tom plans to buy a shiny new guitar by busking on the promenade with Hillary, his battered old guitar. It's a good plan until Hillary goes missing.
| 4 | "The Boy in the Plastic Bubble" | 18 November 2012 |
Tom isolates himself in a plastic bubble in order to protect himself from the dangers of life.
| 5 | "The Fan" | 24 November 2012 |
Tom dreams of having a fan, but when super-fan Carla arrives the dream turns into a nightmare. Tom learns that being the object of hero worship can get annoying, and a little bit scary.
| 6 | "Not Quite the Sound of Music" | 25 November 2012 |
Tom accidentally becomes a pre-school pop superstar. He has to agree to a deal that sees him entertaining a particularly grubby and obnoxious bunch of toddlers.
| 7 | "Single White Guitarist" | 5 January 2013 |
Creepy kid Tommington arrives and Tom teaches him how to be cool. But Tommington is a quick learner, takes over as the coolest kid in school and plots to destroy Tom.
| 8 | "Reality Bites" | 6 January 2013 |
Tom invites a reality show into school, but it's owned by Duke's father. Duke uses it to promote Zoe's popularity and gets Tom thrown out of school - in a medieval catapult!
| 9 | "Zoe Dynamite" | 12 January 2013 |
Zoe runs unopposed for school president until Tom decides to oppose her. The political landscape gets ugly with mudslinging and nose picking.
| 10 | "A Little Fight Music" | 13 January 2013 |
Tom and Duke compete in the Krispy Kangaroo cereal jingle competition, and accidentally write the same tune. They're accused of cheating, can Zoe prove their innocence?
| 11 | "Big Night at Groove High" | 19 January 2013 |
Zoe leads a protest against the school chef, who quits in a huff, leaving Zoe to run the kitchen. But her cooking skills are sadly lacking, so Scoot pitches in to help.
| 12 | "There's Something About Rusty" | 20 January 2013 |
Big Hollywood star, Rusty Fountain picks Zoe as his leading lady in his next movie. Soon their on-screen romance is drifting off-screen too, making Tom and Duke so jealous that they work together to sabotage Zoe's role.
| 13 | "A Fright at the Opera" | 26 January 2013 |
Zoe's famous opera star mother is coming to Groove High, and Zoe's trying to find a way to break the news that she doesn't want to follow in her footsteps as a singer.
| 14 | "Slightly Ballroom" | 2 February 2013 |
Vic can't believe her bad luck being paired with the klutzy Tom in dance class, but she soon finds herself falling for Tom's charms and asks him out on a date.
| 15 | "Mr. and Mrs. Doubtfire" | 27 January 2013 |
Things get complicated when Tom and Baz are afraid to ask Zoe and Lena to the dance. Tom masquerades as new boy Dom, and Baz turns into Jazz, who becomes Lena's BFF.
| 16 | "The Secret Gardener" | 9 February 2013 |
Tom discovers that Groove High's new gardener is in fact Max Shredder, a guitar hero who mysteriously disappeared years ago. Tom pushes Max to re-enter the limelight, but his love of shrubs is hard to ignore.
| 17 | "Trading Places" | 2 December 2012 |
Duke and Vic swap schools with Duke at Groove High and Vic at A-List. It's a nightmare for Duke but a dream come true for Vic; apart from now having Coco as her new assistant, which gets annoying really fast.
| 18 | "The Lie Who Loved Me" | 8 December 2012 |
Taking Baz's advice, the Groove High Kids fake a song about working in a coal mine and being raised by evil step monkeys. The song becomes a hit and Duke blackmails them into becoming their manager.
| 19 | "Hatman Begins" | 9 December 2012 |
Tom and Zoe reminisce about their first day at Groove High: Tom goes from being nervous to being super nervous because he loses his lucky hat. Zoe must convince Tom that his talent is not in his hat, but in his heart.
| 20 | "Groovily Ever After" | 1 December 2012 |
A drama coach comes to help our gang stage Snow White, with Zoe in the lead. When Duke realizes that Tom's prince character would get to kiss Zoe, he hatches a devious plot to take over the role for himself.
| 21 | "School of Lock" | 15 December 2012 |
There's a thief at Groove High! A new security system is installed, but a glitch causes the whole school to go into lock-down, trapping everyone including Duke, Tom and Zoe in the bathroom!
| 22 | "My Cousin Tommy" | 16 February 2013 |
A DNA test reveals that Tom is part of Duke's family! Despite Tom's initial horror, he gets used to the perks but winds up hurting the feelings of his best friend Zoe. Tom has to decide between perks or friendship.
| 23 | "Text, Lies and Videogames" | 16 December 2012 |
A sleep-deprived Tom accidentally reveals his true feelings for Zoe via text. Baz comes to the rescue by convincing Zoe it was him. But now, he has to date her, and it's up to Tom to sabotage their budding relationship.
| 24 | "Jump Up the Volume" | 23 February 2013 |
Tom volunteers Zoe in Jump-Rope for the annual Sportzapalooza Sports Championship, but he soon has his eye on the prize of winning and pushes Zoe too far. When she quits, it's up to Tom to win back her friendship.
| 25 | "A Christmess Carol" | 2 March 2013 |
When Tom makes Zoe feel taken for granted, she questions what she's really doing at Groove High. Khan takes her on a time travelling journey to show her what life would be like at Groove High without her.
| 26 | "Duet the Right Thing" | 9 March 2013 |
It's the last day of school and Tom will not move onto second year unless he can make up six days of songwriting classes in one day. Tom holds an internet songathon to make up time, which Duke quickly sabotages.

== Production ==
Groove High is co-produced by French company Planet Nemo, Irish company Telegael Teoranta and Belgian company Nexus Factory, which co-own copyright to the series. Voice recording work for the animated sections began in April 2010, with live action filming completed at Telegael Teoranta in Ireland in October 2011. Animation was completed by Chinese company Jetoon Animation and Filipino company Philippine Animators Group Inc., who also co-produced the series, which also co-own copyright to it. All music in the show including the theme song were originally written arranged and recorded by Belgian composers Eric Renwart and Marja Supponen, then sung by lead actors Bailey and Barks.

After the show ended, Bailey and Barks worked together again for the musical The Last Five Years at The Other Place in London, in 2016.

== Broadcast ==
The series aired on Disney Channel in the UK, France, Portugal, Italy, Spain, Australia, and New Zealand. It also aired on Kids Central in the United States, Teletoon+ in Poland, BBC Kids in Canada, Nickelodeon in the Benelux, Germany and Scandinavia, Arutz HaYeladim in Israel, PBS in Malta, TG4 in Ireland, Televisa in Latin America, YLE in Finland, TV5 Monde in France, MBC 4 in the Middle East and E-Junior in the United Arab Emirates.
