= Cock (play) =

2009 play by Mike Bartlett

- Written by: Mike Bartlett
- Genre: Drama
- Setting: London, England

Premiere
- Date: 13 November 2009
- Place: Royal Court Theatre

Cock is a 2009 British play by Mike Bartlett. It premiered at the Royal Court Theatre in London in November 2009 and centres on John, a gay man who feels torn after meeting and falling in love with a woman.

== Plot ==
In "Chapter 1," John tells his boyfriend "M" that he wants to take a break from their 7-year relationship because they argue frequently and are too different, and John moves out of their apartment. Some time later, John returns to M asking to get back together. He also reveals that he has had sex twice with a woman, despite identifying as gay his entire life and never being attracted to women before. M feels betrayed by John's infidelity and lack of commitment to him.

"Chapter 2" reveals how John met a woman, "W", on his daily commute. He is surprised to find himself developing a physical attraction to her and decides to have sex with a woman for the first time. W teaches him about vaginal sex and they both enjoy the experience. However, John then avoids W, during which time he attempts to convince M to take him back. John and W then prepare to have dinner at M's apartment; W expects that John will be breaking up with M to be with her.

In "Chapter 3," M and W meet for the first time at M and John's apartment in a scene reminiscent of a cockfight. M and W quickly begin fighting over John and whom he will pick. M tells W that while her relationship with John seems good now, over time she would learn of John's indecisiveness, laziness, and other negative qualities. M also reveals that he told his father, F, all about John's infidelity, and that F is also coming to dinner to convince John to stay with M. F arrives and says that John needs to stop being selfish and make a decision. John tells M that he loves him, but that W is a more fitting partner emotionally. However, John still questions if everyone is right that he is gay and cannot truly love W. W reminds John that they considered getting married and having children together, but he does not stop her when she leaves, saying that he thinks this is easier. M tells John that they can have children and any life they want together, but John is ultimately unable to agree to even turn off the lights.

== Production history ==
"Ben was so bang on because he just said you’ll get into a rehearsal room and work on it but when you put it in front of a live audience there is an outpouring and it just becomes a supernova of a theatrical experience and he was right. That first preview was something I’ll never forget."

— Jonathan Bailey on his conversation with Ben Whishaw who was the first actor to play John

=== West End (2009) ===
The play premiered at the Royal Court Theatre Upstairs, London, in November 2009, with Ben Whishaw as John, Andrew Scott as M, Katherine Parkinson as W and Paul Jesson as F; the original cast were recorded for a radio production broadcast on BBC Radio 3 in November 2011.

=== Off-Broadway (2012) ===
A production of the play was also put on at the Duke On 42nd Street, in New York City, in 2012, starring Cory Michael Smith as John.

=== Canada (2014) ===
In 2014, a French version of the play, translated and directed by Alexandre Goyette, was staged at the Espace 4001 theatre in Montreal, Quebec, with a cast including Michel-Maxime Legault as John, Goyette as M, Geneviève Côté as W, and Daniel Gadouas as F.

In the same year, a production by Studio 180 at The Theatre Centre in Toronto, Ontario, was directed by Joel Greenberg, and starred Andrew Kushnir as John, Jeff Miller as M, Jessica Greenberg as W, and Ian D. Clark as F. Clark won the Toronto Theatre Critics Award for Best Supporting Actor in a Play for his part.

=== Chichester Festival (2018) ===
The first major revival in the UK was commissioned by Chichester Festival Theatre in 2018 and played in the Minerva Theatre, directed by Kate Hewitt.

=== West End (2022) ===
The West End revival was headlined by Jonathan Bailey reuniting him with Marianne Elliott who directed him in the West End revival of Company in 2018. The acclaimed production had a limited 12-week run from March 2022 at the Ambassadors Theatre. The cast included Joel Harper-Jackson who replaced Taron Egerton as M after the latter dropped out, Jade Anouka as W, and Phil Daniels as F. All the members of the cast were encouraged to speak to a historian of sexuality about the play’s themes. The language has also been tweaked from the original 2009 version, according to Bailey, “so there’s no queer shaming or ideas of what is and isn’t normal.”

== Original casts ==
Character	West End (2009)	Off-Broadway (2012)	Chichester Festival (2018)	West End (2022)
John	Ben Whishaw	Cory Michael Smith	Luke Thallon	Jonathan Bailey
M	Andrew Scott	Jason Butler Harner	Matthew Needham	Taron Egerton replaced by Joel Harper-Jackson
W	Katherine Parkinson	Amanda Quaid	Isabella Laughland	Jade Anouka
F	Paul Jesson	Cotter Smith	Simon Chandler	Phil Daniels

== Reception ==
Michael Billington of The Guardian gave the play 3 stars out of 5, praising the play as a "sharp, witty study" that was less about "tortured bisexuality" and more about the "paralysing indecision that stems from not knowing who one really is." However, he notes that the play lacks social detail and character depth.

Alison Croggon, writing in The Guardian, gave the play 2 stars out of 5, described Cock as a story of a gay man's discovery of "the unexpected pleasures of Cunt." She criticizes the play's "uncomfortable subtext of misogyny" and describes the plot as "farcical".

In The Village Voice, Alexis Soloski describes the play as a "visceral, funny, anguished" production that "pits boy against girl, cock against cunt." She likens the final dinner scene to a gladiator's ring or a boxing round that ends up being "less a battle of the sexes than a battle of sexual orientation."

Writing for the Sydney Arts Guide, Richard Cotter described the play as a "robust, ribald and bollocking production" about a gay man who becomes "cock shocked and cunt struck" due to a "newfound fondness for vaginal sex and a future view of breeding fecundity". He praised Bartlett's "crisp script" which he felt perfectly describes the sexual confusion of a "man child who has his cock and wants to eat it too." Cotter notes the sizzling tension between the female lover and the cuckolded boyfriend, which leads to the play's "shattering climax".

Gay City News credited the play for "tackling thorny issues rarely seen on stage". Instead of the standard coming out narrative of the supposedly straight man "succumbing to the power of cock, there's a supposedly gay guy with a boyfriend falling for pussy", a theme that is handled by Bartlett's script with "sensitivity and acerbic wit." The play is critiqued as "gimmicky", but the "surprisingly steamy" and "brilliantly staged" sex scene is praised for eliciting nervous laughter and shocked reactions in the audience.

The Lifestyle Hub described the play as "a gay man's hilarious journey to heterosexual orgasm" that explores the "complexities of homosexuality." The play's "honest" and "straightforward" exploration of bisexuality shows that "Gay or not, people fall in love to those who can give us happiness." By presenting the story of a "bisexual gay" man who develops an attraction to the opposite sex, the play demonstrates the truth that "for some gays, they yearn for that happiness with other people regardless if they have vagina or... cock."

Mark Robins of Vancouver Presents has described the play as an exploration of identity and sexual fluidity that might appeal to a younger demographic, calling the play an "intellectual exercise on modern-day sexuality."

The play was banned in the local authority of Sotira, Cyprus, for its gay content.

Transport for London (TFL) censored the word "Cock" on posters advertising the 2022 revival in the London Underground. TFL's advertising policy says that an advertisement will be unacceptable if "it is likely to cause widespread or serious offense to reasonable members of the public" and/or "it could reasonably be seen as distasteful, indecent or obscene". The production's producer Chris Harper told Variety, "We were absolutely astounded that we could not use the word 'Cock' on the underground – it is 2022!"

== Awards and nominations ==
Year	Award	Category	Result
2010	Laurence Olivier Awards	Outstanding Achievement in an Affiliate Theatre	Won
