= South Downs (play) =

2011 play written by David Hare

South Downs is a 2011 play by the British playwright and author David Hare. It is set in 1962 in a public school, similar to Hare's own school, Lancing, in the South Downs. It is a response to Terence Rattigan's 1948 play The Browning Version and was commissioned by Rattigan's estate to mark Rattigan's Centenary.

It premiered alongside a revival of Rattigan's The Browning Version from 2 September to 8 October 2011 at the Minerva Theatre, Chichester (the small auditorium of the Chichester Festival Theatre). The two plays were directed separately by Jeremy Herrin (South Downs) and Angus Jackson (The Browning Version).

The plays re-opened after a sell-out run at Chichester, at the Harold Pinter Theatre, London, on 24 April 2012 for three-months.

A radio version was produced for BBC Radio 4, broadcast on 1 September 2012. It was also directed by Jeremy Herrin, produced by Catherine Bailey, and performed by the original cast members.

== Roles ==
Role	Premiere Cast, 14 September 2011 Minerva Theatre, Chichester	London Premiere Cast, 24 April 2012 London, Harold Pinter Theatre
John Blakemore	Alex Lawther	Alex Lawther
Rev. Eric Dewley	Nicholas Farrell	Nicholas Farrell
Belinda Duffield	Anna Chancellor	Anna Chancellor
Basil Spear	Andrew Woodall	Andrew Woodall
Jeremy Duffield	Jonathan Bailey	Jonathan Bailey
Colin J.T Jenkins	Bradley Hall	Bradley Hall
Tommy Gunter	Jack Elliot	Tom Spink
Roger Sprule	Liam Morton	Liam Morton
