= 16th Hollywood Music in Media Awards =

2025 awards ceremony

- Date: November 19, 2025
- Location: The Avalon, Hollywood
- Most wins: Sinners (3)
- Most nominations: Wicked: For Good (6)
- Website: www.hmmawards.com

The 16th Hollywood Music in Media Awards recognized the best in music in film, TV, video games, commercials, and trailers of 2025. The ceremony was held on November 19, 2025, at The Avalon in Hollywood, and was live-streamed globally for the first time, on the Laurel Canyon Live app.

The nominations were announced on November 5, 2025. The musical Wicked: For Good led the nominations with six, followed by the film Sinners and the video game Valorant, with five each.

The ceremony featured performances from Jeff Beal, Kesha, Aiyana-Lee, A. R. Rahman, Aryana Sayeed, and Diane Warren.

== Winners and nominees ==
=== Score ===
Original Score – Feature Film	Original Score – Independent Film
Sinners – Ludwig Göransson; Bugonia – Jerskin Fendrix; F1 – Hans Zimmer; Frankenstein – Alexandre Desplat; Hamnet – Max Richter; A House of Dynamite – Volker Bertelmann; Marty Supreme – Daniel Lopatin; One Battle After Another – Jonny Greenwood; Wicked: For Good – John Powell and Stephen Schwartz	Rule Breakers – Jeff Beal; The Ballad of Wallis Island – Adem Ilhan; Rabbit Trap – Lucrecia Dalt; Rental Family – Jónsi and Alex Somers; Truth & Treason – Aaron Zigman; Wet Paper Bag – Steve Gernes
Original Score – Animated Film	Original Score – Sci-Fi/Fantasy Film
Dog Man – Tom Howe; Arco – Arnaud Toulon; The Bad Guys 2 – Daniel Pemberton; Gabby's Dollhouse: The Movie – Stephanie Economou; Stitch Head – Nick Urata	Avatar: Fire and Ash – Simon Franglen; Captain America: Brave New World – Laura Karpman; Creation of the Gods II: Demon Force – Gordy Haab; The Fantastic Four: First Steps – Michael Giacchino; Jurassic World Rebirth – Alexandre Desplat; Momo – Fil Eisler; Thunderbolts* – Son Lux; Tron: Ares – Nine Inch Nails
Original Score – Horror/Thriller Film	Original Score – Documentary
Wolf Man – Benjamin Wallfisch; Black Phone 2 – Atticus Derrickson; Bring Her Back – Cornel Wilczek; Dangerous Animals – Michael Yezerski; Heart Eyes – Jay Wadley; The Other – Holly Amber Church	Pangolin: Kulu's Journey – Anne Nikitin; An American Miracle – Lolita Ritmanis; Arrest the Midwife – Allyson Newman; John Candy: I Like Me – Tyler Strickland; The Last Dive – Paul Leonard-Morgan; Why We Dream – Christian Lundberg
Original Score – Independent Film (Foreign Language)	Original Score – TV/Streamed Movie
Out of the Nest – Fabrizio Mancinelli; Catane – Emiliano Mazzenga; Dreaming of Lions – Toni M. Mir; Mārama – Karl Sölve Steven and Rob Thorne; Mina Samy – Mina Samy	Bridget Jones: Mad About the Boy – Dustin O'Halloran; Exterritorial – Sara Barone; Fountain of Youth – Christopher Benstead; Holiday Touchdown: A Bills Love Story – Tommy Fields; The Pickup – Christopher Lennertz; Zombies 4: Dawn of the Vampires – Tom Howe
Original Score – TV Show/Limited Series	Original Score – TV Show/Limited Series (Foreign Language)
Severance – Theodore Shapiro; Adolescence – Aaron May and David Ridley; Andor – Brandon Roberts and Nicholas Britell; Chad Powers – Natalie Holt; The Gilded Age – Harry Gregson-Williams and Rupert Gregson-Williams; Landman – Andrew Lockington; The Last of Us – Gustavo Santaolalla and David Fleming; The Studio – Antonio Sánchez; Wednesday – Chris Bacon; Your Friends & Neighbors – Dominic Lewis	Terra Alta – Arturo Cardelús; Al Batal – Suad Bushnaq; Carême – Guillaume Roussel; On the High Seas – Sandrine Rudaz; Red Alert – Ariel Blumenthal and Gal Lev
Original Score – Short Film (Live Action)	Original Score – Short Film (Animated)
El Lazo de Petra – Carl Thiel; Everything Must Go – Forrest Gray; Gesualdo – Finlay White; How to Drag a Boy – Kyle Simpson; The Lord of All Future Space and Time – Alexander Bornstein	Valorant – Qing Madi; All Hail the Duck King – Sam Rothera; Honor of Kings: "Kong Kong'er Champion Cinematic Short" – Obadiah Brown-Beach, Bastien Rousset, Henrik Lindström, 2WEI, Ruben K, Georg Mausolf, Sigurd Jøhnk-Jensen, and Nicholas Horsten; Love & Gold – Hayden Thompson and Miranda Tan; Wednesdays with Gramps – Raashi Kulkarni
Original Score – Short Film (Documentary)	Original Score – Documentary Series – TV/Digital
A Dream Called Khushi (Happiness) – Benjamin Westphalen; Cindy Tran: From Here to Here – Oscar Pan; La Mar – Juan Carlos Enriquez; The Light of Immortality – Michał Drabczyk; Love, Chinatown – Katya Richardson; Stone Biter – Alexander Leeming Froudakis and Manuela Lubrano	Chef's Table: Legends – Duncan Thum and David Bertok; American Manhunt: Osama Bin Laden – Jasha Klebe; The Americas – Hans Zimmer, Kara Talve, and Anže Rozman; Secrets of the Penguins – Nainita Desai; Turning Point: The Vietnam War – John Dragonetti
Original Score – Video Game (Console & PC)	Original Song/Score – Mobile Video Game
League of Legends: Welcome to Noxus – Bill Hemstapat, Sebastien Najand, Alex Seaver, J.D. Spears, Alexander Temple, Richard Thomson, Seth Tsui, Gong Ao, and Merlin Cen; Death Stranding 2: On the Beach – Ludvig Forssell; Dune: Awakening – Knut Avenstroup Haugen; Fallen Aces: Episode 1 – Josh Barron; Ghost of Yōtei – Toma Otowa; Indiana Jones and the Great Circle – Gordy Haab; Mafia: The Old Country – BT; The Rogue Prince of Persia – Danny Asadi; Spirit of the North 2 – Pav Gekko; Sword of the Sea – Austin Wintory	AFK Journey – Alec Justice; Delta Force – Delta Force Music Team; Honor of Kings – Matthew Carl Earl and Laurent Courbier; Identity V: Gambler in the Spotlight – Zhang Guanglei and Wang Jingfei; Valorant – bbno$

=== Song ===
Original Song – Feature Film	Original Song – Independent Film
"I Lied to You" from Sinners – Written by Raphael Saadiq and Ludwig Göransson; Performed by Miles Caton; "Dream as One" from Avatar: Fire and Ash – Written by Miley Cyrus, Mark Ronson, Andrew Wyatt, and Simon Franglen; Performed by Miley Cyrus; "Drive" from F1 – Written by Ed Sheeran, Blake Slatkin, and John Mayer; Performed by Ed Sheeran; "The Girl in the Bubble" from Wicked: For Good – Written by Stephen Schwartz; Performed by Ariana Grande; "Last Time (I Seen the Sun)" from Sinners – Written by Alice Smith, Miles Caton, and Ludwig Göransson; Performed by Miles Caton and Alice Smith; "Lose My Mind" from F1 – Written by Don Toliver, Doja Cat, Hans Zimmer, Ryan Tedder, and Grant Boutin; Performed by Don Toliver featuring Doja Cat; "No Place Like Home" from Wicked: For Good – Written by Stephen Schwartz; Performed by Cynthia Erivo	"Highest 2 Lowest" from Highest 2 Lowest – Written by Aiyana-Lee Anderson and Nicole Daciana Anderson; Performed by Aiyana-Lee; "Learn to Let Go" from Everything to Me – Written by Stephanie Economou, Maggie McClure, Chloé Caroline Fellows, and Jon Monroe; Performed by Maggie McClure, Chloé Caroline, and Stephanie Economou; "My San Francisco" from Plainclothes – Written and performed by Emily Wells; "Time Is All We Have" from Momo – Written by Fil Eisler and Sam Ryder; Performed by Sam Ryder; "We Believe in Hope" from Rule Breakers – Written by Jeff Beal, Joan Beal, and Aryana Sayeed; Performed by Aryana Sayeed and the Brooklyn Youth Chorus
Original Song – Animated Film	Original Song – Documentary
"Golden" from KPop Demon Hunters – Written by Ejae, Mark Sonnenblick, Joong Gyu Kwak, Yu Han Lee, Hee Dong Nam, Jeong Hoon Seo, and Park Hong Jun; Performed by Ejae, Audrey Nuna, and Rei Ami; "Best Time Ever" from Snoopy Presents: A Summer Musical – Written by Alan Zachary, Michael Weiner, and Jeff Morrow; Performed by cast; "Goodlife" from The Bad Guys 2 – Written by Daniel Pemberton, Gary Go, and Sanele David Sydow; Performed by Rag'n'Bone Man and WizTheMc; "Kaleidoscope" from Gabby's Dollhouse: The Movie – Written by Joseph Chase Atkins; Performed by Tehillah Alphonso and cast; "Open the Door" from The Twits – Written and performed by David Byrne and Hayley Williams; "Zoo" from Zootopia 2 – Written by Ed Sheeran, Blake Slatkin, and Shakira; Performed by Shakira	"Dear Me" from Diane Warren: Relentless – Written by Diane Warren; Performed by Kesha and Diane Warren; "Dying to Live" from Billy Idol Should Be Dead – Written by Billy Idol, J. Ralph, Steve Stevens, Tommy English, and Joe Janiak; Performed by Billy Idol and J. Ralph; "Have You Seen My Light" from October 8 – Written and performed by Autumn Rowe and Kizzo; "Milagros" from Karol G: Tomorrow Was Beautiful – Written by Carolina Giraldo Navarro, Edgar Barrera, Kevyn Mauricio Cruz, and Lenin Yorney Palacios; Performed by Karol G; "Salt then Sour then Sweet" from Come See Me in the Good Light – Written by Sara Bareilles, Andrea Gibson, and Brandi Carlile; Performed by Sara Bareilles and Brandi Carlile
Original Song – TV Show/Limited Series	Original Song – Video Game (Console & PC)
"The Dead Dance" from Wednesday – Written by Lady Gaga and Andrew Watt; Performed by Lady Gaga; "Afterlife" from Devil May Cry – Written by Amy Lee and Alex Seaver; Performed by Evanescence; "At Dawn I Look For You" from Étoile – Written by Loral Raphael and Ronnel Raphael; Performed by Sons of Raphael; "Give It a Good Try" from Unconventional – Written by Craig Richey; Performed by Craig Richey featuring Aubrey Shea; "The Line" from Arcane – Written by Tyler Joseph; Performed by Twenty One Pilots; "Rosebud" from Woman of the Dead – Written by Vera Marie Weber and Caleb Veazey; Performed by Vera Weber; "Turned to Black" from Black Rabbit – Written by Albert Hammond Jr. and Sarah Holt; Performed by the Black Rabbits (Albert Hammond Jr. and Jude Law); "Wolf Song" from Landman – Written and performed by Andrew Lockington	"Against the Tide" from Wuthering Waves – Written by Obadiah Brown-Beach; Performed by Forts and Obadiah Brown-Beach; "Coral Crown" from Hades II – Written by Darren Korb; Performed by Scylla and the Sirens; "Footsteps" from Rue Valley – Written and performed by Ana Krstajić; "Rivals 'Til the End" from Marvel Rivals – Written by Danny Koo, Marbling, Netease Sound, Masahiro Aoki, and H.K.H; Vocals by Chrissy Costanza; "The Rogue Prince of Persia" from The Rogue Prince of Persia – Written and performed by Daniel Asadi and XYE; "When the Sun is Low" from Dune: Awakening – Written by Knut Avenstroup Haugen; Performed by Clara Sorace, the Chamber Orchestra of London, Børre Flyen, and Knut Avenstroup Haugen
Song – Onscreen Performance (Film)	Song – Onscreen Performance (TV Show/Limited Series)
"I Lied to You" from Sinners – Performed by Miles Caton; "Golden" from KPop Demon Hunters – Performed by Ejae, Rei Ami, and Audrey Nuna (Huntrix); "Highest 2 Lowest" from Highest 2 Lowest – Performed by Aiyana-Lee; "Our Love" from The Ballad of Wallis Island – Performed by Tom Basden and Carey Mulligan; "Sunday Bloody Sunday" from Bono: Stories of Surrender – Performed by Bono	"Our Highway" from The Bondsman – Performed by Kevin Bacon; "Drugs in My Booty" from Harlem – Performed by Mark Sonnenblick; "Force of Nature" from Vampirina: Teenage Vampire – Performed by Kenzi Richardson; "The Hills of Tanchico" from The Wheel of Time – Performed by Nikhil Koparkar; "The Lies We Tell Our Hearts" from Electric Bloom – Performed by Lumi Pollack, Carmen Sanchez, and Ruby Marino
Song – Short Film	Original Song/Score – Commercial Advertisement
"Stars in My Eyes" from Sweetwater – Written by Sean Douglas; Performed by Kyra Sedgwick; "Car Keys" from Everything Must Go – Written by Forrest Gray, Tiffany So, and Saba Saghafi; Performed by Forrest Gray; "Down We Go" from Rabbit Rabbit – Written and performed by Zoë Lustri; "Sean is Three" from Sean the Baby – Written by Cameron Adams; Performed by Amelia Rolland; "Somos Fuertes" from Somos Fuertes – Written and performed by J. Frazil	Apple: "6 Our of 5 Stars – Silo: Music" – Neil Ormandy, Linkoln, and Allen Stone; Amazon Midnight Opus: "What the World Needs Now is Love" – Haim Mazar; The End of the Run is Just the Beginning – Alexandra Petkovski; Matter and Space: "Butterflies" – Alex Yewon; Sea of Remnants: "Yo Ho!" – Guanglei Zhang and Sibo Huang; Valorant: "In My Zone" – bbno$

=== Main Title Theme ===
Main Title Theme – TV Show/Limited Series	Main Title Theme – TV Show (Foreign Language)
Your Friends & Neighbors – Dominic Lewis and Hamilton Leithauser; Chief of War – Hans Zimmer, James Everingham, and Kaumakaiwa Kanaka'ole; Étoile – Sons of Raphael; Government Cheese – Pharrell Williams; Outlander: Blood of My Blood – Bear McCreary	On the High Seas – Sandrine Rudaz; Al Batal – Suad Bushnaq; Carême – Guillaume Roussel; Lam Shamseya – Mina Samy; Two Graves – Marc Timon

=== Music Supervision ===
Music Supervision – Film	Music Supervision – Television
Bridget Jones: Mad About the Boy – Nick Angel; The Ballad of Wallis Island – Gary Welch; Christy – Jemma Burns; Ruth & Boaz – Ashley Neumeister; Wicked: For Good – Maggie Rodford; Winter Spring Summer or Fall – Mike Turner and Jonathan Lane	Dexter: Resurrection – Sean Fernald; Étoile – Robin Urdang; Nobody Wants This – Manish Raval, Tom Wolfe, and Jonathan Leahy; Severance – George Drakoulias; The Summer I Turned Pretty – Melyssa Hardwick; Wednesday – Jen Malone and Nicole Weisberg; Yellowjackets – Nora Felder
Music Supervision – Video Game
Battlefield 6 – Steve Schnur; Assassin's Creed Shadows – Bénédicte Ouimet and Jérôme Angelot; Honor of Kings – Yuanye Huang, Jing Zhang, Shuqin Xiao, Peiyue Lu, and Samuel Siu; The Rogue Prince of Persia – Manu Bachet; The Sandbox: "2025 Seasons (5 & 6)" – Benjamin Beladi; Valorant – Jonny Altepeter

=== Other ===
Music Themed Film, Biopic or Musical	Music Documentary – Special Program
Wicked: For Good – Jon M. Chu; The Ballad of Wallis Island – James Griffiths; Song Sung Blue – Craig Brewer; Springsteen: Deliver Me from Nowhere – Scott Cooper; Zombies 4: Dawn of the Vampires – Paul Hoen	Diane Warren: Relentless – Bess Kargman; Billy Idol Should Be Dead – Jonas Åkerlund; Bono: Stories of Surrender – Andrew Dominik; I Was Born This Way – Daniel Junge and Sam Pollard; It's Never Over, Jeff Buckley – Amy J. Berg; Selena y Los Dinos – Isabel Castro
Soundtrack Album	Music Design – Trailer
F1 – Atlantic Records; Karma: The Dark World – Black Razor Records; KPop Demon Hunters – Republic Records; Sinners – Sony Masterworks Records; Wicked: For Good – Republic Records; World of Warcraft: Undermine – Blizzard Entertainment	Necaxa – Juan Carlos Enriquez; Delta Force – Peter Tomlinson; Destiny: Rising – Weicheng Xia and Guanglei Zhang; Project Spectrum – Ludvig Forssell; Sea of Remnants (Yo Ho!) – Guanglei Zhang and Sibo Huang; Valorant – Qing Madi; Wet Paper Bag – Steve Gernes
Music Video (Independent)	Live Concert for Visual Media
"Afterlife" – Evanescence; "Bite Marks" – Teya; "Just Human" – Mohammed Paika; "Refuge" – Gabrielle Aapri; "Symphony" – Alexandra Fresquez; "They Know" – Matt B, Rocky Dawuni, Tony Succar, and Wouter Kellerman	The Lion King at the Hollywood Bowl – The Lion King cast; Beyond the World – Yufan Xu, Xihao Wang, and the China Broadcasting Chinese Orchestra; Garden State 20th Anniversary Concert – The Shins, Iron & Wine, Frou Frou, Cary Brothers, Laufey, Thievery Corporation, Colin Hay, Madison Cunningham, Remy Zero, The Milk Carton Kids, Sophie Barker, and Bonnie Somerville; Infinity Concert – Jason Huang; Not Gonna Lie, Live from Ruthmere Museum – Abbie Thomas
Exhibitions, Theme Parks, Special Projects
Walt Disney World's Epcot: Test Track – Zain Effendi; Dark Castle (XD Dark Ride) – Benjamin Botkin, Carl Vaudrin, and Benjamin Beladi; Dreamland Theme Park – Chris Thomas; One Step Beyond: A Journey to Mars – Rhian Sheehan; Scadstory Atlanta – Erik Desiderio; Snapshot – Eduardo Andrade; Tapestry of Happiness – Haim Mazar

=== Special Recognition ===
Music Performance / Special Program	Song – Documentary Series – TV/Limited Series
Wicked: One Wonderful Night	"Go Steady" from Parenthood – Written by Tom Howe and Sam Ryder
Song/Score – New Media
"La Pandora's Box" – Written by Victoria Dawson, Nadeem Majdalany, Camille J. Thomas, Carmen A. Thomas, Shannon K, Luke Shrestha, and Simon Jay; Performed by memyself&vi
