= Priscilla (soundtrack) =

Priscilla (Original Motion Picture Soundtrack)

Soundtrack album by various artists
- Released: November 2, 2023
- Genre: Film soundtrack
- Length: 59:20
- Label: ABKCO; A24
- Compiler: Phoenix; Randall Poster

Singles from Priscilla (Original Motion Picture Soundtrack)
- 1. "My Elixir" Released: November 2, 2023

Priscilla (Original Motion Picture Soundtrack) is the soundtrack to the 2023 film Priscilla, directed by Sofia Coppola. Based on the life of actress Priscilla Presley and her relationship with singer-actor Elvis, the film stars Cailee Spaeny and Jacob Elordi as the respective main characters. The soundtrack was supervised by the French indie pop band Phoenix and Randall Poster. The former, which contributed to elements of the film score not included in the soundtrack. The soundtrack also features contributions from the duo Sons of Raphael.

The soundtrack includes 17 of the 51 musical selections used in the film. "My Elixir", a cover song by Sons of Raphael of a track from Phoenix's 2022 studio album Alpha Zulu, was released as the lead single. The soundtrack was published under the A24 Music and ABKCO Records labels on November 2, 2023. Critics praised the anachronistic soundtrack choices as well as Phoenix's score.

== Background ==
The French indie pop band Phoenix, led by Coppola's husband and musician Thomas Mars, composed original music for the film. Besides composing, they also supervised the film's music along with Randall Poster. During production, Poster did not use temp music and instead included songs that underscored the film. Because of this, the film did not have a music credit; instead, Phoenix and Poster were both credited for music supervision. Mars also stated that they wanted to have credits for music direction, but they had to be dropped due to disapproval from the Directors Guild of America. The duo Sons of Raphael was heavily involved in the film's music curation process, and composed or covered several songs for the film.

Speaking to The Hollywood Reporter, Coppola said that the film does not feature any of Elvis Presley's music as Elvis Presley Enterprises—which is majority owned by the branding company Authentic Brands Group, with the remainder owned by Presley's family—denied its usage in the film. She said "they don't like projects that they haven't originated, and they're protective of their brand." However, she felt that the restriction made her more creative with the score. Much like the soundtrack for Coppola's 2006 film Marie Antoinette, most of the film's music was anachronistic to the time period.

The film opens with Alice Coltrane's "Going Home", which transitions into the 1980s cover version of the Ronettes' 1963 single "Baby, I Love You", performed by the punk rock band the Ramones. Alice's son Ravi Coltrane supervised the usage of his mother's music. Ravi did not approve a second Alice Coltrane song which was intended to be used during a scene in which Priscilla and Elvis experiment with LSD, stating that his mother would not have wanted her music to be associated with drugs.

A cover of Frankie Avalon's 1959 single "Venus", created by Phoenix, plays during the first meeting between Elvis and Priscilla. This song becomes the main theme of the couple throughout the film. "Crimson and Clover" performed by Tommy James and the Shondells is played during the duo's first kiss. Poster described the song as "epic as Mozart or Beethoven – it encapsulates every adolescent emotion possible". Mars also felt the song expressed a love for Americana music.

Coppola did not want the soundtrack to sound "corny". Coppola was inspired by Phil Spector's works, using his sound "to tie things together" and "[embracing] the melodrama of strings and big production". Coppola, Mars, Poster and editor Sarah Flack also discussed the importance of silence in underscoring emotional moments in the film.

In the final moments of the film, as Priscilla leaves Graceland for the last time, the song "I Will Always Love You" by Dolly Parton (not included in the soundtrack) plays. Mars instructed the producer Youree Henley to use the song irrespective of budget constraints, as it served the emotional quotient for the film.

Two Elvis-adjacent songs were used in the film: American Civil War song "Aura Lea", which is the basis of Elvis' 1956 single "Love Me Tender", and the Jerry Reed song "Guitar Man", which Elvis famously covered. The team reached out to different Elvis impersonators to record covers of the songs, which the team described as a fun process.

Approximately 51 songs were used in the film, and 16 were included in the official soundtrack. Sons of Raphael covered the track "My Elixir" from Phoenix's studio album Alpha Zulu (2022) and released as a single on November 2, 2023. The same day, ABKCO Records in collaboration with A24 Music released the film's soundtrack consisting of the 17 total aforementioned tracks.

Coppola told E! News that she hoped to get Lana Del Rey to record a song for the film's soundtrack after learning that the singer's fans associate her with Priscilla, but it was not possible due to timing issues.

== Reception ==
The soundtrack was overall well-received by critics. Allison Wilmore of Vulture, Stephanie Zacharek of Time and Ben Kenigsberg of The New York Times complimented the use of the anachronistic soundtrack as "lush" and "nonpareil". Kenigsberg felt that the non-usage of Elvis Presley's music brought the film closer to Coppola's aesthetics and avoided making the film a conventional biopic, and Wilmore noted that the music "doesn't play like an omission so much as it does a statement". David Rooney of The Hollywood Reporter wrote that "[the] music by French synth-pop band Phoenix fits with Coppola's firm command of mood in ways that recall the Air soundtrack for The Virgin Suicides, further enhanced by a multitude of sharp song choices."

Chris Bumbray of JoBlo.com described the score as "terrific", and Marlow Stern of Rolling Stone said that it "knocks out of the park". Phil de Semlyen of Time Out said that Coppola's "trademark anachronistic soundtrack choices and Phoenix's score blend seamlessly in with '60s tunes".

Edward Douglas of Below the Line wrote, "There is no delineation between their roles, as Poster's time-appropriate song selections perfectly accent Phoenix's score with the music greatly elevating every moment." Luke Hicks of The Film Stage called the soundtrack as "the year's best" and Phoenix's score "fill the gaps nicely". Lex Briscuso of Film School Rejects said that Phoenix's score "nicely complements the existing musical selections and cements a cohesive soundscape for the film and its tonal goals".

== Track listing ==
No.	Title	Artist(s)	Length
1.	"Going Home"	Alice Coltrane	9:57
2.	"Baby, I Love You"	Ramones	3:45
3.	"Venus"	Frankie Avalon	2:22
4.	"Sweet Nothin's" (single version)	Brenda Lee	2:23
5.	"Crimson and Clover"	Tommy James and the Shondells	3:28
6.	"(I Love You) For Sentimental Reasons" (single version)	The Righteous Brothers	2:47
7.	"How You Satisfy Me"	Spectrum	4:10
8.	"Country"	Porches	1:50
9.	"The Crystal Cat"	Dan Deacon	3:49
10.	"Forever"	The Little Dippers	2:24
11.	"Wade in the Water"	The Soul Stirrers	3:06
12.	"Goin' Places"	The Orlons	2:29
13.	"Stratus"	Kaitlyn Aurelia Smith	3:02
14.	"Nobody Knows"	T. L. Barrett and the Youth Christ Choir	6:28
15.	"Gassenhauer"	Erik Charlston	0:46
16.	"Rippling Waters"	Speedy West	2:45
17.	"My Elixir"	Sons of Raphael	3:49
Total length:			59:21
