= Hollywood Music in Media Award for Best Original Song in a TV Show/Limited Series =

American media music award

Hollywood Music in Media Award for Best Original Song – TV Show/Mini Series
- Country: United States
- Presented by: Hollywood Music in Media Awards (HMMA)
- First award: 2015
- Currently held by: Marcus "Bellringer" Bell "Walk with Kings" (2026)
- Website: www.hmmawards.com

The Hollywood Music in Media Award for Best Original Song – TV Show/Mini Series is one of the awards given annually to people working in the television industry by the Hollywood Music in Media Awards (HMMA). It is presented to the lyricists, musicians and performers who have crafted the best "original" song, specifically for a television series or miniseries. The award was first given in 2015, during the sixth annual awards.

== Winners and nominees ==
=== 2010s ===
Best Original Song – TV Show/Digital Series

Year	Program	Song	Nominees	Network
(2015); 6th
(2015); 6th	Glee	"This Time"	Darren Criss (music & lyrics), Lea Michele (performer)	Fox
(2015); 6th	The Comedians	"Kiss an Old Man"	Robert Lopez (music); Kristen Anderson-Lopez (lyrics); Billy Crystal, Josh Gad (performers)	FX
(2015); 6th	Empire	"Good Enough"	Timbaland (music); Jim Beanz, Daniel Jones (music & lyrics); Yazz Bryshere, Taraji P. Henson, Terrence Howard, Jussie Smollett (performers)	Fox
(2015); 6th	Inside Amy Schumer	"Girl You Don't Need Make Up"	Kyle Dunnigan (musics & lyrics), Jim Roach (music)	Comedy Central
(2015); 6th	Sons of Anarchy	"Come Join the Murder"	Jake Smith (music, lyrics, performer); Kurt Sutter, Bob Thiele Jr. (music & lyrics); The Forrest Rangers (performers)	FX
(2015); 6th	Suits	"When I Go"	Keaton Simons (music, lyrics, performer); Smith Carlson, Laura Goldfarb (music & lyrics)	USA

Best Original Song – TV Show/Limited Series

Year	Program	Song	Nominees	Network
(2017); 8th
(2017); 8th	The Get Down	"Power"	Donna Missal (lyrics/performer); Baz Luhrmann, Homer Steinweiss, Elliott Wheeler (lyrics); Travis Jones (performer)	Netflix
(2017); 8th	Crazy Ex-Girlfriend	"We Tapped That Ass"	Rachel Bloom (lyrics/performer), Adam Schlesinger (music), Jack Dolgen (lyrics)	The CW
(2017); 8th	Luke Cage	"Bulletproof Love"	Method Man (lyrics/performers)	Netflix
(2017); 8th	Once Upon a Time	"Powerful Magic"	Michael Weiner, Alan Zachary (musics & lyrics); Josh Dallas, Ginnifer Goodwin (performers)	ABC
(2017); 8th	Patriot	"Charles Grodin"	Michael Dorman (lyrics/performer), Steven Conrad (lyrics)	Amazon Prime Video

Best Original Song – TV Show/Mini Series

Year	Program	Song	Nominees	Network
(2018); 9th
(2018); 9th	The Innocents	"The Innocents"	Carly Paradis (music & lyrics); EERA (performer)	Netflix

Best Original Song – TV Show/Limited Series

Year	Program	Song	Nominees	Network
(2019); 10th
(2019); 10th	Sherman's Showcase	"Time Loop"	Phonte Coleman (music/lyrics); Lorenzo Ferguson (music); Rob Haze, Diallo Riddle, Bashir Salahuddin, Evan Williams (lyrics); Galaxia (performer)	IFC
(2019); 10th	Documentary Now!	"Holiday Party (I Did a Little Cocaine Tonight)"	Eli Bolin (music); John Mulaney, Seth Meyers (lyrics); Alex Brightman, Renée Elise Goldsberry, The Cast of Co-Op (performers)	IFC
(2019); 10th	The Righteous Gemstones	"Misbehaven'"	Joseph Stephens (music/lyrics); Danny McBride, Edi Patterson (lyrics); Walton Goggins, Jennifer Nettles (performers)	HBO
(2019); 10th	Vida	"Mi Locura"	Karen Freire, Adrianne Gonzalez, Sarah Alison Solovay (lyrics); Kablito (performer)	Starz

=== 2020s ===
Year	Program	Song	Nominees	Network
(2020); 11th
(2020); 11th	Euphoria	"All for Us"	Labrinth (writer/performer), Zendaya (performer)	HBO
(2020); 11th	The Eddy	"The Eddy"	Glen Ballard, Randy Kerber (writers); The Eddy Band, Joanna Kulig (performers)	Netflix
(2020); 11th	Lovecraft Country	"Tulsa, 1921 (Catch the Fire)"	Laura Karpman, Raphael Saadiq (writers); Janai Brugger (performer)	HBO
(2020); 11th	The Marvelous Mrs. Maisel	"One Less Angel"	Thomas Mizer, Curtis Moore (writers); Darius de Haas (performer)	Amazon
(2020); 11th	Seven Worlds, One Planet	"Out There"	Sia (writer/performer); Hans Zimmer, Christopher Braide (writers)	Netflix
(2020); 11th	The Witcher	"Toss a Coin to Your Witcher"	Sonya Belousova, Giona Ostinelli, Jenny Klein (writers); Joey Batey (performer)	Netflix
(2021); 12th
(2021); 12th	We the People	"Change"	H.E.R. (writer/performer); Ronald Colson, Jeff Gitelman, David Harris and Maxx Moore (writers)	Netflix
(2021); 12th	Bo Burnham: Inside	"Welcome to the Internet"	Bo Burnham (writer/performer)	Netflix
(2021); 12th	Dear White People	"Together All the Way"	Kris Bowers & Siedah Garrett (writers); Cast (performers)	Netflix
(2021); 12th	Schmigadoon!	"With All of Your Heart"	Cinco Paul (writer); Ariana DeBose and The Kids of Schmigadoon! (performers)	Apple TV+
(2021); 12th	Trying	"Neck of the Woods"	Maisie Peters (writer/performer); Joe Rubel (performer)	Apple TV+
(2022); 12th
(2022); 12th	The Afterparty	"Two Shots"	Jack Dolgen and Jonathan Lajoie (writers); Ben Schwartz (performer)	Apple TV+
(2022); 12th	Godfather of Harlem	"If I Should Die Tonight"	Ralph Johnson and Douglas Gibbs (writers); Ron Isley (performer)	Epix
(2022); 12th	High School Musical: The Musical: The Series	"Right Place"	William Behlendorf, Jason Mater and Brandon C. Rogers (writers); Adrian Lyles (performer)	Disney+
(2022); 12th	The Marvelous Mrs. Maisel	"Maybe Monica"	Thomas Mizer and Curtis Moore (writers); Josh A. Dawson (performer)	Prime Video
(2022); 12th	Slow Horses	"Strange Game"	Mick Jagger (writer/performer) and Daniel Pemberton (writer)	Apple TV+
(2023); 14th
(2023); 14th	Ted Lasso	"Fought & Lost"	Jamie Hartman, Sam Ryder and Tom Howe (writers); Sam Ryder (performer)	Apple TV+
(2023); 14th	Daisy Jones & the Six	"Look At Us Now (Honeycomb)"	Blake Mills and Marcus Mumford (writers); Riley Keough and Sam Claflin (performers)	Amazon Prime Video
(2023); 14th	Jane	"One Step Closer"	Diane Warren (writer); Leona Lewis (performer)	Apple TV+
(2023); 14th	Only Murders in the Building	"Which of the Pickwick Triplets Did It?"	Benj Pasek, Justin Paul, Marc Shaiman, and Scott Wittman (writers); Steve Martin (performer)	Hulu
(2023); 14th	The Marvelous Mrs. Maisel	"Your Personal Trash Man Can"	Curtis Moore and Thomas Mizer (writers); cast (performers)	Amazon Prime Video
(2024); 15th
(2024); 15th	The Tattooist of Auschwitz	"Love Will Survive"	Hans Zimmer, Kara Talve, Walter Afanasieff and Charlie Midnight (writers); Barbra Steisand (performer)	Stan/Sky Atlantic/Peacock
(2024); 15th	Genius: MLK/X	"Jericho"	Jacob Banks and Nayla 'Sillkey' Nyassa (writers); Jacob Banks (performer)	National Geographic
(2024); 15th	The Boys	"Let's Put the Christ Back In Christmas"	Christopher Lennertz (writer); Shoshana Bean, Andrew Rannells, James Monroe Iglehart and Christopher Lennertz (performers)	Amazon Prime Video
(2024); 15th	Arcane League of Legends	"The Line"	Tyler Joseph (writer); Arcane and Twenty One Pilots (performers)	Netflix
(2024); 15th	Girls5eva	"The Medium Time"	Sara Bareilles (writer/performer)	Peacock
(2024); 15th	The Acolyte	"The Power of Two"	Michael Abels, D'Mile and Victoria Monét (writers); Victoria Monét (performer)	Disney+
(2025); 16th
(2025); 16th	Wednesday	"The Dead Dance"	Lady Gaga and Andrew Watt (writers); Lady Gaga (performer)	Netflix
(2025); 16th	Devil May Cry	"Afterlife"	Amy Lee and Alex Seaver (writers); Evanescence (performer)	Netflix
(2025); 16th	Étoile	"At Dawn I Look For You"	Loral Raphael and Ronnel Raphael (writers); Sons of Raphael (performer)	Amazon Prime Video
(2025); 16th	Unconventional	"Give It a Good Try"	Craig Richey (writer); Craig Richey and Aubrey Shea (performers)	Revry
(2025); 16th	Woman of the Dead	"Rosebud"	Vera Marie Weber and Caleb Veazey (writers); Vera Weber (performer)	Netflix
(2025); 16th	Arcane	"The Line"	Tyler Joseph (writer); Twenty One Pilots (performer)	Netflix
(2025); 16th	Black Rabbit	"Turned to Black"	Albert Hammond Jr. and Sarah Holt (writers); The Black Rabbits (Albert Hammond Jr. and Jude Law) (performers)	Netflix
(2025); 16th	Landman	"Wolf Song"	Andrew Lockington (writer/performer)	Paramount+
(2026); 17th
(2026); 17th	The Greatest	"Walk with Kings"	Marcus "Bellringer" Bell (writer/performer)	Amazon Prime Video
(2026); 17th	The Lord of the Rings: The Rings of Power season 3	"Morning Shall Come"	Bear McCreary and Aurora (writers/performers); JD Payne (writer)	Amazon Prime Video
(2026); 17th	The Pitt	"Need Someone"	Gavin Brivik (writer); Andrew Bird (writer/performer)	HBO Max
(2026); 17th	The Boys	"Raise Him Up"	Christopher Lennertz (writer); Daveed Diggs (writer/performer)	Amazon Prime Video
(2026); 17th	South Park	"We are South America"	Brad Paisley (writer/performer)	Comedy Central/Paramount+
(2026); 17th	The Devil Between Us	"Well" ("好好")	Aili Sun (writer); Jam Hsiao (performer)	iQIYI
(2026); 17th	Sugarcreek Amish Mysteries	"Worlds Collide"	Sandro Morales-Santoro and Glenna Gasparian (writers/performers)	UPTV
