= Good Fortune (film) =

2025 American comedy film

- Theatrical release poster
- Directed by: Aziz Ansari
- Written by: Aziz Ansari
- Produced by: Aziz Ansari; Anthony Katagas; Alan Yang
- Starring: Seth Rogen; Aziz Ansari; Keke Palmer; Sandra Oh; Keanu Reeves
- Cinematography: Adam Newport-Berra
- Edited by: Daniel Haworth
- Music by: Carter Burwell
- Production companies: Garam Films; Oh Brudder Productions; Keep Your Head; Yang Pictures
- Distributed by: Lionsgate
- Release dates: September 6, 2025 (TIFF); October 17, 2025 (United States)
- Running time: 97 minutes
- Country: United States
- Language: English
- Budget: $30 million
- Box office: $26 million

Good Fortune is a 2025 American comedy film written and directed by Aziz Ansari in his feature directorial debut. Seth Rogen, Ansari, Keke Palmer, Sandra Oh and Keanu Reeves star in the film. It is produced by Garam Films, Oh Brudder Productions, Keep Your Head, and Yang Pictures. It follows an angel named Gabriel (Reeves), whose failed attempt to show Arj (Ansari), a struggling man, that money does not solve one's problems—by swapping the lives of him with his wealthy employer Jeff (Rogen)—results in Gabriel losing his wings, while the work he did as an angel begins to unravel around them.

After the suspension of his original directorial debut Being Mortal at Searchlight Pictures in 2022, Ansari moved forward with plans to direct Good Fortune. He wanted to make a comedy to be released in theaters, citing the success of Barbie (2023) as proof of the viability of such a project. Ansari's longtime friend Rogen, who inspired several elements of the film, joined shortly after Being Mortal was shelved.

The film was set to begin principal photography in May 2023, but due to a production shutdown in the middle of the month due to the 2023 Writers Guild of America strike, filming started in late January 2024 in Los Angeles, when Palmer joined the cast. The majority of filming wrapped before April 2024, with some scenes picked up later after an injury Reeves sustained two weeks into filming had healed.

Good Fortune premiered at the Toronto International Film Festival on September 6, 2025, and was released in the United States on October 17, 2025 by Lionsgate. The film received generally favorable reviews from critics and earned $26 million at the box office against a budget of $30 million.

== Plot ==
Gabriel is a low-ranking guardian angel whose job is to save people from crashing while texting and driving, but he wants to save lost souls which is the responsibility of another angel named Azrael, who is one of the few angels allowed to use his ability to "Guide a soul”. One day, he saves Arj, an aspiring documentarian who does odd jobs, works part time at a hardware store and lives in his car. Curious, Gabriel observes Arj for a few days.

Arj begins dating his coworker Elena who is trying to unionize the store. While doing tasks for hire, Arj meets Jeff, a wealthy tech investor, and Jeff hires Arj as his assistant. Jeff recommends a supposedly affordable restaurant for Arj to take Elena to, but when the restaurant ends up being very expensive, Arj uses Jeff's company credit card to pay for the meal. Jeff fires him as a result.

Arj discovers the app he previously used to earn money has banned him and he turns to donating plasma. He falls asleep afterward in a Denny's and discovers his car has been towed due to unpaid parking tickets. Sensing that Arj has hit rock-bottom, Gabriel shows himself to Arj and presents him with a vision of his future to inspire hope, but Arj perceives his future to be bleak. Gabriel tells him that having wealth and success like Jeff will not fix his problems, and switches Arj and Jeff's lives to prove his point. Arj discovers that he is now a wealthy tech investor with all of Jeff's assets and Jeff is now his assistant. To Gabriel's disappointment, Arj is ecstatic and realizes that being rich has solved most of his problems.

Gabriel's actions are discovered by Martha, his supervisor. She tells him that Arj needs to agree to switch back lives with Jeff, and takes away Gabriel's wings as punishment, which deprives him of some of his angel powers. During a party, Gabriel confronts Arj and gives Jeff his memories back, only to inadvertently send him into shock. The three discuss the situation, and Arj eventually agrees to switch back lives after a few more days, but refuses to assist Jeff financially so Jeff can see how Arj has lived. Gabriel tags along with Jeff, and they move into a motel and attempt to find income sources. They struggle to make money and end up sleeping in their car, and Jeff is shocked by how poorly gig workers are treated, as it's a business he has inadvertently made worse.

Arj approaches Elena and begins a relationship with her, but she breaks things off when he implies her union work is unimportant. While driving, he texts Elena in an attempt to reconcile and crashes his car, ending up in a coma. Martha fires Gabriel as the situation has become worse and turns him human. Gabriel gets a job as a dishwasher, and soon becomes frustrated by how difficult it is to make a living.

Arj wakes from his coma and feigns memory loss in order to avoid switching back with Jeff. After being fired as a delivery worker because the company has switched to robotic deliveries, Jeff plans to sneak into Arj's home and fence his expensive watches. He and Gabriel arrive as Arj is throwing himself a birthday party.

Arj encounters Elena working as a caterer at the party. At the end of the night, Elena tells him that being wealthy is not something she wants to be, but wants to continue to fight for what she believes in, even if it will not make her rich. Later, Arj stumbles on Jeff attempting to steal the watches and, frightened, shoots him in the arm and accidentally reveals his memory loss was fake. At the hospital, he agrees to switch back, but Gabriel says it cannot work unless Arj actually desires to go back to his own life out of hope and not merely guilt. Martha visits Gabriel and tells him that other people can inspire hope in each other; they do not always have to do it on their own or need angels.

Arj, Jeff and Gabriel go cumbia dancing with Elena and her friends. Arj tells Gabriel he is afraid of switching back because he will be struggling again and does not want to face the unknown. Gabriel tells him that he was scared after becoming human since he did not know what would happen, but while he has struggled with chain smoking, he has also enjoyed many worldly pleasures and had come to love everyone that he has met. Reassured by Gabriel's words, Arj willingly switches lives back with Jeff.

Arj is transported back to the time right after his car was towed, and Jeff is transported back to his normal life. Jeff pays Arj's impound fees, and during a meeting of one of the food delivery apps he invested in, demands to his board of directors that they treat the people working on the app much better with benefits and higher pay. With a new lease on life, Arj begins work on a documentary about gig workers and continues his romantic relationship with Elena, as Gabriel watches over them.

In the final scene, Arj and Elena have gotten tacos, and Arj leaves a taco behind for Gabriel, as he had previously promised to do. After a pause, the taco folds up and slowly lifts up off of the plate.

== Cast ==
- Seth Rogen as Jeff, a wealthy man who lives a life of luxury and excess. He owns several cars, a mansion with a pool and a disco club in the basement, and hosts wild parties. Following the angel Gabriel's intervention with Jeff's unlucky employee Arj, he and Arj have their lives swapped.
- Aziz Ansari as Arj, a struggling man. He ends up doing various odd jobs for his wealthy socialite employer Jeff, such as fixing his pool and finding him a shaman for an ayahuasca journey. After hitting rock bottom, he meets Gabriel, who tries to show him that money does not solve one's problems.
- Keke Palmer as Elena, who works at a hardware store with Arj. She fights for better working conditions and to unionize.
- Sandra Oh as Martha, an angel who takes Gabriel's wings
- Keanu Reeves as Gabriel, an angel. He tries to regain his wings after a plan to show a struggling man that wealth can not solve one's problems goes haywire, resulting in the man taking over his affluent employer's life. Normally, Gabriel is responsible for saving people from getting into road accidents due to texting while driving, but tries to show Arj that a life of wealth is "not all that it's cracked up to be".
- Matt Rogers as Peter, Jeff's colleague
- Felipe Garcia Martinez as Felipe, Gabriel's co-worker at a restaurant
- Stephen McKinley Henderson as Azrael, an angel who helps lost souls
- Penny Johnson Jerald as Elena's mother
- Sherry Cola as Linda, a partygoer who finds Gabriel attractive

== Production ==
=== Development ===
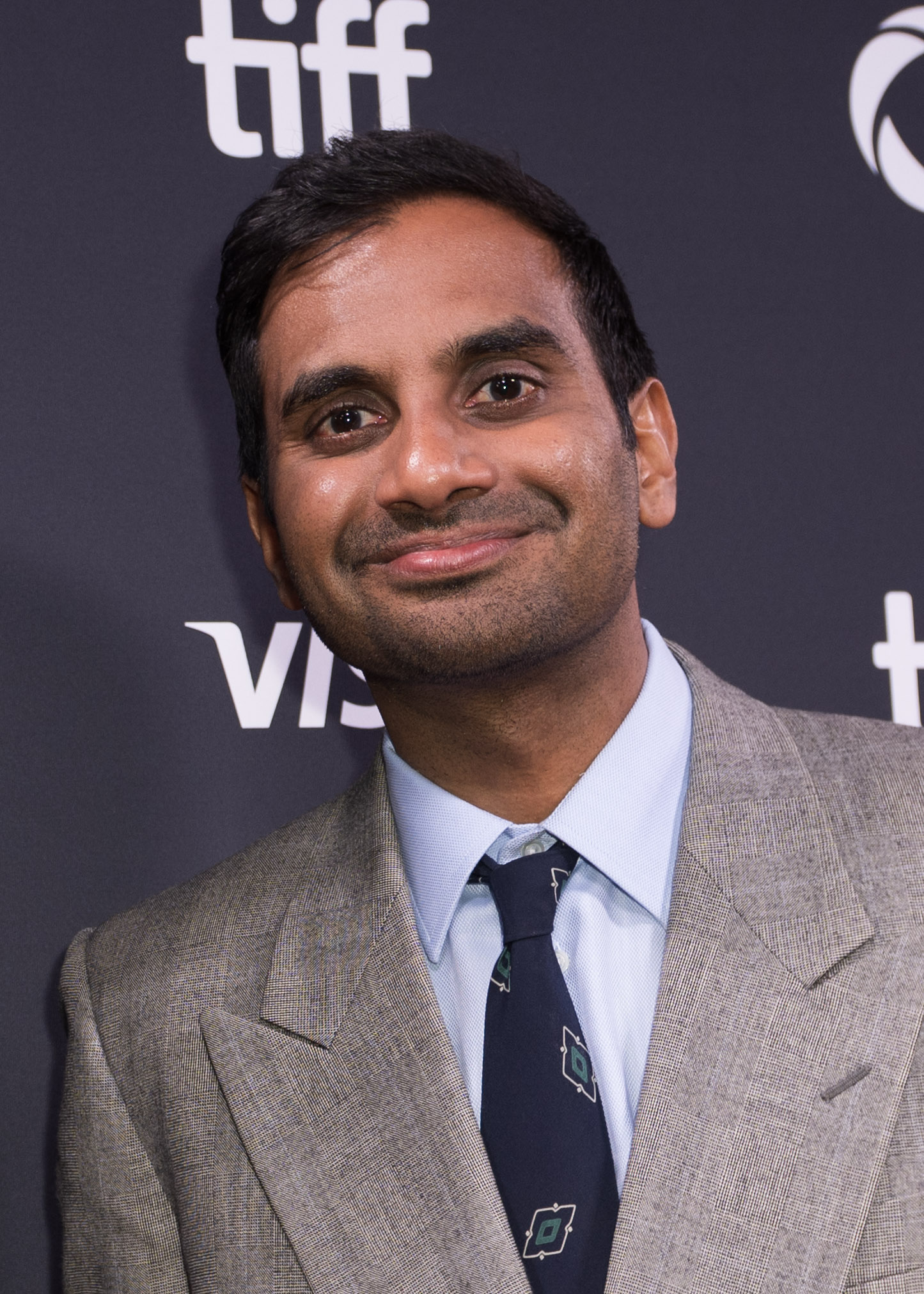
Aziz Ansari produced, wrote, directed and stars in Good Fortune.

After the suspension of his first directorial project Being Mortal at Searchlight Pictures in 2022 due to star Bill Murray's alleged inappropriate behavior, Aziz Ansari moved forward with Good Fortune, his next planned production. Ansari had been doing dramatic work, and wished to make a comedy to be theatrically released. Ansari believed in the viability of such a film, citing the success of Barbie (2023) as an example. He hoped that having an R-rated comedy in theaters would prove both the genre and format viable as well as lead to "shitty rip-offs".

Following negotiations with Dan Freedman, Phil Strina, John Biondo, and Matt Leonetti, the project was acquired by Lionsgate Films. Aniz Adam Ansari, Jonathan McCoy, Christopher Woodrow, and Connor DiGregorio are executive producers, while Brady Fujikawa and Jon Humphrey oversaw the production for Lionsgate. with Media Capital Technologies responsible for co-financing the film. It was officially announced in April 2023 to be produced by Anthony Katagas, Alan Yang and Ansari, with Ansari also acting as writer, director and co-star. Garam Films, Oh Brudder Productions, Keep Your Head, and Yang Pictures serve as production companies, with Lionsgate presenting the film in association with Media Capital Technologies.

=== Writing ===
Ansari expressed a desire to "write about things that everyone is dealing with that no one is talking about", and felt that struggling in life was a perfect example of this. Beyond it serving as the physical setting, Ansari considered the city of Los Angeles as its own character in Good Fortune, for its gig economy, propagation of food delivery robots, gentrification, the housing crisis and homelessness, themes reflected in the film. Ansari conducted research for the film, including interviewing gig workers to inform him what their way of life is like, and job shadowed food delivery drivers and worked in hardware stores. Ansari took inspiration from films It's a Wonderful Life and A Matter of Life and Death (both 1946). Aziz also referenced Wings of Desire as an influence in an interview on Fandango.

=== Casting ===
In April 2023, Keanu Reeves and Seth Rogen were revealed to be starring, with filming set to begin in May. Ansari and Rogen had been longtime friends and were looking to partner for a film. Following the shelving of Being Mortal, Ansari decided to be proactive in finding something else to do, calling Rogen with "a decent draft" of Good Fortune; two hours later, Rogen joined. Rogen inspired the implementation of several ideas in the script, such as a sauna and a cold plunge. Though doubtful that Reeves could take on the role of Gabriel when first considered due to Ansari believing "that guy just seems like he's on a different planet", the director was convinced upon meeting him. Ansari also associated Reeves with two formative films for himself, Speed (1994) and The Matrix (1999), which he said made him star-struck. To assuage this, Ansari invited Reeves over to his house for Indian food and conversation, then eating out for dinner and spending quality time. On April 5, 2024, it was reported that Sandra Oh had joined the cast.

=== Filming ===
Principal photography was expected to start on May 16, 2023, in Los Angeles, but was delayed indefinitely due to the 2023 Writers Guild of America strike. In November 2023, Deadline Hollywood reported the production was aiming to restart in early 2024. On January 25, 2024, Keke Palmer revealed in an Instagram post that filming with Ansari, Rogen, and Reeves had begun. Other sources further confirmed her casting. Filming with Reeves hooked into a rig atop a roof with a stunt double in Los Angeles occurred in February. Griffith Park Observatory also features in the film. Adam Newport-Berra served as cinematographer.

A photo of Reeves wearing crutches during a set break

Two weeks into shooting, photos of Reeves on set with crutches and an ice pack on his left knee circulated online. At the time, it was unclear if the medical aids were worn for his role or for the treatment of an actual injury. The viral images prompted some websites to report uncertainty surrounding the actor's health. Days later, Reeves was seen standing on set without assistance. In an interview during his panel for the film at the 2024 CinemaCon in April, Ansari addressed the media attention, noting that the hashtag #GetWellSoonKeanu had trended in response to the photos. He clarified that Reeves had fractured his knee during filming, noting the actor had tripped on a rug while inside his trailer. He said that Reeves continued to shoot the majority of the rest of the film despite his injury. Reeves later clarified on an episode of The Late Show with Stephen Colbert that he fell while he was shuffling quickly out of a cold plunge, and that he "spiked" his knee on the ground after catching his foot, cracking his patella "like a potato chip", drawing a lot of blood.

The majority of filming wrapped by the time that Reeves's subsequent project Outcome (2026) began principal photography on March 20, with Ansari noting specifically that scenes for a salsa dancing sequence with Reeves were left to shoot, among the reshoots that Reeves filmed once he was out of his cast. Reeves had wanted to shoot the scenes anyway, but Ansari and the rest of the production insisted on a delay until the actor's knee healed. Daniel Haworth served as editor.

=== Music ===
Carter Burwell was hired to compose the score by August 2024.

== Marketing ==
Aziz Ansari attended the 2024 CinemaCon to promote the film for Lionsgate Films, revealing his creative processes and plot details for the project, and showed attendees a closed-doors look at a trailer for the film. /Film's Ryan Scott likened the body-swapping element showcased to "Trading Places (1983) by way of Scrooged (1988)". Writing for Deadline Hollywood, Anthony D'Alessandro and Nancy Tartaglione observed, "It looks hysterical and received a ton of laughs". With the release of the first trailer in late May 2025, Empire and Gizmodo drew parallels to the premise of Reeves playing an angel with his amiable public image, and The A.V. Club wrote that a film titled "Good Fortune" was ironic due to the Murray scandal and strikes befalling Ansari's eventual directorial debut.

== Release ==
Good Fortune was released theatrically by Lionsgate Films in the United States on October 17, 2025. It premiered at the Toronto International Film Festival on September 6, 2025.

The film was released on digital VOD on November 7, 2025, and on DVD, Blu-ray, and 4K UHD on December 7.

== Reception ==
=== Box office ===
In the United States and Canada, Good Fortune was released to 2,990 theaters during its opening weekend. It opened at No. 3, its first of three consecutive weeks in the Top 10 at the domestic box office. As of December 2025, it has grossed $16.5 million in the United States and Canada along with $9.5 million from other territories, generating a worldwide total exceeding $26 million, against a budget of $30 million.

=== Critical response ===
On the review aggregator website Rotten Tomatoes, 79% of 150 critics' reviews are positive, with an average rating of 6.5/10. The website's consensus reads: "A promising directorial feature debut by Aziz Ansari, Good Fortune's socially minded humor is given wings by Keanu Reeves' heavenly comedic timing." Metacritic, which uses a weighted average, assigned the film a score of 61 out of 100, based on 38 critics, indicating "generally favorable" reviews. Audiences polled by CinemaScore gave the film an average grade of "B+" on an A+ to F scale.

For Deadline Hollywood, Pete Hammond writes that the film "captures the highest and lowest economies of Los Angeles" while discussing the gig economy and "delivering laughs."

=== Accolades ===
Keanu Reeves received a nomination for Best Supporting Actor – Comedy or Musical at the 9th Astra Film Awards. The film was nominated for Best Marketing Campaign at the 4th Astra Creative Arts Awards.

== See also ==
- List of films about angels
