= Being Mortal (film) =

Unfinished American film by Aziz Ansari

- Directed by: Aziz Ansari
- Screenplay by: Aziz Ansari
- Based on: Being Mortal by Atul Gawande
- Produced by: Aziz Ansari; Youree Henley
- Starring: Bill Murray; Seth Rogen; Aziz Ansari; Keke Palmer
- Production company: Oh Brudder Productions
- Country: United States
- Language: English

Being Mortal is an aborted American comedy-drama film written, directed, produced by, and co-starring Aziz Ansari in what was set to be his feature directorial debut. It is based on the 2014 non-fiction book of the same name by Atul Gawande. Bill Murray, Seth Rogen, and Keke Palmer were also set to co-star.

Filming began in March 2022. In April, production was suspended due to a complaint against Murray for allegedly sexually harassing a young female crew member.

== Cast ==
- Bill Murray
- Seth Rogen
- Aziz Ansari
- Keke Palmer
- Helen Slayton-Hughes

== Production ==
On February 22, 2022, Searchlight Pictures announced the development of an untitled film written, directed, and produced by Aziz Ansari in his feature directorial debut, with Ansari and Bill Murray attached to star. Taylor Friedman and Cameron Chidsey oversaw the film for Searchlight. Youree Henley was also a producer. In March, the title was revealed to be Being Mortal, the same as the material it is based on. In the following months, Seth Rogen and Keke Palmer joined the cast.

=== Suspension ===
After principal photography began on March 28, 2022, Searchlight halted production on April 18 and officially suspended production on April 20 after investigating a complaint filed against Murray for "inappropriate behavior" a week prior. In a letter to the cast and crew, Searchlight said they were working with Ansari and Henley to resolve the matter and resume production.

On April 30, Murray made a similar statement: "I did something I thought was funny, and it wasn't taken that way. The company, the movie studio, wanted to do the right thing, so they wanted to check it all out, investigate it, and so they stopped the production. But as of now, we're talking and we're trying to make peace with each other." In October of that year, reports emerged that Murray had allegedly straddled a "much younger" female production assistant and while both masked, kissed her on the mouth, causing her to file an official complaint.

Shortly afterward, Palmer mentioned that the film would need "a major rewrite" to be completed without Murray, but that "if somebody could figure it out, it's Aziz".

=== Aftermath ===
The filmmakers sought to find a financier and distributor to replace Searchlight to no avail. Ansari moved on to develop another film, Good Fortune, retaining both Rogen and Palmer in the cast; he reportedly intends to revisit Being Mortal after working on the former.

In 2025, Ansari shared that 50% of the film had been shot and that Rogen played the son of Murray's dying protagonist with Palmer playing Rogen's wife. Ansari also revealed that Helen Slayton-Hughes had shot a small part in the film as a nursing home resident; he also said talks were on-going about finishing the film but were dependent on scheduling.
