= Maria Jimenez Henley =

- Born: Maria Louisa Jimenez; February 25, 1941; Orange County, California, U.S.
- Occupations: Dancer, stage manager, assistant director
- Years active: 1961–present
- Known for: West Side Story (1961); Directors Guild of America leadership
- Spouse: Donald Caperton Henley (1935–1983)
- Children: Youree Henley; Raphael Jordan Henley
- Awards: Franklin J. Schaffner Achievement Award (2010)

Maria Jimenez Henley (born Maria Louisa Jimenez; February 25, 1941) is an American dancer, stage manager, and assistant director. She began her career as a dancer in the 1961 musical film West Side Story and later became a prominent stage manager in American television. Henley is also known for her long service and leadership within the Directors Guild of America (DGA), including as chair of its Assistant Directors/Stage Managers/Production Assistants (AD/SM/PA) Council. In 2010, she received the Franklin J. Schaffner Achievement Award for her contributions to the industry and the Guild.

== Early life ==
Henley was born Maria Louisa Jimenez on February 25, 1941, in Orange County, California. In a video interview hosted by the Academy of Motion Picture Arts and Sciences, she stated that she grew up in Temple City, California, and attended Rosemead High School.

== Dance and film career ==
Henley was selected in early 1960 to appear as Teresita, one of the Shark girlfriends, in the film adaptation of West Side Story (1961). Film scholar Ernesto R. Acevedo-Muñoz documents that Jimenez was among the dancers tested and approved for the role during formal casting sessions in Hollywood, and that she had been under consideration since January 1960. Richard Barrios identifies Jimenez as one of four Shark girlfriends of Hispanic descent featured in the final film, alongside Yvonne Othon, Linda Dangcil, and Olivia Perez, although in the original cast list she was uncredited.

Following the film's release, Henley continued working as a professional dancer. She appeared in additional film musicals including Thoroughly Modern Millie (1967) and Bedknobs and Broomsticks (1971). During the 1960s, she also worked in television variety programming, including dance work associated with the music series Shindig!, where she gained experience in multi-camera production techniques.

== Transition to stage management ==
After taking time away from the entertainment industry to raise her family, Henley returned to professional work following the death of her husband in 1983. She joined the Directors Guild of America and began working as a stage manager and assistant director on American television.

She became an in-demand stage manager on multi-camera sitcoms, including Saved by the Bell, Night Court, Growing Pains, Evening Shade, Wings, California Dreams, USA High, One World, and The Homecourt.

== Directors Guild of America service ==
In addition to her professional work, Henley became deeply involved in Guild service. She served multiple terms on the Directors Guild of America's AD/SM/PA Council, an elected body representing DGA members working as assistant directors, stage managers, and production assistants. Her service included two years as Council Chair.

Henley was also elected to three terms as co-chair of the DGA Latino Committee, co-chaired subcommittees for the DGA Student Film Awards and mentor outreach programs, and served as a second alternate on the DGA National Board from 2005 to 2007.

== Awards ==
In 2010, Henley was named the 21st recipient of the Franklin J. Schaffner Achievement Award, presented annually by the Directors Guild of America to an associate director or stage manager in recognition of outstanding service to the Guild and the profession.

== Personal life ==
Henley married Donald Caperton Henley (1935–1983), a theatrical arts manager, in Los Angeles, California, on September 26, 1964. The couple had two sons, Youree Henley, a film producer and Raphael Jordan Henley. Following her husband's death, Henley raised her children as a single parent while continuing her career in television production.

== Selected filmography ==
- West Side Story (1961) – Teresita
- Thoroughly Modern Millie (1967) – dancer
- Bedknobs and Broomsticks (1971) – dancer
