= Sandrine Rudaz =

- Genres: Film Score
- Occupation: Composer
- Website: sandrinerudaz.com

Sandrine Rudaz is a Swiss-French film music composer based in California, USA. She was born in Switzerland, where she started her classical music education at the age of three.

Rudaz has won the Hollywood Music in Media Award twice (2019 and 2022) and was nominated for a Jerry Goldsmith Award in 2019. In the same year she was named personality of the month by the Swiss newspaper Le Nouvelliste. In 2020, she was one of Le Temps' 100 personalities of the year.

== Life and career ==
Rudaz holds a Master of Music in Film Composition from the Pacific Northwest Film Scoring Program and a Bachelor of Arts in Music from the Lausanne Conservatory, Switzerland. She furthered her studies in orchestration at Stanford University.

Rudaz has composed music for over forty films. Her best-known films include the feature film "Fate of the Night" and the documentary "PARADiCE" (Hollywood Music in Media Award 2022). She has also composed for short films such as "Kneeling Sheep" and "A for Alpha" (HBO), which won Best Original Score at the Garden State Film Festival.

She has attended prestigious workshops with composers such as John Swihart ("How I Met Your Mother") and participated in the LA Film Conducting Intensive with orchestrators William Ross ("Star Wars", "Titanic") and Conrad Pope ("The Hobbit", "Jurassic Park").

As a pianist, Rudaz released her debut album "Papillon" in 2019.

Rudaz is also an ambassador for the Primetime Network and a member of organizations such as the Alliance for Women Film Composers, Society of Composers and Lyricists and Women In Film.

== Filmography (Selection) ==
- The Shell (2020)
- Aylesbury Estate (2020)
- Fate of the Night (2022)
- PARADiCE: la procession des glaciers (2023)
