= Étoile (TV series) =

2025 American comedy-drama television series

- Genre: Comedy-drama; Workplace comedy
- Created by: Amy Sherman-Palladino & Daniel Palladino
- Written by: Amy Sherman-Palladino; Daniel Palladino; Jen Kirkman; Isaac Oliver; Thomas Ward
- Directed by: Amy Sherman-Palladino; Daniel Palladino; Scott Ellis
- Starring: Luke Kirby; Charlotte Gainsbourg; Lou de Laâge; Gideon Glick; David Alvarez; Ivan du Pontavice; Taïs Vinolo; David Haig; LaMay Zhang; Simon Callow
- Theme music composer: Loral Raphael & Ronnel Raphael
- Opening theme: "Nights Are for Love" by Sons of Raphael
- Ending theme: "At Dawn I Look For You" by Sons of Raphael
- Country of origin: United States
- Original languages: English; French
- No. of seasons: 1
- No. of episodes: 8

Production
- Executive producers: Dhana Rivera Gilbert; Daniel Palladino; Amy Sherman-Palladino; Scott Ellis
- Producers: Nick Thomason; Sal Carino; Marguerite Derricks; Cindy Tolan; Raphäel Benoliel; Jen Kirkman; Isaac Oliver; Liviya Kraemer
- Cinematography: M. David Mullen; Alex Nepomniaschy
- Editors: Tim Streeto; Zana Bochar
- Running time: 52–75 minutes
- Production companies: Dorothy Parker Drank Here Productions; Big Indie Pictures; Amazon MGM Studios

Original release
- Network: Amazon Prime Video
- Release: April 24, 2025

Étoile is an American comedy-drama television series created by Amy Sherman-Palladino and Daniel Palladino. It stars Luke Kirby, Charlotte Gainsbourg, Lou de Laâge, Gideon Glick, David Alvarez, Ivan du Pontavice, Taïs Vinolo, David Haig, LaMay Zhang, and Simon Callow. The series premiered on Amazon Prime Video on April 24, 2025. Although two seasons were ordered before the premiere of the series, it was canceled after its first season in June 2025.

== Premise ==
In an attempt to save their institutions, two ballet companies, one in New York City and one in Paris, swap their danseur/danseuse étoile, the highest rank a dancer can reach at the Paris Opera Ballet.

== Cast and characters ==
=== Main ===
- Luke Kirby as Jack McMillan, the artistic director of the New York Metropolitan Ballet and the great grandson of a deceased prima ballerina, Dorothy Fish
- Charlotte Gainsbourg as Geneviève Lavigne, the interim artistic director of Le Ballet National in Paris
- Lou de Laâge as Cheyenne Toussaint, a French principal ballerina swapped to New York and a fervent environmental activist with an intense attitude
  - Constance Devernay serves as a dance double for Laâge.
- Gideon Glick as Tobias Bell, an American choreographer swapped to Paris and known to alienate himself from others due to his bizarre behavior. He is known for choreographing experimental and more modern pieces. He is often wearing headphones with death metal music blaring.
- David Alvarez as Gael Rodriguez, Cheyenne's dance partner and former corps de ballet member who was brought back to the Metropolitan Ballet at her behest. Gael and Jack do not see eye-to-eye after Gael sabotaged the marriage of Jack's sister.
- Ivan du Pontavice as Gabin Roux, a French dancer for Le Ballet National, performing Tobias's choreography and known to be a liability due to his tendencies to get into conflicts
  - Arcadian Broad serves as a dance double for du Pontavice.
- Taïs Vinolo as Mishi Duplessis, a French ballerina dancing in America, swapped back to Paris. She preferred to stay in New York after being cut in Paris by Lavigne and to avoid her parents, especially since her mother is a major French government figure.
- David Haig as Nicholas Leutwylek, an old-school former dancer who is disturbed by the rise of technology and social media. He wants to retire due to his series of health scares and a diminishing cultural appreciation for ballet, but Jack convinces him to continue training young dancers, believing him to be irreplaceable.
- LaMay Zhang as SuSu Li, a young Chinese-American aspiring ballerina whose mother is the cleaning lady for the Metropolitan. Her mother cannot afford dance lessons and films the classes and rehearsals for Susu to practice in the MBT studio after hours. Cheyenne urges Jack to have Susu enrolled free of charge due to her potential.
- Simon Callow as Crispin Shamblee, a wealthy British oil baron who is the benefactor for both ballet companies. He is fond of ballet as he attends rehearsals and argues with Cheyenne over her activist ways, especially when she slanders Crispin and vandalizes his tankers. Jack, however, has his own reasons for despising him.

=== Recurring ===
- Yanic Truesdale as Raphaël Marchand, a trainer at Le Ballet National working directly under Lavigne
- Marie Berto as Bruna Toussaint, Cheyenne's mother whom Mishi is residing with in Paris to avoid her parents
- Unity Phelan as Julie, a star ballerina for the Metropolitan ballet who suffered an injury on social media and Cheyenne took her place
- Christine Chang as Fei, Susu's mother who is the night cleaning lady. She brings her daughter to work and films the classes and rehearsals for her daughter who uses them to practice in MBT's studio. She fears of getting fired after Jack finds out but changes her tune after Cheyenne vouches for Susu.
- Joy Womack as Tasha Schaeffer, a Russian ballerina at Le Ballet National
- Tiler Peck as Eva Cullman, a ballerina at the Metropolitan Ballet. She is accompanied by a therapist following a mishap from freezing up during a performance of Swan Lake.
- Isabelle Candelier as Clea Duplessis, French Minister of Culture and Mishi's mother. Mishi wants to avoid her, knowing the influence she has on Le Ballet National.
- Yannig Samot as Florent Duplessis, Mishi's father
- Allister Madin as Matthieu Rivière, a highly skilled French dancer at Le Ballet National who has an ongoing rivalry with Gabin
- Patrick Page as John Fish, Jack's uncle
- Kelly Bishop as Clara Fish-McMillan, Jack's mother
- Constance Devernay as Melanie Dubois, a French ballerina at Le Ballet National. Devernay also serves as a dance double for de Laâge.
- Tristan Ridel as Tristan Magan, a French dancer at Le Ballet National who was made Mishi's dance partner. He was also shown to be Mishi's real friend while the rest of the Ballet Corp wanted her out.
- Robbie Fairchild as Larry O'Connell, a principal dancer at the Metropolitan Ballet who was originally assigned to be Cheyenne's dance partner, but Cheyenne refused him
- Axel Gallois as Alain Michel, a choreographer for Le Ballet National
- Nina Arianda as Quinn McMillan, Jack's sister who is a music conductor
- Ambrose Martos as Dr. Speer, Eva Cullman's personal therapist

=== Guest ===
- Didi Conn as Diane, MBT archivist
- David Byrne as himself
- Jonathan Groff as Kevin, Tobias's ex-boyfriend
- Sparks as themselves
- Isaac Mizrahi as himself
- Bob Dishy as Grandpa Charles Fish
- Connor Ratliff as Morton
- Alexander Gemignani as Sander

== Episodes ==
No.	Title	Directed by	Written by	Original release date
1	"The Swap"	Amy Sherman-Palladino	Daniel Palladino and Amy Sherman-Palladino	April 24, 2025
2	"The Bull"	Daniel Palladino	Amy Sherman-Palladino and Daniel Palladino	April 24, 2025
3	"The Fish"	Daniel Palladino	Amy Sherman-Palladino and Daniel Palladino	April 24, 2025
4	"The Hiccup"	Amy Sherman-Palladino	Daniel Palladino and Amy Sherman-Palladino	April 24, 2025
5	"The Rat"	Scott Ellis	Jen Kirkman and Isaac Oliver	April 24, 2025
6	"The Disaster"	Scott Ellis	Thomas Ward	April 24, 2025
7	"The Slip"	Daniel Palladino	Daniel Palladino	April 24, 2025
8	"The Offer"	Amy Sherman-Palladino	Amy Sherman-Palladino	April 24, 2025

== Production ==
In October 2022, Amy Sherman-Palladino and Daniel Palladino held an open casting call for an untitled ballet show as the follow-up to their comedy The Marvelous Mrs. Maisel. The duo previously explored the subject of ballet with their series Bunheads, and their series Gilmore Girls included a ballet teacher among its supporting characters. Étoile is executive produced by Amy Sherman-Palladino, Daniel Palladino, and Dhana Rivera Gilbert, with Scott Ellis serving as co-executive producer. The series is partially inspired by Frederick Wiseman ballet-themed documentaries such as La Danse. It was filmed in New York and Paris. The show switches between English and French; the scripts were originally written in English and then translated for the French scenes. Sherman-Palladino commented on the difficulty in finding the right translator and that they kept switching until they "found Dany Héricourt". She explained they had to find "the right translator who could make the dialogue work rhythmically with what we needed it to work with. [They had to] make it make sense and retain the humor if you're listening to it in French".

=== Casting ===
On April 26, 2023, it was reported that the new series, Étoile, had been given a two-season order from Amazon Prime Video, and that it would star Luke Kirby and Gideon Glick (both worked previously with Sherman-Palladino and Palladino on The Marvelous Mrs. Maisel), as well as Camille Cottin, Simon Callow, Lou de Laâge, and David Alvarez. Charlotte Gainsbourg later replaced Cottin, who dropped out over scheduling conflicts.

On November 26, 2024, it was reported that David Haig had been added to the cast as a regular. On December 5, 2024, it was reported that Ivan du Pontavice and Taïs Vinolo had been added to the cast. Du Pontavice is the son of Xilam CEO and producer, Marc du Pontavice and director and Xilam administrator, Alix de Maistre. Yanic Truesdale and Kelly Bishop, who both worked with Sherman-Palladino on Gilmore Girls, would have recurring roles. Several featured performers and all of the background dancers were selected from within the ballet community. Pointe highlighted that the Palladinos, with choreographer and producer Marguerite Derricks, "pulled from top European and American troupes to create two fictional companies of about 20 dancers each". Neither Laâge or Pontavice are dancers so Constance Devernay and Arcadian Broad, respectively, were cast as their dance doubles. Derricks and Sherman-Palladino commented on not hiding the use of dance doubles as they instead wanted to take the approach of celebrating the artistry of the show's dancers.

== Release ==
In 2023 it was reported that Étoile received a "two-season straight-to-series order" by Amazon Studios. The official trailer was released on March 26, 2025. All eight episodes of the first season were released on Amazon Prime Video on April 24, 2025. Following the release of the first season, the series was canceled in June 2025. The Hollywood Reporter commented that while Étoile was ordered with two seasons, "such deals often have contingencies" that allow "a streamer or network" to "opt out after part of a multi-season order".

== Reception ==
On the review aggregator website Rotten Tomatoes, Étoile has an approval rating of 85% based on 46 reviews, with a critics consensus of: "An affectionate ode to the beauty of ballet and the difficult personalities behind it, Étoile isn't as tonally nimble as previous Sherman-Palladino series but packs plenty of the same charms." Metacritic, which uses a weighted average, gave the series a score of 69 out of 100, based on 20 critics, indicating "generally favorable" reviews.

Judy Berman, for Time, wrote "Étoile has all the elements of a classic Sherman-Palladino joint, which is to say that it's a pleasure to watch". Berman highlighted that "the dialogue is punchy", "cultural references abound" and it has "familiar faces from the Sherman-Palladino sphere". Robert Lloyd of the Los Angeles Times commented that the "plots and subplots and miniplots involving dancers and assistants, technicians and politicians, are not all equally rewarding [...] but together they create an attractive tapestry". Berman commented "there's no question that the show is overstuffed. With such a big cast and so many storylines, it's easy to lose track of characters". Christina Izzo of The A.V. Club stated that the show lacks "urgency" and "it takes a good half season to really get grooving". Daniel Fienberg, for The Hollywood Reporter, thought the show's initial episodes were "likably light-on-its-feet, infused with its creators' love and admiration for this world and boasting strong lead performances from Luke Kirby and Charlotte Gainsbourg as well as a knockout English-language debut from co-star Lou de Laâge". However, Fienberg viewed the later episodes as having a "downward spiral", noting that "some of the things that happen in the Étoile homestretch are so pointlessly dumb they soured me on a show that I'd mostly been enjoying". Aramide Tinubu of Variety wrote "while the dancing is stunning, and some characters have a few amusing traits, Étoile is an exhausting show centering a slew of insufferable people obsessed with hearing themselves speak" and that it "never reaches such heights" as Gilmore Girls and The Marvelous Mrs. Maisel.

Lloyd highlighted the "intensity" of de Laâge's Cheyenne is "often indistinguishable from rage" and "can border on the comic" but she "delivers an all-in, all-out performance; she sits and stands and walks like a dancer (though she also has a double for the dances) and makes you believe she's who the show says she is". Jen Maravegias of Pajiba commented that "the stars of Étoile's dance companies are French standouts performing archetypal roles" with de Laâge as the show's "pièce de résistance" and "an absolute delight to watch". Izzo highlighted that "both Gainsbourg and Kirby are captivating leads" and the use of "real-deal talents" brings "legitimacy to the dramedy's frequent dance numbers, which are overseen by choreographer Marguerite Derricks. [...] However, some of the more dance-focused cast members fail to pop against their fellow actors". Jackson McHenry of Vulture praised Gainsbourg's performance, noting her "propulsive yet scatterbrained" energy as reminiscent of Lorelai Gilmore and highlighted the chemistry between Gainsbourg's Geneviève and Kirby's "smoldering" Jack. McHenry also commented that while the "quirks" of Glick's Tobias "can be implausibly strained", the character finds emotional depth in a "sweet and charged" queer romance with du Pontavice's Gabin. Tinubu stated "the few enjoyable figures in Étoile remain on the fringes", such as Vinolo's Mishi and Glick's Tobias who she thought were "captivating". Tinubu opined that Tobias "is one of the series' only genuine delights" while "Geneviève and Cheyenne are such grating personalities that the entire series feels clunky, as if the audience is being held hostage in this world instead of welcomed into it".

Izzo also noted that as a Palladino production "everything is heightened" and "the dialogue is, as always, quicker than a chaîné turn; the takes are long and lush [...]; and the settings and costuming are unsurprisingly sumptuous, especially in Paris". Lloyd thought "the combination of theatrical speech and location shooting – in and around New York's Lincoln Center and the Palais Garnier and Salle Favart in Paris – makes for something interesting" and it was "artificial in a way that paradoxically allows for something real and relatable". Maravegias highlighted that "Sherman-Palladino excels at building worlds out of dialogue and scenery we want to immerse ourselves in" with the "insular world of professional ballet" becoming a character itself – "the spectacle and artistry of the performances she chose to include in the series are remarkable". McHenry viewed the show's "central love story" as the one "between all these characters and dance. That may sound corny, but Sherman-Palladino so clearly loves the art form that the characters' dedication to it becomes the anchor of the show's emotions". Fienberg commented that the show is "selective" on "how much dance it actually shows" and relies on the audience taking "the dialogue at its word that certain performances are exceptional or certain creative forces are brilliant"; on the use of dance doubles, he noted that casuals viewers "probably won't notice who actually is doing their own dancing and when (attentive viewers surely will)". Fienberg highlighted that "the dance sequences are generally simply shot, lots of full-body and full-stage framings, very few sweaty close-ups [...]. Everything is photographed with a handsome fluidity; it's the rare series that gives the Steadicam operator a prominent position in the credits".

=== Accolades ===
Year	Award	Category	Nominee(s)	Result	Ref.
2025	Primetime Emmy Awards	Outstanding Choreography for Scripted Programming	Marguerite Derricks	Won	
2025	Primetime Emmy Awards	Outstanding Cinematography for a Series (One Hour)	M. David Mullen (for "The Swap")	Nominated	
