= Loral Raphael =

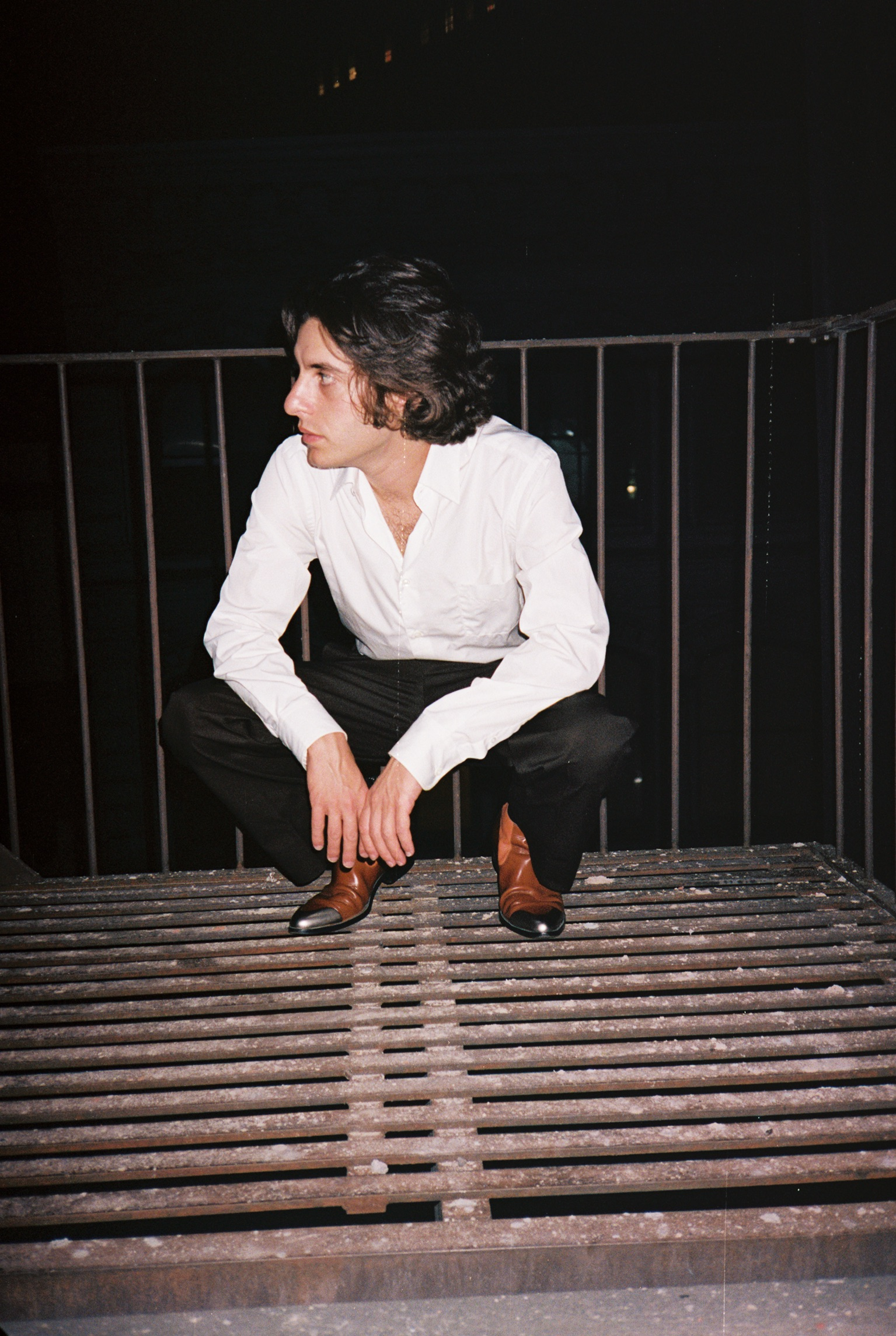
Loral Raphael

Loral Raphael is a London-born multidisciplinary artist whose work spans music and visual art. He studied at King’s College London before beginning his career in music alongside his brother, Ronnel Raphael, with whom he produces music under Sons of Raphael. The brothers released their critically acclaimed debut record Full-Throated Messianic Homage in 2021. Raphael has also composed for film and television, including writing the original music to Sofia Coppola's A24 film Priscilla (film), and as of 2025 released music in collaboration with Thomas Bangalter of Daft Punk.

In November 2025 his first solo exhibition, 'We prayed and prayed and nobody listened', opened at Polina Berlin Gallery in New York.
