= Youree Henley =

American film producer

- Born: United States
- Occupation: Film producer
- Notable work: The Lighthouse

Youree Henley is a film producer. On two projects (20th Century Women in 2016 and Kajillionaire in 2020), he has been affiliated with Annapurna Pictures.

== Early life ==
Youree Henley was born on 3 January 1971 in Los Angeles County, California. He is the elder son of dancer and stage manager Maria Jimenez Henley and theatrical arts manager Donald Caperton Henley (1935–1983).

Following his father’s death in 1983, Henley was raised by his mother, who continued her career in television production while serving in leadership roles within the Directors Guild of America.

== Selected filmography ==
- A Glimpse Inside the Mind of Charles Swan III (2012)
- Len and Company (2015)
- 20th Century Women (2016)
- The Beguiled (2017)
- A Beautiful Day in the Neighborhood (2019)
- The Lighthouse (2019)
- Kajillionaire (2020)
- On the Rocks (2020)
- Operation Varsity Blues: The College Admissions Scandal (2021)
- Priscilla (2023)
- A Big Bold Beautiful Journey (2025)
- Marc by Sofia (2025)
- Making Marie Antoinette (2026)

He has also been co-producing the suspended film project and uncompleted film Being Mortal (starring Aziz Ansari, who has also been co-producing).
