= The Virgin Suicides (soundtrack) =

Soundtrack album by Various artists
- Released: 28 March 2000
- Genre: Pop; rock; ambient
- Length: 53:53
- Label: Emperor Norton
- Compiler: Brian Reitzell; Sofia Coppola

The Virgin Suicides (Music from the Motion Picture) is the soundtrack accompanying the 1999 debut feature film by director Sofia Coppola. Released by Emperor Norton Records on March 28, 2000, the album features classic rock and pop songs by Todd Rundgren, Heart, Sloan, The Hollies, Al Green, Gilbert O'Sullivan, 10cc and Styx; plus two tracks from the French electronic music duo Air.

== Background ==
Sofia Coppola wanted the film's soundtrack to convey the feeling of adolescence in the suburbs, a theme to be reflected in the songs chosen from the time the film is set: 1975. Not wanting to rely only on hits from the early 1970s, she opted to combine songs of the period with a "consistently other-worldly soundtrack" in the score by Air, a band she had listened to while writing the screenplay. (The score Air composed for The Virgin Suicides was released as a separate album on February 23, 2000; the band would also go on to collaborate with the filmmaker on some of her subsequent projects.)

Coppola opined that this soundtrack, despite being filled with 1970s music, also had a modern feel. There is a song by the Canadian band Sloan, who formed in 1991; and two selections from Air, including "Playground Love (Vibraphone Version)", a new recording made especially for the soundtrack. She also found that she shared many of her suburban memories and experiences with Air's Nicolas Godin and Jean-Benoît Dunckel, even though they grew up in a different country.

Brian Reitzell, the film's music consultant (and a former member of Redd Kross), said he wanted to select songs "that were not the songs that everyone thinks of at first, but ones that are a little more obscure. It was important to strike that intimate chord that transports you back to that period. But we also didn't want to be obvious with our choices. We didn't pick any stoner rock for the film, which is what everyone seems to be doing."

== Critical reception ==
Professional ratings
Review scores
Source	Rating
AllMusic	3/5 stars
NME	7.5/10
Pitchfork	4.8/10

The soundtrack received positive reviews from critics. AllMusic contributor Gina Boldman wrote: "The soundtrack replays the myriad emotions of adolescence and those of the Lisbon girls in particular." Pitchfork's Mark Richardson gave context to the album's focus on the '70s in his review: "This soundtrack seeks to replicate the feel of mainstream mid-'70s radio, and to that end, it's a wild success. This is what it sounded like — from the banal pop of 10cc to the raw (okay, medium-rare) power of Heart to the epic romanticism of Styx. Forget disco, CBGB's, punk, and new wave. That stuff didn't play in Peoria until much later. For a real taste of what a suburban kid playing Space Invaders was likely to hear pumping over the arcade sound system, this collection is the real thing. The problem is, no one ever said mainstream '70s radio was particularly good. It was like the mainstream radio of any other time, with a few true innovators, a glut of imitators, and a handful of the truly awful. All are represented here in their proper proportions."

In his 2021 article on music and gender in Coppola's film for Our Culture Mag, Konstantinos Pappis wrote that "what’s certain is that the role of music is more than just affective or nostalgic; it inhabits a complex and often gendered perspective that may either reinforce or offer an alternative to and an escape from the gaze."

Clare Nina Norelli of Mubi.com gave a comparative analysis of the film's incorporated music and its score: "Within the film, rock and pop songs tether the narrative to the material world both diegetically and non-diegetically, connecting the boys to the Lisbon sisters and locating the action firmly within the film’s mid-1970s setting through its contemporaneous music choices [...] We hear these songs when the sisters give a small party at their home, attend their school dance, and when they engage in a moving telephone exchange with the boys that involves playing records to each other in order to express the inexpressible, allowing the music to speak where they cannot." She further described Air's work as "metaphysical, aligned with the heavens" and added: "Through its spacious, soaring, almost hymnal synth harmonies, pulsating rhythms, and bittersweet melodies, their score conveys musically the translucence of memory and invests the ethereal specters of the Lisbon sisters on screen with an added otherworldliness."

== Track listing ==
No.	Title	Writer(s)	Artist	Length
1.	"Magic Man"	Ann Wilson, Nancy Wilson	Heart	5:28
2.	"Hello It's Me"	Todd Rundgren	Todd Rundgren	4:21
3.	"Everything You've Done Wrong"	Sloan	Sloan	3:27
4.	"Ce Matin Là"	Air, Patrick Woodcock	Air	3:39
5.	"The Air That I Breathe"	Albert Hammond, Mike Hazlewood	The Hollies	3:47
6.	"How Can You Mend a Broken Heart"	Barry Gibb, Robin Gibb	Al Green	6:23
7.	"Alone Again (Naturally)"	Gilbert O'Sullivan	Gilbert O'Sullivan	3:39
8.	"Strange Magic"	Jeff Lynne	Electric Light Orchestra	4:29
9.	"I'm Not in Love"	Eric Stewart, Graham Gouldman	10cc	6:04
10.	"A Dream Goes On Forever"	Todd Rundgren	Todd Rundgren	2:23
11.	"Crazy on You"	Ann Wilson, Nancy Wilson	Heart	4:55
12.	"Playground Love" (Vibraphone version)	Air, Thomas Mars	Air	3:51
13.	"Come Sail Away"	Dennis DeYoung	Styx	6:04
14.	"Hello It's Me"	Todd Rundgren	Todd Rundgren	3:57
15.	"So Far Away"	Carole King	Carole King	3:55

== Personnel ==
Credits taken from The Virgin Suicides liner notes.

- Sofia Coppola – cover art, liner notes
- Corinne Day – photography
- Dan Hersh – mastering
- Bill Inglot – mastering
- George McFetridge – design
- Jill Meyers – music business affairs
- Brian Reitzell – music supervisor

== Chart performance ==
Chart (2000–2001)	Peak position
Australian Albums (ARIA)	100
European Albums (Music & Media)	78
German Albums (Offizielle Top 100)	35
Scottish Albums (OCC)	29
Swiss Albums (Schweizer Hitparade)	20
UK Albums (OCC)	55
US Billboard 200	138

Chart (2023)	Peak position
Hungarian Physical Albums (MAHASZ)	30

== Release history ==
Region	Date	Label
Japan	15 March 2000	L'Appareil-Photo Bis; V2
Germany	17 March 2000	Emperor Norton; Rykodisc
France	27 March 2000	Emperor Norton; Rykodisc
United Kingdom	27 March 2000	Emperor Norton; Rykodisc
United States	28 March 2000	Emperor Norton
United States	24 October 2020 (reissue*)	Rhino Records

(*further US/UK vinyl reissues followed in 2023-24)
