= Priscilla (film) =

2023 American film by Sofia Coppola

- Theatrical release poster
- Directed by: Sofia Coppola
- Written by: Sofia Coppola
- Based on: Elvis and Me by: Priscilla Presley; Sandra Harmon
- Produced by: Sofia Coppola; Youree Henley; Lorenzo Mieli
- Starring: Cailee Spaeny; Jacob Elordi; Dagmara Domińczyk
- Cinematography: Philippe Le Sourd
- Edited by: Sarah Flack
- Music by: Phoenix (score); Sons of Raphael (original music)
- Production companies: Fremantle; American Zoetrope; The Apartment Pictures
- Distributed by: A24
- Release dates: September 4, 2023 (Venice); November 3, 2023 (United States)
- Running time: 114 minutes
- Country: United States
- Language: English
- Budget: $20 million
- Box office: $33.1 million

Priscilla is a 2023 American biographical drama film written, directed, and produced by Sofia Coppola, based on the 1985 memoir Elvis and Me by Priscilla Presley (who serves as an executive producer) and Sandra Harmon. It follows the life of Priscilla (Cailee Spaeny) and her complicated romantic relationship with Elvis Presley (Jacob Elordi).

Priscilla premiered at the 80th Venice International Film Festival on September 4, 2023, where Spaeny won the Volpi Cup for Best Actress. It was released in the United States by A24 in select theaters on October 27, 2023, before expanding wide on November 3, 2023. It received positive reviews from critics and grossed $33 million worldwide. In addition to her award from Venice, Spaeny received a Best Actress nomination at the Golden Globe Awards for her performance.

== Plot ==
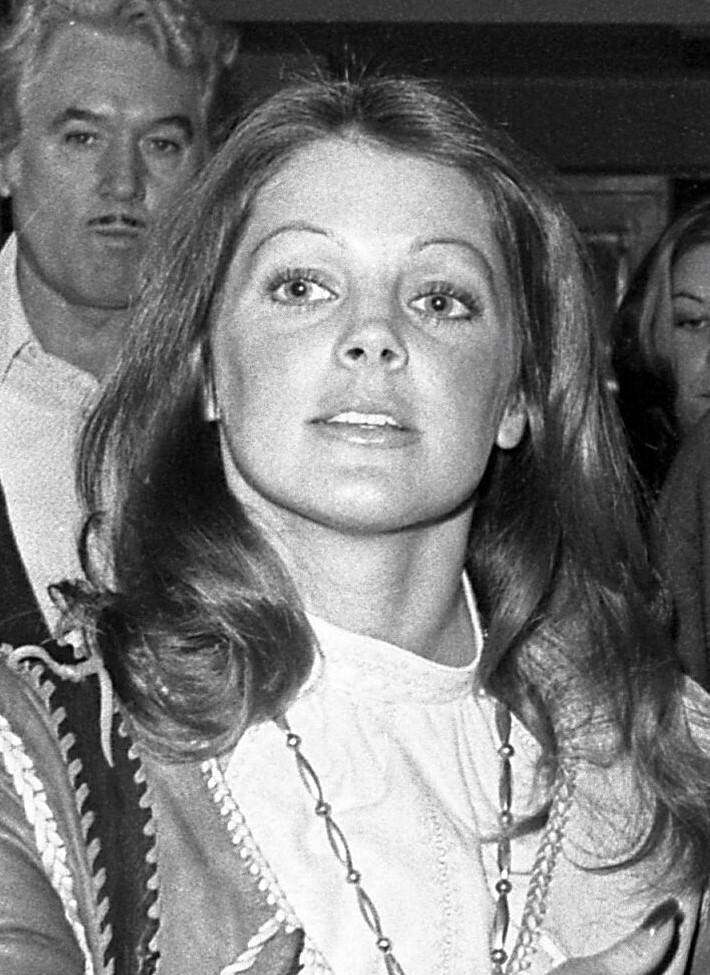
The film centers on Priscilla Beaulieu (pictured in 1973) and her relationship with Elvis Presley

Two months before 24-year-old singer Elvis Presley is discharged from the U.S. military and leaves West Germany, he meets 14-year-old Priscilla Beaulieu at a party. She resides with her parents in Bad Nauheim, where her father is also in the army. Elvis, who was drafted in 1958, at the peak of his fame, quickly shows interest in Priscilla, and they start dating casually, despite her parents' concerns about their age difference and his celebrity status. Elvis eventually returns to the U.S., losing contact with Priscilla and leaving her crestfallen.

In June 1962, they reconnect and she visits him at Graceland. Before taking her to Las Vegas, he leaves pre-written postcards for her parents, to be mailed by his assistant. They enjoy their vacation and she returns to West Germany. In 1963, professing his love, Elvis asks her parents if Priscilla can live with his father, Vernon, and stepmother, Dee, in Memphis and attend a private Catholic girls' school. Her parents agree and Priscilla moves to finish her senior year of high school.

While her time spent with Elvis is pleasant, Priscilla is lonely when he is away filming in Los Angeles, but is friendly with his paternal grandmother, Dodger, and house staff. After graduating, she visits Elvis and confronts him on the highly-publicized rumors of his alleged infidelities with co-star Ann-Margret, which he says only serve as publicity for the film Viva Las Vegas. She continues to live at Graceland until he proposes in 1966. Priscilla witnesses bouts of Elvis' explosive temper, followed by remorse and excuses. Over the years, Priscilla tries to entice him into sex, but he states she is too young, eventually conceding to "do other things" sexually.

In May 1967, the two marry in Las Vegas, and Priscilla quickly becomes pregnant, delighting Elvis, though she is concerned how soon they will become parents and asks Elvis about their plans for just the two of them to travel, which he says they can do later. Elvis' ongoing prescription drug abuse, physical absence and frequent affairs further cause strain on their marriage. Elvis unexpectedly suggests they momentarily separate and Priscilla, to his surprise, replies indifferently. On February 1, 1968, Priscilla gives birth to their daughter, Lisa Marie, as Elvis is preparing for his NBC 1968 comeback special. He grows increasingly distant and the two eventually begin leading separate lives.

While visiting Elvis in his hotel room after a performance in 1973, Priscilla sees him in a mild haze of drug abuse. He attempts to seduce her, aggressively. Hearing her plans for divorce, Elvis asks if she is leaving him for another man, but she says she seeks an independent life. After a visit to Graceland to say goodbye to Elvis' housekeepers and grandmother, Priscilla drives away, as a number of Elvis' fans loiter outside the property gates.

== Cast ==
- Cailee Spaeny as Priscilla Presley
- Jacob Elordi as Elvis Presley
- Ari Cohen as Paul Beaulieu, Priscilla's stepfather
- Dagmara Domińczyk as Ann Beaulieu, Priscilla's mother
- Tim Post as Vernon Presley, Elvis' father
- Lynne Griffin as Grandma "Dodger", Elvis' grandmother
- Emily Mitchell as Lisa Marie Presley, Elvis and Priscilla Presley's daughter
- Daniel Beirne as Joe Esposito
- Rodrigo Fernandez-Stoll as Alan "Hog Ears"
- Dan Abramovici as Jerry Schilling
- R. Austin Ball as Larry Geller
- Olivia Barrett as Alberta, the cook
- Stephanie Moore as Dee, Elvis' stepmother
- Luke Humphrey as Terry West
- Evan Annisette as Mike Stone

== Production ==
=== Development and casting ===
On September 12, 2022, it was announced Sofia Coppola would direct an adaptation of Priscilla Presley's memoir Elvis and Me, starring Jacob Elordi as Elvis Presley and Cailee Spaeny as Priscilla. When asked what made her want to adapt Priscilla's memoir for her next feature film, Coppola responded in an interview, "I've had her memoir for years and remember reading it a long time ago. A friend of mine was talking about her recently, and we got around to discussing the book. I read it again and was really moved by her story. I was supposed to start this big Edith Wharton project that was gonna take five months to shoot and felt really daunting. I came up against a few hurdles, so I just decided to pivot to making one film with one idea. I was just so interested in Priscilla's story and her perspective on what it all felt like to grow up as a teenager in Graceland. She was going through all the stages of young womanhood in such an amplified world—kinda similar to Marie Antoinette."

When asked what made Spaeny the right choice to play Priscilla, Coppola stated, "The character goes from the age of 15 to 27 over the course of the film, so she had to be able to act and age across a big span of time. It was really important for me to have the same actress playing Priscilla at those different stages of her life, and I think Cailee can pull it off. She's such a strong actress, and she also looks very young." Of Elordi's casting as Elvis, Coppola stated, "I thought nobody was gonna look quite like Elvis, but Jacob has that same type of magnetism. He's so charismatic, and girls go crazy around him, so I knew he could pull off playing this type of romantic icon. But we're talking before we've even started filming, so I can't get too deep into it."

Coppola also revealed in an interview that Priscilla Presley is an executive producer of Priscilla.

In emails exchanged with Coppola on September 2, 2022, and later obtained by Variety, Lisa Marie Presley, who died in January 2023, criticised the film's script for its portrayal of her father. In one message, she stated, "My father only comes across as a predator and manipulative. As his daughter, I don't read this and see any of my father in this character. I don't read this and see my mother's perspective of my father. I read this and see your shockingly vengeful and contemptuous perspective and I don't understand why?"

=== Filming ===
Principal photography for Priscilla began in Toronto on October 24, 2022. Filming wrapped in early December 2022.

== Music ==
Priscilla does not have Elvis Presley's music on its soundtrack. Coppola's husband, Thomas Mars, and his band, Phoenix, scored the film. Sons of Raphael wrote original music for the film.

The soundtrack features 17 of the 51 musical selections used in the film. "My Elixir", a cover song by Sons of Raphael of a track from Phoenix's 2022 studio album Alpha Zulu, was released as the lead single. The soundtrack was published under the A24 Music and ABKCO Records labels on November 2, 2023. Critics praised the anachronistic soundtrack choices as well as Phoenix's score.

== Release ==
Priscilla premiered at the 80th Venice International Film Festival on September 4, 2023. It screened as the Centerpiece Selection of the 2023 New York Film Festival on October 6 and had its Canadian premiere as a special presentation at the 42nd Vancouver International Film Festival on October 7. The film was distributed in North America by A24, and in Italy by Vision Distribution. Originally to be distributed by Stage 6 Films and Sony Pictures Releasing International outside North America and Italy, Sony later exited the project upon Presley's estate withholding music rights. Mubi later acquired these rights, with its sales company The Match Factory handling international sales; Mubi itself handled distribution in the United Kingdom, Ireland, Germany, the Benelux, Turkey and Latin America, partnering with PVR Inox Pictures for the film's Indian theatrical release.

=== Home media ===
Priscilla was released on digital platforms on December 15, 2023, followed by a Blu-ray release on February 13, 2024. The film was released on Max in the United States on February 23, 2024. It was then released on Mubi in the United Kingdom and Ireland on March 1, 2024.

== Reception ==
=== Box office ===
The film earned $132,149 from four theaters in its opening weekend, averaging around $33,034 per venue. In its second weekend, after expanding to 1,344 theaters, it grossed $5.1 million and finished fourth. The following weekend, it brought in $4.8 million from 2,361 theaters. By its fourth weekend, the film earned $2.3 million, bringing its domestic total to $16.9 million and making it Coppola's second-highest film domestically. Overall, the film grossed $21 million in the United States, operating on a budget of less than $20 million.

During its first weekend in the United Kingdom and Ireland, the film ranked sixth. It grossed £1.4 million during its first full week in theaters, including £643,800 over the weekend.

=== Critical response ===
On the review aggregator website Rotten Tomatoes, 84% of 304 critics' reviews are positive, with an average rating of 7.3/10. The website's consensus reads: "With Cailee Spaeny's performance in the title role leading the way, Priscilla sees Sofia Coppola taking a tender yet clear-eyed look at the often toxic blend created by mixing first love and fame." Metacritic, which uses a weighted average, assigned the film a score of 79 out of 100, based on 59 critics, indicating "generally favorable" reviews. Audiences polled by PostTrak gave it a 71% overall positive score, with 50% saying they would definitely recommend the film.

Positive reviews praised the casting of Spaeny and Elordi, with some commenting that the actors highlight the vast power disparity between Priscilla and Elvis. Ben Kenigsberg of The New York Times described Spaeny’s performance as "sensitive" and "protean," while Marlow Stern of Rolling Stone wrote, "Spaeny, who is 25 but makes for a convincing teenager, is an absolute marvel, nailing Priscilla's complicated mélange of emotions — the wide-eyed wonderment and youthful desire, the apprehension and fear — while Elordi’s Elvis feels more grounded in reality than Austin Butler's pouty hip-shaker." Critics also commended the film for its exploration of themes present in Coppola's previous films, such as the isolation of fame, femininity, and "privilege without power".

Stern added, "You couldn’t ask for a better person to handle this material than Coppola, who's no stranger to depicting young female protagonists and the powerful men who enjoy keeping them locked in gilded cages, whether it be the Park Hyatt Tokyo, the Chateau Marmont, the Palace of Versailles or Graceland. As the daughter of Francis Ford Coppola, she’s lived it, and is uniquely equipped to show what it's like to put a big, flawed man on a pedestal only to see that pedestal crack." Stern concluded that the film is "a transportive, heartbreaking journey into the dark heart of celebrity, and [is Coppola's] finest film since Lost in Translation".

Alison Willmore of Vulture wrote, "The marvel of Priscilla is in its dual awareness, how it’s able to immerse us in the bubble-bath-balmy perspective of a teenager experiencing an astonishing bout of wish fulfillment and, at the same time, always allow us to appreciate how disturbing what’s happening actually is." Willmore’s review noted, "Priscilla is a teenage fantasy and wouldn’t work without acknowledging the headiness of being romanced by the most famous man in the country, though it’s telling that the film feels thinner and more rushed as its main character tires of her husband’s acting out and compartmentalizing of her within his life and realizes she can push back".

In his review for The New Yorker, Anthony Lane wrote, "To point out that Priscilla is superficial, even more so than Coppola’s other films, is no derogation, because surfaces are her subject. She examines the skin of the observable world without presuming to seek the flesh beneath, and this latest work is an agglomeration of things—purchases, ornaments, and textures. We see an array of outfits, chosen by Elvis for his wife, each one lovingly accessorized with a handgun. Closeups tell the tale: bare toes, at the start, sinking deep into the nap of a carpet; false eyelashes and china knickknacks; a single pill (the first of many) that Elvis lays on Priscilla’s palm, as if it were a Communion wafer; and a mini-sphinx, gilded and ridiculous, that we glimpse as she eventually flees from Graceland. If she stays there any longer, being Mrs. Presley, she, too, will shrink into a thing."

Justin Chang of the Los Angeles Times reviewed the film positively, writing, "There is much more to Priscilla Presley's story left untold here: motherhood (Lisa Marie appears briefly here, at different ages), her own infidelity, her future romances, her friendship with Elvis until his death in 1977, her film career, The Naked Gun movies ... But with piercing matter-of-factness, Coppola ends this movie, her strongest in more than a decade, at just the right moment: when a dream finally dies, and the thrill is well and truly gone."

BBC Culture's Nicholas Barber found it an "understated, non-judgemental portrait" of Priscilla, which was in stark contrast to the tone of Baz Luhrmann's telling of Elvis' story in Elvis (2022). Commenting on Priscilla and Luhrmann's film, Lane said, "We need both movies, I would argue: last year’s frenzied act of worship and now this irreverent response, all the more potent for being so still and small."

Filmmaker Jane Campion praised the film, saying "Don't be fooled by the apparent softness of Sofia Coppola's vision or the gentle sensitivity of her gaze, it's just that Sofia plays soft to deliver tough. There is so much dare, risk and rigor in Sofia's filmmaking, so much radical trust that it scares the pants off lesser filmmakers."

== Awards and nominations ==
Award	Date of ceremony	Category	Recipient(s)	Result	Ref.
Venice Film Festival	September 9, 2023	Golden Lion	Sofia Coppola	Nominated	
Venice Film Festival	September 9, 2023	Volpi Cup for Best Actress	Cailee Spaeny	Won	
Mill Valley Film Festival	October 16, 2023	Filmmaking	Sofia Coppola	Won	
Middleburg Film Festival	October 22, 2023	Variety Collaborators Award	Sofia Coppola and Stacey Battat	Won	
Gotham Independent Film Awards	November 27, 2023	Outstanding Lead Performance	Cailee Spaeny	Nominated	
Chicago Film Critics Association	December 12, 2023	Best Costume Design	Stacey Battat	Nominated	
St. Louis Film Critics Association	December 17, 2023	Best Costume Design	Stacey Battat	Nominated	
Dublin Film Critics' Circle	December 18, 2023	Best Film	Priscilla	10th place	
North Texas Film Critics Association	December 18, 2023	Best Actress	Cailee Spaeny	Nominated	
Florida Film Critics Circle Awards	December 21, 2023	Breakout Award	Cailee Spaeny	Nominated	
Alliance of Women Film Journalists	January 3, 2024	Best Woman's Breakthrough Performance	Cailee Spaeny	Nominated	
Golden Globe Awards	January 7, 2024	Best Actress in a Motion Picture – Drama	Cailee Spaeny	Nominated	
Seattle Film Critics Society Awards	January 8, 2024	Best Costume Design	Stacey Battat	Nominated	
Critics' Choice Awards	January 14, 2024	Best Hair and Makeup	Priscilla	Nominated	
AARP Movies for Grownups Awards	January 17, 2024	Best Time Capsule	Priscilla	Nominated	
London Film Critics' Circle	February 4, 2024	Breakthrough Performer of the Year	Cailee Spaeny	Nominated	
Satellite Awards	March 3, 2024	Best Actress in Motion Picture, Comedy or Musical	Cailee Spaeny	Nominated	
People's Choice Awards	February 18, 2024	The Drama Movie Star of the Year	Jacob Elordi	Nominated	
Artios Awards	March 7, 2024	Outstanding Achievement in Casting – Feature Studio or Independent (Drama)	Nicole Daniels, Courtney Bright, John Buchan, Jason Knight	Nominated	
