= Sons of Raphael =

English rock band

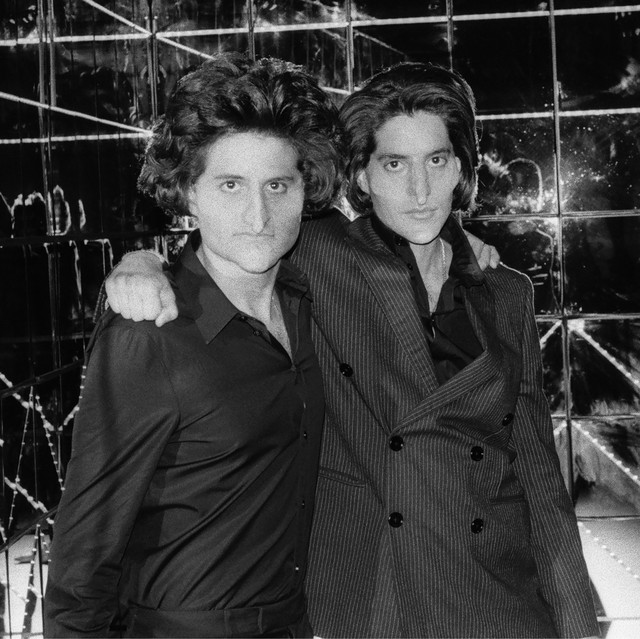
- Loral & Ronnel Raphael

Background information
- Origin: London, United Kingdom
- Genres: Pop; psychedelic
- Years active: 2019–present
- Members: Loral Raphael; Ronnel Raphael

Sons of Raphael is a musical project based in London created by sibling artists Loral and Ronnel Raphael.

== History ==
Sons of Raphael released their debut record, Full-Throated Messianic Homage, in 2021. The record, produced and arranged by the Raphael brothers at Electro-Vox Recording Studios while attending high-school, took 7 years to complete and features a full symphonic orchestra in a grand wall of sound type production which was allegedly financed through betting on NBA games since their record label refused to fund it.

The record was mixed in Paris for over 3 months by producer Philippe Zdar of Cassius, who died a day after finishing mixing the record. The album's artwork was painted by the acclaimed Russian painter and novelist Maxim Kantor. Upon its release, the album gained critical acclaim with praises on publications including The Sunday Times, The Times, Le Monde, Clash, Rolling Stone, and Les Inrockuptibles.

Sons of Raphael rarely play live. They toured with Charlotte Gainsbourg, as well as with French group Phoenix, in 2022. In 2023, Sons of Raphael composed original music for Sofia Coppola's biographical drama Priscilla, their first music for the cinema. In 2025, they released two songs produced by Thomas Bangalter, one former half of Daft Punk. The songs included the main title theme from the series Étoile.

== Discography ==
=== Studio albums ===
- Full-Throated Messianic Homage (2021)

=== Original soundtrack ===
- "Nights Are For Love / At Dawn I Look For You" (Main Title Theme from "Étoile") (2025)
- "Priscilla" (Original Motion Picture Soundtrack) (2023)
